= Mole Valley Farmers =

British farming supplies retailer

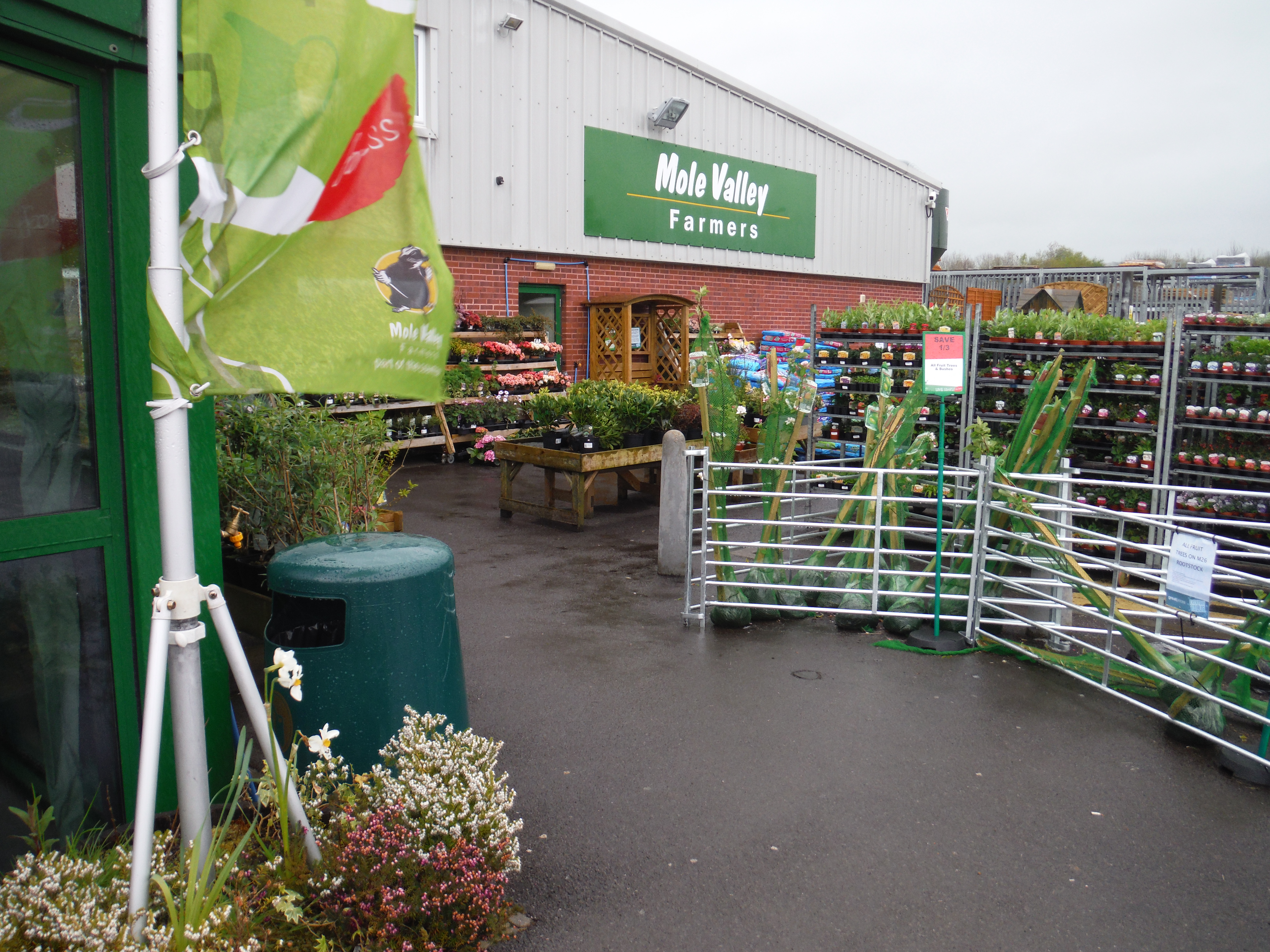
- Branch in South Molton, Devon, UK
- Type: Agricultural cooperative
- Industry: Agriculture / Retail
- Founded: 1960
- Headquarters: South Molton, Devon, South West England, United Kingdom
- Key people: Jack Cordery (CEO) G.M. Cock (Chairman)
- Revenue: £615 Million
- Number of employees: 2100 +
- Website: www.moleonline.com

Mole Valley Farmers is a retail and agricultural supply business with its headquarters in Southwest England. It is run as a cooperative and in 2022-23 the company had a turnover of £610 million. As well as 50 stores, the firm owns feed mills, fertiliser blending plants, a specialist mineral plant, and farm building division.

== History ==
Mole Valley Farmers was founded in 1960 by a small group of farmers in South Molton, Devon, One of the key figures in setting this up was local farmer Philip Victor Miles, He worked tirelessly to set up this cooperation by convincing and bring local farmers together . The aim was to create an agricultural buying-group that would be able to offer agricultural items to farmers at lower prices by buying in bulk. Mole Valley Farmers takes its name from an area in North Devon, between the towns of North Molton and South Molton. The River Mole runs through this area. There is no connection with the Mole Valley, a district in Surrey in South East England or the River Mole that runs between Dorking and Leatherhead.

== Business model ==
The company is operated as a cooperative with members each holding shares in the company. A key part of this is that the company operates on the smallest margin possible to allow continuity and growth. It is not a requirement to be a member of the company to shop there. Today, Mole Valley Farmers is one of the few agricultural cooperatives in the supply industry and one of the largest in the UK.

Mole Valley Farmers owns thirteen branches in South West England, their own feed mills (for animal feeds, at Calne Dorchester, Huntworth and Lifton), fertiliser blending plants, a specialist mineral plant (at Bridgwater), a farm building division (at Witheridge) and a commercial / informational website. The range of goods supplied by Mole Valley Farmers has grown since the company's early beginnings and now includes lifestyle products such as clothing, footwear, garden supplies, pet food, white goods and power tools. However, the firm still has a focus on supplying farmers with direct-to-farm bulk agricultural products. In 2022-23 the company had a turnover of £610m.

The company's closest competitors include ForFarmers, NWF Agriculture, and Wynnstay Group.

== Locations ==
Mole Valley Farmers has 49 branches. These are:

- Alnwick
- Andover
- Basingstoke
- Berkeley
- Billingshurst
- Bridgend - FarmDirect
- Bridgwater - Opened 1980
- Buckingham
- Bury St Edmunds
- Canterbury
- Cirencester
- Colchester
- Cullompton - Opened 1993
- Dereham
- Devizes
- Dorchester
- Driffield
- Fauld
- Frome - Opened: 1990 (current location), 1982 (original location)
- Gillingham
- Heathfield
- Hexham
- Holsworthy - Opened: 1982 (current location), 1973 (original location)
- Leyburn
- Liskeard - Opened 1995
- Lymington
- Market Rasen
- Melton Mowbray
- Newark
- Newbury
- Newport, Isle of Wight
- Newton Abbot - Opened 1987
- Penzance - Opened 2018
- Piercebridge
- Redhill
- Ripley, North Yorkshire
- Romsey
- Salisbury
- South Molton - Opened 1960 (original location)
- St Columb Major - Opened 1986
- Stamford
- Stokesley
- Tavistock - Opened 2018
- Thirsk
- Ulverston
- Wickham
- Winchester
- Worksop
- Yeovil - Opened 1977

== Mergers and acquisitions ==
In 2002, Mole Valley Farmers acquired SCATS Countrystores, which has 19 stores across the south of England. and bought the Buckinghamshire-based rural supplier, Cox & Robinson Farm and Country in 2011.

=== Countrywide acquisition ===
On 27 October 2018 it was announced that Mole Valley had agreed to acquire all retail store locations along with the website and staff from Countrywide. However, this was subject to review by the Competition and Markets Authority and on 6 March 2018 the CMA referred the buy out for an in-depth phase 2 investigation. Countrywide concluded that it would be unable to meet its financial obligations for this extended period of time and so went into administration.
