= South Molton Community College =

Location
- Old Alswear Road; South Molton, Devon, EX36 4LA; England
- Coordinates: 51.01248°N 3.83394°W

Information
- Type: Foundation school
- Motto: Ready, Resilient, Respectful
- Local authority: Devon
- Department for Education URN: 113512 Tables
- Ofsted: Reports
- Principal: Rachel Harper
- Gender: Coeducational
- Age: 11 to 16
- Houses: Eagle, Falcon, Harrier, Kestrel, Osprey
- Colour: Purple
- Website: https://www.smcc.devon.sch.uk/

South Molton Community College (known to students and teachers as SMCC) is a coeducational foundation secondary school located in South Molton in the English county of Devon.

Previously a community school administered solely by Devon County Council, on 2 January 2012 South Molton Community College became a foundation co-operative trust school, partnered with Mole Valley Farmers.

South Molton Community College offers GCSEs, BTECs and OCR Nationals as programmes of study for pupils. As of 2021, it also offers students the opportunity to take initial military training.

Construction of a new school in North Devon was completed in April 2017.

In 2018, a former drama teacher from the school was jailed for voyeurism and possession of indecent images of children after he admitted secretly filming students changing at the school. He was acquitted of other related charges.
