= Guildhall, South Molton =

Municipal building in South Molton, Devon, England

South Molton Guildhall
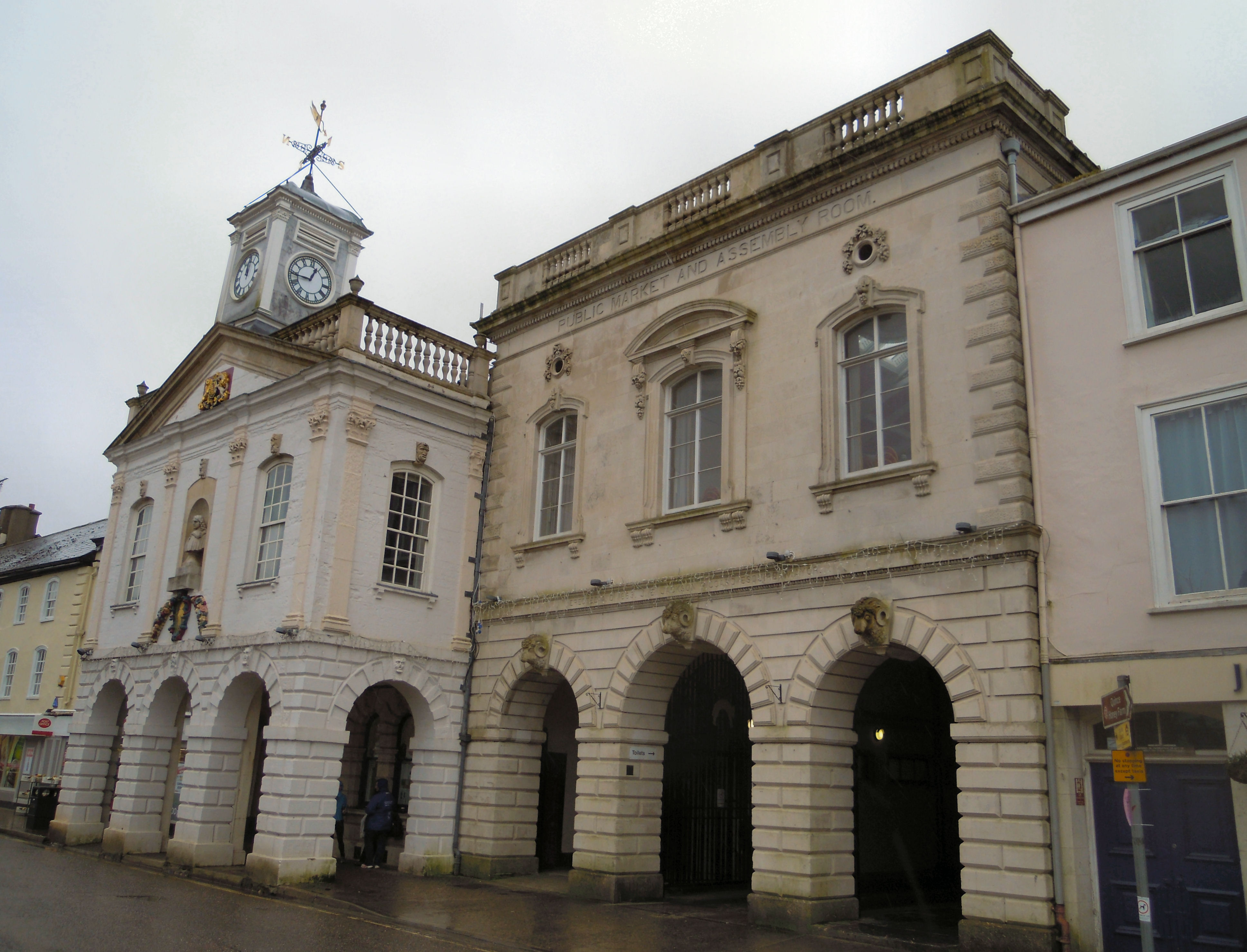
- The Guildhall in South Molton in Devon

- Shown in Devon
- 51°01′03″N 3°50′04″W
- Location: Broad Street, South Molton

History
- Built: 1743

Site notes
- Architectural style: Neoclassical style

Listed Building – Grade I
- Official name: Guild Hall (including borough museum)
- Designated: 20 August 1951
- Reference no.: 1106866

The Guildhall on Broad Street in South Molton in Devon was built between 1739 and 1743 and has been a Grade I listed building on the Register of Historic England since 1951. Today the building is the town hall for South Molton. Beside it, beneath the Old Assembly Room, is the entrance to the Pannier Market for the town.

== History ==
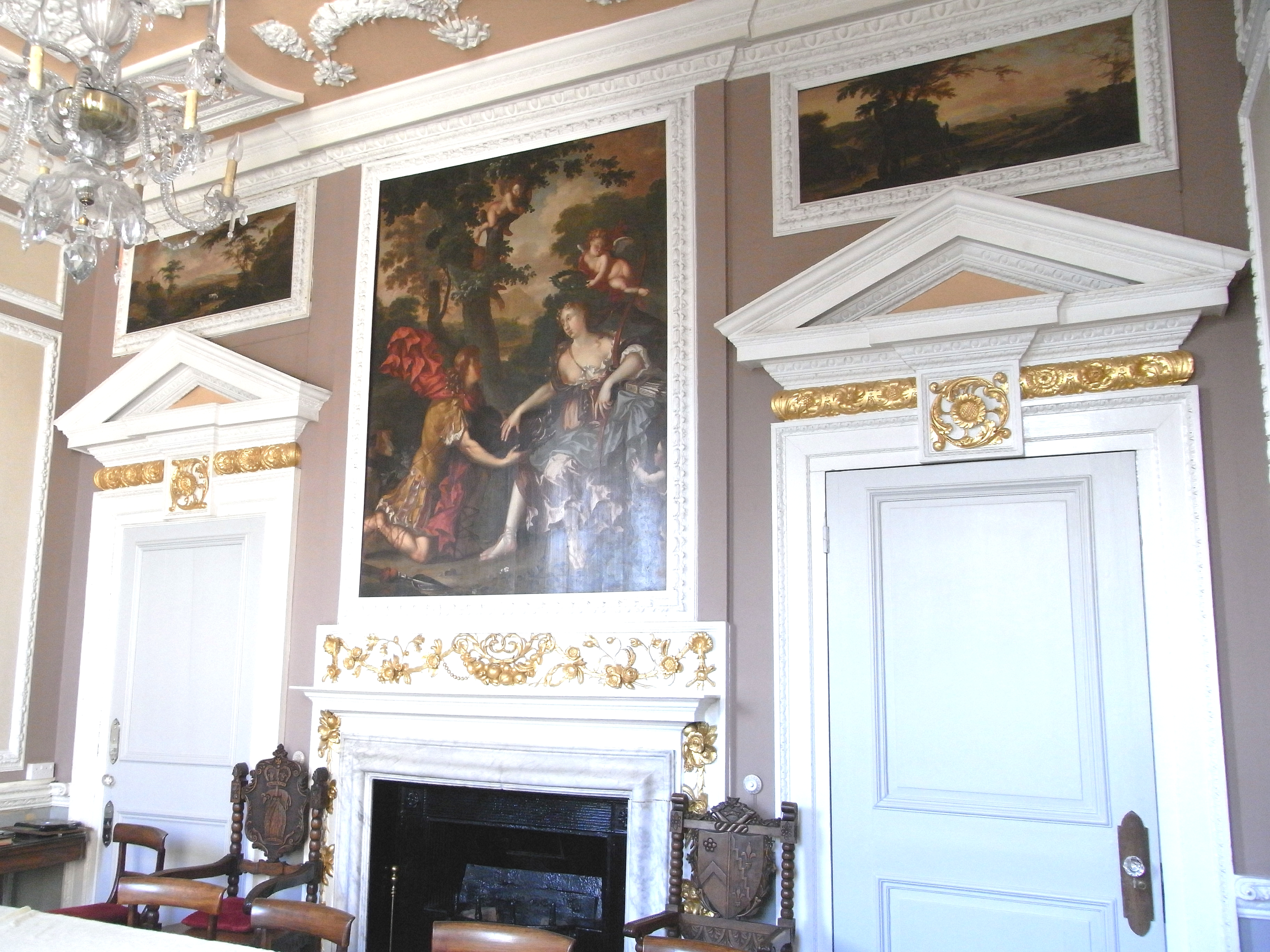
The Mayor's Parlour in the Guildhall. The room was originally in Stowe House and was acquired for incorporation into the South Molton Guildhall designed 1739–43

Completed in two phases - 1743 and 1773 - much of the materials used in the building of the 1743 phase were bought following the demolition of Stowe House in 1739, the former 17th-century mansion in Cornwall. The façade is built of Portland stone with the Court Room supported by three arches extending out over the pavement. The building's two-storeys are stuccoed while the ground floor is rusticated. The upper storey stands over the pavement on three round-headed arches with keystones. The first floor has four pilasters with Corinthian capitals and a pediment displaying the Royal Arms. Atop the building is a wooden cupola with a clock and weather vane erected in 1753. A central niche holds a bust of Hugh Squier (1625-1710) of Petty France, Westminster, a wealthy merchant best remembered as a generous benefactor to the town of South Molton, the place of his birth, where in 1684 he founded a "free school". The bust was placed here in 1910 on the bi-centenary of his death with a floral wreath below it.

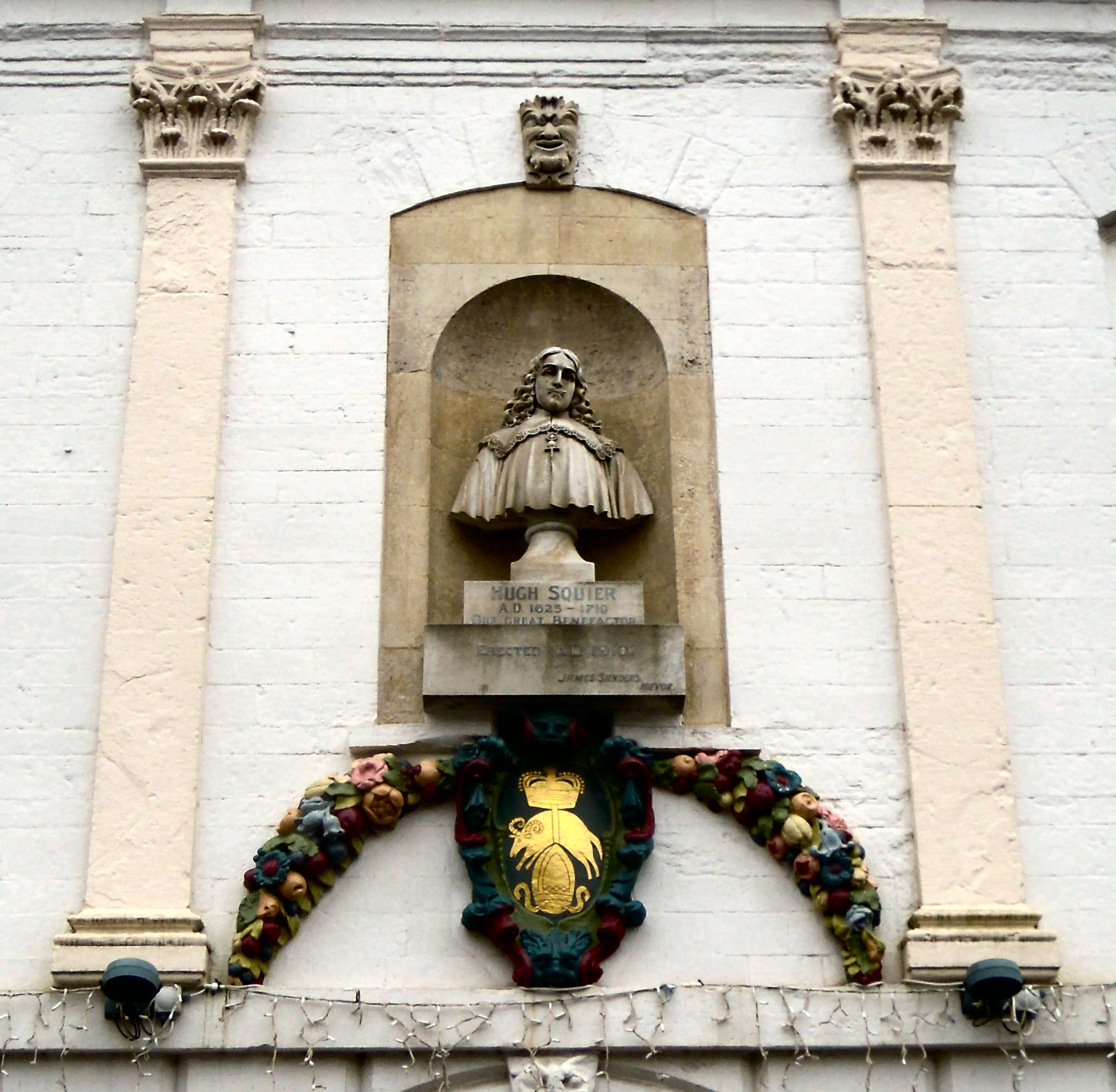
Stone bust of Hugh Squier (1625-1710), within an aedicule on the façade of the Guildhall in South Molton. Inscribed on plinths: "Hugh Squier AD 1625-1710. Our great benefactor. Erected AD 1910, James Sanders, Mayor"

The building of 1743 contains the Court Room with its fine 17th-century panelling and gilded moulding brought here following the demolition of Stowe House in 1739; the Constable's Room, the Mayor's Parlour and a fine early 18th-century staircase with twisted balusters and dado panelling.

The Mayor’s Parlour includes 17th-century materials bought from Stowe House including plasterwork decorative picture frames, a decorated plaster ceiling, four doorcases with gilded pediments, a large overmantel painting in the style of Rubens of "Atalanta presented with the head of the Calydonian Boar by Meleager" and four classical capriccio scenes in small rectangular panels above the doors. The wooden dock in the Court Room was a portable type which could easily be jumped by prisoners.

In 1773 a two-storey wing of stone rubble was constructed at the building's rear to hold a large dining room to provide meals and other services for visiting notables, with the kitchen and other offices below. This wing is now known as the Old Assembly Room and retains its plain 18th-century marble fireplace and paneling. The original early 18th-century jury benches survive while the Kings Arms were made by William Puckridge of London in 1743. Beneath this is the entrance to the town's Pannier Market. The clock was first illuminated in 1903.

== South Molton Museum ==
South Molton Museum is located on the Guildhall's first floor and is managed by South Molton Town Council and volunteers. The Museum displays the social history of South Molton and its development across the centuries. The Museums's collections reflect the life and times of the historic market town and the surrounding district including two Town Charters, granted by Elizabeth I and Charles II, local archaeological finds, agricultural implements, items of domestic interest, textiles, documents, maps, toys, etc. Apart from the permanent exhibition there is also a regularly changing programme of displays. Displayed are the Newsham Fire Engine used in the town from 1736 to 1886 until it was replaced by the Merryweather Fire Engine which was still in use until the early 1930s and which is also displayed.
