= Hugh Squier =

English benefactor

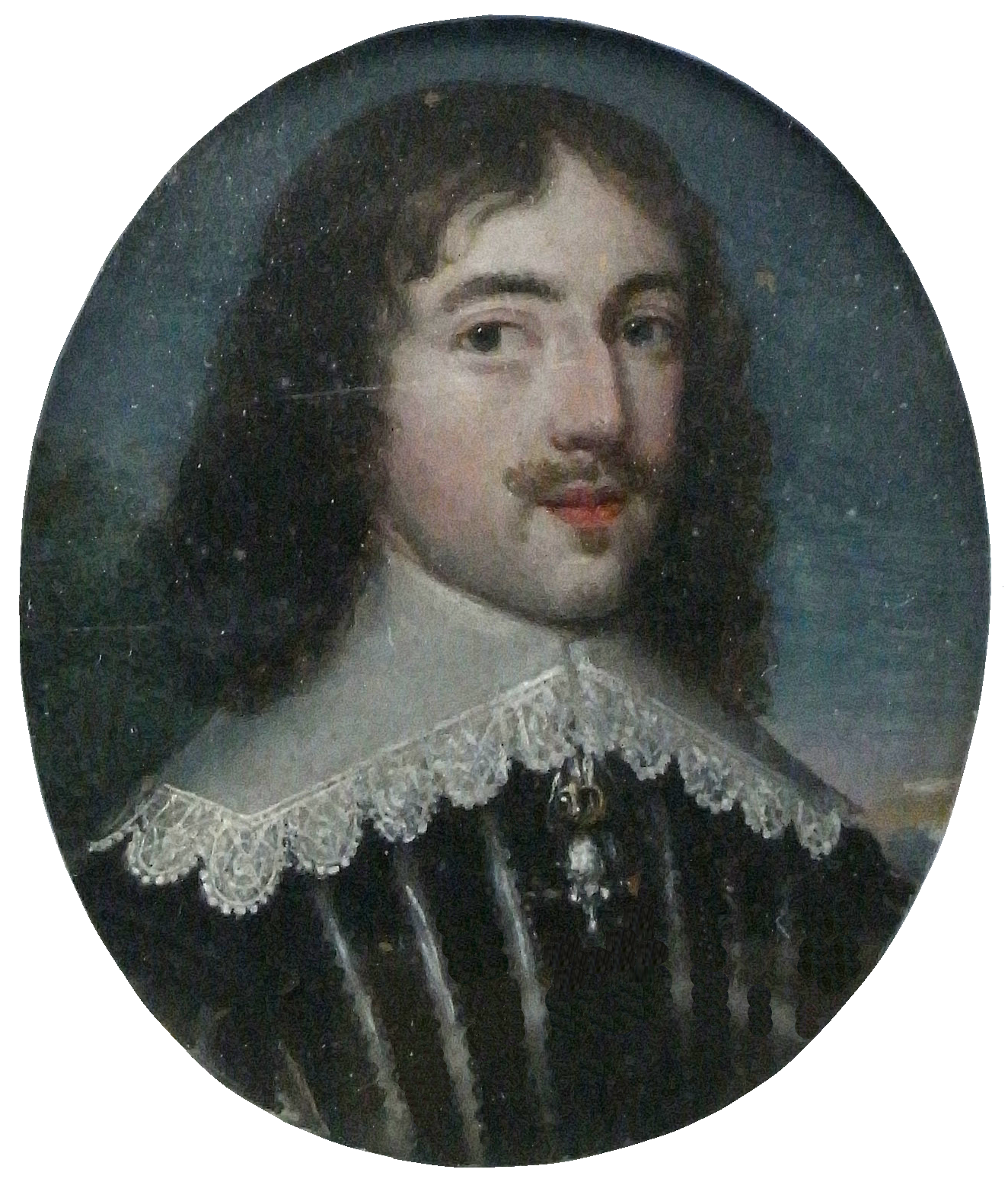
Contemporary miniature portrait of Hugh Squier, by unknown artist. Purchased in 1796 by South Molton Town Council from a certain Mrs May, and today hangs from the chain of office of the Mayor of South Molton

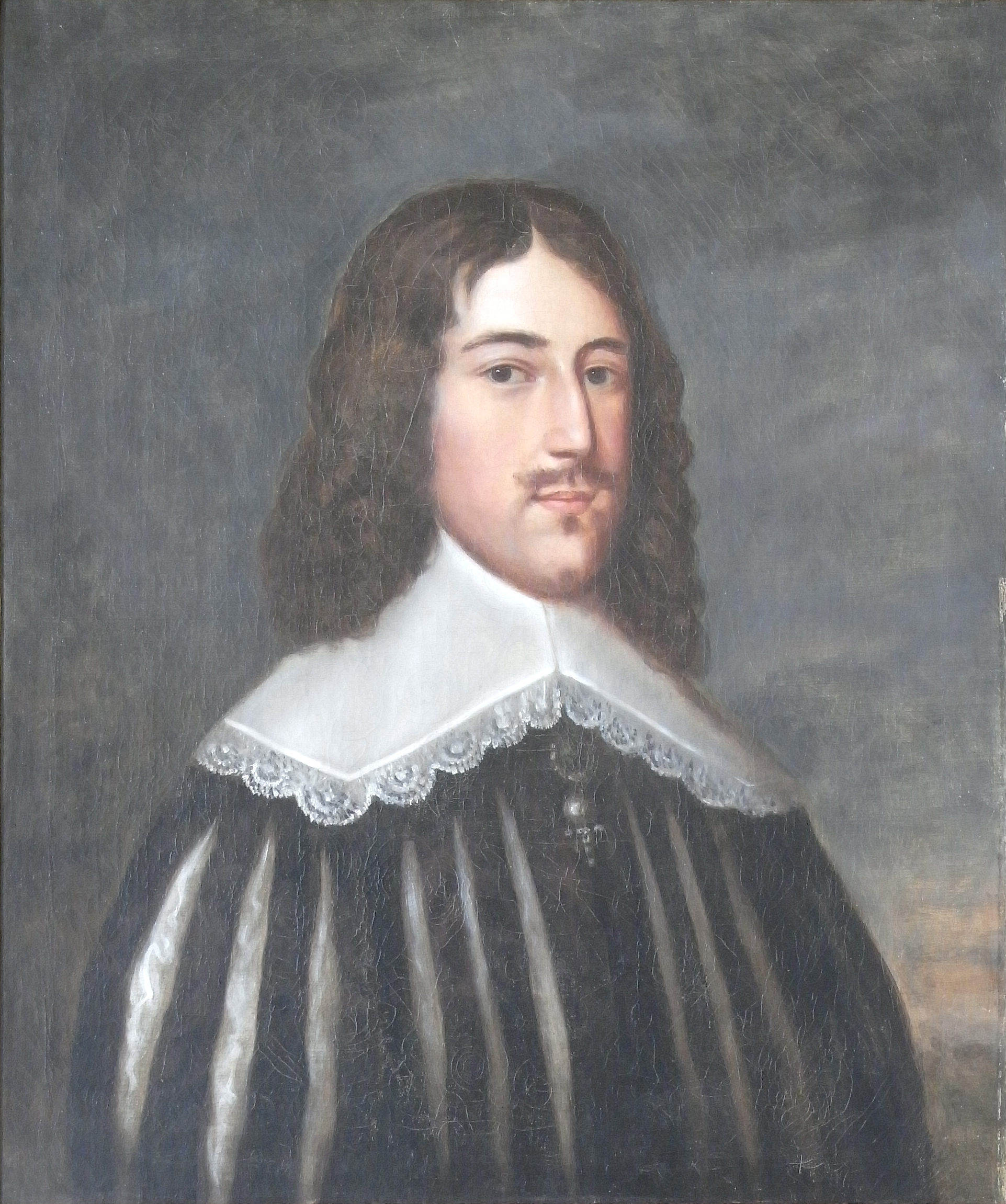
Portrait of Hugh Squier (1625-1710), Mayor's Parlour, Guildhall, South Molton. Painted in 1799 by a certain Mr Whitby, a copy of the miniature purchased by the Town Council in 1796. It hung formerly in Hugh Squier's School.

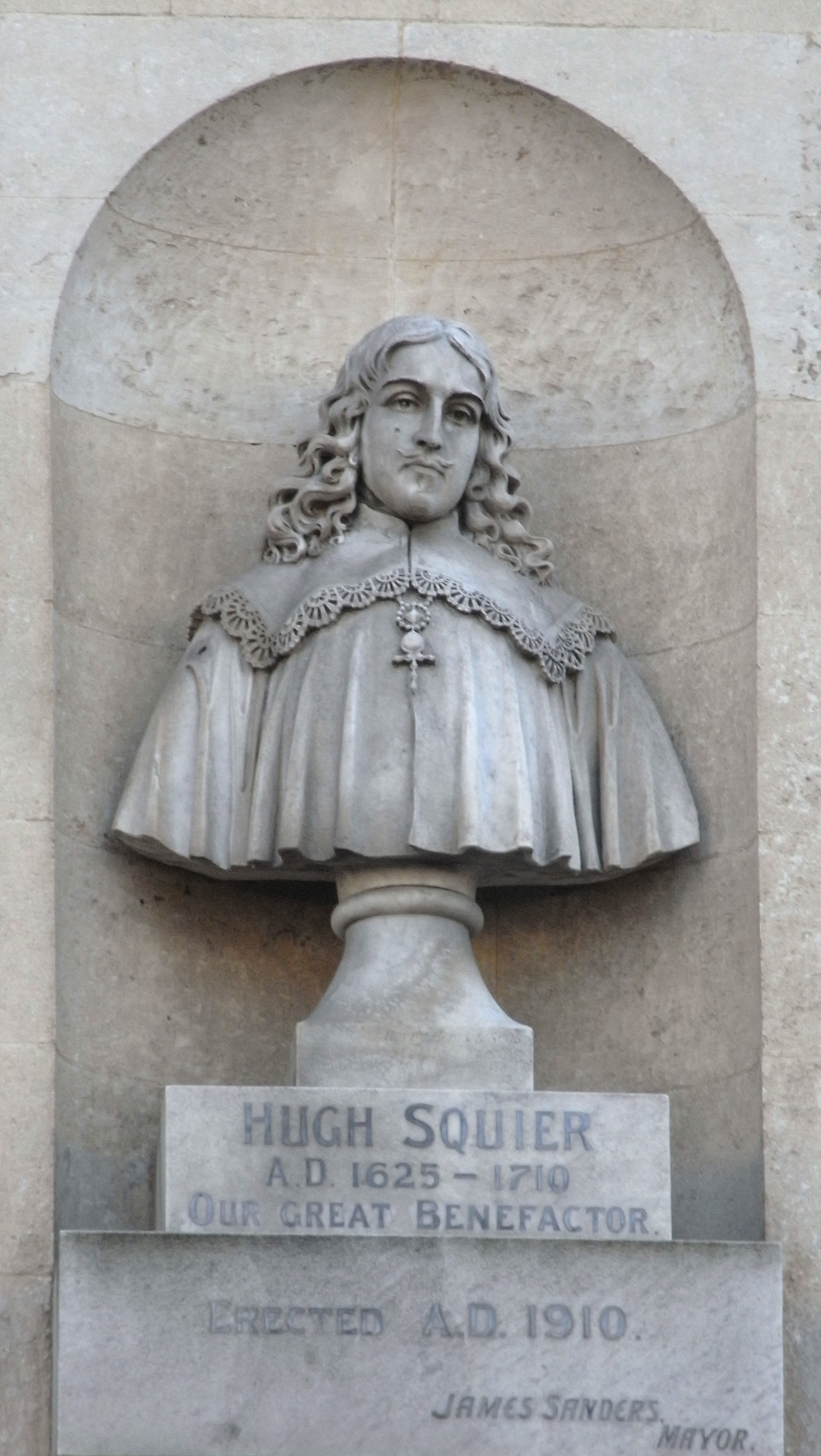
Stone bust of Hugh Squier (1625-1710), within an aedicule on facade of South Molton Guildhall. Inscribed on plinths: "Hugh Squier AD 1625-1710. Our great benefactor. Erected AD 1910, James Sanders, Mayor"

Hugh Squier (1625-1710) of Petty France, Westminster, was a wealthy merchant best remembered as a generous benefactor to the town of South Molton in Devon, the place of his birth, where in 1684 he founded a "free school".

== Origins ==
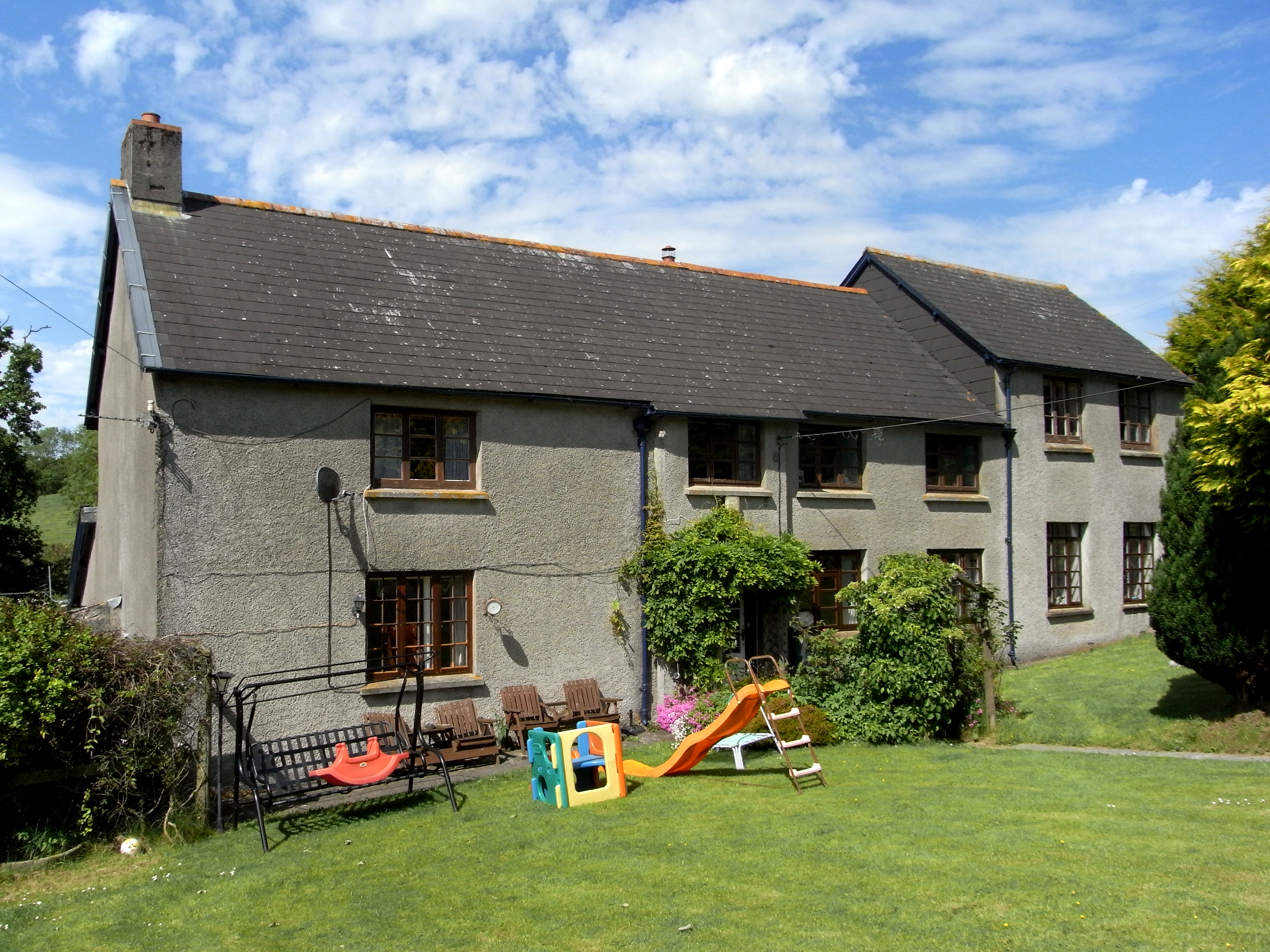
Townhouse Barton, south front, in 2015. The textured concrete rendering and concrete window cills hide a former Devon "mansion" of considerable age containing a fine 17th-century decorative plasterwork ceiling in the ground-floor room of the east annex at right

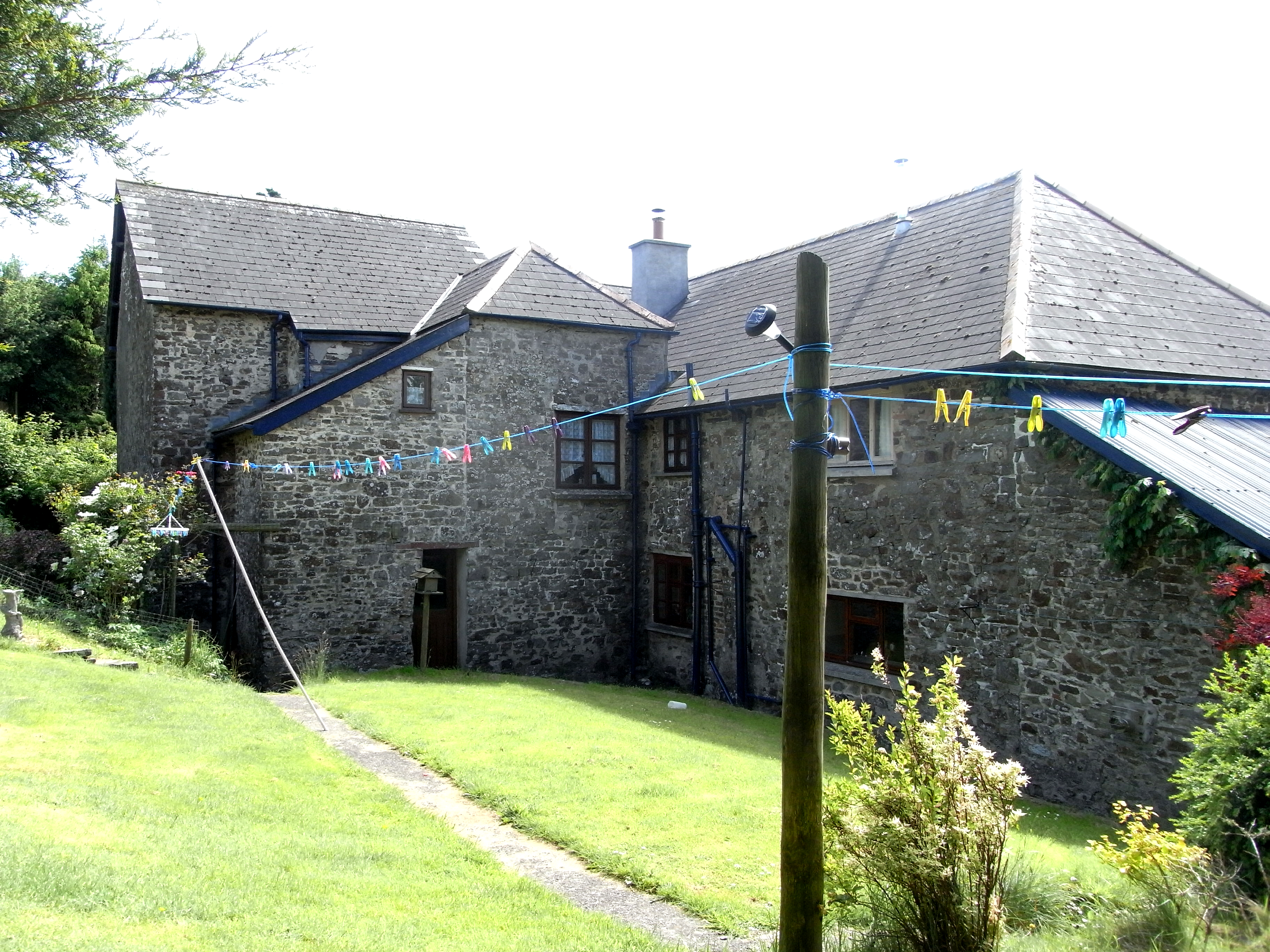
Townhouse Barton, view from north-east, in 2015

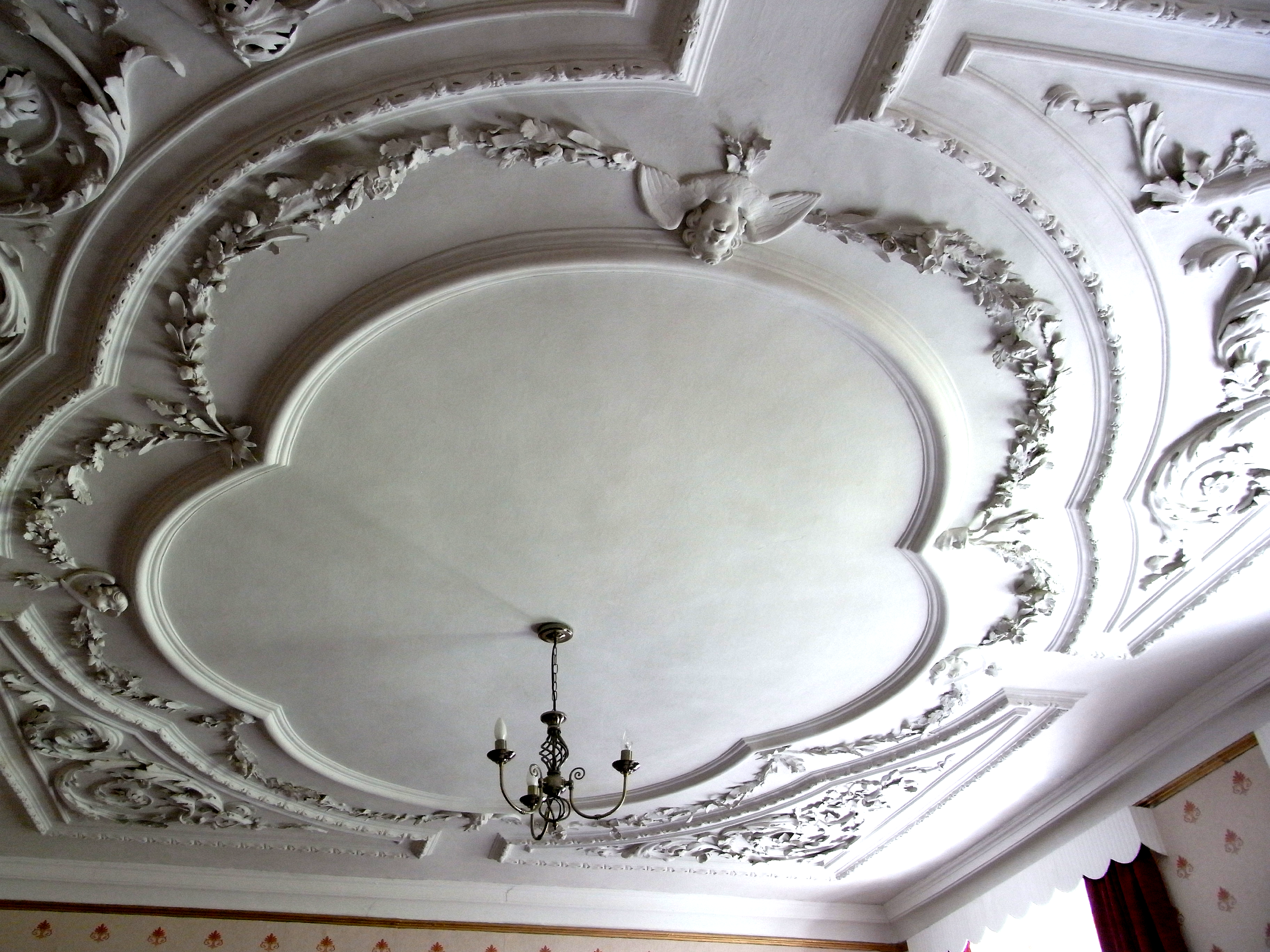
Fine 17th-century decorative plaster ceiling in Townhouse Barton

He was the 4th son of William Squier (c.1581-1653) (son of Christopher Squier (d.1629) of Townhouse), a yeoman, of Townhouse, South Molton, then what Hoskins (1959) calls a "mansion", today a farmhouse situated about 1 3/4 miles west of the centre of the town of South Molton, on the road to Chittlehampton. William Squire was educated at Lyme Regis and at Caius College, Cambridge.

Hugh's mother was Jane Roberts, 3rd daughter and co-heiress of Richard Roberts (d.1622) of Combe Martin, Devon. Richard Roberts, whose mural monument survives in Combe Martin Church, was the owner of the demesne of the manor of Combe Martin and was patron of the churches of nearby Berry Narbor, Devon and of Chew Magna in Somerset. Hugh Squier's uncle-by-marriage was the Devon historian Thomas Westcote (c.1567–c.1637), married to Mary Roberts (d.1666), his mother's elder sister.

=== Brothers and Sisters ===
Hugh had four sisters and three elder brothers as follows:

- Christopher Squier (d.1693) of Townhouse, eldest brother and heir to his father. In 1648 for the sum of £900 he purchased the manor of South Molton from Sir George Whitmore (d. 1654), Master of the Worshipful Company of Haberdashers 1621-2 and Lord Mayor of London in 1631. This entitled him to various customary income due to the lord of the manor from tolls, fairs, markets and other profits. In 1654, the year after his father's death, he granted a 99-year lease of the manor of South Molton jointly to his mother and to his brother Hugh Squier, at an annual rent of £20 7s. The manor formed a large part of Hugh Squier's benefaction to the town. Christopher was one of the founding trustees or governors of Hugh Squier's School, appointed in 1686 by his brother the founder. His son was William Squier (d.1699), later also a governor, father of John Squier (1694-1715), in 1710 appointed a governor in place of his deceased great-uncle, whilst still a schoolboy at Eton College. John was the last in the male line of the Squire family and died aged 21 without progeny. He and his sister Elizabeth Squire (d.1734) were the main beneficiaries of the will of Hugh Squier. Elizabeth died unmarried, having lived all her life at Townhouse and having been a donor to the Blue Coat School in South Molton and other charities in South Molton.
- Richard Squier (d.1669), 2nd elder brother, a soldier who died unmarried.
- William Squier (d.1681), 3rd elder brother, who married a certain Priscilla by whom he had two daughters.

== Career ==
His eldest brother was their father's heir, so Hugh "had the younger son's portion: the privilege of leaving home to make a home for himself". He soon established himself in London as a prosperous merchant, although little if anything is known of his mercantile career. He is known to have had dealings with the East India Company, established in 1600.

=== Founds South Molton School ===
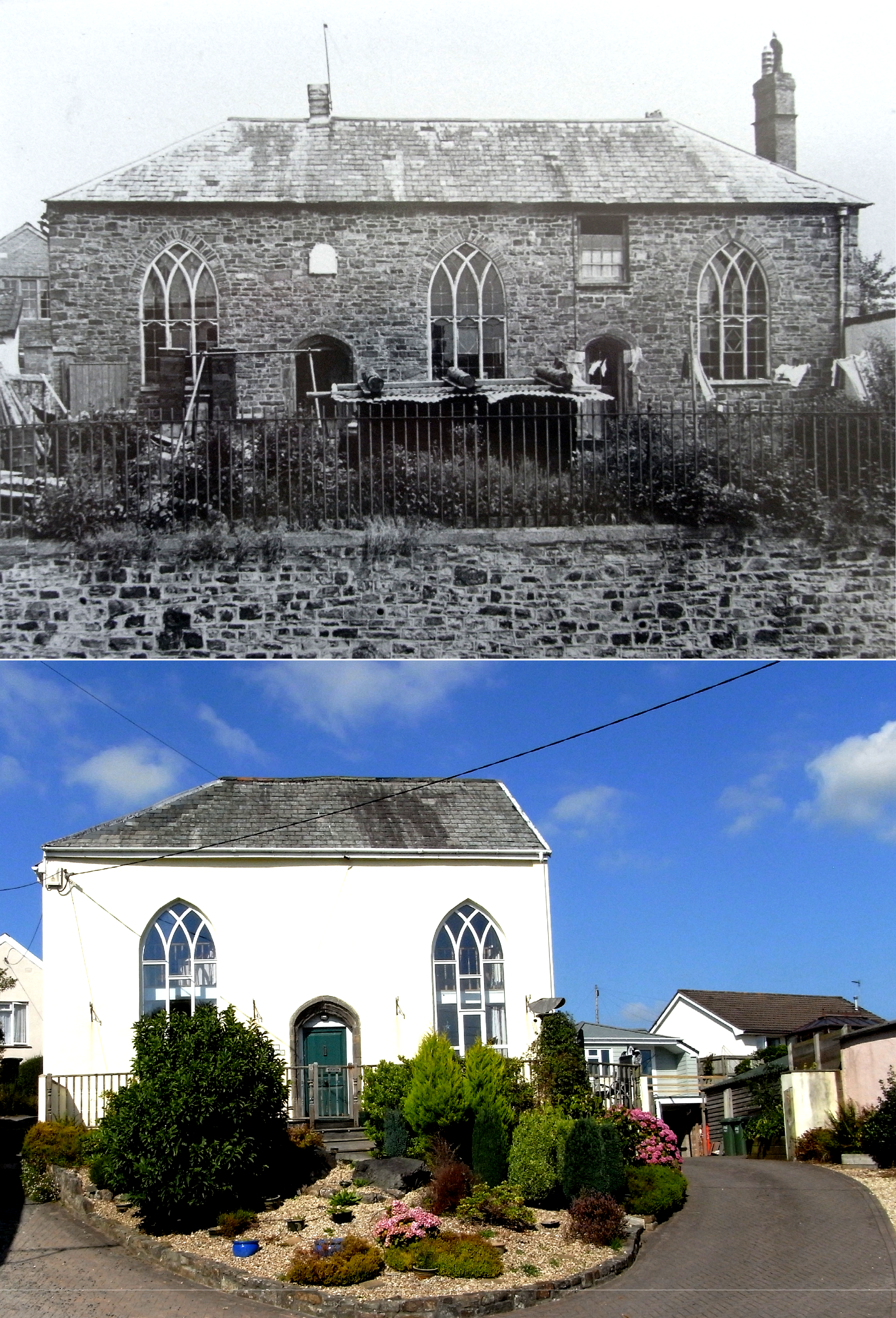
Hugh Squier's School then and now, an old photograph compared with the truncated building in 2015. South front viewed from East Street

His children having all died young and having no heirs he thus decided to devote his wealth to philanthropical causes in his native town. In 1686 he built and endowed a school in East Street, South Molton, known as Hugh Squier's Free School. The original Deed of Endowment and Appointment of Trustees is held at North Devon Record Office in Barnstaple. The school's running expenses were mainly funded by income from Northam estates held on a rolling lease from the Dean and Canons of Windsor. In 1867 the South Molton trustees were notified that the leases would terminate in 1881. The trustees saved £2823 during the period of notice. £2315 was invested in Government stock and £508 was held in the bank. The Charity Commission issued an order dated 12/01/1883 "that the clear amount of the annual income .. after all proper outgoings and expenses shall be expended … on highways maintenance or suitable public works". He also bequeathed income from his estate in the parish of Swimbridge.

The original "Deed of Endowment and Appointment of Trustees" dated 1686 survives in the archives of the North Devon Record Office in Barnstaple, summarised as follows: "Parties:

- 1 Hugh Squier of St Margaret's, Westminster
- 2 Christopher Squier, William Squier of South Molton, John Haach, Anthony Pawle, Humphrey Shobrook, nominated by Hugh Squier as trustees.

Premises: house and building lately known as Free School for writing and arithmetic, and one house for the schoolmaster, which was erected by Hugh Squier where Hunt'sAlmshouses were formerly situated. Capital: £1,000, in money or land, to be settled on trustees for maintenance of buildings, etc. Instructions to Trustees: 20 children of poor people of South Molton to be chosen by the trustees to be educated freely at the school in writing and arithmetic. Children of gentlemen may also attend. Latin may be included. Aim of the school 'to promote the arts of good writing and arithmetick and for the good of the poor, more than the science of grammar or Latin for the good of the rich'. Salaries: writing schoolmaster to be paid £20 p/a plus dwelling house adjoining school; Latin schoolmaster to be paid £20 p/a. Schoolmasters and Trustees to dine together twice yearly. Other instructions to safeguard perpetuity of trust".

==== Masters ====
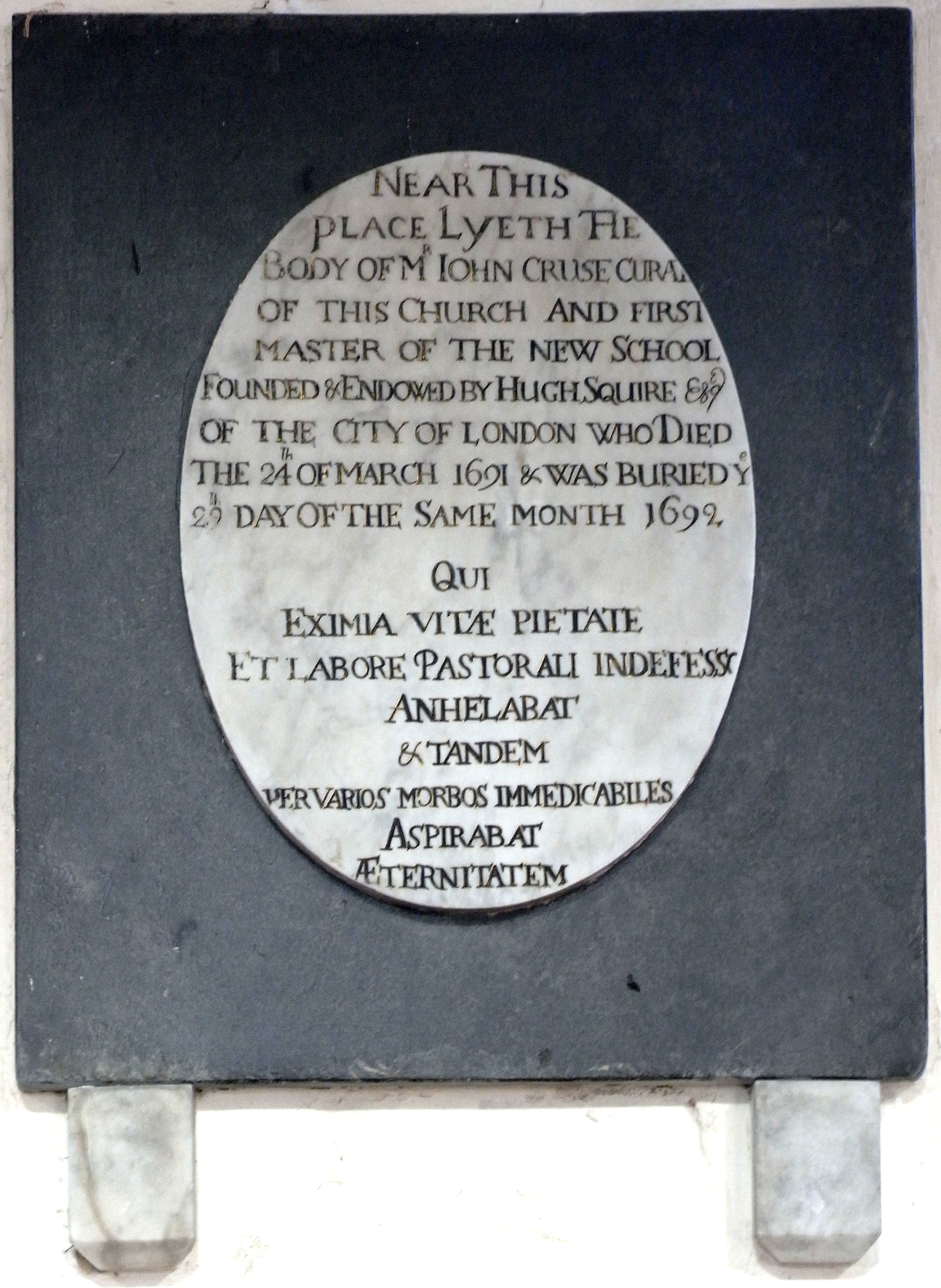
Mural monument in St Mary Magdalen's Church, South Molton, to John Cruse (d.1692), the first Master of the School founded in 1682 by Hugh Squier

===== John Cruse (d.1692) =====
The mural monument of John Cruse (d.1692, N.S.), the first Master of the school survives in St Mary Magdalen's Church, South Molton, inscribed as follows:

Near this place lyeth the body of M(aste)r John Cruse curat(e) of this church and first Master of the new school founded & endowed by Hugh Squire [sic] Esq., of the City of London, who died the 24th of March 1691 and was buried ye 29th day of the same month 1692. Qui eximia vitae pietate et labore pastorali indefesse anhelabat & tandem per varios morbos immedicabiles aspirabat aeternitatem ("Who having been unwearied by distinguished piety and labour of a pastoral life was panting for and at last through various incurable diseases breathed-in, Eternity").

===== Rev. John Coleridge (1719-1781) =====
Rev. John Coleridge (1719-1781) was ordained a deacon in 1749 and in 1750 was ordained a priest and was appointed Master of Hugh Squier's School and Lecturer of Molland. In 1760 he moved to Ottery St Mary, where he served as vicar and Master of the King's School. By his wife Anne Bowden (1726-1809) (probable daughter of John Bowden, Mayor of South Molton in 1726), he was the father of the poet Samuel Taylor Coleridge.

==== Amalgamation ====
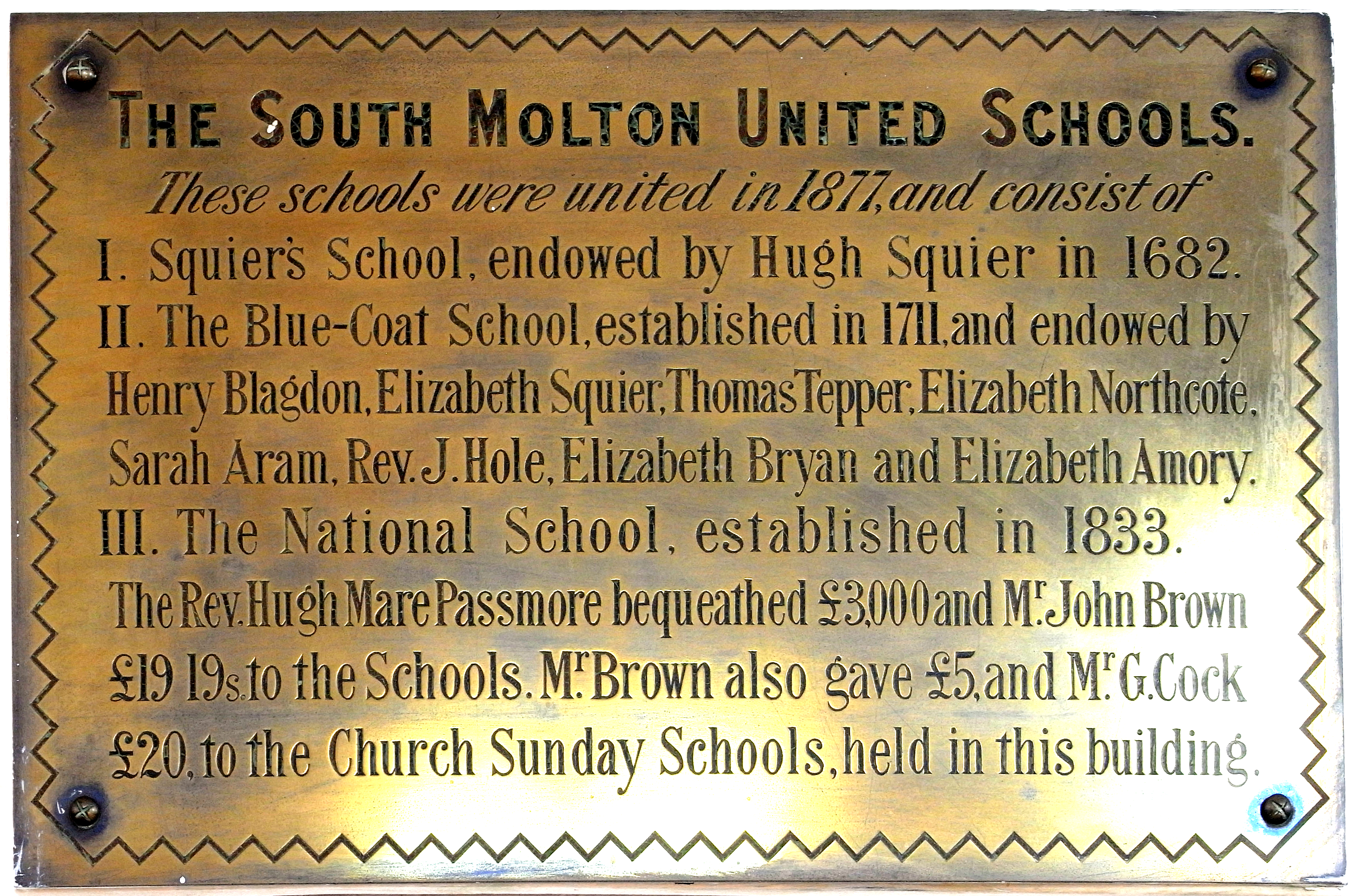
Memorial brass tablet situated above fireplace in school-hall of South Molton Primary School, North Street

In 1877 it was amalgamated with the Blue Coat School, founded in 1711, and with the National School, founded in 1833. The combined school was known as South Molton United Schools. A 19th-century memorial brass tablet situated above the fireplace in the school-hall of South Molton Primary School, North Street, is inscribed as follows:

"The South Molton United Schools. These schools were united in 1877 and consist of:

  - I: Squier's School, endowed by Hugh Squier in 1682;
  - II: the Blue-Coat School, established in 1711 and endowed by Henry Blagdon, Elizabeth Squier, Thomas Tepper, Elizabeth Northcote, Sarah Aram, Rev. J. Hole, Elizabeth Bryan and Elizabeth Amory.
  - III: The National School, established in 1833.

The Rev. Hugh Mare Passmore bequeathed £3,000 and Mr John Brown £19 19s to the schools. Mr Brown also gave £5 and Mr G, Cock £20 to the Church Sunday Schools held in this building".

==== Partial demolition ====
The school building survived intact until the 1960s when purchased by George Wallace for use in his Honey Farm, when he demolished one third of the structure to provide an entrance for articulated lorries. In 1978 the Honey Farm was moved to the old Union Workhouse in North Road and the remaining structure of the school was converted into a private dwelling in which form it remains today.

==== Notable pupils ====
- John Cunningham Saunders (1773–1810), ophthalmic surgeon.

=== Other charitable donations ===
Other charitable donations made by Hugh Squier, mainly in his will, include:

- Donation to the Vicar of Northam, Devon
- Donation to the almshouses in Westminster established by George Whicher (d.1682, new style), who was buried in the east cloister of Westminster Abbey. His marble mural monument survives there inscribed as follows:

"Here lieth the body of Mr George Whicher, Yeoman of His Ma(jes)ties Chappel Royal, who died 4 Feb. An(n)o 1681 & built & endowed an Almshous for 6 poor men in this parish of St Margarets Westm(inste)r."

Whicher was the youngest Yeoman of the Vestry at the Chapel Royal in 1660 but died as the eldest. He seemingly died unmarried. The almshouses he built were demolished in about 1840 and occupied a site on the present Caxton Street. The funds of the almshouses were used to acquire new houses in Lambeth, which still exist. His charity was eventually amalgamated with one established for women by his relative Judith Kifford.

- Donation to the Mayor of South Molton for repairs of the School and of highways, especially the road between the bridge over the River Mole and the school. Several of the footpaths in the streets and through the churchyard were much improved in the year 1894 by the South Molton municipal charity trustees at an outlay of about £500, out of funds in their hands belonging to Hugh Squier's charity.
- Donation to the trustees of his school

=== 1st President of Grey Coat School ===
He was the first President of the Grey Coat School School, in the parish of St Margaret's Church, Westminster, founded in 1698 by 8 local tradesmen and supported by voluntary subscriptions, whose aim was to educate "40 of the Greatest Objects of Charity (orphans and neglected children) in the principles of the Christian religion, teaching to read and instructing them in the Church catechism, the discipline of the Church of England as by law established, and for teaching to write and cast accounts" and (when fit) "binding them apprentices to honest trades and employments". As premises the school was granted rent-free by the Vestry of St Margaret's Church use of the large building of the "Grey Coat Hospital" in Tothill Fields within the parish. the true owner of the freehold of Tothill Fields was disputed between the Vestry of St Margarets, the Vestry of St John's and the Dean and Chapter of Westminster Abbey. In 1696 the Dean and Chapter asserted their claims to the freehold and a committee, consisting of Mr. Justice Railton, Mr. Hugh Squier, Mr. John Parker, Mr. Charles Rampayne, and others were directed to investigate the claim, and to search the ancient deeds and records relating to the title. In 1706 the trustees obtained a royal charter from Queen Anne which formed them into a corporation legally capable of holding land and receiving donations, when the name of the school was changed to "Grey Coat Hospital". "Hugh Squier, Esquire" is listed as one of the many subscribers and benefactors, along with Rev. George Smalridge, DD (who presided at the chapel of ease attended by Hugh Squier). The aims of the school emphasised training in "casting accounts" (which aim together with an emphasis on mercantile arithmetic was also given to Hugh Squier's school in South Molton) and "such of them (pupils) as are capable are also kept to work at spinning, knitting, sewing and other employments to inure them to honest labour and industry".

=== Connection to Blue Coat School, Westminster ===
He was long connected with the Blue Coat School in Westminster, founded in Duck Lane in about 1688 by voluntary subscription as a charity school for the education of poor boys to teach them reading, writing, religion, and trades. In 1709 it moved to a purpose-built premises in Caxton Street, which building survives today. A parchment roll dated about 1700 states:

"In the late reign, when the Roman Catholick Priests and Jesuites were busie in making Proselytes and to that end set up Free Schools in the Savoy and other places in and about the City of London inviting all poor children to be educated by them gratis. Divers well disposed persons inhabitants of ye Parish of St. Margaret West(minste)r, and communicants of the new Church therein, to the honour of God and for preferring and promoting the Religion by law established in the Church of England, did by Charitable and Free Benevolance enact and continue a Free School at their own annuall expense, wherein fifty poor boys of the said Parish, whose Parents were not able to be at the charge of their teaching, were and still are carefully taught to read, write, cast accompts, and also catechised and instructed in the Principles of our most Holy Religion, and put out when fit to trades whereby they might act honest livelyhoods in the World. For defraying of which charges the persons whose names are hereunto subscribed have been and still are Contributors."

Then follows a list of thirty-five names.

=== Intelligence provider ===
The Calendar of State Papers Colonial, America and West Indies, contains the following entry for June 24, 1662:

"Information by Hugh Squier. Heard three men of quality, one a Dutchman, rejoice that the Dutch had done so well, and attribute much of their success to Maurice Thompson and his brother Major (Robert Thomson), who gave them intelligence of the English fleet. Maurice Thompson was always violent against kingly government; he was intimate with the Protector, sat at the High Court of Justice, and sentenced some of the beheaded lords, so is incapable of holding any office; he was once a poor fellow in Virginia, but got a great estate in the wars, mostly rent out of the bowels of the King's party. His brother, Major Rob. Thompson, was also very great with Cromwell".

The information led to a trial for treason of Maurice Thomson, at which he was proven innocent.

=== Loan on the Linen Duty Act 1685 ===
Hugh Squier was marked down as recipient of a repayment of £3,000, one of the highest sums, on the "List of orders of repayment for loans on the credit of the Act of 1 James II, c. 5, granting an imposition on French linens, East India linens, several other manufactures of India, French wrought silks and stuffs, all other wrought silks and all brandies imported after 1685, July 1, and before 1690, July 1, said loans being at 7 per cent."

== Residence ==
He resided at Petty France, on the south side of St James's Park, Westminster, where his local church was "Dr Smalridge's New Church" or "The New Chapel", built in 1631-6 as a chapel of ease to St Margaret's, Westminster, later under the care of Rev. George Smalridge (1662-1719), later Bishop of Bristol (1714-1719). It was demolished (together with the unfashionable classical monuments to Hugh Squire and family within) and rebuilt in 1842 in the fashionable gothic style as "Christ Church, Broadway". but was bombed in 1941 during World War II and later demolished, when the parish was united to St. Peter's Church, Eaton Square. In 1671 his house was described as "near Lord Scudamore's (i.e. John Scudamore, 2nd Viscount Scudamore (c.1650-1697)) in Petty France"

== Landholdings and property ==
Hugh Squire owned landholdings and property including the following:

- Manor of South Molton (lease of). In 1654, at the age of 29 a year after his father's death, he purchased (jointly with his mother) from his eldest brother Christopher Squire a 99-year lease of the manor of South Molton at an annual rent of £20 and 7 shillings.
- 3 houses in the parish of St Martin's Le Grand in the City of London
- 4 Houses in Golden Square, Westminster.
- 1 house in Park Street, Westminster, on the south side of St James's Park. In 1874 together with Queen Square, Park Street was renumbered and renamed Queen Anne's Gate.
- Upcott, an estate in the parish of Chittlehampton, the parish adjoining South Molton parish on the west side. It comprised a 2,000 year lease of a cottage and 52 acres of very poor land, purchased by his father in 1641 for £400.
- Northam, glebe and tithes of the parish, held on a 21 year lease from the Dean and Chapter of Windsor.

=== Tax assessments ===
In the Four Shillings in the Pound Aid 1693/4 the City of London taxed Hugh Squier at £10 (20%) on a rental value of £50 for a property in Parke Street, City of Westminster, let to William Clarke and £12 (20%) on another property in St Margaret's, Westminster, of rental value £60 occupied by himself.

== Will of Hugh Squier ==
Hugh Squier made his will on 24 February 1709, of which a part was as follows:

"And whereas I have, about twenty-eight years ago, erected and built a free school in the town of South Molton, in Devon, for the teaching of thirty poor people's children to write and keep accounts, thereby to fit them for any ordinary trades and employments; and whereas the said school hath prospered hitherto very well under the government of five trustees, who had managed that affair according to divers rules and directions contained in a book of orders left with them by me the founder for that purpose; and my will is that, as often as any two of the five trustees shall die away, &c., and it is expected from those particular men, the five trustees, that they shall take upon them the care of paying out of the revenue of Northam and Upcott and Westminster £29 2s. 9d. to the Church of Windsor every year, and to do it betwixt Michaelmas and Christmas, for rents and tenths, and £15 at the end of every four years for a fine, for the adding of four years de novo unto their lease, or else £30 at the end of every seven years, as their custom of renewing is, together with £3 17s. lOd. for the charges of passing and making every new lease, and adding either four or seven years thereunto, and by this renewing at every four or seven years' end, to make their estate perpetual; and, having observed that the Church of Windsor did take it more kindly when I renewed at four than at seven years' end, therefore I do recommend to the five trustees to renew at every four years; and for their taking this care particularly upon themselves they shall receive a reward of 20s. I say twenty shillings, per annum, unto each trustee, for all the time they are in this employment; and for the defraying of this charge, and for the aforesaid intent and purpose, and also to the further uses that are hereinafter expressed: I do give and bequeathe, unto the mayor and aldermen of the borough of South Molton, in Devon, and to their successors, forever, all my right, title, and estate which I have, or hereafter shall have, in the parish of Northam, in Devon, except the presentation, which is reserved for reasons which hereinafter are expressed, provided and upon condition that they do permit ... Ayres, the present vicar of that parish, and his successors forever, to have, hold, and enjoy the vicarage-house, with the gardens, orchards, and the glebe lands, lands thereunto belonging, or therewith now enjoyed, and also all the oblations, offerings, and surplice fees, and Easter duties that may arise out of the same, and do also pay him, the said Mr. Ayres, and his successors, £16, I say sixteen pounds, per annum, by quarterly payments; and do also pay the above-mentioned sums, which the Church of Windsor doth usually and reasonably require for a fine upon every such renewing of their lease, as their custom of renewing is; and do also pay £5 15s. per annum yearly unto George Whicher his almshouses in Westminster; and also do pay £40 per annum towards the maintenance of South Molton free school, that is to say, £25 to the schoolmaster, £5 to the trustees, £3 for their two usual feasts at their visitation, and £7 for the reparations of the school and schoolhouse, and the highways between the schoolhouse and Mole Bridge — in all £40 per annum; and the overplus which the said Upcott and Northam do produce, beyond and more than all these disbursements do amount unto, (which I do find and compute to be about £60 per annum) shall go, the one half thereof always unto him who is and shall be mayor of South Molton for the time being, towards the expenses of mayoralty, and the other half towards the mending of the highways in and near the town of South Molton, in Devon."

The testator then gave three leasehold houses in St Martin's-le-Grand to the parish of St. Margaret's, Westminster, the rents of which were to be appropriated to various purposes; and then proceeded:

"And because that several sums, whilst they stand written in words at length, and until they are set down in figures, (the one sum under the other) cannot well be cast up, therefore, I have drawn up several accounts — the one of all I have now given unto the corporation of South Molton, in Devon, and to the free school which I built there about 28 years ago; and the other of all I have given unto the parish of St Margaret's, Westminster. Both of these accounts I do make to be part of this my will; and my will and meaning is, that all what I have given unto the corporation of South Molton, and to the free school which I built there, shall be delivered over unto them by my executors from the time of my death; but what I have given to the parish of St Margaret's, Westminster, my executors shall continue to keep, and the profits of it, in their own hands, and to their own use, for one year after my decease."

== Monuments ==
- Miniature portrait. A miniature portrait of him formerly the property of a certain Mrs May was purchased in 1796 by South Molton Town Council and today hangs from the chain of office of the Mayor of South Molton.
- Portrait. An oil on canvas portrait of him exists in the Mayor's Parlour in South Molton Town Hall, possibly the portrait made in 1799 by a certain Mr Whitby, "probably taken from an existing miniature", and which hung formerly in the school.
- Stone Bust, Guildhall. A stone bust of him was made in 1910, on the bicentenary of his death, apparently copied from the painting, and was mounted on a plinth on the facade of the South Molton Guildhall, where it survives today. It bears the following inscription: "Hugh Squier AD 1625-1710. Our great benefactor. Erected AD 1910, James Sanders, Mayor". It was possibly erected as a result of the admonition written by the Historian of South Molton J. Cock in his 1893 work Records of ye Antient Borough of South Molton in ye County of Devon, lamenting the 1842 destruction of the Squire family monuments in "The New Chapel", Westminster:

"And to think that all this could happen within the last century - that none of those in Westminster who were (and are still) recipients of Hugh Squier's bounty could speak a word for his monument - for certain it is that if such a business had been made public (even in the Dark Ages of 1842) it could not have been carried into effect. Shame to those Westminster men, but greater shame will it be to South Molton men (now the truth is made known to them) if they do not at once agree upon some worthy memorial to him of whom every man, woman and child in this town is a pensioner".

The Western Times newspaper reported on 6 March 1900 on the holding of a meeting "to consider a scheme to perpetuate the memory of Hugh Squier", attended by persons including: ...Blackford, J. Cant, J. C Huxstable, W. C Burgess. W. Moor. R. Cock, ...Richards, F Jutsnm(?), J. Nott, J. Vernon. S. Widgery, J. Eldridge, W.T. Smith and W. Otaampion(?).

- Bust in Primary School. Another bust of Hugh Squier exists in the hall of the Victorian Primary School building in South Molton.
- Hugh Squier Avenue. In 1946 a street in a new council estate on the east side of South Molton was named "Hugh Squier Avenue".
- "Hugh Squier Ward", the name of the only in-patient ward in South Molton Community Hospital.

== Sources ==
- Edmunds, Jonathan, The Book of South Molton, 2002, pp. 45–6
- Joyce, Rev. Walter W., Hugh Squier's School, South Molton, published in Vol. 40, Transactions of the Devonshire Association for the Advancement of Science, Literature and Art, 1928, pp. 225–232
- Cock, J., Records of ye Antient Borough of South Molton in ye County of Devon, 1893, Chapter VII: Mr Hugh Squier and his Family, pp. 173–194
- Morey, Gertrude, Hugh Squier of South Molton, 1625-1710; A Note of his Founding of the Free School in South Molton, his Will and his Benefactions to the Town, published in Devon Historian, Vol. 23, 1981, pp. 7–11
- General Index to the First Fourteen Reports of the Commissioners Appointed to Inquire Concerning Charities in England and Wales, House of Commons, 1827 , vol xi, pp. 115, 122, 126,
