= Mayor of South Molton =

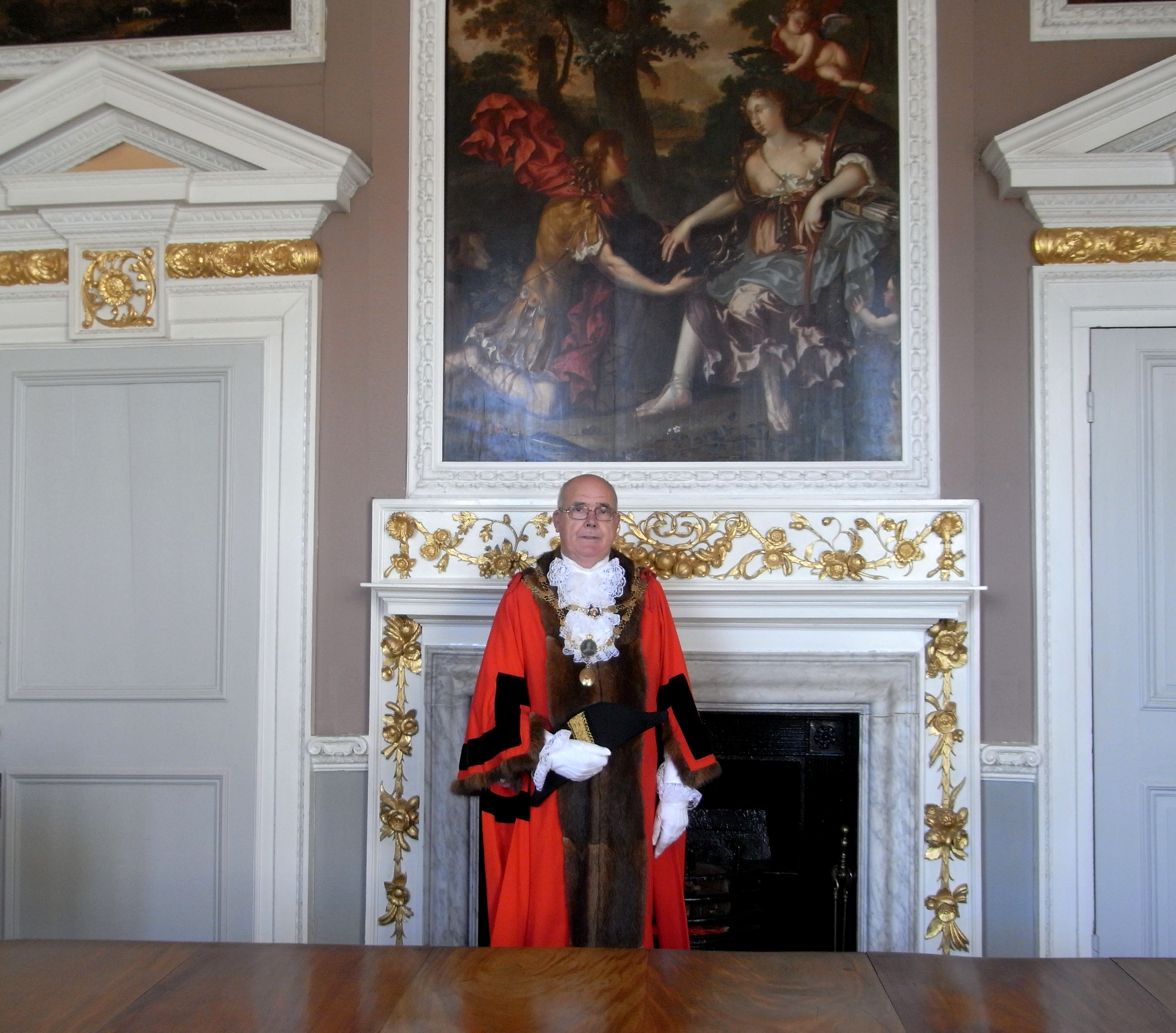
Councillor David Goodman, Mayor of South Molton in 2015–16, in the Mayor's Parlour

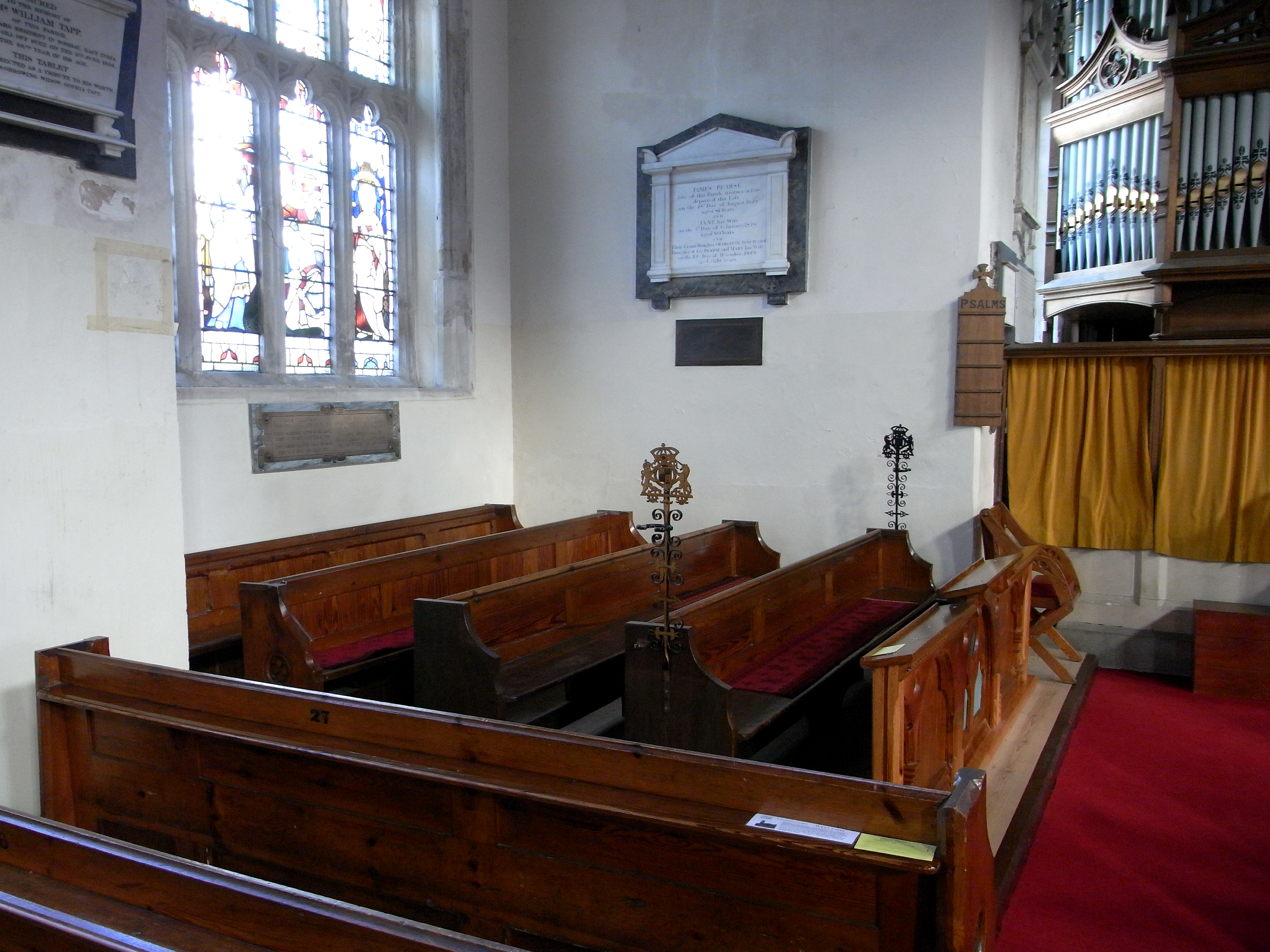
Mayoral Pew, St Mary Magdalene Church, South Molton

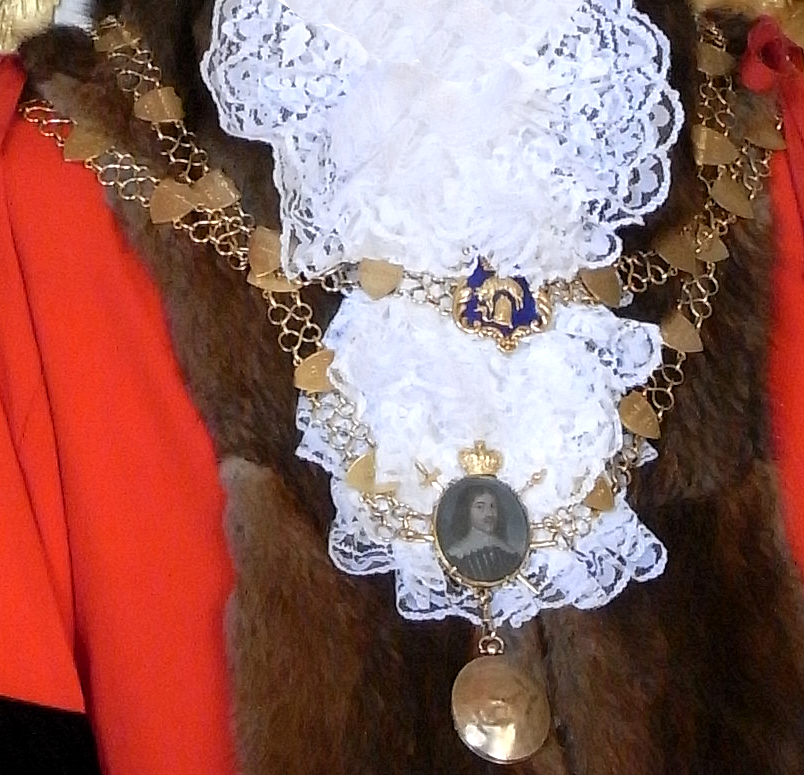
Mayor's Chain of Office, Mayor of South Molton, made in 1893, from which hangs a miniature portrait of Hugh Squier (died 1710), the town's "great benefactor". Above is an enamelled coat of arms of the Borough of South Molton: Azure, a bishop's mitre in chief a sheep's fleece or

The Mayor of South Molton in Devon is an ancient historical office which survives at the present time. In the Middle Ages the town of South Molton was incorporated by royal charter into a borough governed by a mayor and Corporation. This enabled the inhabitants to free themselves from the jurisdiction of the lord of the manor of South Molton and to subject themselves instead to the jurisdiction of the king.

== Present function ==
The Mayor is elected for a one-year term annually in May by the South Molton Town Council. It is a non-political office. The Mayor acts as Chairman of the Town Council, of which he is the figurehead, and enforces the smooth running of Council business. He appoints his own ceremonial officers, namely two Serjeants at Mace, Mayor's Constables, Chaplain and Mayor's Cadet. During his year of office he attends various events and functions, within South Molton and outside the borough and parish, when he acts as the formalm representative of the Borough of South Molton. Typical mayoral duties include opening a local fete, judging floats at the South Molton Carnival, attending ceremonial church services, and visiting a parishioner on their 100th birthday.

== Historic function ==
The Mayor formerly presided over a Bench of Magistrates at the South Molton Petty Sessions, now abolished.

== Mayor's Parlour ==
The Mayor has exclusive and unrestricted use of the Mayor's Parlour within the Town Hall, a grand room designed for business and personal entertaining, built and decorated with fittings formerly within Stowe House, Kilkhampton, Cornwall, the mansion built by John Grenville, 1st Earl of Bath (1628–1701) and demolished in 1739.

== Mayoral Pew ==
The north transept of St Mary Magdalene Church, South Molton, contains the "Mayoral Pew", comprising four rows of pews for the use of the Mayor and Town Council. The pew is used on ceremonial occasions, for example at the annual Harvest Festival service in September.

== Regalia ==
The ceremonial dress of the Mayor includes a crimson fur lined robe, a cocked hat, white gloves, and the Mayor's Chain of Office, made in 1893, from which hangs a miniature portrait of Hugh Squier (died 1710), the town's "great benefactor". Kelly's Directory of Devon reported in 1902:

The municipal insignia include two maces, a mayor's chain and badge, a staff of office and a common seal. The maces, of silver gilt, and 2 feet 4 inches long, form a pair, and are similar in every respect; the shafts are divided into two parts by an ornamental knob, and the bases are enriched with leaf-work, the beads are ornamented with the national emblems and crowns and mitres, boldly executed, and have a cresting of crosses and fleurs-de-lis, from which rise arched crowns, with the usual orb and cross; the mayor's chain consists of plain geld links; the badge is a gold medallion, bearing a portrait of Hugh Squier, merchant, of London, a great benefactor to the town; the staff of office, 6 feet 8 inches long, is of wood, and has a mitre-shaped silver head with the representation of a fleece surmounted by a royal crown; the borough seal, of silver, also exhibits a fleece, with a crown in chief and a mitre in base; around is a legend and the date 1716; the mayor wears a robe of scarlet and fur.

== Mayor's Charity ==
Each Mayor holds a Dinner Dance or similar event in the Town Hall for the purpose of raising funds for his chosen charity. Funds so raised are normally distributed at the end of the Mayoral term of office.

== List of mayors ==
- 1726: John Bowden, probable father of Anne Bowden (1726–1809), mother of the poet Samuel Taylor Coleridge, and wife of Rev. John Coleridge (1719–1781), Master of Hugh Squier's School and Lecturer of Molland.
- 1751: George Gay
- 1811: Joshua Bryan
- 1852: J.E.J. Riccard, Esq.
- 1875: Robert Tanner, wine and spirit merchant. He hit the headlines in September 1875 when his wife Hannah (née Snell) eloped to Paris with the local Plymouth Brethren preacher, a Dutchman named Vanderquast, and four of her children. Tanner left South Molton in 1876 and died in Brooklyn, New York, on 30 December 1889.
- 1887-8: John Galliford, who presided at the ceremonial opening of the South Molton Post Office, converted from the Market House. Commemorated by an inscribed tablet on the building.
- 1889: Albert Edward Shapland. He was "the fourth son of the late Mr John Terrill Shapland, solicitor, Southmolton, and on his father's death in 1879 he succeeded to his practice, which he carries on under the style of J. T. Shapland and Son. A native of South Molton, he was first elected to the Council five years ago, and three years after was again returned. Mr Shapland, who married in 1880, the younger daughter of Alderman Galliford, is a Conservative, the hon. Secretary and Treasurer of the Football Club, and a vice-president of the Cricket Club. His election will be a popular one". (Trewman's Exeter Flying Post, Tuesday, September 17, 1889)
- 1901-03: Frederick Day (Liberal Unionist) (two terms)
- 1904: John Abraham Kingdon. Photographic portrait in collection of South Molton Museum.
- 1910: James Sanders. He erected a stone bust of Hugh Squier (died 1710), on the bicentenary of his death, on the facade of the South Molton Town Hall, where it survives today, inscribed on the plinth as follows: "Hugh Squier AD 1625–1710. Our great benefactor. Erected AD 1910, James Sanders, Mayor".
- 1931: J.A. Powell. Photographic portrait in collection of South Molton Museum.
- 1978/9: Dr. Richard Linley Norris. Photographic portrait in collection of South Molton Museum.
- 2007/9: Stephen Lock (born 1950)
- 2013/14: Stephen White
- 2014/15: Stephen Lock (born 1950). A heating and plumbing engineer, a town councillor for 13 years, previously mayor from 2007–9. His wife Christine also served as a town councillor. At the start of his term of office he declared that "debate was not possible due to an unacceptable level of infighting at town council meetings", and rebuked councillors.
- 2015/16: David Goodman
- 2016/17: Stephen Lock
- 2017/18: Christine E Lock
- 2018/19: Christine E Lock
- 2019/20: Paul Henderson

== Sources ==
- "South Molton Town Council". southmoltontowncouncil.co.uk.
