= River Mole, Devon =

River in Devon, England

River Mole
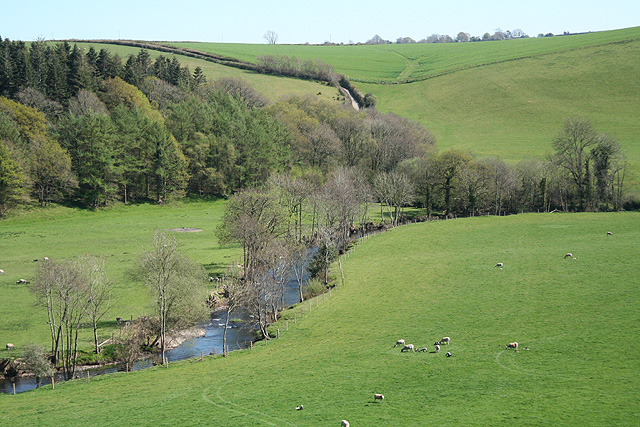
- The River Mole below its confluence with the River Yeo.

- Location within Devon

Location
- Country: England
- Counties: Devon
- District: North Devon
- Towns: North Molton, South Molton

Physical characteristics
- Source: North Molton Ridge
  - location: Twitchen, North Devon, Devon
  - coordinates: 51°5′6.5″N 3°44′25″W
  - elevation: 360 m (1,180 ft)
- Mouth: River Taw
  - location: Junction Pool, Devon
  - coordinates: 50°56′30″N 03°54′24″W
  - elevation: 6 m (20 ft)
- Discharge
  - location: Woodleigh
  - average: 8.70 m^{3}/s (307 cu ft/s)
  - minimum: 0.20 m^{3}/s (7.1 cu ft/s)27 August 1976
  - maximum: 188.0 m^{3}/s (6,640 cu ft/s)9 January 1968

The River Mole a tributary of the River Taw in Devon, England. It rises on the southwestern border of Exmoor. The river takes its name from the market towns of North and South Molton. The river used to be known as the Nymet.

== Tributaries ==
- River Yeo
- Crooked Oak
- River Bray
- Little Silver Stream

== See also ==
- List of rivers of England
