= South Molton =

Town in Devon, England

Coordinates: 51.02°N 3.83°W

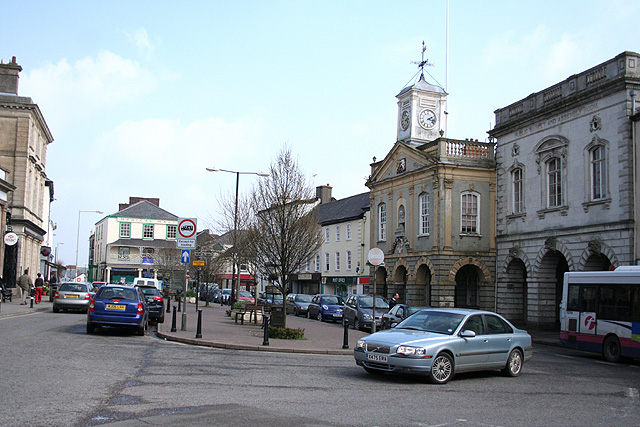
- The Square, looking towards SE showing the projecting north front of the Palladian Guildhall built 1739-41

- Location within Devon
- Population: 6,354 (Parish, 2021); 6,225 (Built up area, 2021)
- Civil parish: South Molton
- District: North Devon
- Shire county: Devon
- Region: South West
- Country: England
- Sovereign state: United Kingdom
- Post town: South Molton
- Postcode district: EX36
- Dialling code: 01769
- Police: Devon and Cornwall
- Fire: Devon and Somerset
- Ambulance: South Western
- UK Parliament: North Devon

South Molton is a town and civil parish in the North Devon district, in the county of Devon, England. The town is on the River Mole. In 2021 it had a population of 6225.

South Molton is a market town trading mostly in sheep and cattle. There was a railway station on the Devon and Somerset Railway until 1966, when the branch line was closed. It is situated on the southern side of Exmoor just off the A361 North Devon link road, which in part follows the route of the railway line.

== History ==
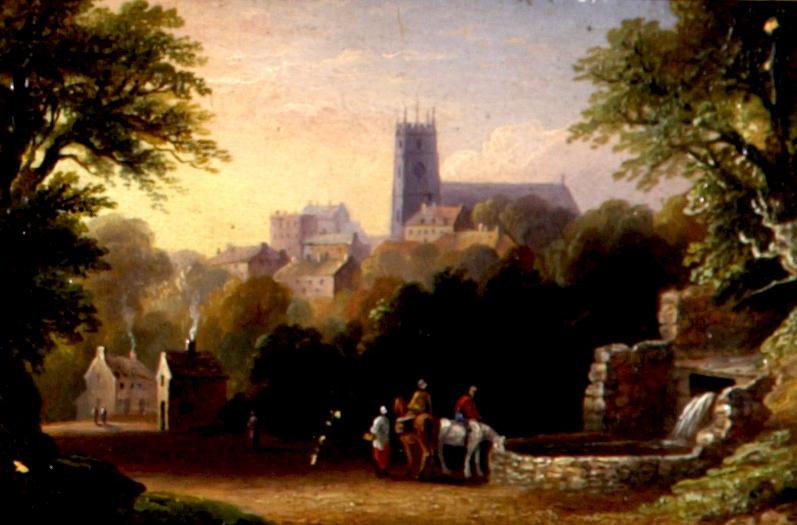
Painting of South Molton c. 1865 - c. 1867, by Devon artist John Wallace Tucker (1808–1869), depicting St Mary Magdalene Church

The Hundred of South Molton was a pre-Norman administrative centre overseeing the estates of: South Molton, Bishops Tawton, Bray, Bremeridge, Aller, Molland, Anstey, Swimbridge, Ringcombe, Newton, Whitstone, Knowstone, George Nympton, Honiton, North Aller, Hacche, Radworthy, Pulham, Satterleigh, Chittlehampton, Wadham and Swimbridge.

"In South Molton hundred there are 22 hides." (roughly 2640 acres)

References to South Molton as an estate in the 1086 Domesday Book (Exon),

"The king has 1 estate which is called South Molton, which King Eadweard held on the day that he himself was alive and dead. In that estate is 1 virgate and a half of land. 40 ploughs can plough this. There the king has 1 plough and the villans have 20 ploughs. There the king [has] 12 villans and 4 bordars and 2 slaves and 12 swineherds and 9 beasts and woodland 1 league in length and 3 furlongs in width, and 10 acres of meadow and 30 acres of grazing-land; and it pays 10 pounds a year by weight."

To this estate has been added half a virgate of land, called Ringedona; and it is worth 5 shillings a year."

"In South Molton, the king’s estate, 4 clerks (priests) have 1 virgate of land, which they hold in alms from the king; and it is worth twenty shillings a year." Domesday Book

"In the hundred of South Molton there is 1 ferding of land which 1 plough can plough and it is lying completely ruined. None of the men claims this." Domesday Book

On 14 March 1655, Sir John Penruddock was captured after a three-hour street fight in South Molton by soldiers of the New Model Army under the command of Captain Unton Croke. This ended the Penruddock uprising, a conspiracy to restore Charles II to the throne of England.

In 1770 William Turner moved from South Molton to London to trade as a barber and wig maker. Around 1775 he had a son Joseph Mallord William Turner who lived in covent Garden until he was ten years old when he was sent to live with uncles in Brentford. J M W Turner later went on to become one of Englands most famous painters.

The population at the time of the 1841 census was 3,597 inhabitants.

== Governance ==
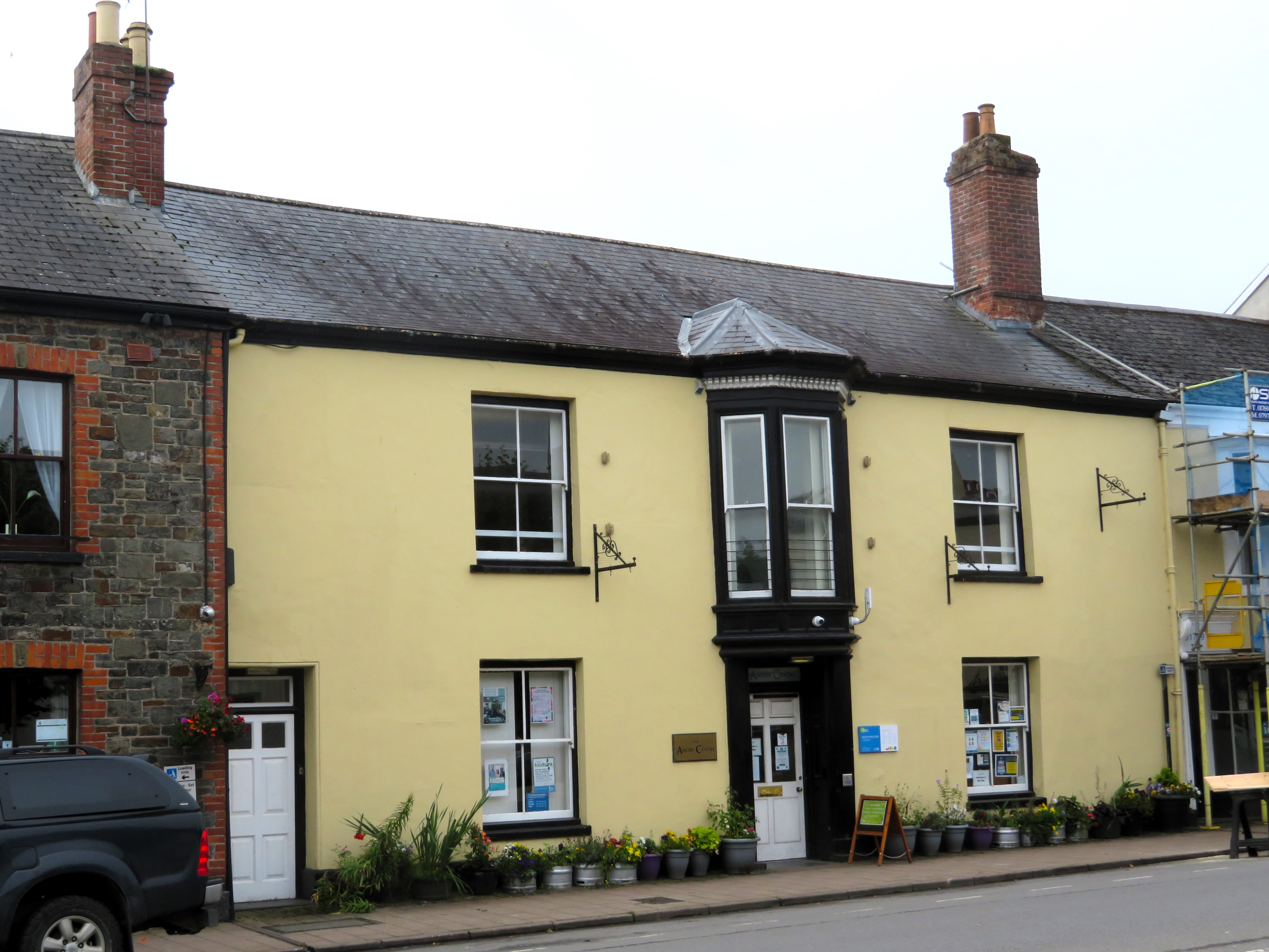
Amory Centre, 125 High Street: Town Council's offices and library.

There are three tiers of local government covering South Molton, at parish (town), district and county level: South Molton Town Council, North Devon Council (based in Barnstaple) and Devon County Council (based in Exeter). South Molton Town Council is based at the Amory Centre at 125 East Street, which also serves as an area office for North Devon Council.

South Molton was an ancient borough, having been incorporated by Elizabeth I in 1590. It was reformed to become a municipal borough in 1836, governed by a corporate body officially called the "mayor, aldermen and burgesses of the borough of South Molton", generally known as the corporation or town council. The council met at the Town Hall (also known as the Guildhall) on Broad Street, first completed in 1743. In 1926 the council bought 1 East Street and converted it to become their main offices.

Between 1901 and 1961 the population of South Molton was relatively static; in 1901 the population was 2,848 and in 1961 it was 2,993. By the 1960s the town was unusually small for somewhere with borough status. The government introduced a new type of borough called rural boroughs in 1958, allowing such small boroughs to be absorbed into a neighbouring district whilst retaining certain civic dignities. South Molton was converted to become a rural borough in 1967, becoming part of the surrounding South Molton Rural District. The town council thereafter had the powers of a parish council, but with some additional ceremonial powers, such as the ability to appoint a mayor.

Local government was reformed again in 1974 under the Local Government Act 1972, with South Molton Rural District Council being abolished and the area being transferred to the new district of North Devon. The rural borough of South Molton was converted into a civil parish at the same time, but parishes were given the right to declare themselves to be towns and appoint a mayor, which the parish council at South Molton duly did, allowing it to take the name South Molton Town Council.

The town council continued to be based at 1 East Street until 2008 when it moved to new premises at the Amory Centre at 125 East Street. Council meetings are held both at the Amory Centre and the Town Hall.

== Education ==
There are good local educational facilities, South Molton Community College which is a state secondary school rated as a specialist technology college.

South Molton Primary School was one of the schools studied in the 1950s by Iona and Peter Opie.

== Media ==
Local TV coverage is provided by BBC South West and ITV West Country. Television signals are received from the nearby Huntshaw Cross TV transmitter, Caradon Hill TV transmitter can also be received in the town.

Local radio stations are BBC Radio Devon on 94.8 FM, Radio Exe Devon on DAB, Heart West on 96.2 FM, The Voice on 106.1 FM and Soundwave Radio, a community based station that broadcast online.

The town is served by the local newspaper, North Devon Gazette.

== Notable buildings ==
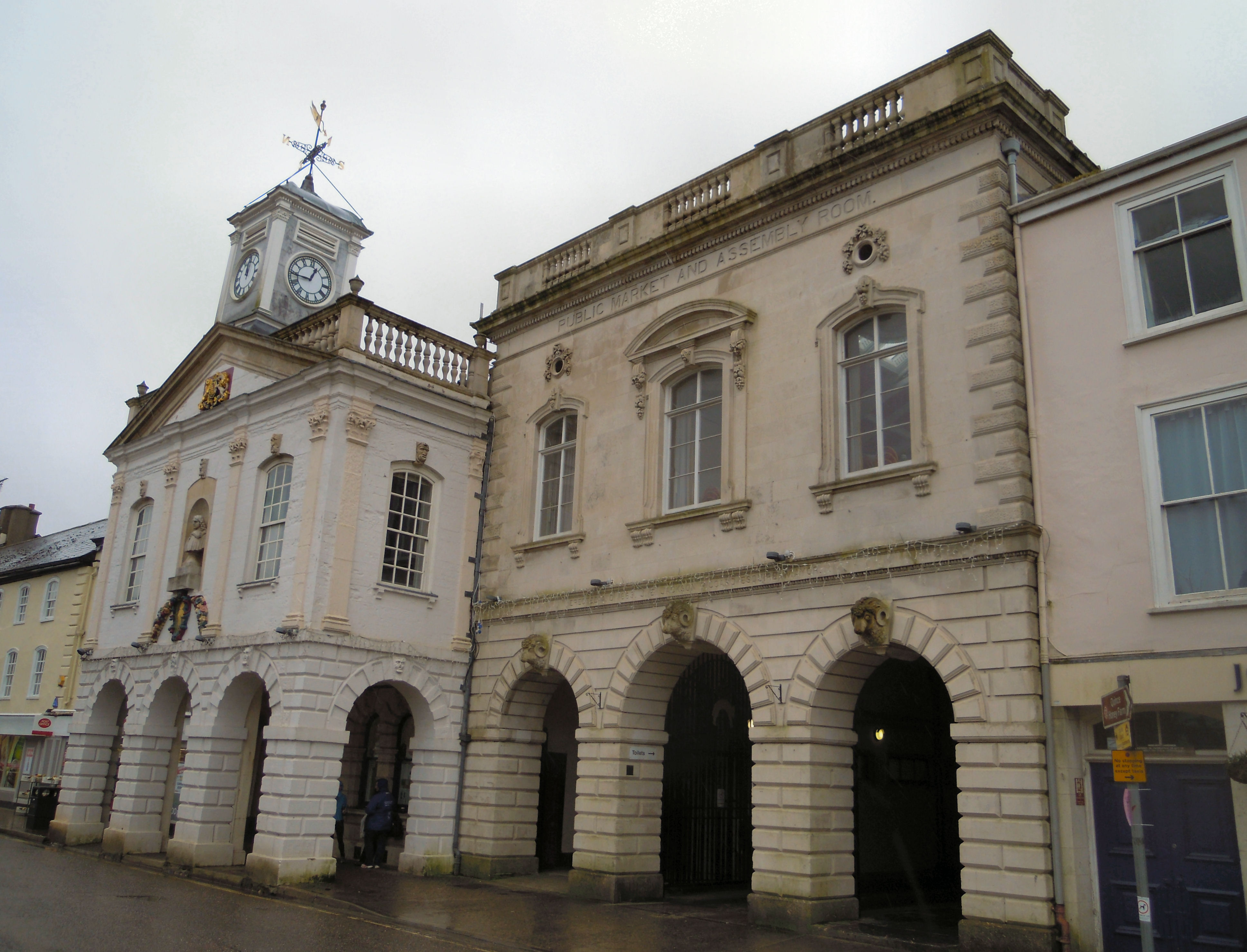
The Guildhall was constructed between 1739 and 1743

The Guildhall, constructed between 1739 and 1743, contains many ornamental features and entire rooms from Stowe House in Cornwall, built by the Earl of Bath in 1675 and dismantled in 1739. The building is a Grade I listed building on the Register of Historic England. Behind it is the town's Pannier Market.

== Hugh Squier ==
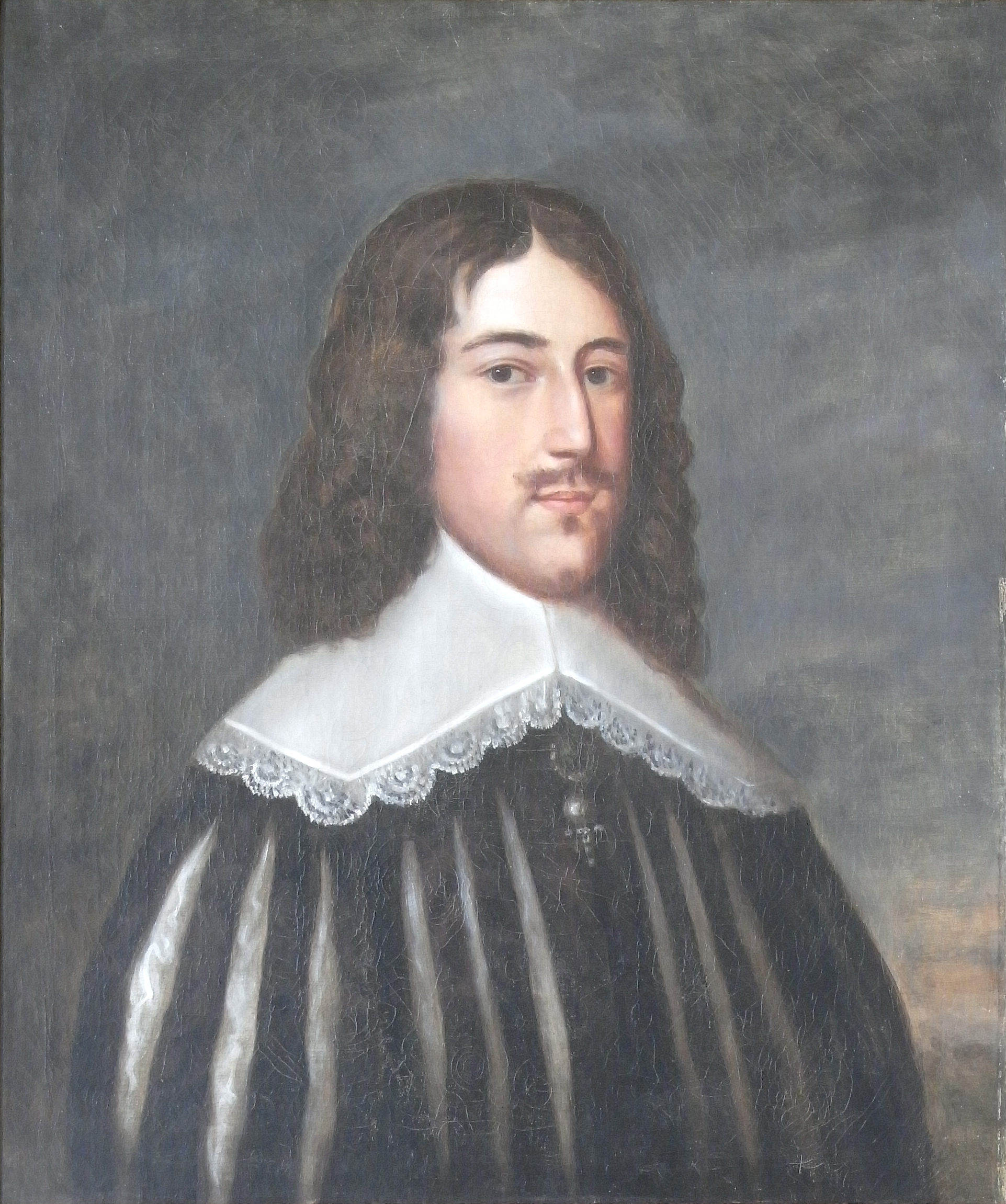
Portrait of Hugh Squier (1625–1710), Town Hall, South Molton

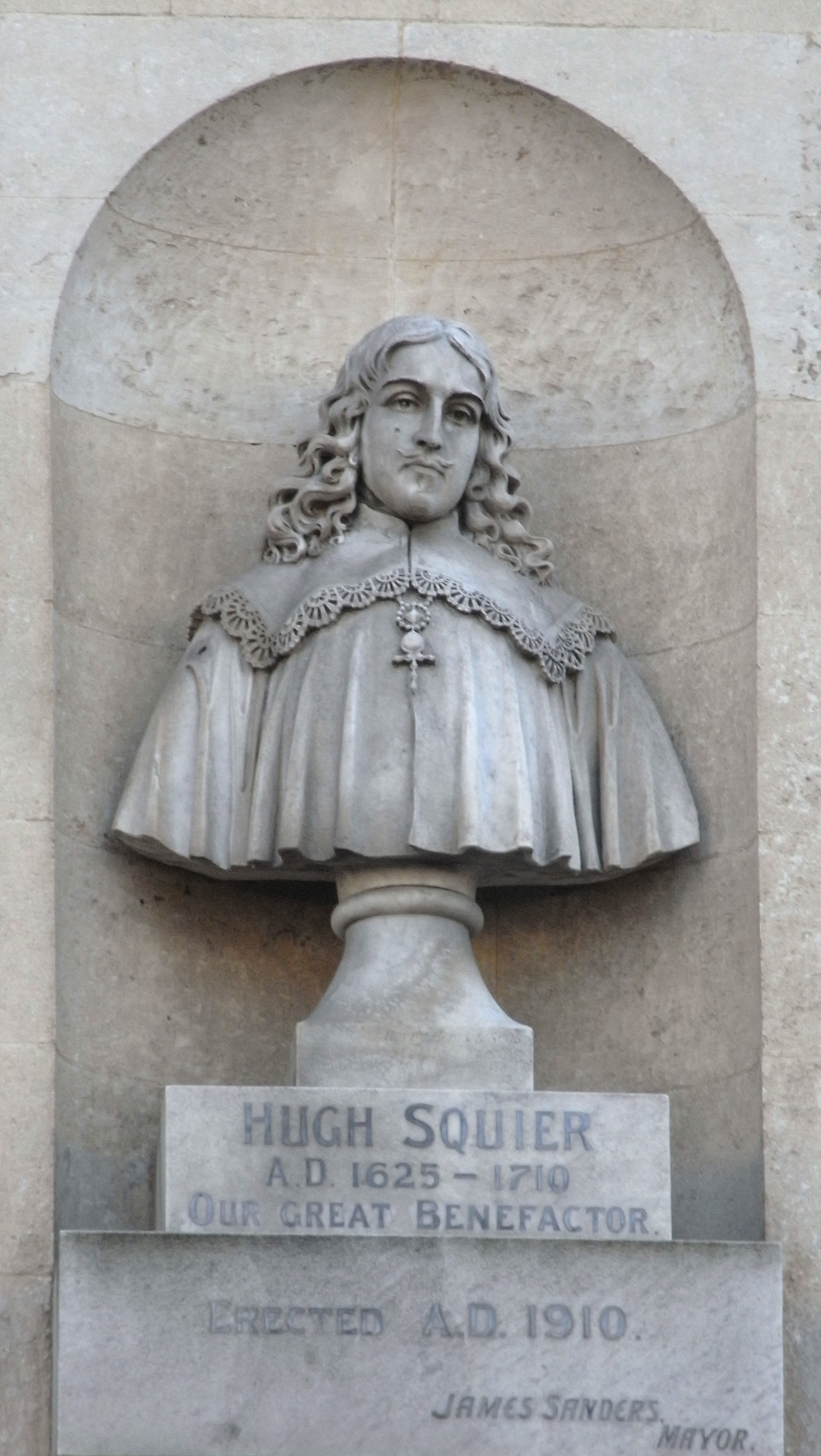
Stone bust of Hugh Squier (1625–1710), within an aedicule on facade of South Molton Town Hall. Inscribed on plinths: "Hugh Squier AD 1625-1710. Our great benefactor. Erected AD 1910, James Sanders, Mayor"

Hugh Squier (1625–1710), a wealthy local merchant, was a great benefactor of South Molton. Son of William Squier of Townhouse, now a farmhouse about 1 mile west of the town, he made his fortune in London and returned home at the age of 29. He purchased the lordship of the manor of South Molton, which feudal position entitled him to the fees and tolls levied at the town's markets and fairs.

His children all died young and having no heirs he thus decided to devote his wealth to philanthropical causes in his native town. In 1686 he built and endowed a grammar school in East Street, South Molton, known as Hugh Squier's Free School. The original Deed of Endowment and Appointment of Trustees is held at North Devon Record Office in Barnstaple. In 1877 it was amalgamated with the Blue Coat School, founded in 1711, and with the National Schools, founded in 1833. The combined school was known as South Molton United School.

At his death, he left £2,314 to the Corporation of South Molton for cleansing and repairing the streets, along with bequests from his estate in the parish of Swimbridge and the rectory of North Molton which he had acquired. A contemporary portrait of him exists in the Mayor's Parlour in the Town Hall, and a stone bust of him made in 1910, apparently copied from the painting, is displayed on the facade of the same building. A medallion portrait of him hangs from the chain of office of the mayor.

== Notable people ==
- Sir John Doddridge (1555–1628), lawyer, antiquarian and writer, Justice of the King's Bench & MP.
- Hugh Squier (1625-1710), merchant, see para above
- Samuel Badcock (1747–1788), a nonconformist minister, theological writer and literary critic.
- Aaron Buzacott (1800–1864), missionary, did South Seas missionary work of the London Missionary Society and lived on Rarotonga (one of the Cook Islands) from 1828 to 1857.
- Ethel Coleridge (1883–1976), an actress, best known for her roles in the original Aldwych farces.
- John Widgery, Baron Widgery (1911–1981), a judge who served as Lord Chief Justice of England from 1971 to 1980, he presided over the Widgery Tribunal on the events of Bloody Sunday.
- Emma Sing (2001-), England Rugby international and World Cup winner 2025 Women's Rugby World Cup.

== See also ==
- South Molton (UK Parliament constituency) (1885–1950)
- Mayor of South Molton
