= Omnes =

Omnes is a Breton surname as well as a Latin word. It may refer to "everyone" or "all"

== People ==
- Philippe Omnes (born August 6, 1960) is a French fencer and olympic champion in foil competition.
- Roland Omnès is the author of several books which aim to close the gap between our common sense experience of the classical world and the complex, formal mathematics which is now required to accurately describe reality at its most fundamental level.

== Titles and phrases ==
- Adversus omnes haereses, disambiguation.
- Bellum omnium contra omnes is the description that Thomas Hobbes gives to human existence in the state of nature.
- Erga omnes is frequently used in legal terminology describing obligations or rights toward all.
- extrā omnēs (Latin: 'Out, all of you.', 'Everybody else, out'- at the list of Latin phrases) is a phrase pronounced at the beginning of a conclave when the doors to the Sistine Chapel are shut.
- Etiam si omnes, ego non is the Latin version of a phrase from the Gospel of Matthew.
- Orientales omnes Ecclesias (December 23, 1945) is an encyclical of Pope Pius XII to the faithful of the Ukrainian Greek Catholic Church.
- Unus pro omnibus, omnes pro uno is known as being the motto of Alexandre Dumas' Three Musketeers and is also the traditional motto of Switzerland.

== Places ==
- Omnes - Hamilton, Ontario is a vintage, streetwear clothing and shoe shop specializing in sneakers and clothing located in Hamilton, Ontario, Canada.
