= Robert Throckmorton (courtier) =

English politician and courtier (c. 1513–1581)

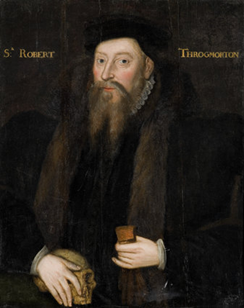
"Sr. Robert Throgmorton", Sir Robert Throckmorton (1513–1581). He holds a skull in his right hand. 16th century English. Throckmorton Collection, Coughton Court, Warwickshire. Property of the National Trust

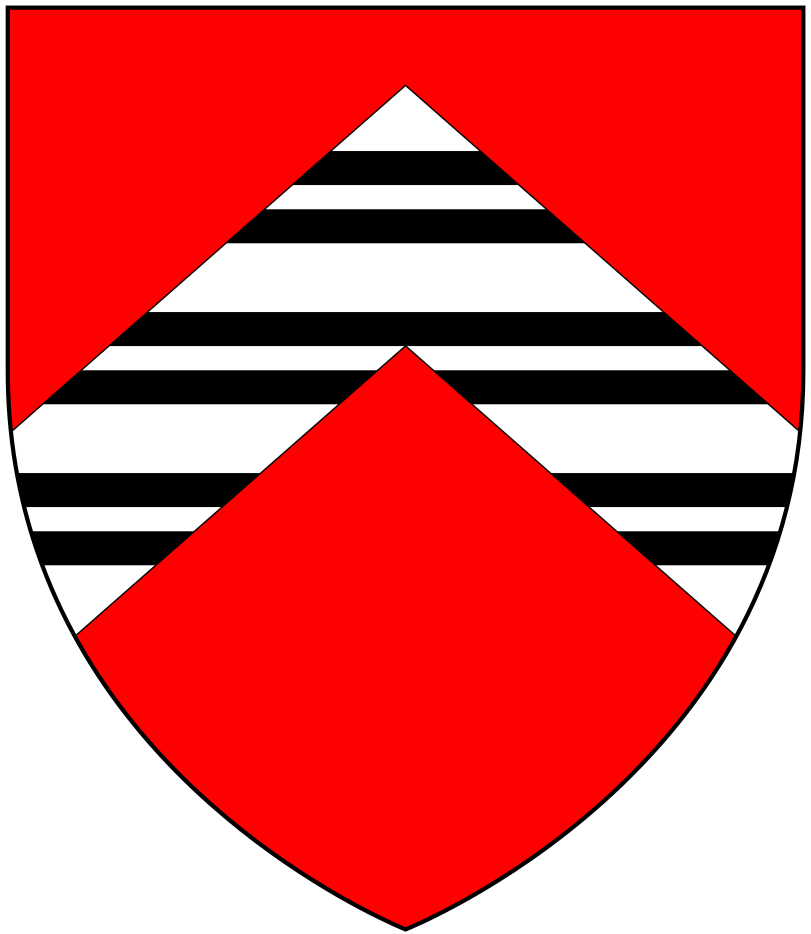
Arms of Throckmorton: Gules, on a chevron argent three bars gemelles sable

Sir Robert Throckmorton (c. 1513 – 12 February 1581), of Coughton Court in Warwickshire, was an English Member of Parliament and courtier. His public career was impeded by his remaining a Roman Catholic.

== Origins ==
Born around 1513, Robert Throckmorton was the eldest son and heir of Sir George Throckmorton (died 1552) by Katherine Vaux, daughter of Nicholas Vaux, 1st Baron Vaux of Harrowden (died 1523) by his first wife Elizabeth FitzHugh. He had several notable brothers, in descending seniority: Sir Kenelm Throckmorton, Sir Clement Throckmorton MP, Sir Nicholas Throckmorton (1515–1571), Thomas, Sir John Throckmorton (1524–1580), Anthony, and George.

== Politics ==
Robert Throckmorton may have trained at the Middle Temple, the inn attended by his father. At least three of his younger brothers and his own eldest son trained there, but as the heir to extensive estates, he had little need for a career in justice or government. He was joined with his father in several stewardships from 1527 and was perhaps the servant of Robert Tyrwhitt, a distant relative by marriage of the Throckmortons, who in 1540 took an inventory of Cromwell's goods at Mortlake. He attended the reception of Anne of Cleves.

With several of his brothers, he took part in the French war of 1544. Three years later he was placed on the Warwickshire bench, and in 1553 he was appointed High Sheriff of Warwickshire. He was also elected as a knight of the shire (MP) for Warwickshire in 1553 and 1555. Three of his brothers likewise sat for Parliament, Nicholas as knight of the shire for Northamptonshire.

Throckmorton's role in the succession crisis of 1553 is unknown, but his standing with Queen Mary is shown by her reputed answer to the news of Edward VI's death sent her by four of his brothers: "If Robert had been there she durst have gaged her life and hazarded the hap."

In the autumn of 1553, Throckmorton was knighted and appointed constable of Warwick Castle. According to the History of Parliament, only his term as sheriff prevented him from continuing to sit for the shire, until in 1558 he gave way to his eldest son, Thomas.

== Religion ==
His adherence to Roman Catholicism explains his disappearance from the House of Commons in the new reign, although the most Catholic of his brothers, Anthony Throckmorton, was to sit in the Parliament of 1563. Judged an "adversary of true religion" in 1564, Throckmorton remained active in Warwickshire until his refusal to subscribe to the Act of Uniformity led to his removal from the commission of the peace.

In 1577, the Bishop of Worcester, John Whitgift, listed Throckmorton as a Catholic and reckoned him to be worth 1,000 marks a year in lands and £1,000 in goods.

== Family ==
Throckmorton continued the family's Catholic tradition. He married his children into leading Catholic families, in generations when increased persecution of Catholics led to many of his relatives becoming involved in plots against the throne. The sons of his daughters Anne and Muriel were Robert Catesby and Francis Tresham, both conspirators in the Gunpowder Plot of 1605, while a third daughter, Mary, was married to Edward Arden, who was also convicted of treason and executed for his part in a plot to assassinate Queen Elizabeth in 1583.

His daughter Mary left a detailed record of her life as a woman persecuted for recusancy, documenting the fines levied and the searches made at Coughton Court, which is still in the family archives. A nephew, Francis Throckmorton, was executed in 1584 for acting as a go-between for Mary, Queen of Scots and the Spanish Ambassador in an attempt to invade England and place Mary on the throne. A niece, Elizabeth, also known as "Bess", the daughter of Sir Nicholas and a lady-in-waiting to Queen Elizabeth, also gave offence by secretly marrying Sir Walter Raleigh.

== Death and burial ==
Robert Throckmorton died on 12 February 1581, six days after making a will in which he styled himself as being of Weston Underwood, Buckinghamshire, but asked to be buried at Coughton, where an alabaster and marble tomb was accordingly erected to his memory. There is a portrait of him at Coughton Court. He named as executors his eldest son Thomas, and his sons-in-law, Sir John Goodwin and Ralph Sheldon, and as overseers another son-in-law Sir Thomas Tresham and his "loving friend" Edmund Plowden.

== Marriages and issue ==
Throckmorton married first Muriel Berkeley (died 1542), the daughter of Thomas Berkeley, 5th Baron Berkeley (1472–1532), by his first wife, Eleanor Constable (c. 1485–1527), daughter of Sir Marmaduke Constable (c. 1456–1518), by whom he had a son and four daughters:

- Thomas Throckmorton of Coughton (1534 – 13 March 1615), who married, about 1556, Mary Whorwood (c. 1535 – 28 April 1607), by whom he had two sons, including John Throckmorton (1580–1614/15), esquire, father of Robert Throckmorton, 1st Baronet (1599–1650), and five daughters.
- Elizabeth Throckmorton (born c. 1535), who married Sir John Goodwin (died 1596/97) of Winchendon, Buckinghamshire.
- Katherine Throckmorton (c. 1532 – 12 February 1580), who married firstly Henry Norwood (c. 1523 – 1556) of Leckhampton, Gloucestershire, son of Ralph Norwood (died 1560/61) and Jane Knight, by whom she had issue including William Norwood (1548–1632), who married Elizabeth Lygon; she married secondly John Williams.
- Mary Throckmorton (died 1603), who married Edward Arden of Park Hall, executed at Smithfield 20 December 1583, by whom she had a son, Robert Arden, and two daughters: Margaret Arden, who married John Somerville, and Catherine Arden, who married Sir Edward Devereux, 1st Baronet of Castle Bromwich, son of Walter Devereux, 1st Viscount Hereford.
- Anne Throckmorton (1540–1603), who in 1557 married Ralph Sheldon (c. 1537–1613) of Beoley.

Throckmorton married, secondly in about 1542, Elizabeth Hussey (c. 1510 – 23 January 1554), widow of Walter Hungerford, 1st Baron Hungerford of Heytesbury (died 1540), by whom she had been notoriously ill-treated, and daughter of John Hussey, 1st Baron Hussey of Sleaford (1465–1537) by his second wife, Lady Anne Grey (c. 1490 – after 1537). By his second wife Throckmorton had four daughters:

- Muriel Throckmorton (died 1615), who married Sir Thomas Tresham (1543–1605) of Rushton Hall, Northamptonshire, by whom she was the mother of the conspirator, Francis Tresham.
- Anne Throckmorton (died after 1605), who married Sir William Catesby (1547–1598) of Lapworth, Warwickshire, on 9 June 1566 at Ashby St. Ledgers, Northamptonshire, and had children, including Robert Catesby.
- Elizabeth Throckmorton, who married Sir Anthony Tyringham of Tyringham, Buckinghamshire, by whom she had a daughter, Elizabeth Tyringham, who married Sir Robert Fisher, the first of the Fisher baronets.
- Temperance Throckmorton, who married Sir Randal Brereton (died 1611), by whom she had no issue.

== Notes ==
Parliament of England
Preceded by Unknown	Member of Parliament for Warwickshire; 1553	Succeeded by Unknown
