= Luis de Carvajal =

Luis de Carvajal may refer to:

- Luis de Carvajal (theologian), Spanish Franciscan theologian
- Luis de Carvajal (painter) (1531–after 1618), Spanish painter
- Luis de Carvajal y de la Cueva (c. 1537–1591), Spanish-Portuguese adventurer, slave-trader and governor
- Luis de Carvajal the Younger (c. 1566–1596), Crypto-Jewish writer and martyr, and nephew of Luis de Carvajal y de la Cueva
