= Elizabeth Hussey, Baroness Hungerford =

English noblewoman (c.1510–1554)

- Born: c. 1510; Sleaford, Lincolnshire, England
- Died: 23 January 1554
- Buried: St. Laurence's Church, Weston Underwood, Buckinghamshire, England
- Spouses: Walter Hungerford, 1st Baron Hungerford of Heytesbury, Sir Robert Throckmorton
- Father: John Hussey, 1st Baron Hussey of Sleaford
- Mother: Anne Grey, Baroness Hussey

Elizabeth Hussey, Baroness Hungerford (c. 1510 – 1554) was an English noblewoman who was allegedly imprisoned by her first husband for four years. She was married to Walter Hungerford, 1st Baron Hungerford of Heytesbury until his execution, then to Sir Robert Throckmorton of Coughton. Through her daughters she was grandmother to two of the Gunpowder Plot conspirators, Robert Catesby and Francis Tresham.

== Early life ==
Hussey was born about 1510 in Sleaford, Lincolnshire. She was the daughter of John Hussey, 1st Baron Hussey of Sleaford (c. 1465 – 1537) and Anne Grey, Baroness Hussey (c.1490–1545). Her parents held high positions at the Tudor court. Her father was a member of the House of Lords, a Chamberlain to King Henry VIII's daughter, Mary I and travelled to France to take part in the Field of the Cloth of Gold meeting between Henry VIII and Francis I of France in 1520. Her mother was a close friend of Catherine of Aragon. She was also one of Mary's personal attendants, a member of her court and was imprisoned in the Tower of London for continuing to call her Princess after this had been forbidden by the King.

== Marriages ==
Hussey married firstly Walter Hungerford, 1st Baron Hungerford of Heytesbury (died 1540), as his third wife, in 1532. He was the only child of Sir Edward Hungerford (died 1522) of Farleigh Hungerford, Somerset, and his first wife, Jane, daughter of John, Lord Zouche of Harringworth.

Hungerford's treatment of his wife, which she endured for years, was remarkable for its brutality. In an appeal for protection which she addressed to Thomas Cromwell, chief minister of King Henry VIII, in about 1536, Hussey asserted that her husband had kept her incarcerated at Farleigh Castle for four years, had starved her and endeavoured on several occasions to poison her. She begged Cromwell to work to grant her a divorce from him, and he duly commissioned William Petrie and Thomas Benet to advance a bill in Parliament regarding the matter of the marriage.

Around this time, her husband was already falling from favour and the privy council investigated unsavoury rumours about him. He, together with his personal chaplain William Bird, Rector of Fittleton and Vicar of Bradford, were accused of sympathising with the Pilgrimage of Grace. Secondly, Hungerford was accused of having instructed a chaplain named Dr Maudlin to practise conjuring and magic to "compass or imagine" the king's death. Lastly, he was accused of committing sodomy with William Master and Thomas Smith, two of his servants, which was forbidden by the Buggery Act 1533. Hussey's husband was charged on all of the three crimes, was attainted by act of parliament and was beheaded at Tower Hill on 28 July 1540. Hussey had escaped from her marriage by the conviction of her husband and was now a widow.

She married secondly Sir Robert Throckmorton of Coughton, Warwickshire (d. 1586), as his second wife.

They had four daughters, who were raised in the Catholic faith of their ancestors:

- Muriel Throckmorton (c. 1547/50–1615), who married in 1566 Sir Thomas Tresham (1543–1605) of Rushton Hall, Northamptonshire and a ward of Sir Throckmorton. They had six daughters and four sons, including Francis Tresham, a conspirator of the failed Gunpowder Plot of 1605
- Anne Throckmorton (died after 1605), who married Sir William Catesby (1547–1598) of Lapworth, Warwickshire, on 9 June 1566 at Ashby St. Ledgers, Northamptonshire. They had children, including Robert Catesby, a conspirator of the failed Gunpowder Plot of 1605.
- Elizabeth Throckmorton, who married Sir Anthony Tyringham of Tyringham, Buckinghamshire, by whom she had a daughter, Elizabeth Tyringham, who married Sir Robert Fisher, the first of the Fisher baronets of Packington Magna.
- Temperance Throckmorton, who married Sir Randal Brereton (died 1611), by whom she had no issue.

== Death and monumental brass effigy ==
Hussey died on 23 January 1554 and was buried in the Throckmorton family vault at St. Laurence's Church, Weston Underwood, Buckinghamshire.

A monumental brass effigy of her survives in the church, located at the east end of the floor of the south aisle. She is depicted wearing an embroidered gown with slashed sleeves and her head has a modern replacement.

The Latin inscription reads "Hie jacet tumulata dna Elizabetha Hungerford una filiaru dni Hussey que primum nupta fuit dno Gualtero Hungerford et nuper vxor Roberti Throkmarton Militis que obiit xxiii die Januarii Anno dni Mccccclxxi". This translates to: "Here lies buried Mrs. Elizabeth Hungerford, one of the children of Mr. Hussey, who was first married to Mr. Walter Hungerford, and late the wife of Robert Throckmarton, a soldier, who died the 23rd day of January, in the year of Mcccclxx".
