= John Hussey, 1st Baron Hussey of Sleaford =

Chief Butler of England (c. 1465–1537)

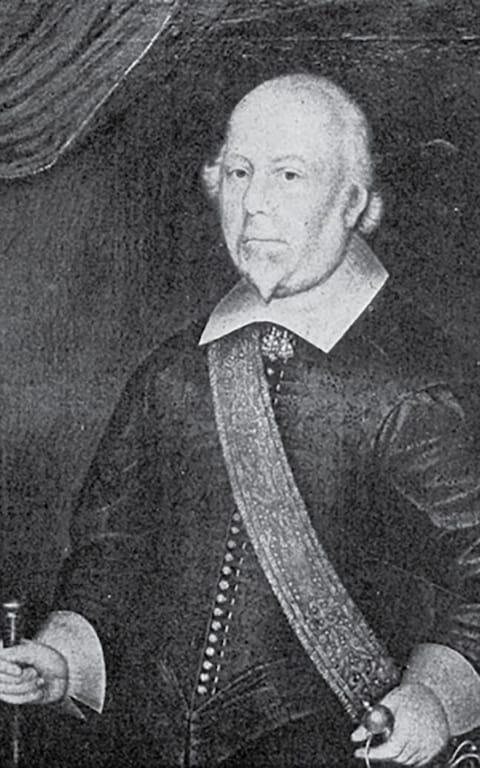

Personal details
- Born: 1465/1466 Sleaford, Lincolnshire, England
- Died: 29 June 1537 (aged c. 70) Lincoln, Lincolnshire, England
- Spouse(s): Margaret Blount; Anne de Grey
- Children: 12
- Parent(s): Sir William Hussey; Elizabeth Berkeley
- Occupation: Chief Butler of England

John Hussey, 1st Baron Hussey of Sleaford (sometimes spelled Hosey, Husey, Hussie, Huse; 1465/1466 – 29 June 1537) was Chief Butler of England from 1521 until his death. He was a member of the House of Lords, and a Chamberlain to King Henry VIII's daughter, Queen Mary I.

== Early years ==
Hussey was born in Sleaford, Lincolnshire, England, son of Sir William Hussey, an English judge and Chief Justice of the King's Bench. His mother was the former Elizabeth Berkeley. Hussey's siblings included Sir Robert Hussey (d. 1546), the father of Elizabeth Hussey, the 'Mistress Crane' at whose home at East Molesey the first of the Marprelate tracts, Martin's Epistle, was printed in October 1588; Elizabeth Hussey, who married Richard Grey, 3rd Earl of Kent; and Mary Hussey, who married William Willoughby, 11th Baron Willoughby de Eresby.

In 1497, at the Battle of Blackheath, Hussey was knighted. Six years later, he was made "Knight of the Body", bodyguard to King Henry VII, followed by an appointment as "Master of Lyfield Forest", Rutland in 1505 and Comptroller of the Household in 1509. On 16 August 1513, at Tournai, after the Battle of the Spurs, he and his brother William were promoted to Knights Banneret by Henry VIII.

== Career ==
In 1493 Hussey was appointed Sheriff of Lincolnshire and by 1513 he was custos rotulorum for the county. In June 1520 he travelled to France to take part in the Field of the Cloth of Gold meeting between Henry VIII and Francis I, King of France. On 6 July 1523, he was elected Member of Parliament as a knight of the shire for Lincolnshire. Three years later, on 5 February 1526, he was appointed a judge.

He was created Lord Hussey, of Sleaford, by King Henry VIII in 1529. On 3 November 1529 he was re-elected to Parliament as knight of the shire for Lincolnshire but received a Writs of Summons on 1 December 1529 to the House of Lords as 'Johannes Hussey de sleford, chivaler'. In June 1530, Hussey was named Lincolnshire Castle's Commissioner for Gaol Delivery, and later that same year, Hussey sold some of his large holdings (the Somersetshire manors of Batheaston, Bathampton, Bathford, Twerton; the Wiltshire manors of Compton Bassett, Comerwell, and North Wraxall).

Henry VIII "lodged" at Hussey's Sleaford estate where he held court the next morning before venturing to York to meet with the King of Scotland.

On 10 September 1533, Lord Hussey attended the christening of Elizabeth, daughter of Henry VIII and Anne Boleyn, and carried the canopy over the three-day-old child with George Boleyn, Viscount Rochford, Lord Thomas Howard, and William Howard, 1st Baron Howard of Effingham.

Hussey was Chamberlain to King Henry's daughter, Mary, while Hussey's second wife, Lady Anne, was one of Mary's attendants. Though King Henry forbade anyone from calling his daughter, Mary, by the title of Princess, Lady Anne did do so, after which she lost her attendant position around June 1534 and was imprisoned in the Tower of London in August. Asking for the King's pardon, she was released before the end of the year.

In addition to his responsibilities at Court and Parliament, Hussey was steward to John Longland, the conservative Bishop of Lincoln, and King Henry's confessor.

== Downfall ==
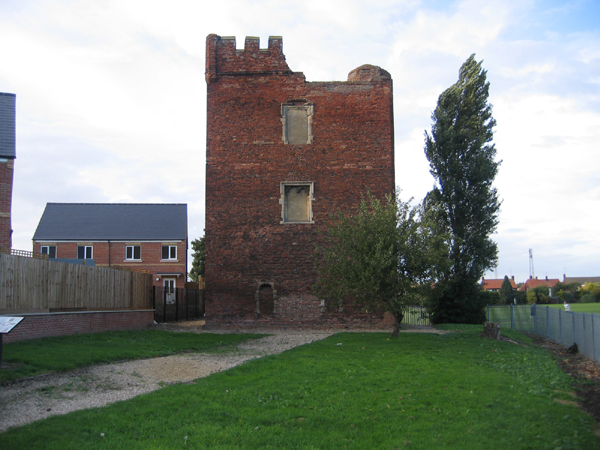
Hussey Tower: The ruins of Lord Hussey's medieval manor house – Hussey Tower – are all that is left following the orders of King Henry VIII to destroy it.

Hussey was implicated along with his cousin Lord Darcy as complicit in the 1536 uprising known as the Pilgrimage of Grace. Though Hussey denied participation in the rebellion, he was accused of conspiring to change laws and depose the king, and that he abetted those who made war on the king in October 1536. The charges may have been levied in part because of Hussey's Catholic sympathies, and because Hussey and his wife, having served 'Princess' Mary, were partisans on her behalf. Hussey was indicted and tried for treason, and found guilty by the House of Lords. He was beheaded in Lincoln on 29 June 1537, while his cousin, Thomas Darcy, was executed on Tower Hill. Hussey's statement ("confession") survives.

== Family ==
John Hussey firstly married Margaret Barr (née Blount), widow of Sir John Barr and daughter of Sir Simon Blount, around 1492 at Keynsham, Gloucestershire, by whom he had issue:

- Sir William Hussey (c. 1493 – 19 January 1556)
- Thomas Hussey (c. 1495)
- Gilbert Hussey (c. 1499)

John Hussey secondly married Lady Anne Grey in 1509 at Sleaford, Lincolnshire. According to historian Sir William Dugdale, in the documents written by Hussey, shortly before his death in 1537, he speaks of his wife as 'Anne'. She was the daughter of George Grey, 2nd Earl of Kent – by his second wife, Catherine Herbert. Lady Anne's paternal grandmother was Lady Katherine Percy, the great-great-granddaughter of King Edward III. John Hussey and Lady Anne Grey had issue, including:

- Sir Giles Hussey (c. 1495/1505) – Knighted by the Earl of Surrey at the Sacking of Morlaix in France in 1522, who married Jane Pigot, and had issue.
- Elizabeth Hussey (c. 1497)
- Reginald Hussey (c. 1501)
- Thomas Hussey
- Joan Hussey, wife of Sir Roger Forster.
- Elizabeth Hussey, she married firstly Walter Hungerford, Baron Hungerford of Heytesbury as his third wife; and married secondly Sir Robert Throckmorton of Coughton, Warwickshire (d. 1586) as his second wife. She had four daughters and two sons
- Bridget Hussey (c. 1526 – 13 January 1600/1601), married successively: Sir Richard Morrison of Cashiobury, Hertfordshire (d. 17 March 1556); Henry Manners, 2nd Earl of Rutland before 1563; and Francis Russell, 2nd Earl of Bedford on 25 June 1566, as his second wife, and had no issue.
- Anne (or Agnes) Hussey, married to Sir Humphrey Browne, Justice of the Common Pleas, by whom she was the mother of Christian Browne, wife of Sir John Tufton, 1st Baronet.
- Dorothy Hussey, who married three times, thirdly to Thomas Pallister, and had issue.
- Mary Hussey

After his execution, Hussey's home in Sleaford, as well as his other estates, were confiscated by the crown. In 1563, his children were restored in Parliament during the reign of Queen Elizabeth I of England, but Hussey's title was forfeited, and the estates were not returned.

== Claim of Hussey Barony ==
The coat of arms of the Hussey Barony. It is also used by the descendants of Lord Hussey.

Lord Hussey's brother – Sir Robert Hussey and his son Sir Charles Hussey – adapted to the political requirements of the recently established Church of England; both serving in the office of sheriff. However, the descendants of the anti-Church of England Lord Hussey, whose barony and estates were forfeited, were left in far less secure positions, both regarding their financial and social status.

Lord Hussey's descendants included Molineux Disney, a direct descendant of Sir William Hussey, who was the "Son and Heir to the said John Lord Hussey". On 21 March 1680, Molineux Disney made a claim to King Charles II that as, "son and heir, in the direct line to Lord Hussey" he was entitled to claim the Hussey barony. However, W. B. Turnbull noted in 1836 that "no entry occurs in the Lords' Journal relative to any proceedings upon it". Molineux had apparently withdrawn his application.

== Honours ==
- 6 December 1533, John Fewterer, Confessor-General of Syon Abbey, dedicated his book, The myrrour or glasse of Christes passion, to "the Honorable 'Lord Husey', from Syon".

== Sources ==
- Doe, Norman (2004). "Hussey, Sir William (d. 1495)". Oxford Dictionary of National Biography (online ed.). Oxford University Press. doi:10.1093/ref:odnb/14271. (Subscription, Wikipedia Library access or UK public library membership required.)
- Foster, Joseph (1883). The Royal Lineage of Our Noble and Gentle Families. London: Hazell, Watson and Viney. p. 93.
- Gunn, Steven (2016). Henry VII's New Men and the Making of Tudor England. Oxford University Press.
- Hamilton, John. "Hussey, William" . In Lee, Sidney (ed.). Dictionary of National Biography. Vol. 28. London: Smith, Elder & Co. p. 332.
- Maddison, A.R., ed. (1903). Lincolnshire Pedigrees, Vol. II. Vol. LI. London: Harleian Society. pp. 526–32.
- Cutter, W. R. (2000). Genealogical and Personal Memoirs: Relating to the Families of Boston and Eastern Massachusetts – SMITH and Hussey families; Lieut. John Smith (d.1752), grandson of Capt. Christopher Hussey (d.1686). Genealogical Publishing Com. pp. 1176–1178. ISBN 9780806345499.
- Clarke, Roy Leggitt (December 1995). Finton, Kenneth Harper (ed.). THE HUSSEY CONNECTION TO THE PLANTAGENET LINEAGE (PDF). Heliotrope. pp. 330–376. "There is much information on the Hussey's going back to King John of the Plantagenet's.....The Hussey family had lost their land holdings a few generations before for political reasons, but retained their title without benefit of land. There is the distinct possibility that John is indeed the son of George Hussey. – by Kenneth Harper Finton, Editor"
- The Register of the Kentucky Historical Society. Original from the University of Virginia: Kentucky Historical Society. 1962. p. 55. "The Husseys, who came from England via Holland with Governor Winthrop on March 9, 1632, were descended from Lord Hussey, chief butler of England under Henry VIII. He was beheaded in 1537 for favoring the pilgrimage of grace. He lived in Boston, Lincolnshire."

Peerage of England
New creation	Baron Hussey; 1529–1537	Forfeit
