= John Somerville (conspirator) =

Conspirator against Elizabeth I of England

John Somerville (1560–1583) was the son of John Somerville (d. in or after 1579), of Edstone, Warwickshire, and Elizabeth Corbett of Lee, Shropshire.

Somerville publicly exclaimed his desire and intention to assassinate Elizabeth I of England. However, it is likely that he was of unsound mind, and had neither the inclination nor capacity to carry out his threat. Nevertheless, the deeply suspicious Elizabethan security services took him seriously; perhaps as a precaution or to make an example, he was imprisoned in the Tower of London and tortured. He was alleged to have hanged himself in jail before he could be executed.

Somerville's outburst had dire consequences for his kin. His father-in-law, Edward Arden was also arrested, tortured, tried and found guilty of treason by Christopher Wray. He was executed at Smithfield on 20 December 1583. His wife and daughter were also imprisoned in the Tower but later spared.

While it is possible that the Somerville and Arden case was dealt with maliciously by Robert Dudley, 1st Earl of Leicester, Warwickshire was a stronghold of Catholic recusancy. Moreover, a number of well established, and inter-linked, families of the county, such as the Throckmortons, Catesbys and Treshams were all variously implicated in real conspiracies – including the Gunpowder Plot.

== Marriage and issue ==
Somerville married Margaret Arden, the daughter of Sir Edward Arden of Park Hall by Mary Throckmorton (d.1603), the daughter of Sir Robert Throckmorton and his first wife, Muriel Berkeley, by whom he had two daughters, Elizabeth and Alice.
