= Edward Arden =

English nobleman and head of the Arden family

Edward Arden (c. 1542–1583) was an English nobleman and head of the Arden family, who became a Catholic martyr.

Arden lived in Park Hall, Castle Bromwich, an estate near modern-day Birmingham. He was a recusant Catholic and kept a priest, Hugh Hall, at his house disguised as a gardener. Arden's son-in-law, John Somerville, hatched a plan to assassinate Queen Elizabeth I, but was arrested long before he could attempt it. A purge of Arden's household ensued, and Arden, who may not have known of Somerville's plan, was executed and decapitated.

Arden was related to Mary Arden, mother of William Shakespeare.

== Life ==
He was the head of a Warwick family; his father William died in 1545, and Edward succeeded his grandfather Thomas Arden in 1563. He kept to the old faith and maintained in his home, Park Hall at Castle Bromwich, a priest named Hall, in the disguise of a gardener. This priest influenced John Somerville, Edward Arden's son-in-law, who had had indirect contact with Mary Queen of Scots (she had visited Coventry in 1569).

Somerville talked of shooting the Queen of England, and set out for London. He was arrested, put to the rack, and confessed, implicating his father-in-law in his treason and naming the priest as the instigator. All three were tried and sentenced to death. Somerville strangled himself in his cell (?). Arden was hanged, drawn, and quartered at Smithfield on 20 December 1583, but the priest was spared. Arden's and Somerville's heads were set on London Bridge beside the skull of the Earl of Desmond.

William Camden in his Annals reflected contemporary opinion by saying that Arden's execution was attributable to the malice Robert Dudley, 1st Earl of Leicester, bore towards him. Somerville was thought insane by Lord Burghley.

== Marriage and issue ==
Arden married Mary Throckmorton (died 1603), the daughter of Sir Robert Throckmorton and his first wife, Muriel Berkeley, daughter of Thomas (1472–1533), 5th Baron Berkeley, by Eleanor Constable (c. 1485 – 1527), daughter of Sir Marmaduke Constable, by whom he had a son and two daughters:

- Robert Arden.
- Margaret Arden, who married John Somerville, by whom she had two daughters, Elizabeth and Alice.
- Katherine Arden, who married Sir Edward Devereux, of Castle Bromwich, son of Walter Devereux, 1st Viscount Hereford.
