= Alfonso de Castro =

Spanish theologian

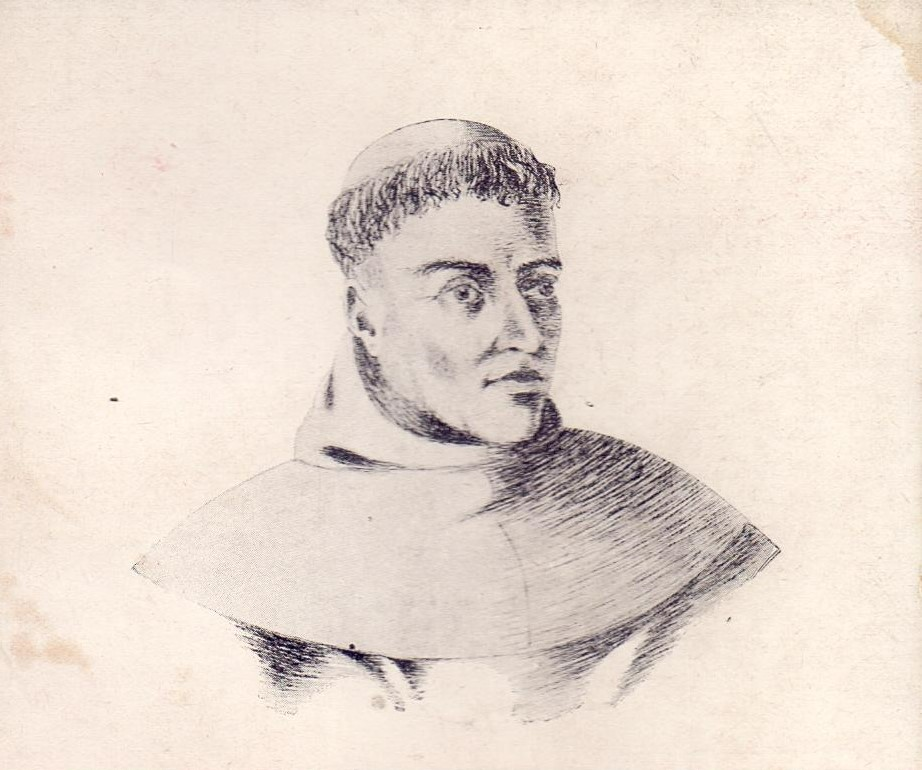
Fr. Alfonso de Castro.

Alfonso de Castro, O.F.M., (1495 in Zamora, Spain – 3 February 1558 in Brussels, Belgium) known also as Alphonsus à Castro, was a Franciscan theologian and jurist. He belongs to the group of theologian-jurists known as the School of Salamanca (otherwise identified as Spanish Late Scholasticism), though he denied belonging to a specific school of thought and condemned many theologians who did. He was most well-known in the sixteenth century for his work Adversus omnes haereses, libri XIV, an encyclopedic treatise on ancient and modern heresies.

== Life ==
Alfonso de Castro entered, at the age of 15, the Franciscan Order and quickly became known as a good preacher. After his studies of theology and philosophy at the University of Alcalá which was established in these years, he became professor at the famous University of Salamanca, where, next to Luis Carvajal and Francisco de Vitoria, he founded the "Renaissance of Theology". According to his commitment in Bruges in 1532 against the doctrine of the Lutherans, he became counselor of emperor Charles V and of the Spanish king Philip II. As he took part in the Council of Trent in 1545–47 and again in 1551-52 he appeared to advocate both the Spanish-imperial interests and the Catholic faith. Philip II, whom Castro accompanied in 1553 and 1554 to his marriage in England, nominated him in 1557 as Archbishop of Santiago de Compostela, but Castro died before the arrival of the Papal Bulls. In his last years, Castro acted as a preacher in Antwerp.

== Works ==
In his works Castro attended himself, basically, to the defense of "true faith" through criminal law. He gave enormous systematic impulses to the criminal law, so that in Spanish literature he was called the "father and founder of criminal law" - padre y fundador del Derecho Penal. Outside of Spain, however, Castro remains nearly unknown.

His first work, Adversus omnes haereses, libri XIV (Paris, 1534; Antwerp, 1556), an alphabetical encyclopedia of heresy, collocates more than 400 species of this crime. This became one of the foundations of persecution of heretics in the sixteenth and seventeenth centuries. It was translated into the French language in 1712.

Castro's second opus, De iusta haereticorum punitione, libri III (Salamanca, 1547), dedicated to Emperor Charles V, made him renowned as "flagellum of heretics" (azote de herejes). With theological and juristic principles he therein aimed at defining the golden mean between Pharisaic damnation and craven sufferance of heresy, the form of reversal to "true faith", the punishment of obstinacy, and the socio-religious causes of heresy. In the work, he interacts with and sometimes debates many of the most famous authors of his time—including, for example, Cardinal Thomas de Vio (Cajetan), O.P.

The equalisation of heresy and magics is the subject of Castro's short commentary on the "Malleus Maleficarum" with the title De impia sortilegarum, Maleficarum, & Lamiarum haeresi, earumque punitione Opvscvlvm (Lyon, 1568). He held that magics as a sort of heresy should be punished by death by fire. The pact with the demons, which is against Catholic faith, should clearly be explored. His treatment of magic and witchcraft in the first book of De iusta haereticorum punitione (see above) is also worth noting.

Castro's chief work in criminal law, however, may be his last publication, De potestate legis poenalis libri duo (Salamanca, 1550; reprinted in Madrid, 1961). This work in detail deals with the notion of the criminal laws (in the meaning of lex), with nature and purpose of penalty and with the relations of delict and penalty. Castro therein presents not only the prescription of analogy and the principle of restrictive interpretation in criminal law, but, with his own radicalness, he acuminates the notion of penalty (poena) completely to the penalty for guilt, and, accordingly and for the first time in history, fits penalty with moral blame. His notion of penalty survives through the canonists Martin de Azpilcueta and Diego de Covarrubias y Leyva in secular criminal law.

After his death the collected works were published in Paris (1565) in four volumes.

Three works have been translated into English. Against All Heresies and On the Just Punishment of Heretics were both translated and edited by Rev. Paul M. Kimball (Dolorosa Press, 2021 and 2024, respectively). These editions match the author’s citations to modern editions (e.g., Migne’s Patrologia series) and add explanatory footnotes, and are over one thousand pages in print, each. De Castro’s defense of the education of Indians was translated by Martin Austin Nesvig for Forgotten Franciscans: Works from an Inquisitional Theorist, a Heretic, and an Inquisitional Deputy (Penn State University Press, 2011).

Spanish translations of his works may be found in 25 Homilías Sobre el Salmo 50 (Miserere), translated and edited by José Félix Álvarez Alonso (Colección Instituto de Estudios Hispánicos en la Modernidad (IEHM), 2020) and Antología: Alfonso de Castro (Breviaros del Pensamiento Español, Fé, 1942).

== Literature ==
- Eloy Bullón y Fernández, Alfonso de Castro y la ciencia penal, Madrid 1900.
- Santiago Castillo Hernández, Alfonso de Castro y el problema de las leyes penales, o, la obligatoriedad moral de las leyes humanas, Salamanca 1941.
- Manuel de Castro, Fr. Alfonso de Castro, O.F.M. (1495-1558), consejero de Carlos V y Felipe II, in: Salmanticensis 6 (1958), pp. 281–322.
- Odilo Gómez Parente, Hacia el cuarto centenario de Fray Alfonso de Castro, fundador del derecho penal (1558-1958). Conferencia pronunciada el 26 de Marzuo de 1957, en la casa de Zamora de Madrid, Madrid 1958.
- Harald Maihold, Strafe für fremde Schuld? Die Systematisierung des Strafbegriffs in der Spanischen Spätscholastik und Naturrechtslehre. Köln u.a. 2005.
- Harald Maihold, Systematiker der Häresien – Erinnerung an Alphonso de Castro (1492-1558), in: Zeitschrift für Rechtsgeschichte, Kan. Abt. 118 (2001), pp. 523 ff.
- Andres de la Mañaricua Neure: La obligatoriedad de la ley penal en Alfonso de Castro, in: Revista Española de Derecho Canónico 4 (1949), pp. 35 ff.
- Daniela Müller, Ketzerei und Ketzerbestrafung im Werk des Alfonso de Castro, in: Frank Grunert und Kurt Seelmann (Hrsg.), Die Ordnung der Praxis. Neue Studien zur Spanischen Spätscholastik, Tübingen 2001, S. 333 ff.
- José María Navarrete Urieta: Alfonso de Castro y la ley penal, in: Revista de la Escuela de Estudios Penitenciarios 141 (Madrid 1959), pp. 1405 ff.
- Teodoro Olarte: Alfonso de Castro (1495-1558). Su vida, su tiempo y sus ideas filosóficas-juridicas, San José, Costa Rica, 1946.
- Marcelino Rodríguez Molinero: Origen español de la ciencia del Derecho penal, Alfonso de Castro y su sistema penal, Madrid 1959.
- Domingo Savall: Fray Alfonso de Castro (1495-1558). La orientación voluntarista de su Derecho Penal in: Archivo Ibero-Americano 38 (1935), pp. 240 ff.
- Alfonso de Castro, Against All Heresies (translated by Rev. Paul M. Kimball, Camillus: Dolorosa Press, 2021).
- Enciclopedia Universal Ilustrada Europeo-Americana, Bilbao, Madrid, Barcelona 1905-30, tom. XII, p. 877.
