= Church history =

Academic discipline studying the history of Christianity

Church history or ecclesiastical history as an academic discipline studies the history of Christianity and the way the Christian Church has developed since its inception.

Henry Melvill Gwatkin defined church history as "the spiritual side of the history of civilized people ever since our Master's coming". A. M. Renwick, however, defines it as an account of the Church's success and failure in carrying out Christ's Great Commission. Renwick suggests a fourfold division of church history into missionary activity, church organization, doctrine and "the effect on human life".

Church history is often, but not always, studied from a Christian perspective. Writers from different Christian traditions will often highlight people and events particularly relevant to their own denominational history. Catholic and Orthodox writers often highlight the achievements of the ecumenical councils. In the Catholic Church, the Second Vatican Council (1963-65) called for the teaching of church history in clerical training to "take into account the mystery of the Church, according to the dogmatic constitution 'De Ecclesia' (Lumen Gentium)". Evangelical historians may instead focus on the Protestant Reformation and the Great Awakenings.

== Notable church historians ==
- Hegesippus (d. 180)
- Eusebius (d. 339)
- The Venerable Bede (d. 735)
- David Brading (d. 2024)
- Macarius Bulgakov (d. 1882)
- Henry Chadwick (d. 2015)
- Owen Chadwick (d. 2008)
- Hans Werner Debrunner (d. 1998)
- Henry Melvill Gwatkin (d. 1918)
- Woba James
- Diarmaid MacCulloch
- George Marsden
- Martin E. Marty (d. 2025)
- Daniela Müller
- Mark Noll
- Jaroslav Pelikan (d. 2006)
- Catherine Pepinster
- Philip Schaff (d. 1893)
- Carl Trueman
- Paul Woolley (d. 1984)

== See also ==
- Ecclesiastical history of the Catholic Church
- Bede's Ecclesiastical History of the English People
- Historical theology
