= Anne Grey, Baroness Hussey =

English noblewoman (c.1490–1545)

- Born: Anne Grey c. 1490; Ruthin, Denbighshire, Wales
- Died: 1545; Sleaford, Lincolnshire, England
- Buried: Peterborough Cathedral, Peterborough, England
- Spouse: John Hussey, 1st Baron Hussey of Sleaford (m. 1509)
- Father: George Grey, 2nd Earl of Kent
- Mother: Catherine Herbert

Ann Hussey, Baroness Hussey, (née Grey, c. 1490 - 1545) was an English noblewoman. She was married to John Hussey, 1st Baron Hussey of Sleaford, and served as an attendant to Mary Tudor, future Queen of England. She was a distant but direct descendant of King Edward III and his wife Philippa of Hainault.

== Early life ==
Grey was born around 1490 in Ruthin, Denbighshire, Wales.

Her father was George Grey, 2nd Earl of Kent (1454–1505), the son of Edmund Grey, 1st Earl of Kent and Katherine Percy, Countess of Kent. Edmund descended from John of Gaunt, 1st Duke of Lancaster, himself the son of King Edward III. Katherine also descended from John of Gaunt, by his third wife Katherine Swynford, as well as another of Edward III's sons, Lionel of Antwerp, Duke of Clarence.

Anne's mother was Grey's second wife, Catherine Herbert (died 1506) who was the daughter of William Herbert, 1st Earl of Pembroke, the second son of Sir William ap Thomas of Raglan, a member of the Welsh gentry; and Anne Devereux, the daughter of Sir Walter Devereux, Lord Chancellor of Ireland.

Her elder half-brother, Richard Grey, 3rd Earl of Kent (c. 1478–1524), succeeded their father when she was about 15 years old. Richard married Elizabeth Hussey, who was the sister of Grey's husband, but had no children.

== Marriage and life as Baroness Hussey ==
Grey married John Hussey, 1st Baron Hussey of Sleaford (c. 1465 – 1537) in 1509 at Sleaford, Lincolnshire. She was his second wife; he had previously been married to Margaret Barr (née Blount) and by whom he had three sons. According to historian Sir William Dugdale, in the documents written by Hussey shortly before his death in 1537, he spoke of his wife 'Anne'.

Grey's husband was a member of the House of Lords, a Chamberlain to King Henry VIII's daughter Mary, and travelled to France to take part in the Field of the Cloth of Gold meeting between Henry VIII and King Francis I of France. Grey herself was one of Mary's personal attendants and a member of her court.

Baroness Hussey was amongst a group of high ranking noblewomen who openly opposed King Henry VIII's proposed divorce from Catherine of Aragon. When Mary Tudor was declared illegitimate by Act of Parliament in 1533, King Henry forbade anyone to address his daughter with the title of Princess. However, Grey continued to do so, being "indiscreet in her support for Mary." She lost her position as Mary's attendant around June 1534 and was imprisoned in the Tower of London in August 1534. When questioned by Sir Edmund Walsingham and Sir William Petre about addressing Mary Tudor with the title of Princess, Hussey "confessed to this, admitting she had done it inadvertently, out of long habit, not from any intent to disobey the law". Grey also admitted that she had exchanged tokens, small presents that reflected their close relationship, with Mary. She was eventually pardoned.

When the Pilgrimage of Grace broke out in Lincolnshire in 1536, where Grey's husband was sheriff, he was seen to vacillate even though he had refused to join the rebels and told them to return to their home. Hussey was indicted on 12 May 1537 for conspiring against Henry VIII and raising a rebellion against the king. He pleaded not guilty but was convicted and attainted by a jury of his peers. He was executed for treason in Lincoln on 29 June 1537. His lands and titles were confiscated and his widow and children were unable to reclaim them.

Grey survived her husband by 8 years and died in 1545. She was buried at Peterborough Cathedral.

== Children ==
Grey and Baron Hussey's children included:

- Sir Giles Hussey (c. 1495/1505), Knighted by the Earl of Surrey at the Sacking of Morlaix in France in 1522, married Jane Pigot and had children
- Reginald Hussey (c. 1501), died without children
- Thomas Hussey, lawyer and MP, died without children
- Joan Hussey, married Sir Roger Forster
- Elizabeth Hussey, she married firstly Walter Hungerford, Baron Hungerford of Heytesbury as his third wife; and married secondly Sir Robert Throckmorton of Coughton, Warwickshire (d. 1586) as his second wife. She had four daughters and two sons
- Bridget Hussey (c. 1526 – 13 January 1600/1601), married first; Sir Richard Morrison of Cashiobury, Hertfordshire (d. 17 March 1556); married second Henry Manners, 2nd Earl of Rutland before 1563; and married third Francis Russell, 2nd Earl of Bedford on 25 June 1566 as his second wife, and had no children
- Anne (or Agnes) Hussey, married Sir Humphrey Browne, Justice of the Common Pleas, by whom she was the mother of Christian Browne, wife of Sir John Tufton, 1st Baronet.
- Dorothy Hussey, who married three times, the last time to Thomas Pallister, and had children
- Mary Hussey, married Humphry Dymock of Warwick
