= Adversus omnes haereses =

Adversus omnes haereses (Latin for 'Against all Heresies') may refer to:

- A work by Pseudo-Tertullian
- A lost work by Gennadius of Massilia
- A 16th-century work by the Spanish theologian Fr. Alfonso de Castro, O.F.M.

== See also ==
- The work Against Heresies by Irenaeus (Latin: Adversus Haereses)
- Panarion (also sometimes called Adversus Haereses)
- Refutatio Omnium Haeresium
