= Mary I =

Queen of England and Ireland from 1553 to 1558

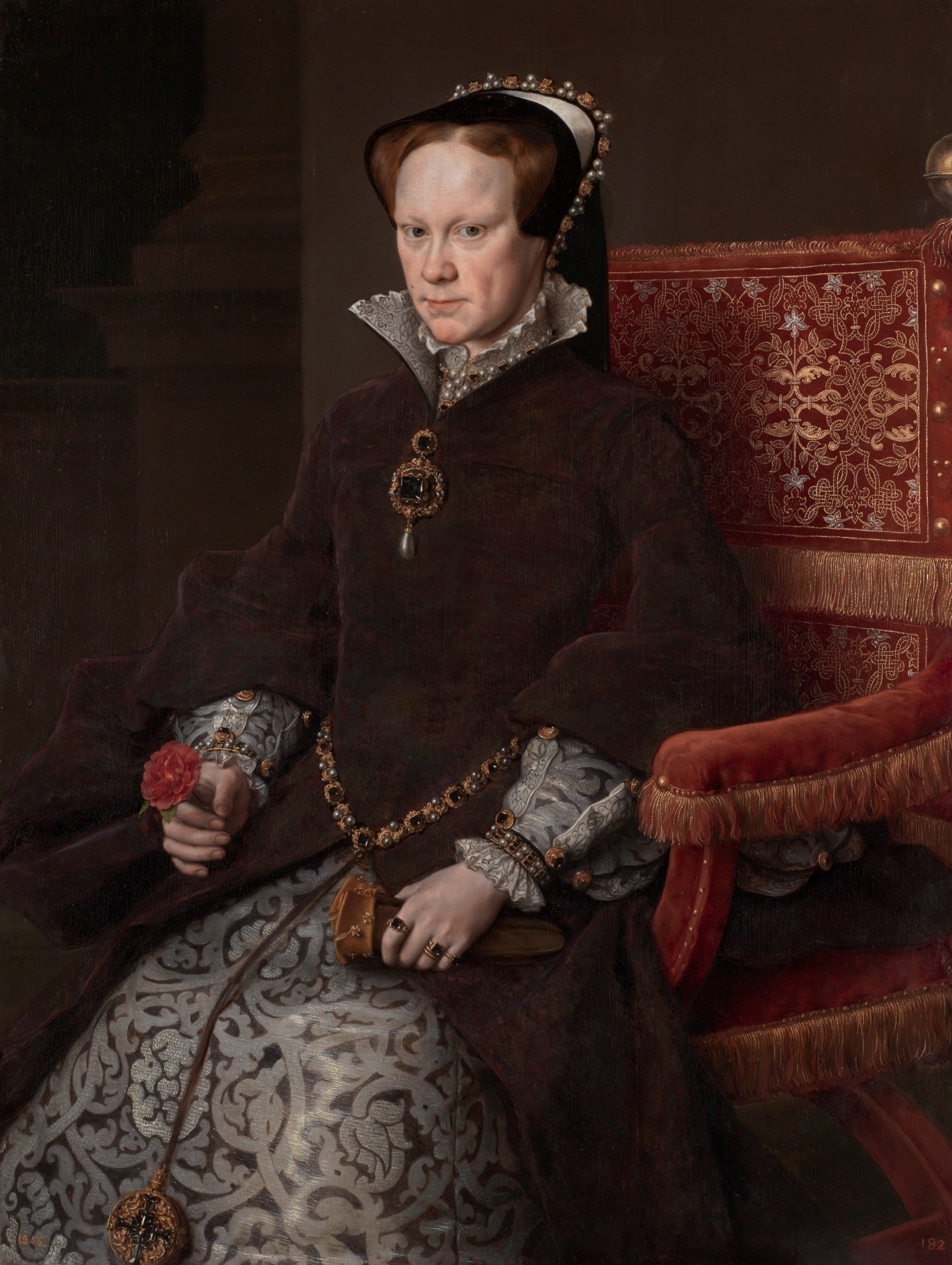
- Portrait by Antonis Mor, 1554

Queen of England and Ireland
- Reign: July 1553 (Note: Edward VI died on 6 July. Mary was proclaimed his successor in London on 19 July; sources differ on whether her regnal years were dated from 24 July or 6 July.) – 17 November 1558
- Coronation: 1 October 1553
- Predecessor: Jane (disputed) or Edward VI
- Successor: Elizabeth I
- Co-monarch: Philip (1554–1558)

Queen consort of Spain
- Tenure: 16 January 1556 – 17 November 1558
- Born: 18 February 1516; Palace of Placentia, Greenwich, England
- Died: 17 November 1558 (aged 42); St James's Palace, Westminster, England
- Burial: 14 December 1558; Westminster Abbey, London
- Spouse: Philip II of Spain (m. 1554)
- House: Tudor
- Father: Henry VIII
- Mother: Catherine of Aragon
- Religion: Catholicism

Mary I (18 February 1516 – 17 November 1558) was Queen of England and Ireland from July 1553 and Queen of Spain as the wife of King Philip II from January 1556 until her death in 1558. She made vigorous attempts to reverse the English Reformation, which had begun during the reign of her father, King Henry VIII. Her attempt to restore to the Church the property confiscated in the previous two reigns was largely thwarted by Parliament, but during her five-year reign, more than 280 religious dissenters were burned at the stake, in what became known as the Marian persecutions, leading later commentators to label her "Bloody Mary".

Mary was the only surviving child of Henry VIII by his first wife, Catherine of Aragon. She was declared illegitimate and barred from the line of succession following the annulment of her parents' marriage in 1533, but was restored via the Third Succession Act 1543. Her younger half-brother, Edward VI, succeeded their father in 1547 at the age of nine. When Edward became terminally ill in 1553, he attempted to remove Mary as heir to the throne because he supposed, correctly, that she would reverse the Protestant reforms that had taken place during his reign. Upon his death, leading politicians proclaimed their Protestant cousin, Lady Jane Grey, as queen instead. Mary speedily assembled a force in East Anglia and deposed Jane, who was later executed.

Mary was – excluding the disputed reigns of Jane and the Empress Matilda – the first queen regnant of England. In July 1554, she married Philip of Spain, becoming queen consort of Habsburg Spain on his accession in 1556. Marriage to the Spanish king was controversial in England. After Mary's death in 1558, her re-establishment of Catholicism in England was reversed by her younger half-sister and successor, Elizabeth I.

== Birth and family ==
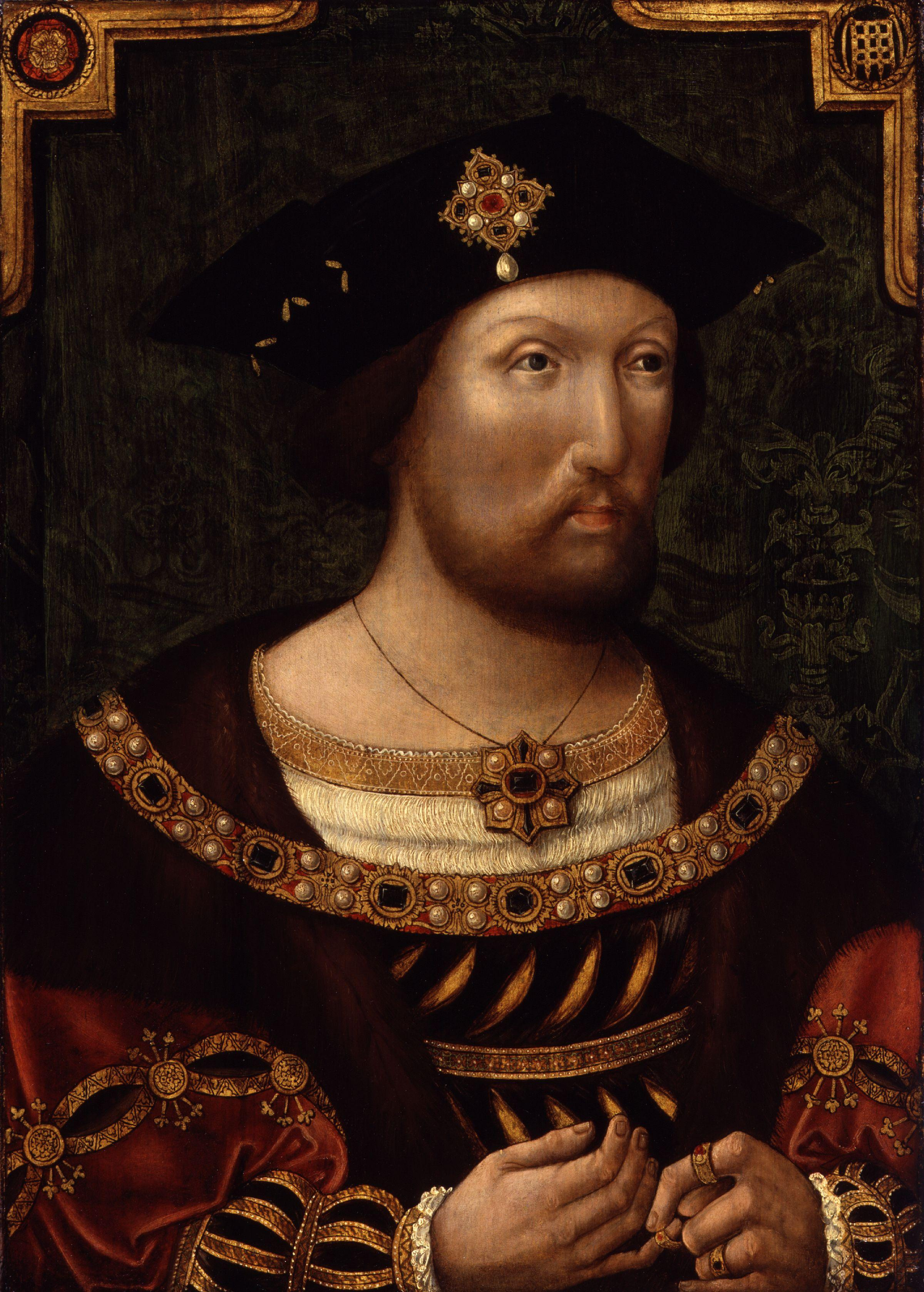
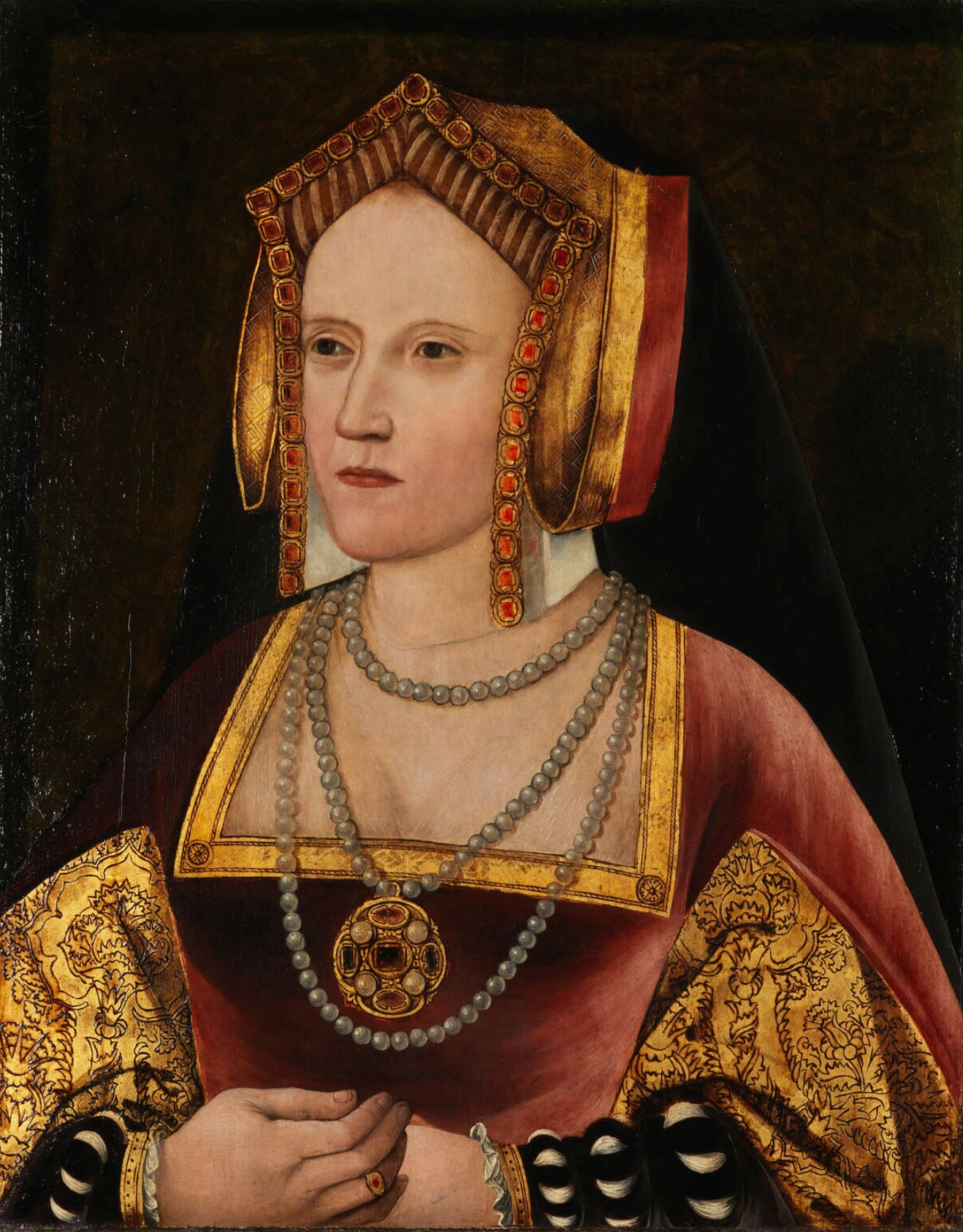
Mary's parents, Henry VIII and Catherine of Aragon, c. 1520

Mary was born on 18 February 1516 at the Palace of Placentia in Greenwich, England, the only child of King Henry VIII and his first wife, Catherine of Aragon, to survive infancy. Before Mary, her mother had three miscarriages and stillbirths and one short-lived son, Henry, Duke of Cornwall.

Mary was baptised into the Catholic faith at the Church of the Observant Friars in Greenwich three days after her birth. Her godparents included Lord Chancellor Thomas Wolsey; her great-aunt Catherine, Countess of Devon; and Agnes Howard, Duchess of Norfolk. Henry VIII's first cousin once removed, Margaret Pole, Countess of Salisbury, stood sponsor for Mary's confirmation, which was conducted immediately after the baptism. The following year, Mary became a godmother herself when she was named as one of the sponsors of her cousin Frances Brandon.

At birth, Mary was initially placed in the care of her father's own former royal governess, Elizabeth Denton. In 1520, the Countess of Salisbury was appointed Mary's governess. The Countess of Salisbury was replaced by Amy Boleyn, who was Mary's governess between 1521 and 1525, when the Countess of Salisbury was reinstated in her office as Mary's governess. Sir John Hussey (later Lord Hussey) was her chamberlain from 1530, and his wife Lady Anne, daughter of George Grey, 2nd Earl of Kent, was one of Mary's attendants.

== Childhood ==
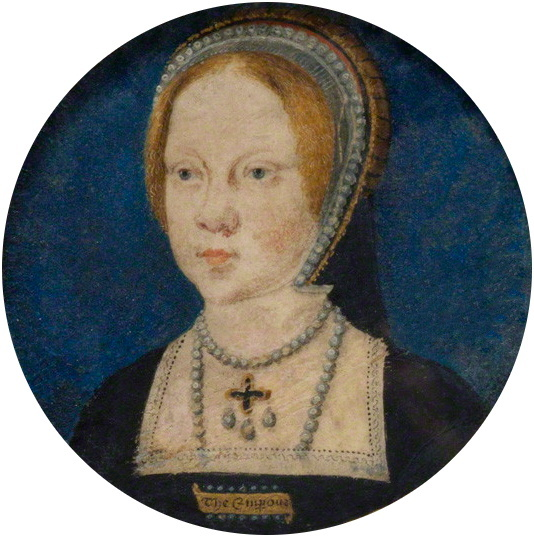
Mary in 1522, at the time of her engagement to Emperor Charles V. She is aged 6 and wears a rectangular brooch inscribed "The Emperour".

Mary was a precocious child. In July 1520, when scarcely four and a half years old, she entertained a visiting French delegation with a performance on the virginals (a type of harpsichord). A great part of her early education came from her mother, who consulted the Spanish humanist Juan Luis Vives for advice and commissioned him to write De Institutione Feminae Christianae, a treatise on the education of girls. By the age of nine, Mary could read and write Latin. She studied French, Spanish, music, dance, and perhaps Greek. Henry VIII doted on her and boasted to the Venetian ambassador Sebastian Giustinian that she never cried. Mary had a fair complexion with pale blue eyes and red or reddish-golden hair, traits very similar to those of her parents. She was ruddy-cheeked, a trait she inherited from her father.

Despite his affection for Mary, Henry was deeply disappointed that his marriage had produced no sons. By the time Mary was nine years old, it was apparent that Henry and Catherine would have no more children, leaving Henry without a legitimate male heir. In 1525, Henry sent Mary to the border of Wales to preside, presumably in name only, over the Council of Wales and the Marches. She was given her own court based at Ludlow Castle and many of the royal prerogatives normally reserved for a Prince of Wales. Vives and others called her the Princess of Wales, although she was never technically invested with the title. She appears to have spent three years in the Welsh Marches, making regular visits to her father's court, before returning permanently to the home counties around London in mid-1528.

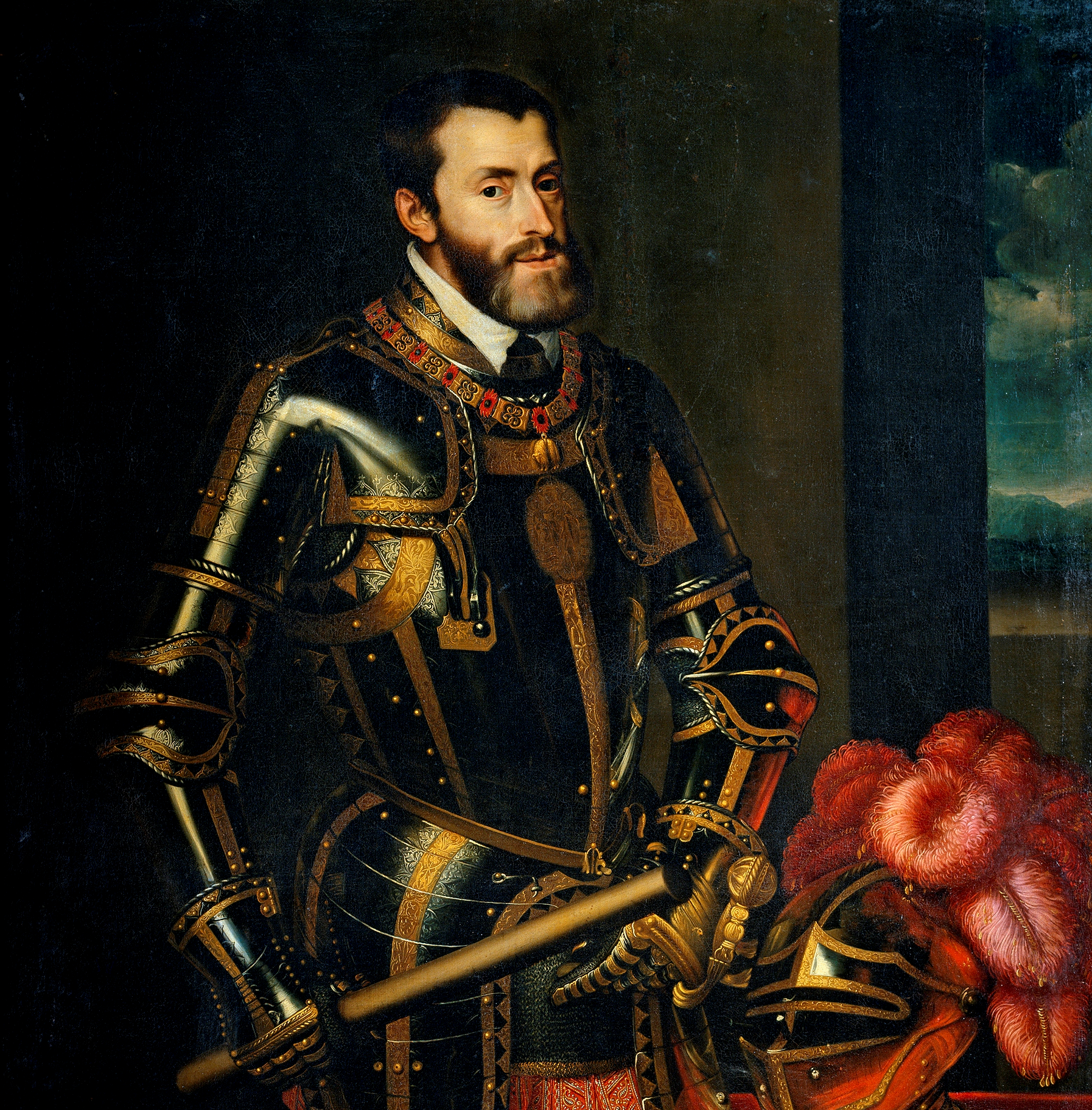
Emperor Charles V, Mary's cousin and later father-in-law

Throughout Mary's childhood, Henry negotiated potential future marriages for her. When she was two years old, Mary was promised to Francis, Dauphin of France, the infant son of King Francis I, but the contract was repudiated after three years. In 1522, at age six, she was contracted to marry her 22-year-old cousin Charles V, Holy Roman Emperor, but Charles broke off the engagement within a few years with Henry's agreement. Cardinal Wolsey, Henry's chief adviser, then resumed marriage negotiations with the French, and Henry suggested that Mary marry the French king Francis I, who was eager for an alliance with England. A marriage treaty was signed which provided that Mary marry either Francis I or his second son, Henry, Duke of Orléans, but Wolsey secured an alliance with France without the marriage.

In 1528 Wolsey's agent Thomas Magnus discussed the idea of Mary marrying her cousin King James V of Scotland with the Scottish diplomat Adam Otterburn. According to the Venetian Mario Savorgnano, by this time she was developing into a pretty, well-proportioned young lady with a fine complexion.

== Adolescence ==
Although various possibilities for Mary's marriage had been considered, the marriage of Mary's parents was itself in jeopardy, which threatened her status. Disappointed at the lack of a male heir, and eager to remarry, Henry attempted to have his marriage to Catherine annulled, but Pope Clement VII refused his request. Henry claimed, citing biblical passages (Leviticus 20:21), that the marriage was unclean because Catherine was the widow of his brother Arthur, Prince of Wales (Mary's uncle). Catherine claimed that her marriage to Arthur was never consummated and so was not a valid marriage. Pope Julius II issued a dispensation on that basis. Clement VII may have been reluctant to act because he was influenced by Charles V, Catherine's nephew and Mary's former betrothed, whose troops had sacked Rome in the War of the League of Cognac.

From 1531, Mary was often sick with irregular menstruation and depression, although it is not clear whether this was caused by stress, puberty, or a more deep-seated disease. She was not permitted to see her mother, whom Henry had sent to live away from court. In early 1533, Henry married Anne Boleyn, and in May Thomas Cranmer, the Archbishop of Canterbury, formally declared the marriage with Catherine void and the marriage to Anne valid. Henry repudiated the Pope's authority, declaring himself Supreme Head of the Church of England. Catherine was demoted to Dowager Princess of Wales (a title she would have held as Arthur's widow), and Mary was deemed illegitimate. She was styled "The Lady Mary" rather than Princess, and her place in the line of succession was transferred to Henry and Anne's newborn daughter, Elizabeth. Mary's household was dissolved; her servants (including the Countess of Salisbury) were dismissed; and, in December 1533, she was sent to join her infant half-sister's household at Hatfield Palace, Hertfordshire.

Mary determinedly refused to acknowledge that Anne was the queen or that Elizabeth was a princess, enraging King Henry. Under strain and with her movements restricted, Mary was frequently ill, which the royal physician attributed to her "ill treatment". The Imperial ambassador Eustace Chapuys became her close adviser, and interceded, unsuccessfully, on her behalf at court. The relationship between Mary and her father worsened; they did not speak to each other for three years. Although both she and her mother were ill, Mary was refused permission to visit Catherine. When Catherine died in 1536, Mary was "inconsolable". Catherine was interred in Peterborough Cathedral, while Mary grieved in semi-seclusion at Hunsdon in Hertfordshire.

== Adulthood ==
In 1536, Queen Anne fell from the King's favour and was beheaded. Elizabeth, like Mary, was declared illegitimate and stripped of her succession rights. Within two weeks of Anne's execution, Henry married Jane Seymour, who urged her husband to make peace with Mary. Henry insisted that Mary recognise him as head of the Church of England, repudiate papal authority, acknowledge that the marriage between her parents was unlawful, and accept her own illegitimacy. She attempted to reconcile with Henry by submitting to his authority as far as "God and my conscience" permitted, but was bullied into signing a document agreeing to all of Henry's demands.

Reconciled with her father, Mary resumed her place at court. Henry granted her a household, which included the reinstatement of Mary's favourite, Susan Clarencieux. Mary's Privy Purse accounts for this period, kept by Mary Finch, show that Hatfield House, the Palace of Beaulieu (also called Newhall), Richmond and Hunsdon were among her principal places of residence, as well as Henry's palaces at Greenwich, Westminster and Hampton Court. Her expenses included fine clothes and gambling at cards, one of her favourite pastimes.

Rebels in the North of England, including Lord Hussey, Mary's former chamberlain, campaigned against Henry's religious reforms, and one of their demands was that Mary be made legitimate. The rebellion, known as the Pilgrimage of Grace, was ruthlessly suppressed. Along with other rebels, Hussey was executed, but there is no suggestion that Mary was directly involved. In 1537, Queen Jane died after giving birth to a son, Edward, who as a male was heir apparent to the English throne, displacing Mary. Mary was made godmother to her half-brother and acted as chief mourner at the Queen's funeral. Yet, after King Henry's refusal to legitimize Mary or determine her place in the succession, Mary described herself in 1542 as "the unhappiest woman in all of Christendom".

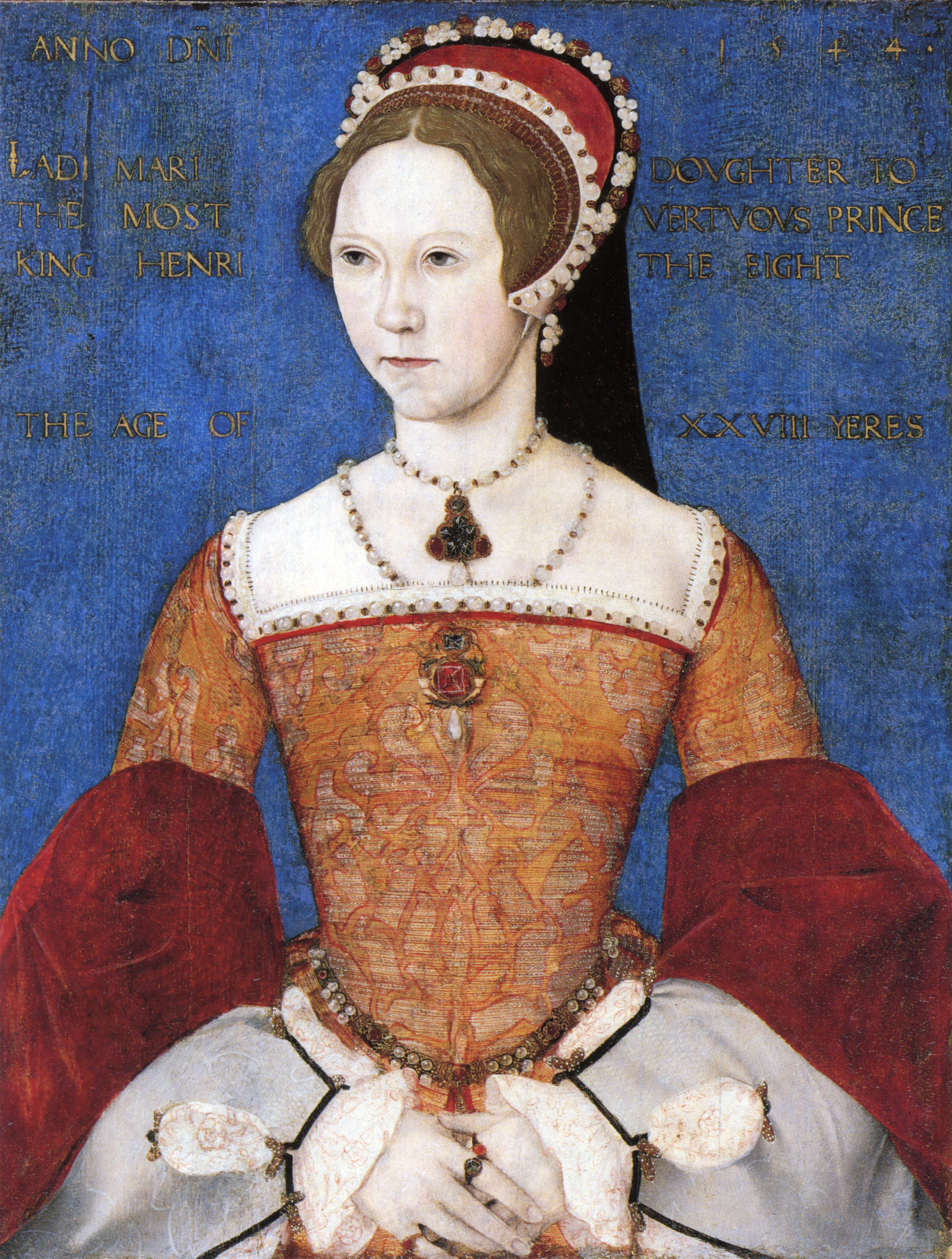
Mary in 1544

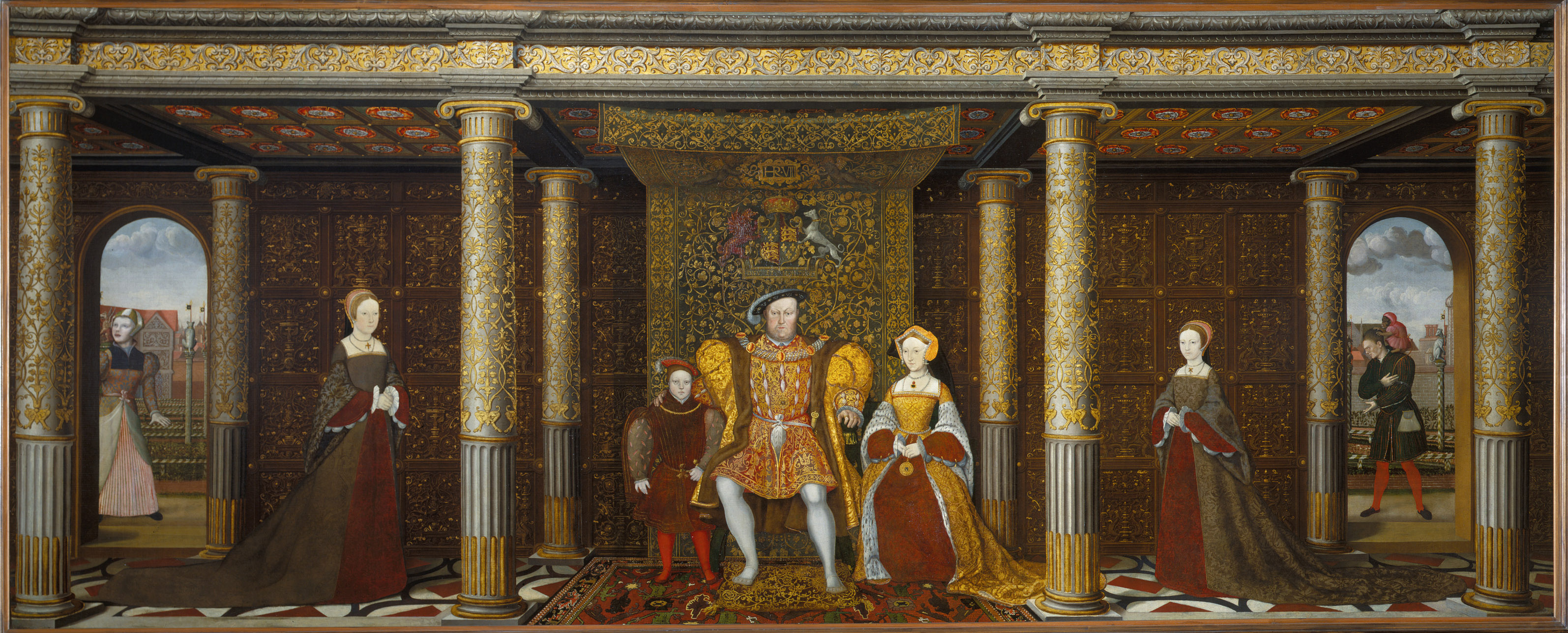
1545 painting showing left to right: 'Mother Jak', Mary, Edward, Henry VIII, Jane Seymour (posthumous), Elizabeth, Will Somers (court fool)

Mary was courted by Philip, Duke of Neuburg, from late 1539, but he was Lutheran and his suit for her hand was unsuccessful. In 1539, the King's chief minister, Thomas Cromwell, negotiated a potential alliance with the Duchy of Cleves. Suggestions that Mary marry William, Duke of Jülich-Cleves-Berg, who was the same age, came to nothing, but a match between Henry and the Duke's sister Anne was agreed. When the King saw Anne for the first time in late December 1539, a week before the scheduled wedding, he found her unattractive but was unable, for diplomatic reasons and without a suitable pretext, to cancel the marriage. Cromwell fell from favour and was arrested for treason in June 1540; one dubious charge against him was that he had plotted to marry Mary himself. Anne consented to the annulment of the marriage, which had not been consummated, and Cromwell was beheaded.

In 1541, Henry had the Countess of Salisbury, Mary's old governess and godmother, executed on the pretext of a Catholic plot in which her son Reginald Pole was implicated. Her executioner was "a wretched and blundering youth" who "literally hacked her head and shoulders to pieces". In 1542, after the execution of Henry's fifth wife, Catherine Howard, Henry invited Mary to the royal Christmas festivities. At court, while her father was between marriages and thus without a consort, Mary acted as hostess. In 1543, Henry married his sixth and last wife, Catherine Parr, who brought the family closer together. Henry returned Mary and Elizabeth to the line of succession through the Act of Succession 1544 (also known as the Third Succession Act), placing them after Edward – though both remained legally illegitimate.

Henry VIII died in 1547, and Edward succeeded him. Mary inherited estates in Norfolk, Suffolk and Essex, and was granted Hunsdon and Beaulieu as her own. Since Edward was still a child, rule passed to a regency council dominated by Protestants, who attempted to establish their faith throughout the country. For example, the Act of Uniformity 1549 prescribed Protestant rites for church services, such as the use of Cranmer's Book of Common Prayer. Mary remained faithful to Roman Catholicism and defiantly heard traditional Mass in her own chapel. She appealed to her cousin Emperor Charles V to apply diplomatic pressure demanding that she be allowed to practise her religion.

For most of Edward's reign, Mary remained on her own estates and rarely attended court. A plan between May and July 1550 to smuggle her out of England to the safety of the European mainland came to nothing. Religious differences between Mary and Edward continued. Mary attended a reunion with Edward and Elizabeth for Christmas 1550, where the 13-year-old Edward embarrassed Mary, then 34, and reduced both her and himself to tears in front of the court, by publicly reproving her for ignoring his laws regarding worship. Mary repeatedly refused Edward's demands that she abandon Catholicism, and Edward persistently refused to drop his demands.

== Accession ==
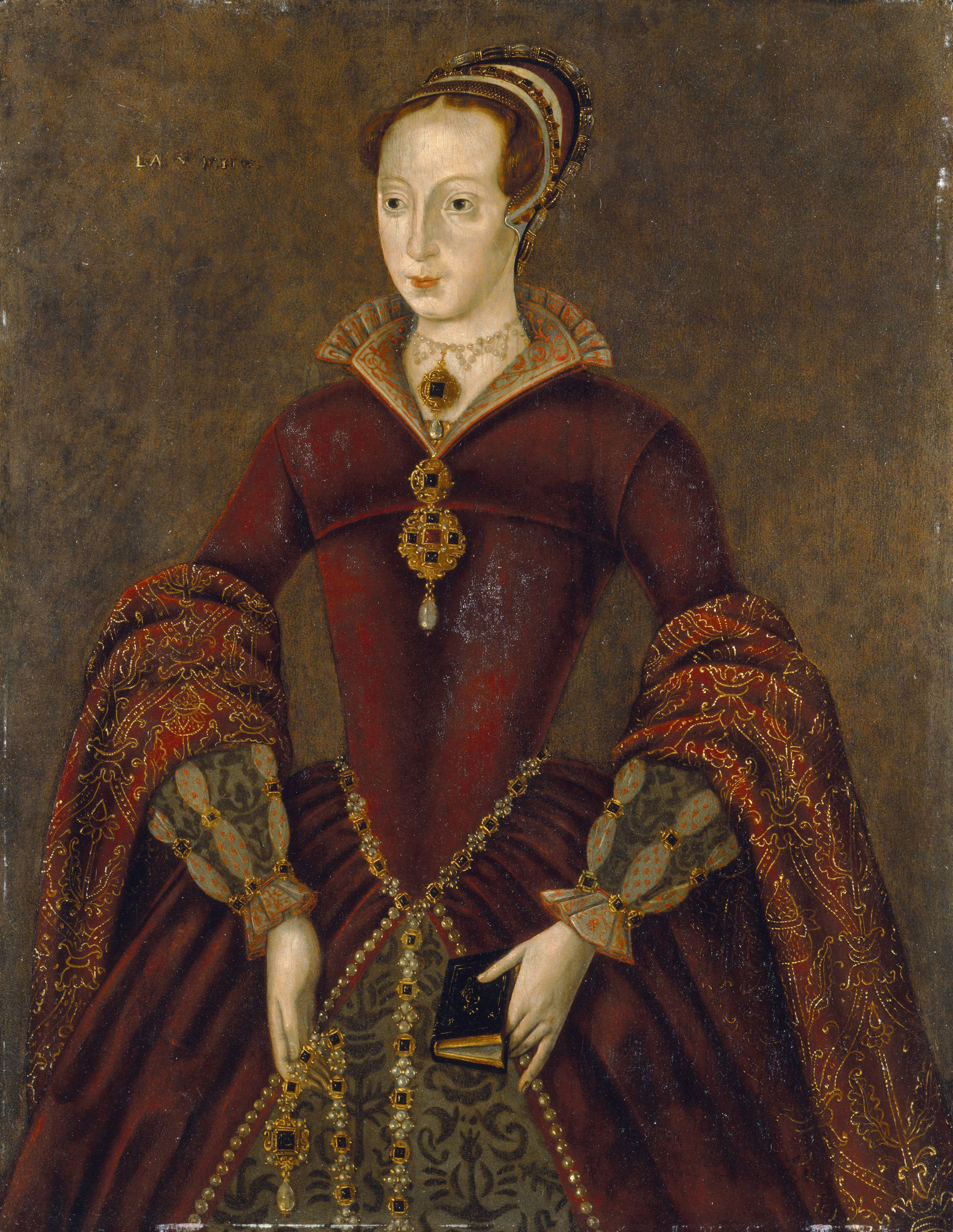
Edward VI declared his first cousin once removed, Lady Jane Grey, his heir. Lady Jane was married to Lord Guildford Dudley, a son of the English politician John Dudley, 1st Duke of Northumberland.

On 6 July 1553, at age 15, Edward VI died of a lung infection, possibly tuberculosis. He did not want the crown to go to Mary because he feared she would restore Catholicism and undo his and their father's reforms, and so he planned to exclude her from the line of succession. His advisers told him that he could not disinherit only one of his half-sisters: he would have to disinherit Elizabeth as well, even though she was a Protestant. Guided by John Dudley, 1st Duke of Northumberland, and perhaps others, Edward excluded both from the line of succession in his will.

Contradicting the Act of Succession 1544, which restored Mary and Elizabeth to the line of succession, Edward named Northumberland's daughter-in-law Lady Jane Grey, the granddaughter of Henry VIII's younger sister Mary, as his successor. Lady Jane's mother was Frances Brandon, Mary's cousin and goddaughter. Just before Edward's death, Mary was summoned to London to visit her dying brother, but was warned that the summons was a pretext on which to capture her and thereby facilitate Jane's accession to the throne. Therefore, instead of going to London from her residence at Hunsdon, Mary fled to East Anglia, where she owned extensive estates and Northumberland had ruthlessly put down Kett's Rebellion. Many adherents to the Catholic faith, opponents of Northumberland, lived there. On 9 July, from Kenninghall, Norfolk, she wrote to the privy council with orders for her proclamation as Edward's successor.

On 10 July 1553, Lady Jane was proclaimed queen by Northumberland and his supporters, and on the same day Mary's servant, Thomas Hungate, arrived in London with her letter to the council. By 12 July, Mary and her supporters had assembled a military force at Framlingham Castle, Suffolk. Northumberland's support collapsed, and Jane was deposed on 19 July. She and Northumberland were imprisoned in the Tower of London. Mary rode triumphantly into London on 3 August 1553 on a wave of popular support, accompanied by her half-sister Elizabeth and a procession of over 800 nobles and gentlemen.

== Reign ==
One of Mary's first actions as queen was to order the release of the Roman Catholic Thomas Howard, 3rd Duke of Norfolk, and Stephen Gardiner from imprisonment in the Tower of London, as well as her kinsman Edward Courtenay. Mary understood that the young Lady Jane was essentially a pawn in Northumberland's scheme, and Northumberland was the only conspirator of rank executed for high treason in the immediate aftermath of the attempted coup. Lady Jane and her husband, Lord Guildford Dudley, though found guilty, were kept under guard in the Tower rather than immediately executed, while Lady Jane's father, Henry Grey, 1st Duke of Suffolk, was released. Mary was left in a difficult position, as almost all the Privy Counsellors had been implicated in the plot to put Lady Jane on the throne. She appointed Gardiner to the council and made him both Bishop of Winchester and Lord Chancellor, offices he held until his death in November 1555. Susan Clarencieux became Mistress of the Robes. Pageants and performances were held in her honour on 30 September, with William Mundy's grand votive antiphon Vox Patris caelestis being sung while Mary processed through London. The antiphon references the Song of Songs and the Assumption of the Virgin Mary. On 1 October 1553, Gardiner crowned Mary at Westminster Abbey.

=== Spanish marriage ===
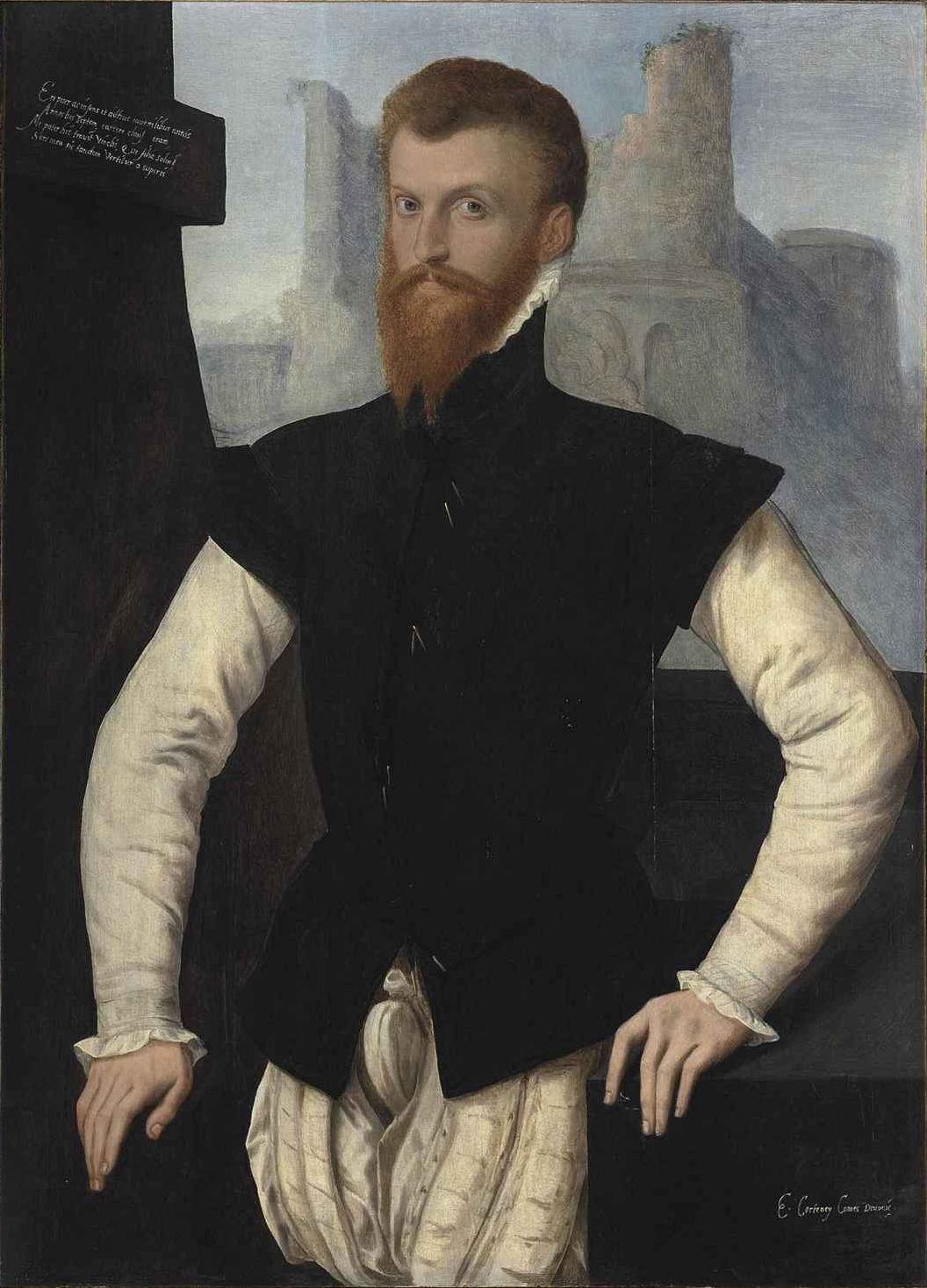
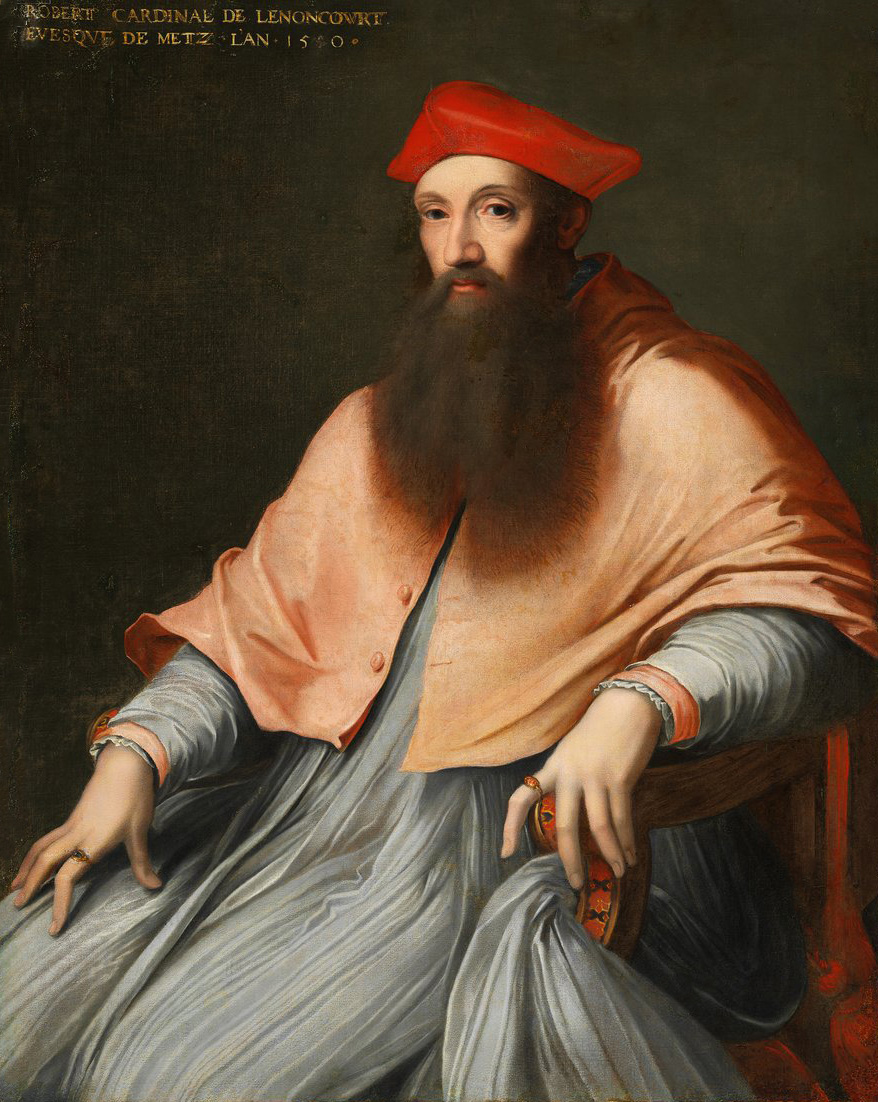
Edward Courtenay, 1st Earl of Devon and Cardinal Reginald Pole: both were potential candidates for marriage

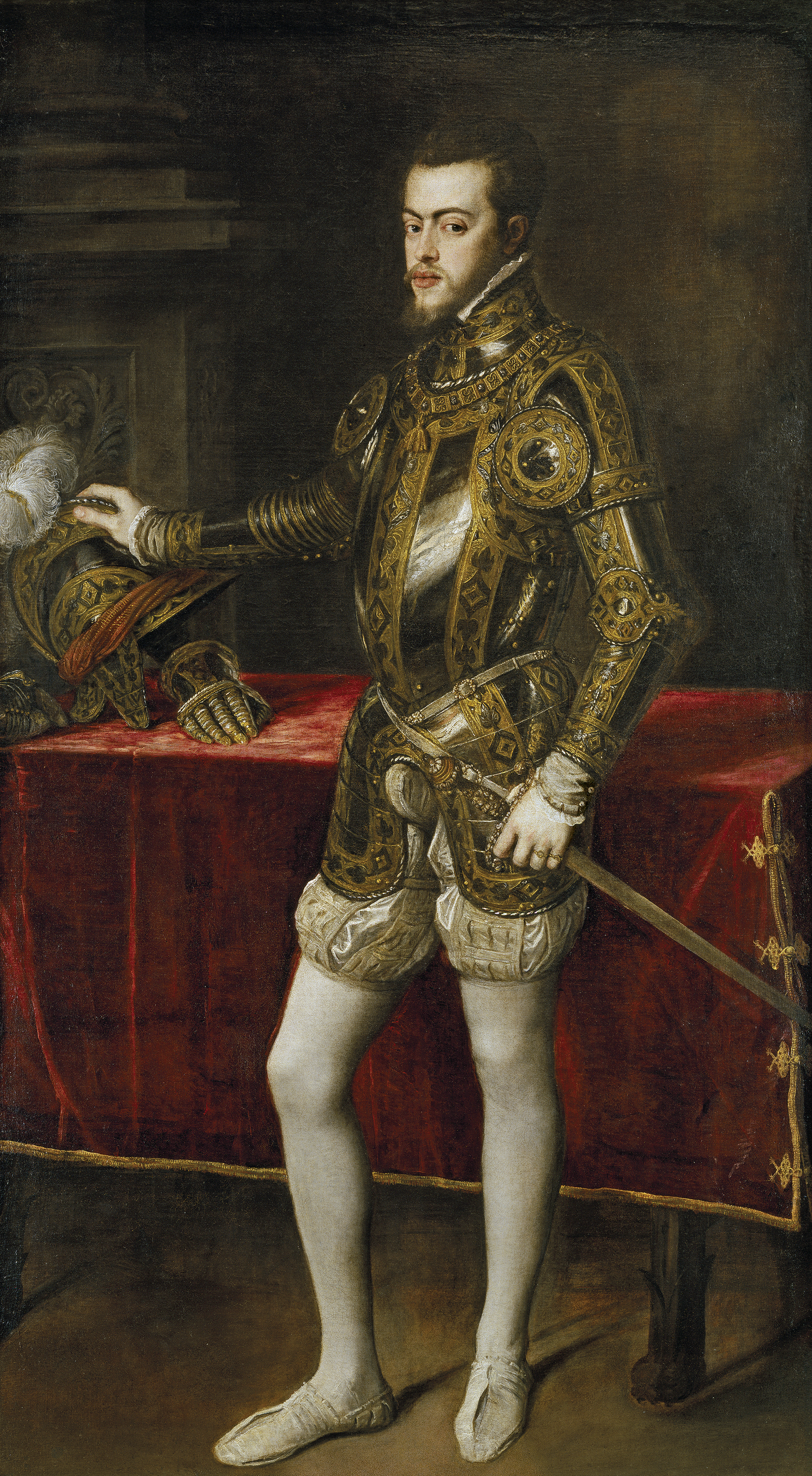
Philip of Spain by Titian

Now aged 37, Mary turned her attention to finding a husband and producing an heir, which would prevent Elizabeth (still next in line under the terms of Henry VIII's will and the Act of Succession of 1544) from succeeding to the throne. While the English expected her to marry, there was a general consensus that the Queen should not marry a foreigner, since that could lead to the interference of a foreign power in English affairs. On 16 November 1553, a parliamentary delegation went to her and formally requested that she choose an English husband, the obvious though tacit candidates being her kinsmen Edward Courtenay, recently created Earl of Devon, and the Catholic Cardinal Reginald Pole. But Mary's first cousin, Charles V, also king of Spain, saw that an alliance with England would give him supremacy in Europe; he sent his minister to England to propose his only legitimate son, Philip, as a person whom the religious and political interests of the world recommended for Mary. The Spanish prince had been widowed a few years before by the death of his first wife, Maria Manuela of Portugal, mother of his son Carlos, and was heir apparent to vast territories in Continental Europe and the New World. Both Philip and Mary were descendants of John of Gaunt. As part of the marriage negotiations, a portrait of Philip by Titian was sent to Mary in the latter half of 1553.

Mary was convinced that the safety of England required her to form a closer relationship with Charles's family, the Habsburgs, and she decided to marry Philip. A marriage treaty was presented to the Privy Council on 7 December 1553, and even though the terms clearly favoured England and included several safeguards, many still thought that England would be drawn into Philip's wars and become a mere province of the Habsburg Empire. This was of particular concern to the landed gentry and parliamentary classes, who foresaw having to pay greater taxes to cover the cost of England's participation in foreign wars.

Lord Chancellor Gardiner and the English House of Commons unsuccessfully petitioned Mary to consider marrying an Englishman, fearing that England would be relegated to a dependency of the Habsburgs. The marriage was unpopular with the English; Gardiner and his allies opposed it on the basis of patriotism, while Protestants were motivated by a fear that with the restoration of Catholicism and the arrival of the Spanish King, the Inquisition would come to judge Protestant heretics. Many English people knew the stories of the torments and cruelties suffered by the prisoners of the Inquisition, and there were even those "who had suffered from the rack of the inquisitors" themselves.

It was not just the English who were alarmed by the pending marriage of Mary and Philip. France feared an alliance between England and Spain. Antoine de Noailles, the French ambassador to England, "threatened war and began immediate intrigues with any malcontents he could find". Before Christmas in 1553, anti-Spanish ballads and broadsheets were circulating in the streets of London.

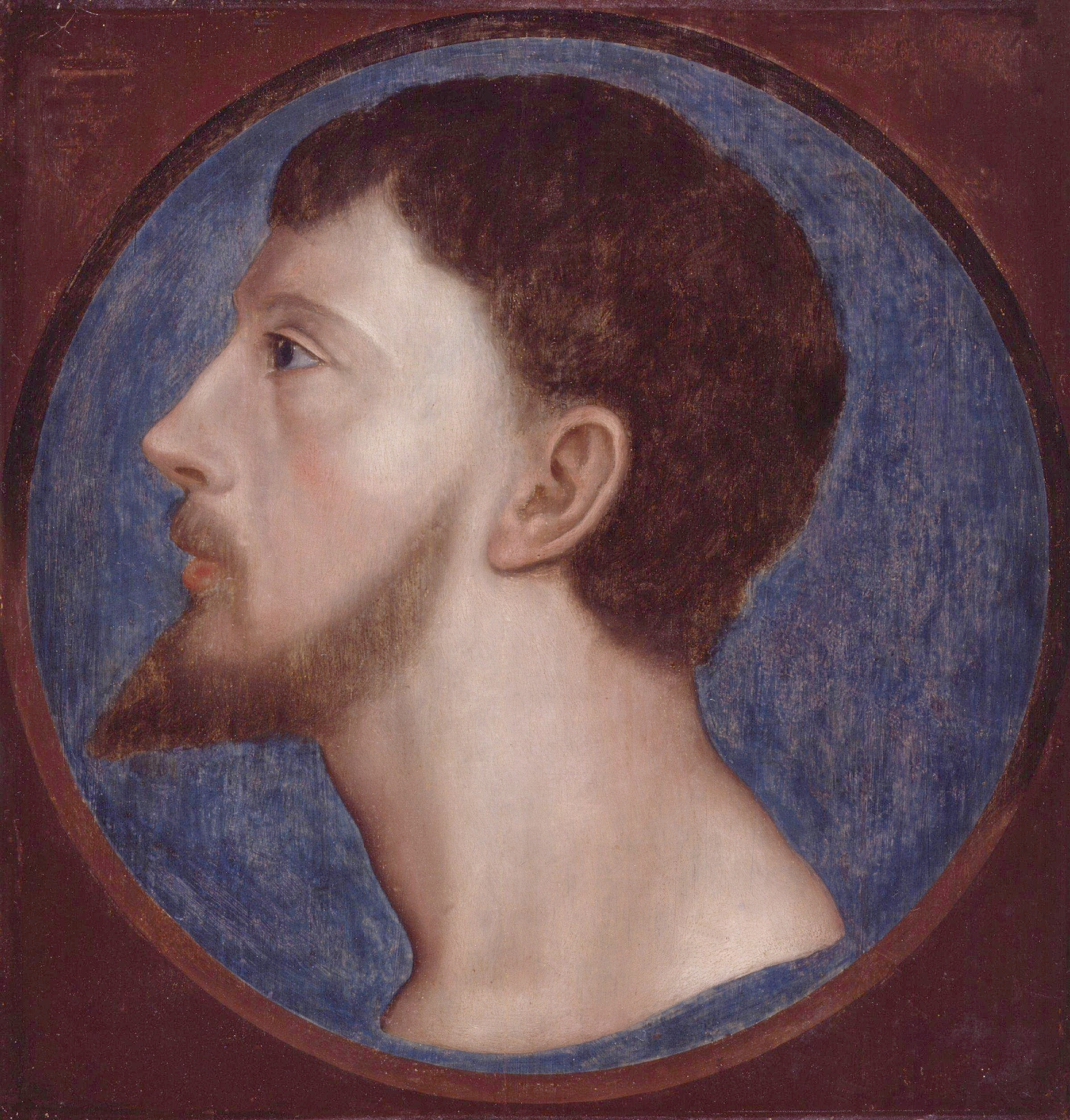
Sir Thomas Wyatt

When Mary insisted on marrying Philip, insurrections broke out. Thomas Wyatt the Younger led a force from Kent to depose Mary in favour of Elizabeth, as part of a wider conspiracy now known as Wyatt's rebellion, which also involved Henry Grey, Duke of Suffolk, Lady Jane's father. Mary declared publicly that she would summon Parliament to discuss the marriage and if Parliament decided that the marriage was not to the kingdom's advantage, she would refrain from pursuing it. Wyatt rallied about 2,500 men in Kent, and his force grew when elements of the government army under the Duke of Norfolk defected to his side. However, his delay in besieging Cooling Castle allowed Mary time to strengthen London's defences and secure the loyalty of its citizens through a speech at the Guildhall. When Wyatt advanced on the capital, Ludgate was barred against him, and his army surrendered within sight of the Tower. Wyatt was captured. Wyatt, the Duke of Suffolk, Lady Jane, and her husband Guildford Dudley were executed. Courtenay, who was implicated in the plot, was imprisoned and then exiled. Elizabeth, though protesting her innocence in the Wyatt affair, was imprisoned in the Tower of London for two months, then put under house arrest at Woodstock Palace.

Mary was – excluding the brief, disputed reigns of the Empress Matilda and Lady Jane Grey – England's first queen regnant. Further, under the English common law doctrine of jure uxoris, the property and titles belonging to a woman became her husband's upon marriage, and it was feared that any man she married would thereby become king of England in fact and name. While Mary's grandparents Ferdinand and Isabella had retained sovereignty of their respective realms during their marriage, there was no precedent to follow in England. Under the terms of Queen Mary's Marriage Act, Philip was to be styled "King of England", all official documents (including Acts of Parliament) were to be dated with both their names, and Parliament was to be called under the joint authority of the couple, for Mary's lifetime only. England was not obliged to provide military support to Philip's father in any war, and Philip could not act without his wife's consent or appoint foreigners to office in England. Philip was unhappy with these conditions but ready to agree for the sake of securing the marriage. He had no amorous feelings for Mary, but sought the marriage for political and strategic gain; his aide Ruy Gómez de Silva wrote to a correspondent in Brussels, "the marriage was concluded for no fleshly consideration, but in order to remedy the disorders of this kingdom and to preserve the Low Countries." A future child of Mary and Philip would be heir not only to the throne of England but also to the Spanish Empire in the event that Philip's eldest son, Don Carlos, died without issue.

To elevate his son to Mary's rank, Emperor Charles V ceded to Philip the crown of Naples as well as his claim to the Kingdom of Jerusalem. Mary thus became queen of Naples and titular queen of Jerusalem upon marriage. Their wedding at Winchester Cathedral on 25 July 1554 took place just two days after their first meeting. Philip did not speak English, and so they spoke a mixture of Spanish, French, and Latin.

=== False pregnancy ===
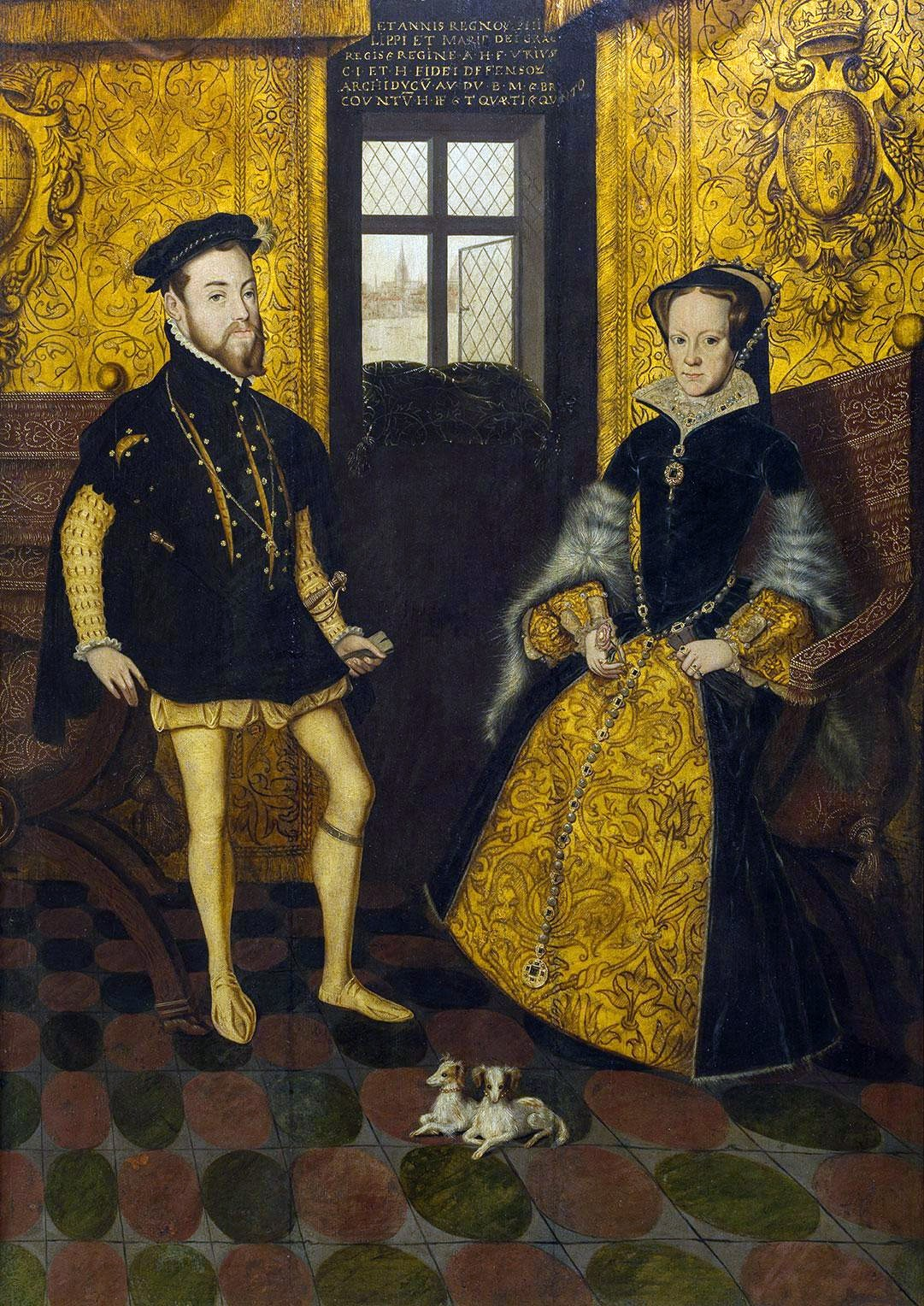
Mary and Philip, Hans Eworth

In September 1554, Mary stopped menstruating. She gained weight, and felt nauseated in the mornings. Almost the entirety of her court, including her physicians, believed she was pregnant. Parliament passed the Treason Act of 1554 making Philip regent in the event of Mary's death in childbirth. For the joint Chapel Royal and Capilla Flamenca choirs singing together in December 1554, Mary commissioned Missa Puer natus est nobis from Thomas Tallis. The festive mass setting is based on the plainchant 'A Child is born for us', which alludes to the birth of a baby boy for England. Elizabeth was released from house arrest in the last week of April 1555, and was called to court as a witness to the birth, which was expected imminently. According to Giovanni Michieli, the Venetian ambassador, Philip may have planned to marry Elizabeth if Mary died, but in a letter to his brother-in-law Maximilian of Austria, Philip expressed uncertainty as to whether Mary was pregnant. Mary's pregnancy had its pros and cons for Elizabeth: if Mary died during childbirth, Elizabeth would become the new queen, but if Mary gave birth to a healthy baby, Elizabeth's chances of becoming queen would recede sharply.

Thanksgiving services in the diocese of London were held at the end of April after false rumours that Mary had given birth to a son spread across Europe. Through May and June, the apparent delay in delivery fed gossip that Mary was not pregnant. Susan Clarencieux revealed her doubts to the French ambassador, Antoine de Noailles. Mary continued to exhibit signs of pregnancy until July 1555, when her abdomen receded. Michieli dismissively ridiculed the pregnancy as more likely to "end in wind rather than anything else". It was most likely a false pregnancy, perhaps induced by Mary's overwhelming desire to have a child. In August, soon after the disgrace of the false pregnancy, Philip left England to command his armies against France in Flanders. Mary was heartbroken and fell into a deep depression. Michieli was touched by the Queen's grief; he wrote she was "extraordinarily in love" with her husband and disconsolate at his departure.

Elizabeth remained at court until October, apparently restored to favour. In the absence of any children, Philip was concerned that one of the next claimants to the English throne after his sister-in-law was Mary, Queen of Scots, who was betrothed to Francis, Dauphin of France. Philip persuaded his wife that Elizabeth should marry his cousin Emmanuel Philibert, Duke of Savoy, to secure the Catholic succession and preserve the Habsburg interest in England, but Elizabeth refused to agree and parliamentary consent was unlikely.

=== Religious policy ===
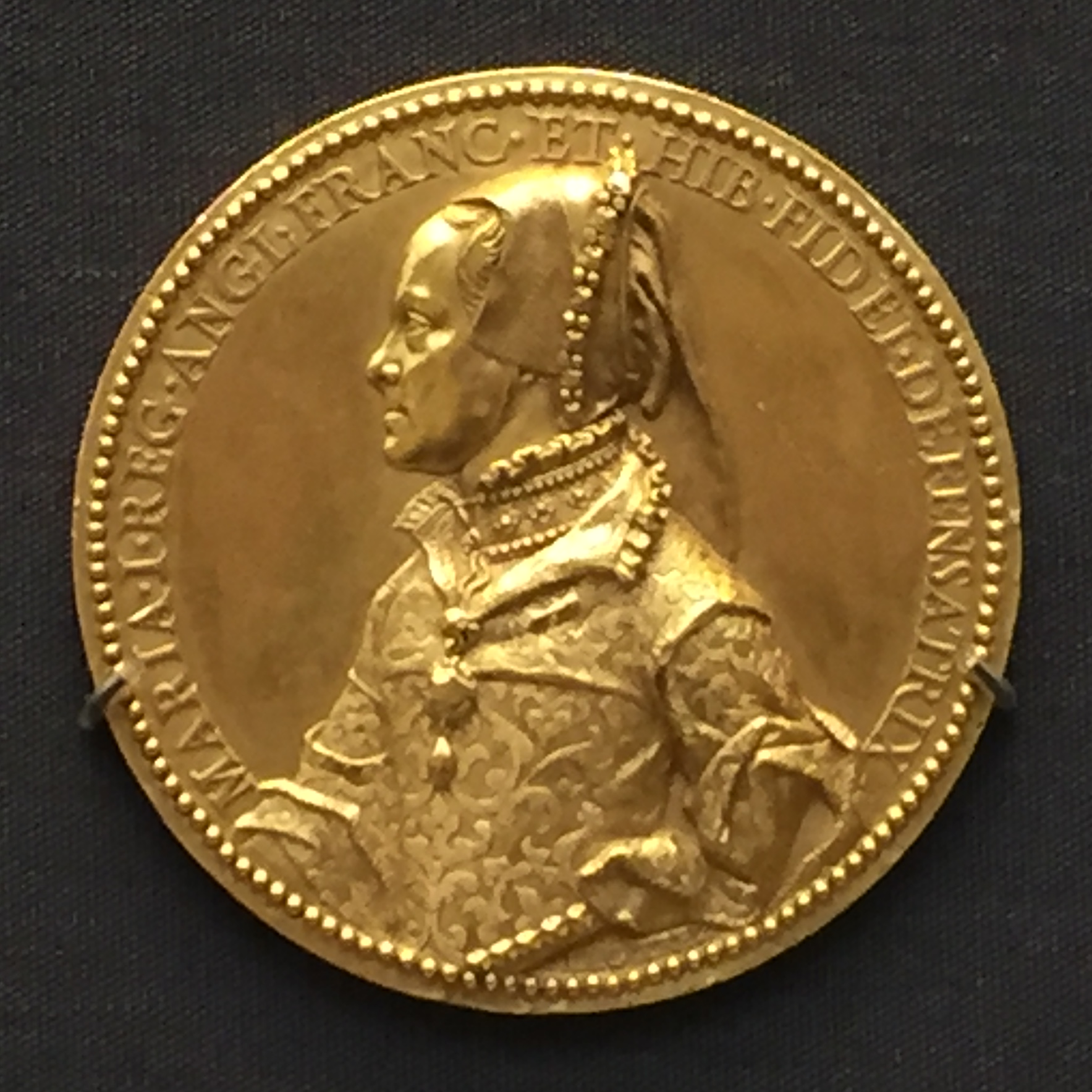
Gold medal by Jacopo da Trezzo of "Mary I, Queen of England, France and Ireland, Defender of the Faith", 1555

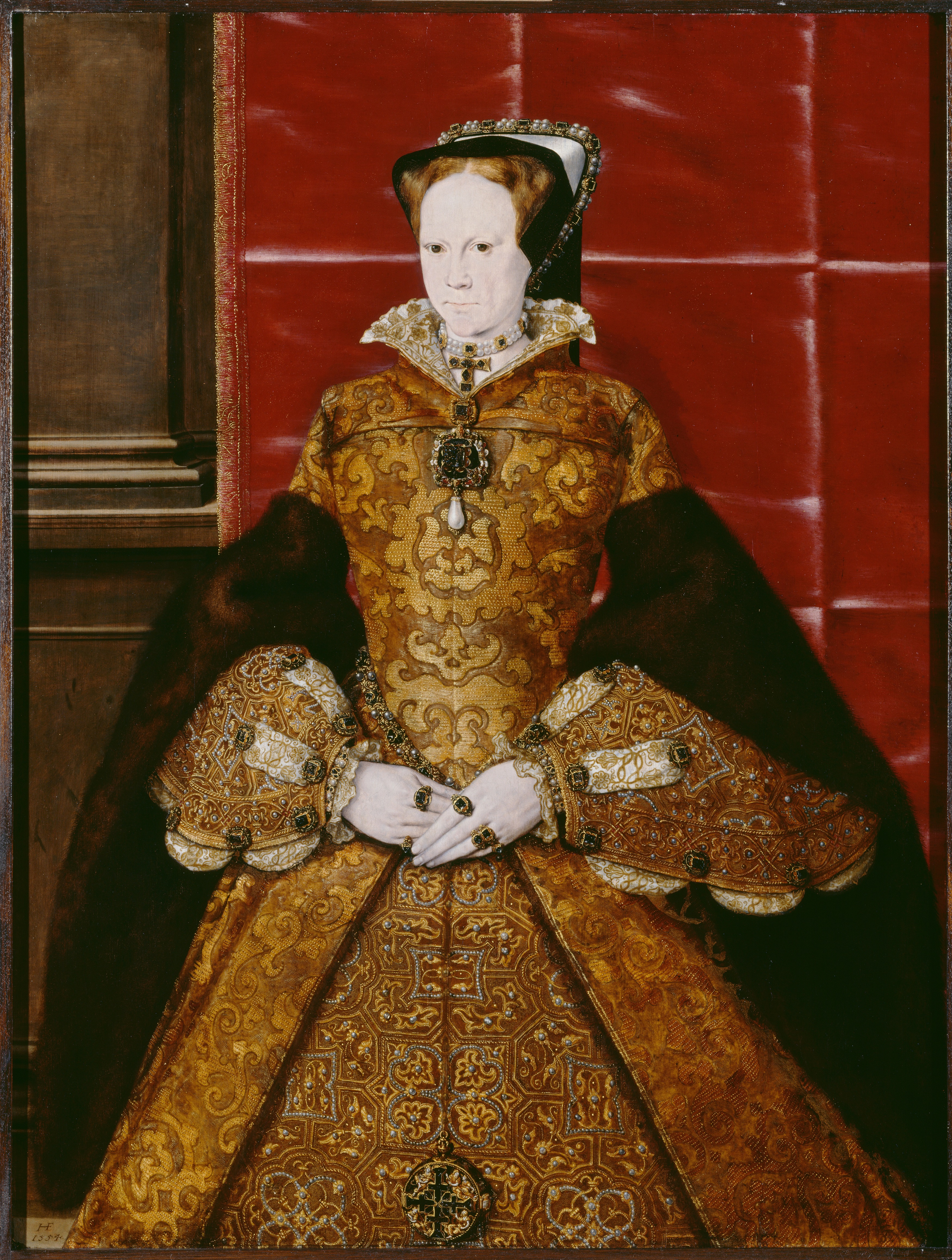
Mary by Hans Eworth, 1554. She wears a jewelled pendant bearing the Tudor pearl set beneath two diamonds.

In the month following her accession, Mary issued a proclamation that she would not compel any of her subjects to follow her religion, much like how Mary and her immediate family were allowed to observe Mass privately. By the end of September 1553, however, leading Protestant churchmen – including Thomas Cranmer, John Bradford, John Rogers, John Hooper, and Hugh Latimer – were imprisoned. Mary's first Parliament, which assembled in early October, declared her parents' marriage valid and abolished Edward's religious laws. Church doctrine was restored to the form it had taken in the 1539 Six Articles of Henry VIII, which (among other things) reaffirmed clerical celibacy. Married priests were deprived of their benefices. These initial measures taken by Mary's government not only confirmed the worst fears of the most radical Protestants, but also aroused concern among the Henrician conservatives who opposed the return of the Church of England to Roman jurisdiction. The fear of the Protestants intensified even further when Mary announced her proposed marriage to Philip of Spain, whose father, Holy Roman Emperor Charles V, was considered the most powerful sovereign in Catholic Europe.

Mary rejected the break with Rome instituted by her father and the establishment of Protestantism by her brother's regents. Philip persuaded Parliament to repeal Henry's religious laws, returning the English church to Roman jurisdiction. Reaching an agreement took many months and Mary and Pope Julius III had to make a major concession: the confiscated monastery lands were not returned to the church but remained in the hands of their influential new owners. By the end of 1554, the Pope had approved the deal, and the Heresy Acts were revived by Parliament in January 1555.

About 800 rich Protestants, including John Foxe, fled into exile. Those who stayed and persisted in publicly proclaiming their beliefs became targets of heresy laws. The first executions occurred over five days in February 1555: John Rogers on 4 February, Laurence Saunders on 8 February, and Rowland Taylor and John Hooper on 9 February. Thomas Cranmer, the imprisoned archbishop of Canterbury, was forced to watch Bishops Nicholas Ridley and Latimer being burned at the stake. He recanted, repudiated Protestant theology, and rejoined the Catholic faith. Under the normal process of the law, he should have been absolved as a repentant, but Mary refused to reprieve him. On the day of his burning, he dramatically withdrew his recantation. In total, more than 280 were executed by burning. The burnings proved so unpopular that even Alfonso de Castro, one of Philip's own ecclesiastical staff, condemned them and another adviser, Simon Renard, warned him that such "cruel enforcement" could "cause a revolt". Mary persevered with the policy, which continued for the rest of her reign and exacerbated anti-Catholic and anti-Spanish feeling among the English people. The victims became lauded as martyrs.

Reginald Pole, the son of Mary's executed governess, arrived as papal legate in November 1554. He was ordained a priest and appointed Archbishop of Canterbury immediately after Cranmer's execution in March 1556. (Note: Although he was in deacon's orders and prominent in the church, Pole was not ordained until the day before his consecration as archbishop.) While in his position, he appointed several Spanish clerics and religious advisors to non-state positions of religious importance. Juan de Villagarcía was appointed to a divinity chair at Oxford, where he claimed a good deal of credit in obtaining Cranmer's later recantations. A Friar Observant, Alfonso de Castro, the Bishop of Cuenica, advocated for greater efforts in restoring Catholicism. In 1556 he called for greater persecution of heretics.

As long as the Queen remained childless, her half-sister Elizabeth was her successor. Mary, concerned about her sister's Protestant convictions (Elizabeth attended mass only under obligation and had superficially converted to Catholicism only to save her life after being imprisoned following Wyatt's rebellion), seriously considered removing her from the succession and naming as her successor her first cousin and devout Catholic, Margaret Douglas, Countess of Lennox. However, in order for her cousin to become the new heir to the throne, Mary had to ask Parliament to remove or change the terms of the Act of Succession of 1544 and Henry VIII's will, which stipulated that Elizabeth was next in line after her sister, and that after her, the next in line were the Greys, descendants of Mary's aunt, Mary Tudor, Dowager Queen of France and Duchess of Suffolk. Mary encountered resistance from Parliament, whose members, even those who were Catholics, were reluctant to alter the succession. Furthermore, Elizabeth was highly favoured among those members who were unhappy with the joint rule of Mary and Philip.

=== Foreign policy ===
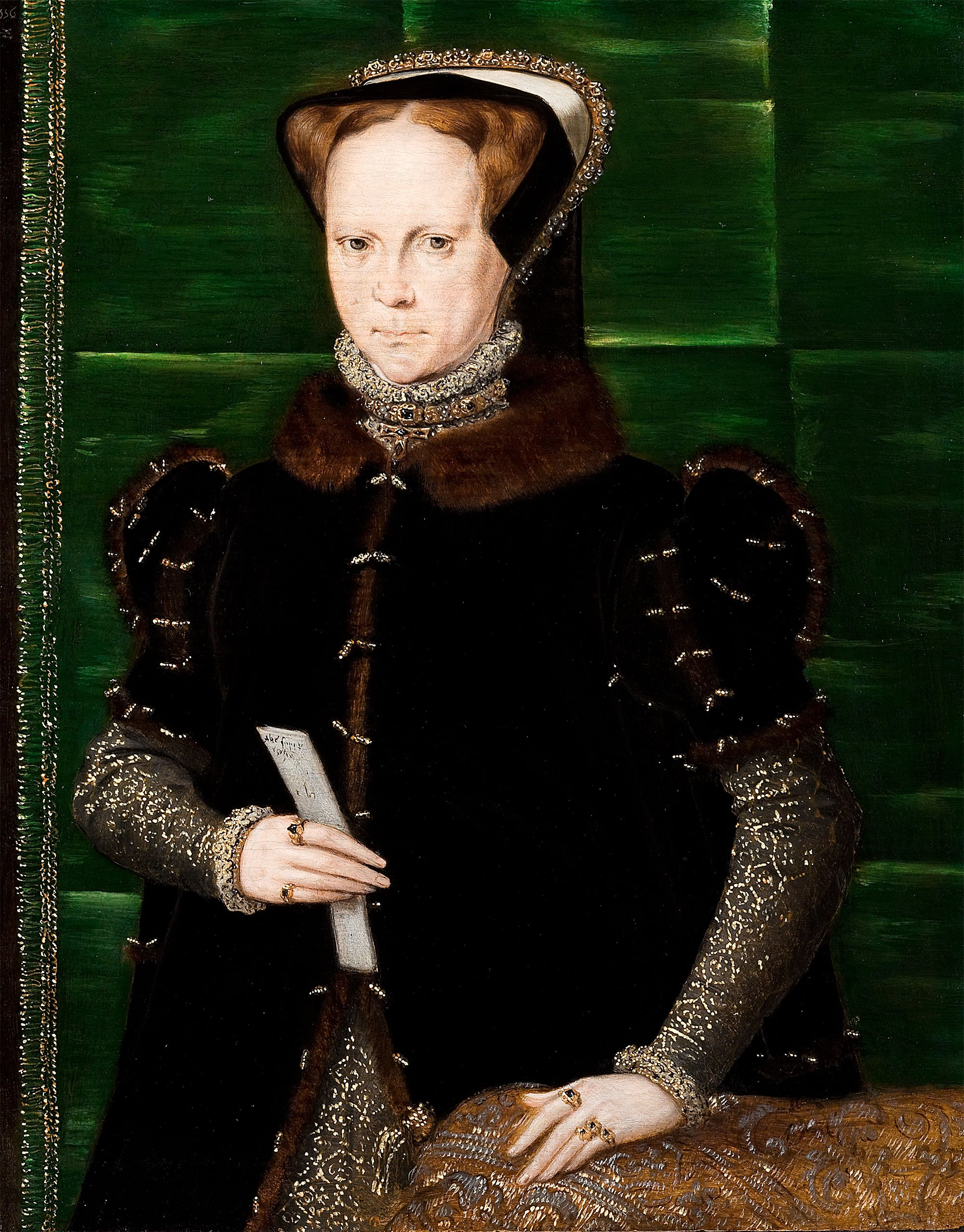
Portrait by Hans Eworth (c. 1555–1558)

Furthering the Tudor conquest of Ireland, English colonists were settled in the Irish Midlands under Mary and Philip's reign. Queen's and King's Counties (later called Counties Laois and Offaly) were founded, and their plantation began. Their principal towns were named, respectively, Maryborough (later called Portlaoise) and Philipstown (later Daingean).

In January 1556, Mary's father-in-law the Emperor abdicated. Mary and Philip were still apart; he was declared king of Spain in Brussels, but she stayed in England. Philip negotiated an unsteady truce with the French in February 1556. The next month, the French ambassador in England, Antoine de Noailles, was implicated in a plot against Mary when Henry Dudley, a second cousin of the executed Duke of Northumberland, attempted to assemble an invasion force in France. The plot, known as the Dudley conspiracy, was betrayed, and the conspirators in England were rounded up. Dudley remained in exile in France, and Noailles prudently left England.

Philip returned to England from March to July 1557 to persuade Mary to support Spain in a renewed war against France. Mary was in favour of declaring war, but her councillors opposed it because French trade would be jeopardised, it contravened the foreign war provisions of the marriage treaty, and a bad economic legacy from Edward VI's reign and a series of poor harvests meant England lacked supplies and finances. War was only declared in June 1557 after Reginald Pole's nephew Thomas Stafford invaded England and seized Scarborough Castle with French help, in a failed attempt to depose Mary. As a result of the war, relations between England and the Papacy became strained, since Pope Paul IV was allied with Henry II of France. In August, English forces were victorious in the aftermath of the Battle of Saint Quentin, with one eyewitness reporting, "Both sides fought most choicely, and the English best of all." Celebrations were brief, as in January 1558 French forces took Calais, England's sole remaining possession on the European mainland. Although the territory was financially burdensome, its loss was a mortifying blow to the Queen's prestige. According to Holinshed's Chronicles, Mary later lamented (although this may be apocryphal), "When I am dead and opened, you shall find 'Calais' lying in my heart".

=== Commerce and revenue ===
The weather during the years of Mary's reign was consistently wet. The persistent rain and flooding led to famine. Another problem was the decline of the Antwerp cloth trade. Despite Mary's marriage to Philip, England did not benefit from Spain's enormously lucrative trade with the New World. The Spanish guarded their trade routes jealously, and Mary could not condone English smuggling or piracy against her husband's subjects. In an attempt to increase trade and rescue the English economy, Mary's counsellors continued Northumberland's policy of seeking out new commercial opportunities. She granted a royal charter to the Muscovy Company under governor Sebastian Cabot, and commissioned a world atlas from Diogo Homem. Adventurers such as John Lok and William Towerson sailed south in an attempt to develop links with the coast of Africa.

Financially, Mary's regime tried to reconcile a modern form of government – with correspondingly higher spending – with a medieval system of collecting taxation and dues. Mary retained the Edwardian appointee William Paulet, 1st Marquess of Winchester, as Lord High Treasurer and assigned him to oversee the revenue collection system. A failure to apply new tariffs to new forms of imports meant that a key source of revenue was neglected. To solve this, Mary's government published a revised "Book of Rates" (1558), which listed the tariffs and duties for every import. This publication was not extensively reviewed until 1604.

English coinage was debased under both Henry VIII and Edward VI. Mary drafted plans for currency reform but they were not implemented until after her death.

== Death ==
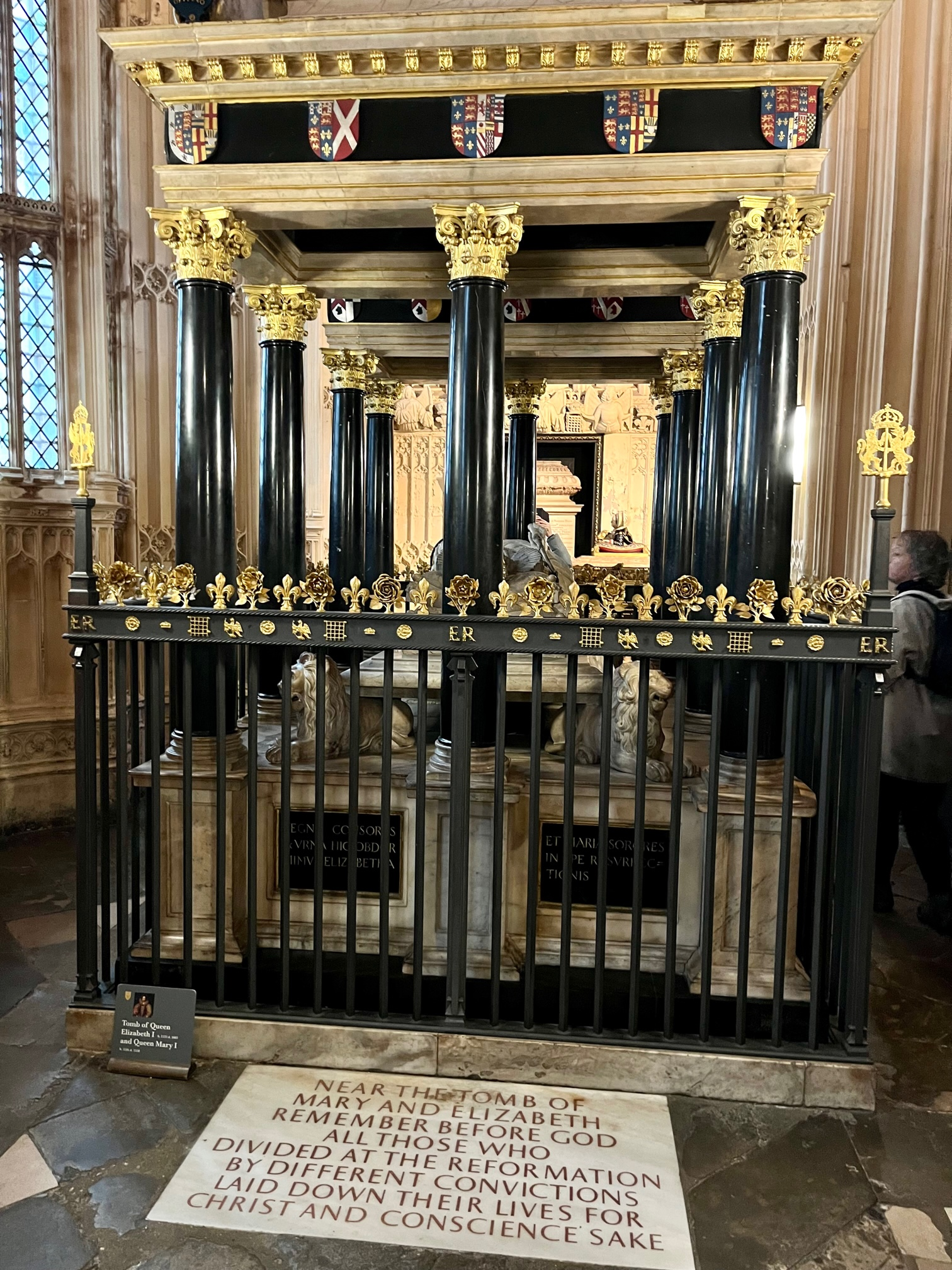
Tomb of Elizabeth I and Mary I in Westminster Abbey

After Philip's visit in 1557, Mary again thought she was pregnant, with a baby due in March 1558. She decreed in her will that her husband would be the regent during their child's minority. But no child was born, and Mary was forced to accept that Elizabeth would be her lawful successor.

Mary became weak and ill beginning in May 1558. In pain, possibly from ovarian cysts or uterine cancer, she died on 17 November 1558, aged 42, at St James's Palace, during an influenza epidemic that also claimed Archbishop Pole's life later that day. She was succeeded by her half-sister Elizabeth I. Philip, who was in Brussels, wrote to his sister Joanna: "I felt a reasonable regret for her death."

Mary's funeral was held on 13 December. Although Mary's will stated that she wished to be buried next to her mother, she was interred in Westminster Abbey on 14 December in a tomb she eventually shared with Elizabeth. The inscription on their tomb, affixed there by James I when he succeeded Elizabeth, is Regno consortes et urna, hic obdormimus Elizabetha et Maria sorores, in spe resurrectionis ("Consorts in realm and tomb, we sisters Elizabeth and Mary here lie down to sleep in hope of the resurrection").

== Legacy ==
John White, Bishop of Winchester, praised Mary at her funeral service: "She was a king's daughter; she was a king's sister; she was a king's wife. She was a queen, and by the same title a king also." She was the first woman to successfully claim the throne of England, despite competing claims and determined opposition, and enjoyed popular support and sympathy during the earliest parts of her reign, especially from the Roman Catholics of England.

Protestant writers at the time, and since, have often condemned Mary's reign. By the 17th century, the memory of her religious persecutions had led to the adoption of her sobriquet "Bloody Mary". John Knox attacked Mary in his First Blast of the Trumpet against the Monstrous Regiment of Women (1558), and John Foxe vilified her prominently in Actes and Monuments (1563). Foxe's book remained popular throughout the following centuries and helped shape enduring perceptions of Mary as a bloodthirsty tyrant. Historian Lucy Wooding notes misogynistic undertones in descriptions of Mary. "She's simultaneously being lambasted for being 'vindictive and fierce' and 'spineless and weak', criticized for such actions as showing clemency to political prisoners and yielding authority to her husband."

Mary is remembered in the 21st century for her vigorous efforts to restore the primacy of Roman Catholicism in England after the rise of Protestant influence during the previous reigns. Protestant historians have long deplored her reign, emphasizing that in just five years, several hundred Protestants were burned at the stake. In the mid-20th century, H. F. M. Prescott attempted to redress the tradition that Mary was intolerant and authoritarian, and scholarship since then has tended to view the older, simpler assessments of Mary with increasing reservations. A historiographical revisionism since the 1980s has improved her reputation among scholars to some degree. Christopher Haigh argues that her revival of religious festivities and Catholic practices was generally welcomed. He concludes that the "last years of Mary's reign were not a gruesome preparation for Protestant victory, but a continuing consolidation of Catholic strength." English Catholics often remembered Mary favourably; decades after her death, the epitaph for John Throckmorton refers to "Queene Marie [Mary I] of happie memorie". It has been hypothesised that the oeuvre of particularly sombre Lamentations settings from composers such as Thomas Tallis, William Byrd, Robert White and Osbert Parsley was produced out of Catholic nostalgia for the reign of Mary.

Catholic historians such as John Lingard thought Mary's policies failed not because they were wrong but because she had too short a reign to establish them and because of natural disasters beyond her control. In other countries, the Catholic Counter-Reformation was spearheaded by Jesuit missionaries, but Mary's chief religious advisor, Cardinal Reginald Pole, refused to allow Jesuits into England. Her marriage to Philip was unpopular among her subjects and her religious policies resulted in deep-seated resentment. The military loss of Calais to France was a bitter humiliation to English pride. Failed harvests increased public discontent. Philip spent most of his time abroad, while Mary remained in England, leaving her depressed at his absence and undermined by their inability to have children. After her death, Philip sought to marry Elizabeth, but she refused him. Although Mary's rule was ultimately ineffectual and unpopular, the policies of fiscal reform, naval expansion, and colonial exploration later lauded as Elizabethan accomplishments were started in Mary's reign.

== Titles, style, and arms ==
Arms of Mary I, impaled with those of her husband, Philip II of Spain

When Mary ascended the throne, she was proclaimed under the same official style as Henry VIII and Edward VI: "Mary, by the Grace of God, Queen of England, France and Ireland, Defender of the Faith, and of the Church of England and of Ireland on Earth Supreme Head". The title Supreme Head of the Church was repugnant to Mary's Catholicism, and she omitted it after Christmas 1553.

Under Mary's marriage treaty with Philip, the official joint style reflected not only Mary's but also Philip's dominions and claims: "Philip and Mary, by the grace of God, King and Queen of England, France, Naples, Jerusalem, and Ireland, Defenders of the Faith, Princes of Spain and Sicily, Archdukes of Austria, Dukes of Milan, Burgundy and Brabant, Counts of Habsburg, Flanders and Tyrol". This style, which had been in use since 1554, was replaced when Philip inherited the Spanish Crown in 1556 with "Philip and Mary, by the Grace of God King and Queen of England, Spain, France, both the Sicilies, Jerusalem and Ireland, Defenders of the Faith, Archdukes of Austria, Dukes of Burgundy, Milan and Brabant, Counts of Habsburg, Flanders and Tyrol".

Mary I's coat of arms was the same as those used by all her predecessors since Henry IV: Quarterly, Azure three fleurs-de-lys Or [for France] and Gules three lions passant guardant in pale Or (for England). Sometimes, her arms were impaled (depicted side-by-side) with those of her husband. She adopted "Truth, the Daughter of Time" (Latin: Veritas Temporis Filia) as her personal motto.

== Family tree ==
Ancestors of Mary I

8. Edmund Tudor, 1st Earl of Richmond
4. Henry VII of England
9. Lady Margaret Beaufort
2. Henry VIII of England
10. Edward IV of England
5. Elizabeth of York
11. Elizabeth Woodville
1. Mary I of England
12. John II of Aragon
6. Ferdinand II of Aragon
13. Juana Enríquez
3. Catherine of Aragon
14. John II of Castile
7. Isabella I of Castile
15. Isabella of Portugal

Both Mary and Philip were descended from John of Gaunt, the Duke of Lancaster, a relationship that was used to portray Philip as an English king.

Family of Mary I

John of Gaunt, Duke of Lancaster
Henry IV of England	John Beaufort, Earl of Somerset	Joan Beaufort
Henry III of Castile	Catherine of Lancaster	Henry V of England	John Beaufort, Duke of Somerset	Cecily Neville
John II of Castile	Henry VI of England	Lady Margaret Beaufort	Edward IV of England
Isabella I of Castile	Ferdinand II of Aragon	Henry VII of England	Elizabeth of York
Joanna of Castile	Maria of Aragon	Catherine of Aragon	Henry VIII of England	Margaret Tudor	Mary Tudor
Charles V, Holy Roman Emperor	Isabella of Portugal	James V of Scotland	Lady Frances Brandon
Philip II of Spain	Mary I of England	Elizabeth I of England	Edward VI of England	Mary, Queen of Scots	Lady Jane Grey

== See also ==
- Jewels of Mary I
- Tudor period

== Notes ==
Mary I Tudor dynasty Born: 18 February 1516 Died: 17 November 1558
Regnal titles
Preceded by Edward VI or Jane	Queen of England and Ireland; 1553–1558 with Philip (1554–1558)	Succeeded by Elizabeth I
Royal titles
Vacant Title last held by Isabella of Portugal	Queen consort of Naples; Duchess consort of Milan; 1554–1558	Vacant Title next held by Elisabeth of France
Vacant Title last held by Isabella of Portugal	Queen consort of Spain, Sardinia and Sicily; Duchess consort of Burgundy; 1556–1558	Vacant Title next held by Elisabeth of France
