= Daniela Müller =

German theologian and historian

- Born: July 10, 1957 (age 69); Aschaffenburg, Germany
- Occupation: University professor
- Title: Full Professor

Academic work
- Discipline: Historian of Christianity
- Sub-discipline: Church history, Canon Law
- Institutions: Radboud University
- Main interests: Catharism, Heresy, Inquisition
- Notable works: Ketzer und Kirche (2014); Frauen und Häresie (2015)

Daniela Müller (born July 10, 1957) is a German theologian and church historian. She is a full professor in the History of Christianity and Canon Law at Radboud University, and has published extensively on the subjects of heresy and dissidents. Her work focuses on "the concepts of orthodoxy and heterodoxy and on the history of dissident communities."

== Biography ==
Müller studied German, History and Catholic Theology in Würzburg. Subsequently, she pursued a doctorate on the ecclesiology of the Albigensians. In 1996 followed her habilitation on these subjects, with a venia legendi for history of canon law.

From 1998 onward, she was a visiting professor Canon Law at the University of Münster. She then moved to a university in the Netherlands when in 2001 she took up the chair for Church History at the Catholic University of Utrecht. In 2009, she became a professor in the history of christianity at the Faculty of Philosophy, Theology and Religious Studies at Radboud University.

== Research ==
Her research interests are heresy and the interweaving of canon law and theology. The point of departure of her research is the connection between historical, theological and legal aspects.

The focus is on the interaction of the competing models of interpretation within Christianity, whereby orthodoxy and heterodoxy are not regarded as contrary, but as a continuing process of the development of learning within Christianity. The disputes concerning the different interpretations of the teachings are the driving force of the development of the spiritual culture of Europe, long before the Enlightenment.

== Selected bibliography ==
- Frauen vor der Inquisition. Lebensform, Glaubenszeugnis und Aburteilung der deutschen und französischen Katharerinnen. (Veröffentlichungen des Instituts für Europäische Geschichte Mainz, Abt. Abendländische Religionsgeschichte, ed. Von G. MAY, Bd. 166), Mainz 1996. ISBN 3805318316
- Ketzer und Ketzerverfolgung, in: Lexikon zur Geschichte der Hexenverfolgung, eds. von G.Gersmann/K. Moeller/J.-M. Schmitt
- Schuld und Sünde, Sühne und Strafe. Strafvorstellungen der mittelalterlichen Kirche und ihre rechtlichen Konsequenzen (Schriftenreihe des Zentrums für rechtswissenschaftliche Grundlagenforschung Würzburg 1), Baden-Baden 2009. ISBN 3832941843
- Gott und seine zwei Frauen. Der Teufel bei den Katharern, In: Interdisziplinäre Hexenforschung online 3, 2011: Teuflische Beziehungen - teuflische Gestalten. Der dämonische Kontrapunkt des Hexenglaubens
- Ketzer und Kirche. Beobachtungen aus zwei Jahrtausenden (Christentum und Dissidenz 1), Münster 2014. ISBN 978-3-643-12271-1
- Frauen und Häresie. Europas christliches Erbe (Christentum und Dissidenz 2), Münster 2015. ISBN 978-3-643-12743-3
- The Making of a Cathar Counter-Church, the 'Ecclesia dei', through the Consolamentum Ritual (Baptism of the Holy Spirit), In: Bibliothèque de la Revue d'Histoire Ecclésiastique, 106, 2020, 119–161.
