= Luis de Carvajal (theologian) =

Catholic 16th century theologian

Luis de Carvajal was a Spanish Franciscan theologian of the Council of Trent.

== Life ==
Of the noble family of Carvajal in Baetica, Carvajal at an early age was sent to the University of Paris, where he completed his studies. Having entered the Franciscan Order, he taught theology at Paris, whence he was sent as legate of Cardinal Angelus to the Council of Trent.

During the fifth session, in which the doctrine of original sin was discussed, Carvajal addressed the Council in favour of the Immaculate Conception, in defending which he had already won fame at Paris. The 1913 Catholic Encyclopedia speculates that the words beginning "Declarat tamen", at the end of the fifth canon of this session, were added in response to Caravajal.

== Works ==
Carvajal's writings include:

- Apologia monasticae professionis (Antwerp, 1529), a defence of the religious orders against Erasmus
- Declamatio expostulatoria pro immaculatâ conceptione (Paris, 1541)
- Theologicarum sententiarum liber singularis (3rd edition, Antwerp, 1548)
