= Throckmorton =

Throckmorton or the variant spelling Throgmorton may refer to:

== Places ==
- Throckmorton, Texas, county seat of Throckmorton County, United States
- Throckmorton, Worcestershire, a small village near Pershore, United Kingdom
- Throckmorton County, Texas, United States
- Throgmorton Street in the City of London

== People ==
- Burton H. Throckmorton Jr. (1921–2009), American New Testament scholar, author of Gospel Parallels
- Calvin Throckmorton (born 1996), American football player
- Clare McLaren-Throckmorton (1935–2017), British barrister and Queen's Counsel
- Clement Throckmorton (died 1573) (c. 1512–1573), English landowner and Member of Parliament
- Clement Throckmorton (MP for Warwickshire), English politician who sat in the House of Commons between 1624 and 1626
- Clement Throckmorton (died 1663) (1630–1663), English politician, Member of the House of Commons variously between 1656 and 1663
- Cleon Throckmorton (1897-1965), American painter, theatrical designer, producer, and architect
- Elizabeth Raleigh (née Elizabeth Throckmorton) (1565–c. 1647), English courtier, wife of Sir Walter Raleigh
- Francis Throckmorton (1554–1584), nephew of Sir Nicholas and a conspirator against Queen Elizabeth I
- Elizabeth Throckmorton (prioress) (1694–1760), Englishwoman who served as prioress of the Convent of Our Blessed Lady of Syon in Paris
- Sir George Throckmorton (bef. 1489–1552), English politician, Member of Parliament
- James Fron Sonny Throckmorton (born 1941), American country music songwriter
- James W. Throckmorton (1825–1894), American politician, Governor of Texas, U.S. Representative, Texas Senator
- Jeannette Throckmorton (1883–1963), American physician, public health lecturer, medical librarian, quilter
- Job Throckmorton (1545–1601), English pamphleteer
- General John L. Throckmorton (1913–1986), American general, Deputy Commander, Military Assistance Command, Vietnam, 1964–1965
- Joseph Throckmorton (1800–1872), American steamboat builder
- Sir Nicholas Throckmorton (c. 1515–1571), English diplomat and politician
- Peter Throckmorton (1928–1990), American journalist and underwater archaeologist
- Robert Throckmorton (disambiguation)
- Tom Bentley Throckmorton (1885–1961), American neurologist
- Warren Throckmorton (born 1957), psychologist famous for his work in the area of sexual orientation
- William Edward Throckmorton (1795–1843), pioneer and father of James W. Throckmorton

== Characters ==
- Throckmorton P. Gilder-sleeve, title character in The Great Gildersleeve
- Throckmorton P. Ruddigore, central character in Jack L. Chalker's The Dancing Gods series

== Other ==
- Throckmorton Plot, in English history
- Throckmorton baronets
- Throckmorton sign, a radiology joke
- United States v. Throckmorton, US Supreme Court case abbreviated as Throckmorton
