= Sir Robert Throckmorton, 3rd Baronet =

Sir Robert Throckmorton, 4th Bt
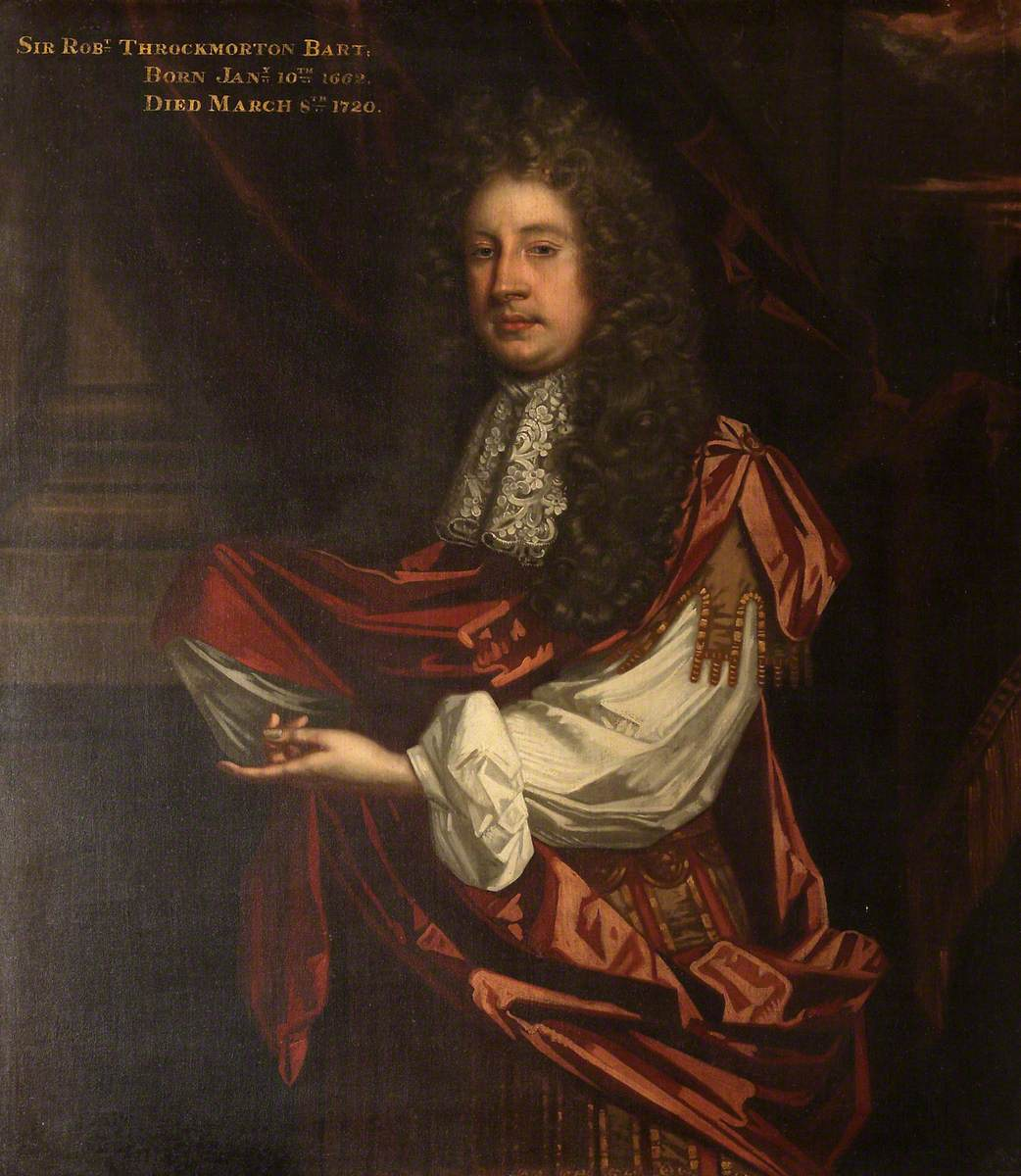
- Portrait of Sir Robert, by the studio of Sir Peter Lely, between 1680 and 1710
- Born: 10 January 1662; Moorhall, Warwickshire
- Died: 8 March 1720 (aged 58)
- Spouse: Mary Yate
- Children: Elizabeth Throckmorton; Sir Robert Throckmorton, 4th Baronet
- Parent(s): Sir Francis Throckmorton, 2nd Baronet; Anne Monson
- Relatives: Anne Throckmorton (sister)

Sir Robert Throckmorton, 3rd Baronet (10 January 1662 – 8 March 1720), was a member of a prominent English family of Roman Catholic dissenters.

== Early life ==
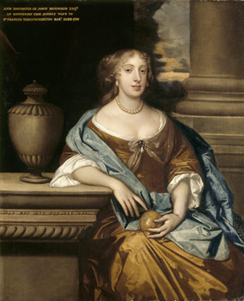
Portrait of his mother, Anne, by the studio of Sir Peter Lely, between c. 1660 and c. 1680

Throckmorton was born on 10 January 1662 at Moorhall, Warwickshire. He was the eldest son of Sir Francis Throckmorton, 2nd Baronet and the former Anne Monson. Among his siblings were Mary Throckmorton (the wife of Martin Wollascot), Anne Throckmorton (the Abbess of the English Augustinian Convent of Notre Dame de Sion in Paris), and George Throckmorton (a Jansenist dévot who had a religious life).

His paternal grandparents were Sir Robert Throckmorton, 1st Baronet and, his second wife, Mary Smyth (daughter of Sir Francis Smyth of Ashby Folville, Queensborough, Leicestershire and Wootton Wawen, Warwickshire). His grandmother was the sister of Charles Smyth, 1st Viscount Carrington. His mother was a daughter of John Monson, Esq. of Kinnersley (son of Admiral Sir William Monson and brother to William Monson, 1st Viscount Monson of Castlemaine) and the former Anne Mayne (a daughter of James Mayne).

== Career ==
On 7 November 1680, Robert succeeded his father as the 3rd Baronet Throckmorton, of Coughton. The first baronet, so created in 1642, was Robert's grandfather, Sir Robert Throckmorton, whose estates were sequestered in the Civil War. The 3rd Baronet was one of the Catholic non-jurors, and upon his marriage to Mary Yate, acquired an estate at Buckland, at the north-western extremity of Berkshire.

He was admitted to Gray's Inn on 15 January 1682.

== Personal life ==
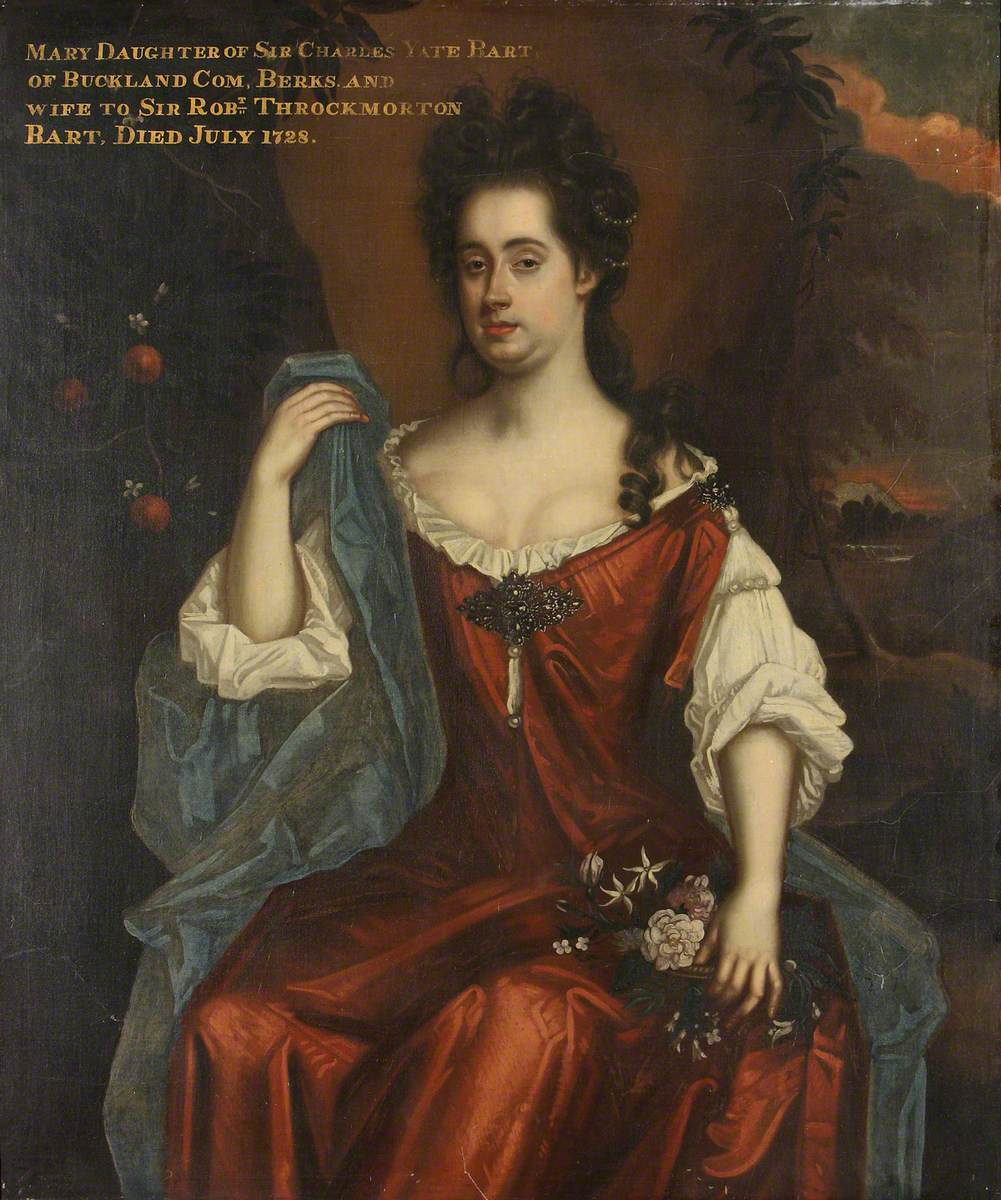
Portrait of his wife, Mary, by Willem Wissing, between 1670 and 1699

Throckmorton was married to Mary Yate (d. 1722), a daughter of Sir Charles Yate, 3rd Baronet of Buckland and the former Frances Gage (a daughter of Sir Thomas Gage, 2nd Baronet of Firle Place). Together, they were the parents of:

- Elizabeth Throckmorton (1694–1760), the prioress of the Convent of Our Blessed Lady of Syon in Paris.
- Charlotte Throckmorton, who married Sir Thomas Hunloke, 3rd Baronet, son of Sir Henry Hunloke, 2nd Baronet and Catherine Tyrwhitt.
- Barbara Throckmorton, who married Peter Giffard, 20th of Chillington.
- Apollonia Throckmorton (d. 1749), who married Sir Edward Blount, 4th Baronet, son of George Blount (a son of Sir George Blount, 2nd Baronet) and Constantia Cary (a daughter of Sir George Cary), in 1722.
- Anne Throckmorton, who married John Petre, a son of Joseph Petre (descendant of the 2nd Baron Petre).
- Mary Throckmorton, who married James Fermor, who lived at Tusmore, Oxfordshire.
- Robert Throckmorton, who died in infancy.
- George Throckmorton (1690–1706), who died unmarried.
- Sir Robert Throckmorton, 4th Baronet (1702–1791), who married Lady Theresa Herbert, a daughter of William Herbert, 2nd Marquess of Powis and the former Mary Preston, in c. 1721. After her death in 1723, he married Catherine Collingwood, daughter of George Collingwood, of Eslington (who had been executed for his part in the Jacobite rising of 1715), in 1738. After her death in 1761, he married Lucy Heywood, a daughter of James Heywood of Maristow House and Jamaica, in 1763.

Sir Robert died on 8 March 1720 and was buried at Weston Underwood, Buckinghamshire. As his eldest son lived for only two weeks and his second son died young, his third son, Robert inherited the baronetcy and the family estates.

=== Descendants ===
Through his daughter Charlotte, he was a grandfather of Sir Henry Hunloke, 4th Baronet (1724–1804), who married Margaret Coke.

Through his daughter Barbara, he was a grandfather of Maria Giffard, who married Sir Edward Smythe, 4th Baronet.

Through his daughter Apollonia, he was a grandfather of Sir Edward Blount, 5th Baronet and Sir Walter Blount, 6th Baronet.

Baronetage of England
Preceded by Francis Throckmorton	Baronet (of Coughton); 1680 – 1720	Succeeded by Robert Throckmorton
