= Sir Robert Throckmorton, 4th Baronet =

Sir Robert Throckmorton, 4th Bt
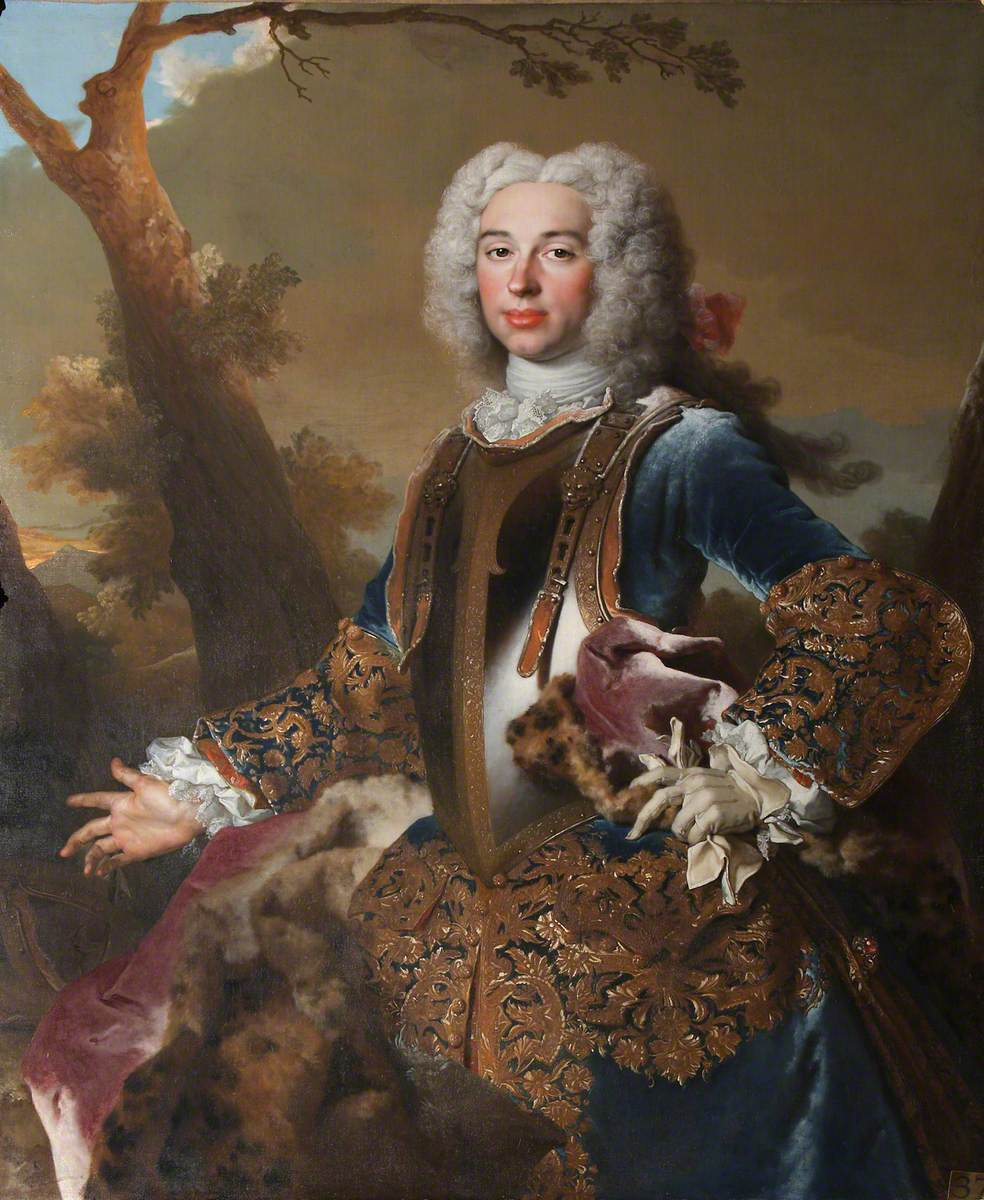
- Portrait of Sir Robert Throckmorton, by Nicolas de Largillière, c. 1728

Personal details
- Born: 21 August 1702; Weston Underwood, Buckinghamshire
- Died: 8 December 1791 (aged 89); Buckland, Oxfordshire
- Spouse(s): Lady Theresa Herbert; Catherine Collingwood; Lucy Heywood
- Relations: Sir Charles Yate, 3rd Baronet (grandfather); Sir Francis Throckmorton, 2nd Baronet (grandfather); Elizabeth Throckmorton (sister); Anne Throckmorton (aunt)
- Parent(s): Sir Robert Throckmorton, 3rd Baronet; Mary Yate

Sir Robert Throckmorton, 4th Baronet (21 August 1702 – 8 December 1791), was a member of a prominent English family of Roman Catholic dissenters.

== Early life ==
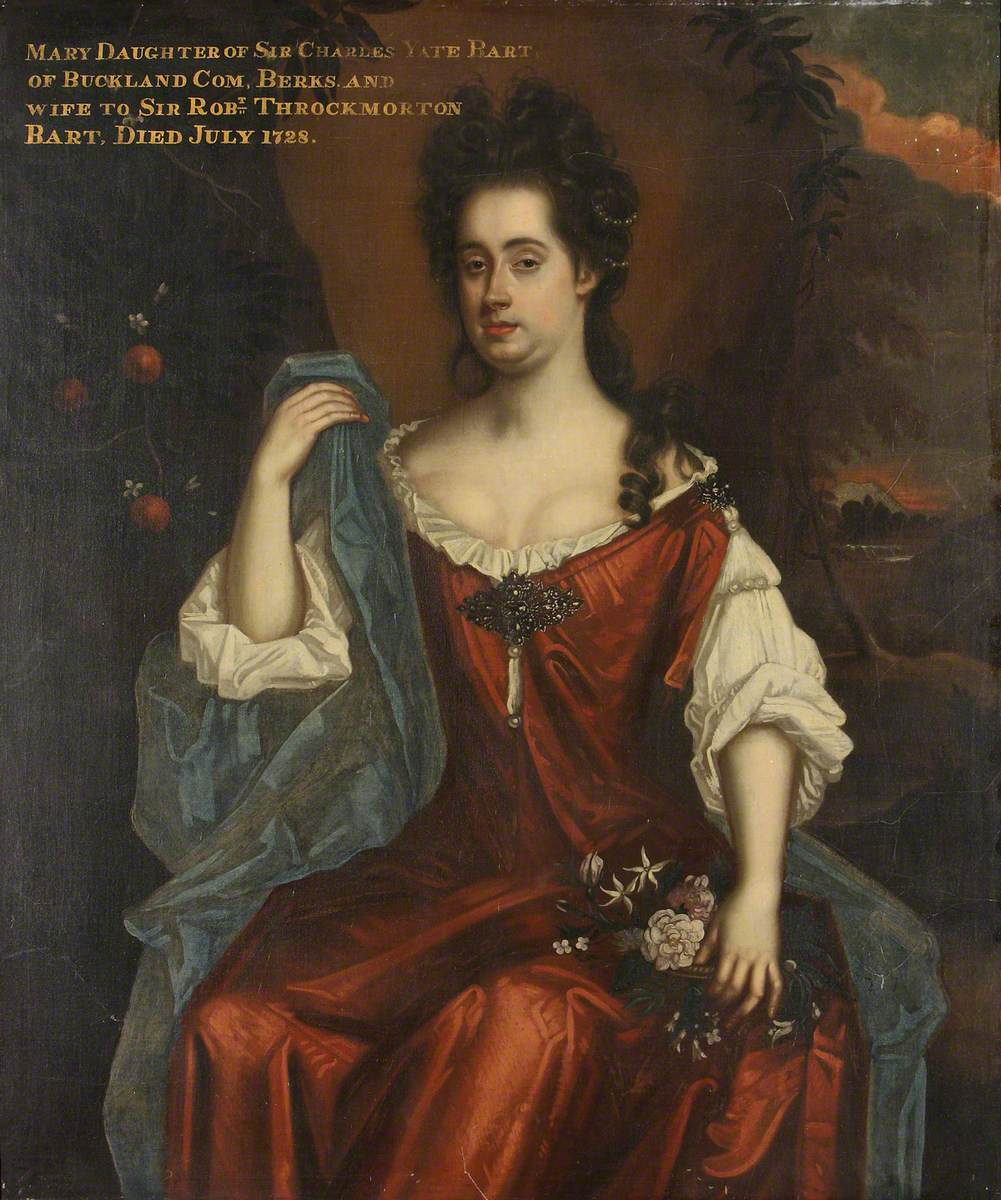
Portrait of his mother, Mary Yate, by Willem Wissing, between 1670 and 1699

Throckmorton was born on 21 August 1702 and was baptised on 22 August 1702 at Weston Underwood, Buckinghamshire. He was the third son of Sir Robert Throckmorton, 3rd Baronet and Mary Yate (d. 1722). As the third son, Robert was not in position to inherit the baronetcy from his father at the time of his birth, however, his parents' eldest son, also named "Robert", lived for only two weeks. Two years after Robert died, his parents had a second son, named "George" and Robert was born 12 years after George who would have inherited the baronetcy, but died before their father did. Among his siblings were Elizabeth Throckmorton (prioress of the Convent of Our Blessed Lady of Syon in Paris), Charlotte Throckmorton (wife of Sir Thomas Hunloke, 3rd Baronet), Barbara Throckmorton (wife of Peter Giffard, 20th of Chillington), Apollonia Throckmorton (wife of Sir Edward Blount, 4th Baronet), Anne Throckmorton (wife of John Petre, a descendant of the 2nd Baron Petre), and Mary Throckmorton (wife of James Fermor).

His paternal grandparents were son of Sir Francis Throckmorton, 2nd Baronet and the former Anne Monson (a granddaughter of Admiral Sir William Monson). His aunt, Anne Throckmorton, was Abbess of the English Augustinian Convent of Notre Dame de Sion in Paris. His maternal grandparents were Sir Charles Yate, 3rd Baronet of Buckland and the former Frances Gage (a daughter of Sir Thomas Gage, 2nd Baronet of Firle Place).

== Career ==
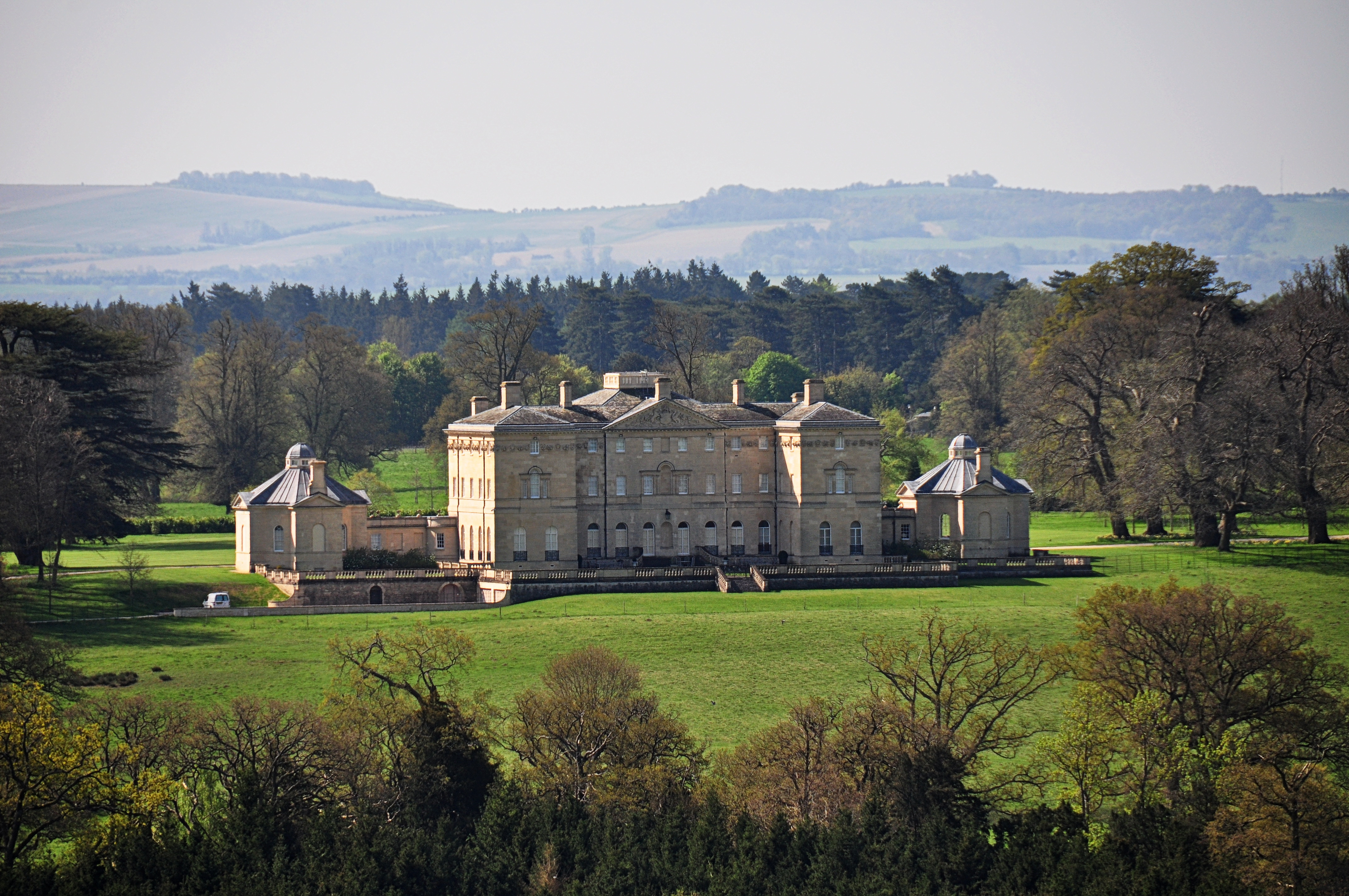
Buckland House

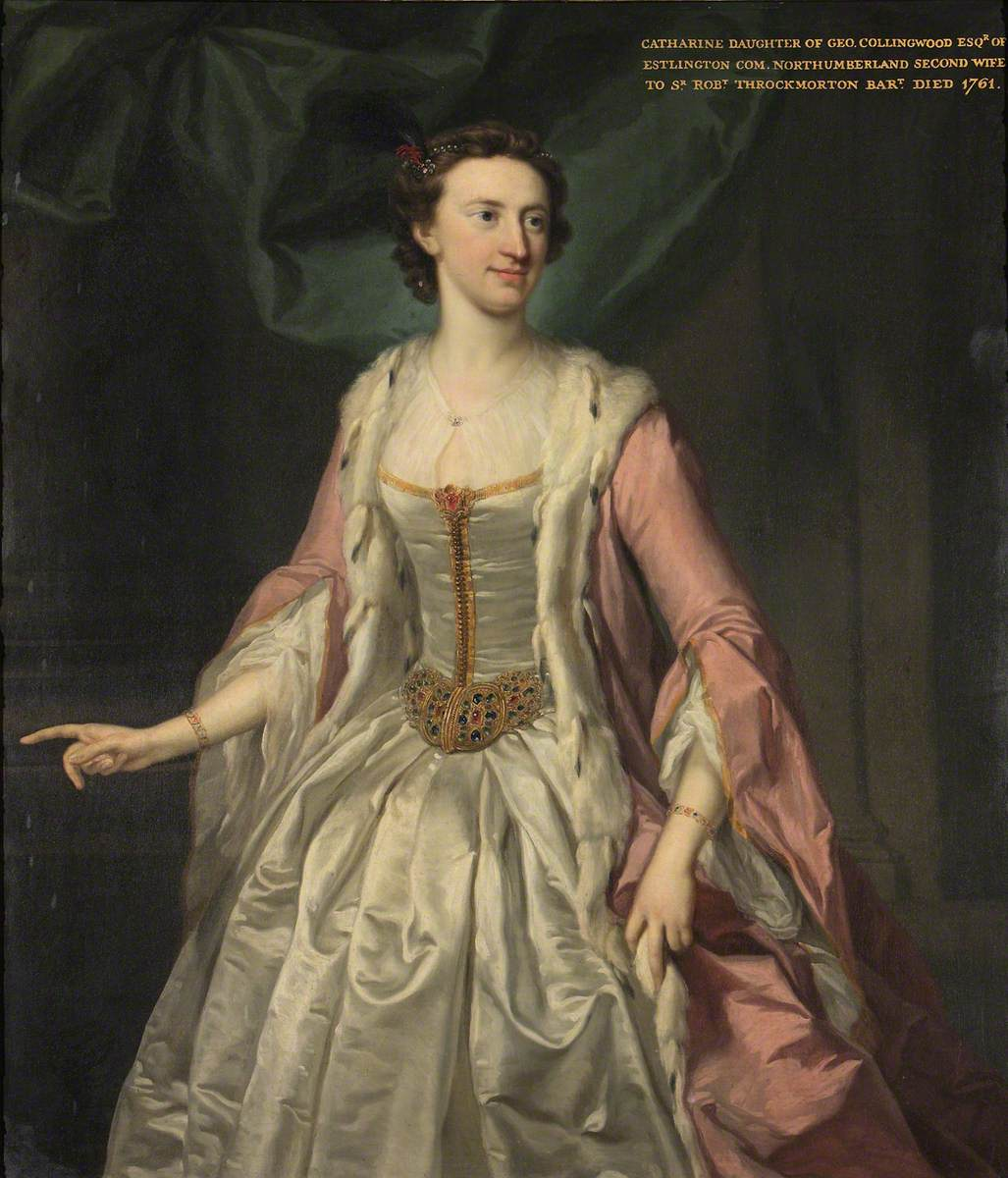
Portrait of his second wife, Catherine, by George Knapton, between c. 1740 and c. 1745.

Following the death of his father on 8 March 1720, he succeeded as the 4th Baronet Throckmorton, of Coughton. The Throckmorton baronetcy had been created by King Charles I in gratitude for Sir Robert Throckmorton's support of the monarchy during the English Civil War.

In 1748, shortly after the marriage of his son George, Sir Robert and his wife Catherine settled at the Buckland estate, which he inherited from his mother's family, the Yates. Sir Robert built a new house at Buckland in 1757 from plans developed by John Wood, the Elder, best known as the architect of Bath. Wood died before the house was built, so his son, John Wood, the Younger completed the Palladian house, known as Buckland House. Sir Robert hired artist Giovanni Battista Cipriani to paint the ceiling of the library in the east pavilion of the house.

== Personal life ==
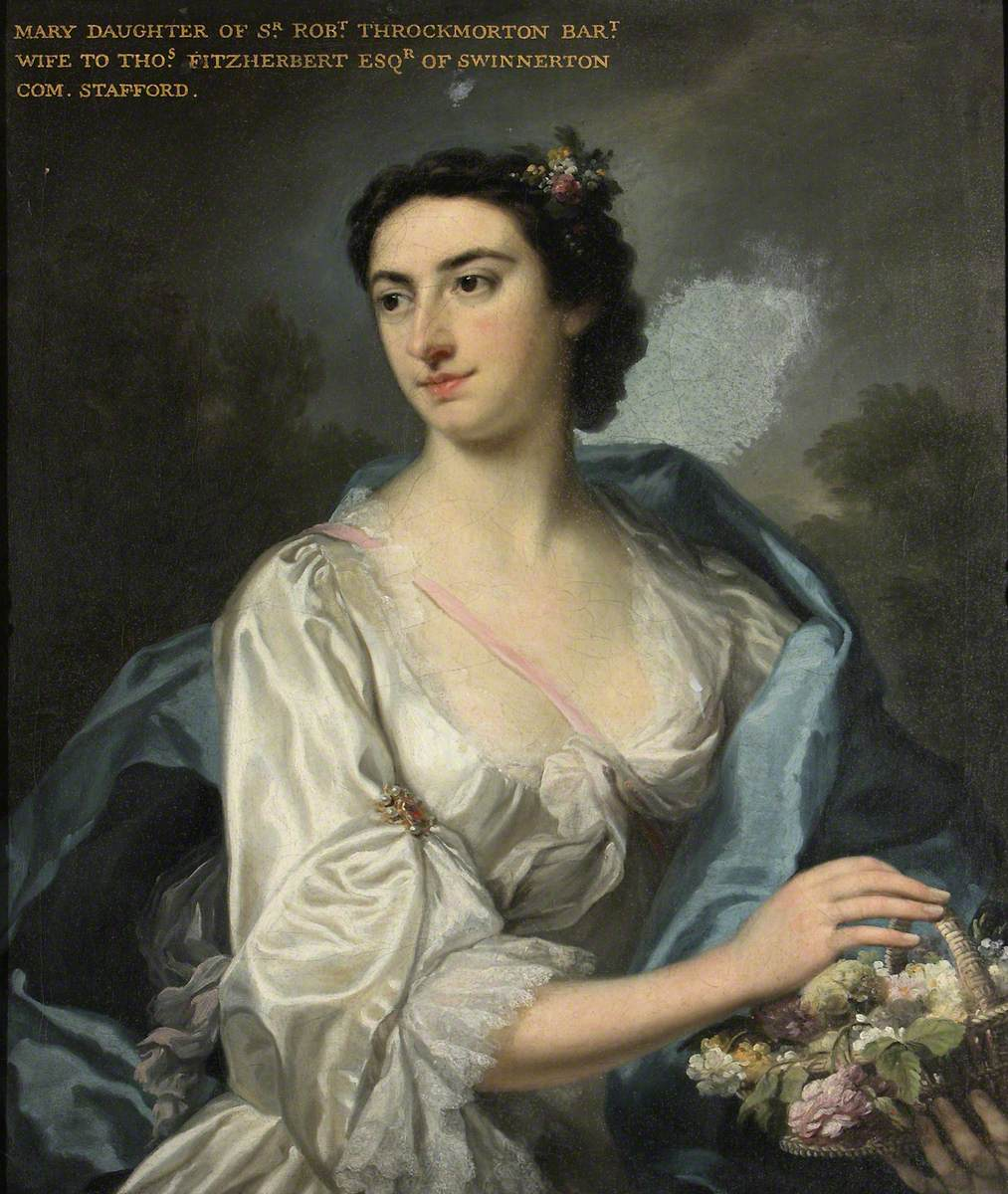
Portrait of his daughter, Mary Teresa Fitzherbert, by George Knapton, c. 1743

Sir Robert was married three times. His first marriage was in c. 1721 to Lady Theresa Herbert (1706–1723), daughter of William Herbert, 2nd Marquess of Powis and the former Mary Preston (daughter and co-heir of Sir Thomas Preston, 3rd Baronet of Furness). Before her death in 1723, they were the parents of:

- Robert Throckmorton, who died unmarried in Paris as a child.
- George Throckmorton (1721–1767), who married Anne Maria Paston, daughter of William Paston and Mary (née Courtenay) Paston.
- Mary Teresa Throckmorton (1723–1791), who married Thomas Fitzherbert, son of Thomas Fitzherbert and Constantia (née Southcote) Fitzherbert, in 1743.

In January 1738, he married Catherine Collingwood (d. 1761), daughter of George Collingwood, of Eslington (who had been executed for his part in the Jacobite rising of 1715). Before her death in 1761, they were the parents of:

- Barbara Throckmorton (d. 1764), who married Thomas Giffard, 22nd of Chillington, son of Peter Giffard, 20th of Chillington, in 1763.

In 1763, he married Lucy Heywood at St George Hanover Square. Lucy was a daughter of Mary (née Elton) Heywood (daughter of Sir Abraham Elton, 2nd Baronet of Clevedon Court, MP for Bristol and Taunton) and James Heywood of Maristow House and Jamaica. Her brother was James Modyford Heywood, MP for Fowey and Lord of the Admiralty.

He died on 8 December 1791 at age 89 and was buried at Coughton, Warwickshire. As his son predeceased him, he was succeeded in the baronetcy by his grandson, Sir John Throckmorton, 5th Baronet. His widow Lucy died four years later on 20 November 1795.

Baronetage of England
| Preceded by Robert Throckmorton | Baronet (of Coughton); 1720 – 1791 | Succeeded by John Courtenay Throckmorton |
