= Robert Throckmorton =

Robert Throckmorton may refer to:

- Sir Robert Throckmorton (courtier) (c. 1513–1581), English courtier and member of parliament
- Sir Robert Throckmorton, 1st Baronet (1599–1650)
- Sir Robert Throckmorton, 3rd Baronet (1662–1720)
- Sir Robert Throckmorton, 4th Baronet (1702–1791)
- Sir Robert Throckmorton, 8th Baronet (1800–1862), English member of parliament
