= Sir Francis Throckmorton, 2nd Baronet =

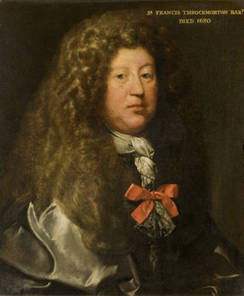
"Sir Francis Throckmorton, Bart. Died 1680". School of Sir Peter Lely (1618–1680), on the staircase at Coughton Court, Warwickshire. Throckmorton Collection, Coughton Court, now owned by the National Trust, NTPL ref: 153572

Sir Francis Throckmorton, 2nd Baronet (1641–1680), of Coughton Court, Warwickshire and Weston Underwood, Buckinghamshire, was a member of a prominent English family of Roman Catholic dissenters.

== Early life ==
Francis was born in 1641, the son of Sir Robert Throckmorton, 1st Baronet (d.1650) by his second wife Mary Smyth, daughter of Sir Francis Smyth (d.1629) of Ashby Folville and Queensborough, Leicestershire and Wootton Wawen, Warwickshire, by Anne Markham. His uncle was Charles Smyth, 1st Viscount Carrington.

== Career ==
On 16 January 1650, he succeeded his father as the 2nd Baronet Throckmorton, of Coughton.

== Personal life ==
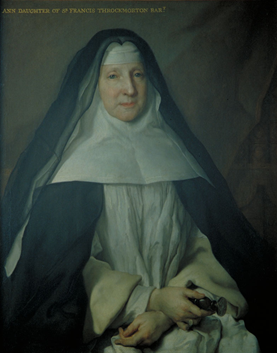
"Ann daughter of Sr. Francis Throckmorton Bart." Commissioned in 1729, painted by Nicolas de Largillière (d.1746). (property of the National Trust), no: 135583

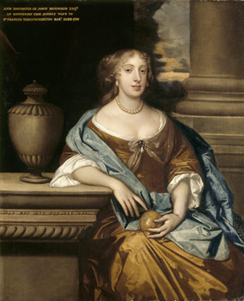
"Ann daughter of John Mounson Esq. of Kinnersley com. Surrey wife to Sr. Francis Throckmorton Bart. Died..." Studio of Sir Peter Lely (1618–1680). Throckmorton Collection, Coughton Court (property of the National Trust) NTPL ref: 89045

He married Anne Monson (d.1728), daughter of John Monson, a Catholic and eldest son of Admiral Sir William Monson (1569–1643) of Kinnersley Manor, Horley, Surrey and Croft and Skegness in Lincolnshire. Anne sold Kinnersley in 1666. He and Anne had the following children:

- Mary Throckmorton, who married Martin Wollascot.
- Sir Robert Throckmorton, 3rd Baronet (1662-1720/1), who married Mary Yate, daughter of Sir Charles Yate, 3rd Baronet of Buckland.
- Anne Throckmorton (1664-1734), Abbess 1720-1728 of the English Augustinian Convent of Notre-Dame-de-Sion, Paris.
- George Throckmorton (1671-1705), had a religious life, a Jansenist dévot

Sir Francis and his wife, Anne, separated in 1677 and she went to live in a convent in Paris. Sir Francis died on 7 November 1680 and was buried at Weston Underwood, Buckinghamshire. His will was granted probate in 1681.

== Sources ==
- thePeerage.com

Baronetage of England
Preceded by Robert Throckmorton	Baronet (of Coughton); 1650 – 1680	Succeeded by Robert Throckmorton
