= Sir Charles Yate, 3rd Baronet =

Sir Charles Yate, Bt
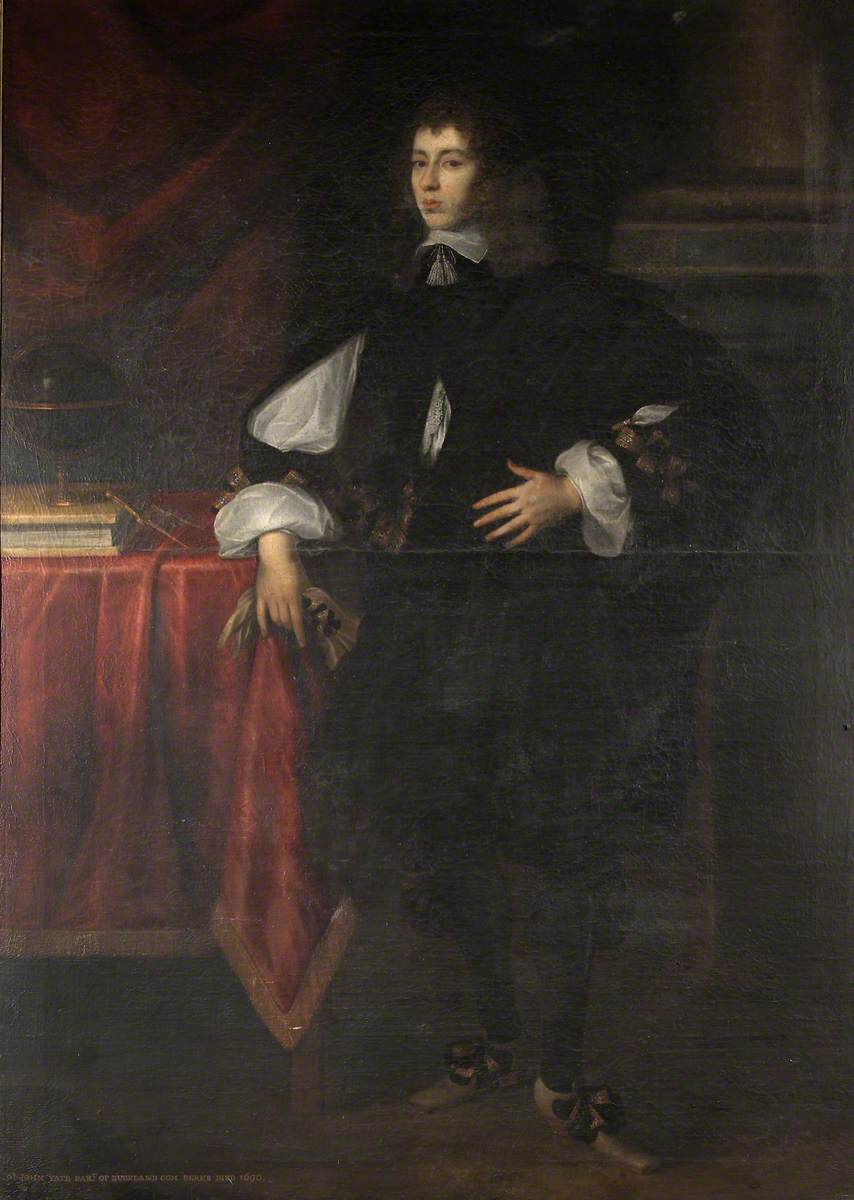
- Portrait of Sir Charles as a Young Man, by Pieter Borsseler, c. 1664
- Born: c. 1643; Buckland, Berkshire
- Died: c. 1680
- Spouse: Frances Gage
- Children: Sir John Yate, 4th Baronet; Mary, Lady Throckmorton
- Parent(s): Sir John Yate, 2nd Baronet; Mary Pakington
- Relatives: Sir Robert Throckmorton, 4th Baronet (grandson)

Sir Charles Yate, 3rd Baronet (c. 1643 – c. 1680) was an English landowner.

== Early life ==
Escutcheon of the Yate baronets of Buckland

Yate was born c. 1643 at Buckland, Berkshire. He was the son of Sir John Yate, 2nd Baronet (d. c. 1658) and the former Mary Pakington.

His paternal grandparents were Sir Edward Yate, 1st Baronet and the former Katherine Baker (a sister of Sir Henry Baker, 1st Baronet, daughter of Sir John Baker, and granddaughter of Sir Richard Baker of Sissinghurst Castle). His maternal grandparents were Humphrey Pakington of Harvington and Abigail (née Sacheverell) Pakington.

== Career ==
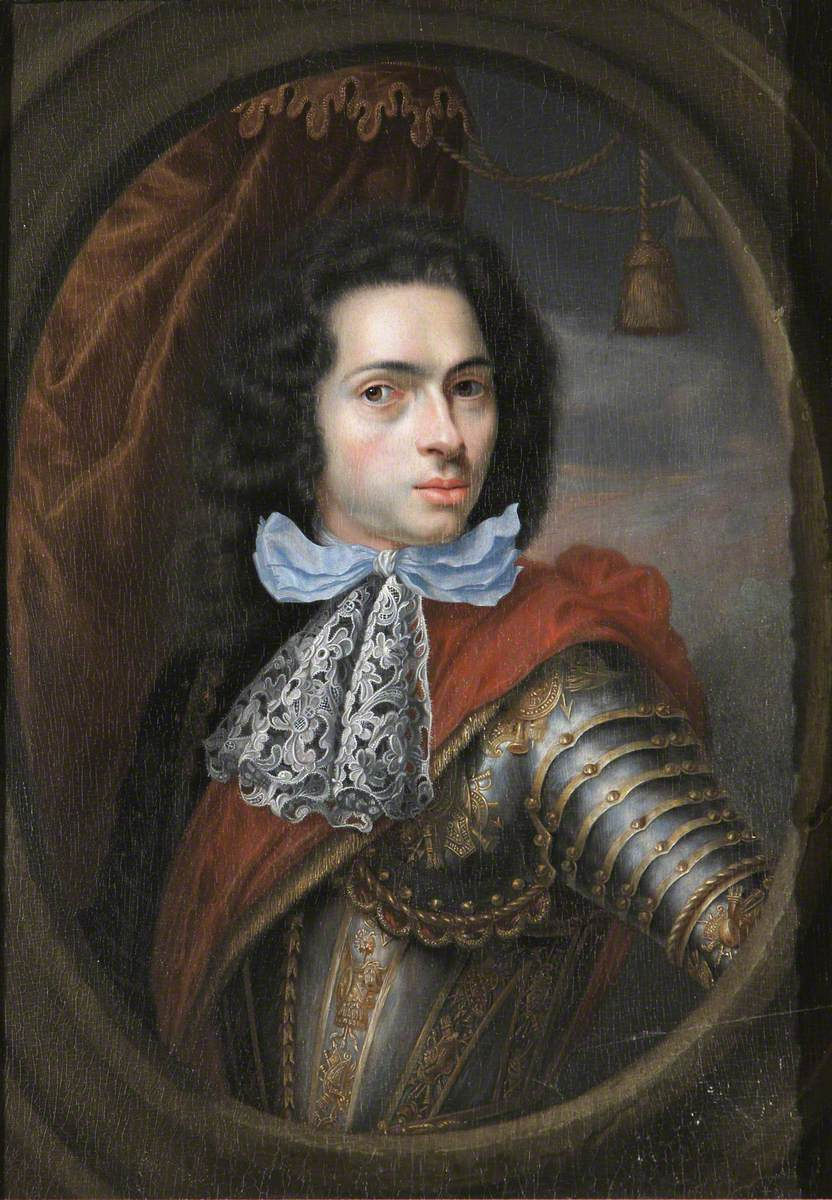
Portrait of his son, Sir John Yate, 4th Baronet, by the Dutch School, c. 1680

Upon the death of his father in c. 1658, succeeded his father as the 3rd Baronet Yate, of Buckland. The Manor of Buckland was held by the De La Poles, Dukes of Suffolk before it passed to the Yate family in 1545.

== Personal life ==
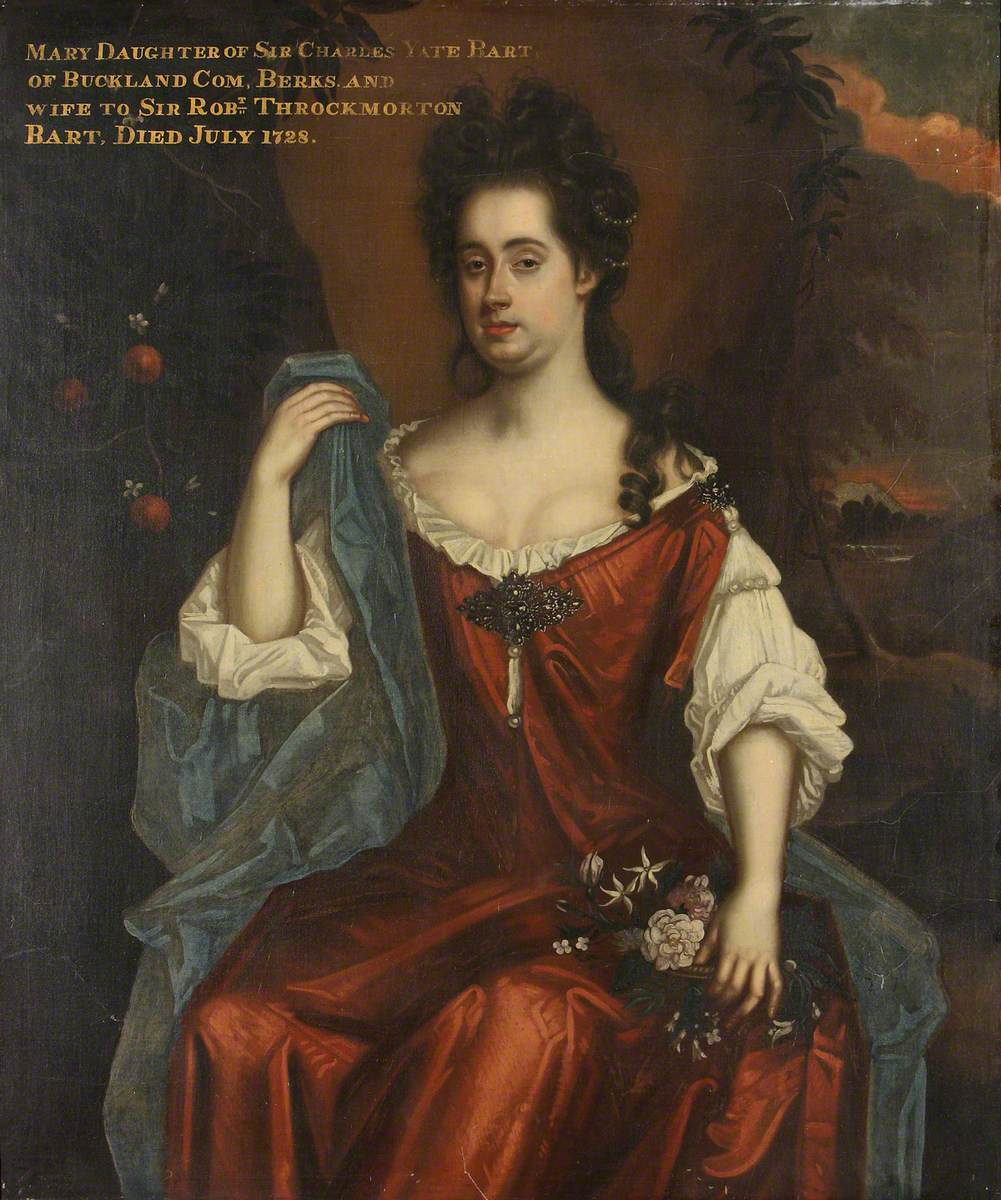
Portrait of his daughter, Mary, Lady Throckmorton, by Willem Wissing, between 1670 and 1699

Yate married Frances Gage, a daughter of Sir Thomas Gage, 2nd Baronet of Firle Place and the former Mary Chamberlain (the daughter and co-heiress of John Chamberlain). After the death of her father, her mother married Sir Henry Goring, 2nd Baronet. Together, they were the parents of:

- Sir John Yate, 4th Baronet (c. 1660–1690), who died without issue.
- Mary Yate (c. 1668–1722), who married Sir Robert Throckmorton, 3rd Baronet, a son of Sir Francis Throckmorton, 2nd Baronet of Coughton Court in Warwickshire.

Yate died c. 1680 and was succeeded in the baronetcy and his estates by his son, John upon whose death the title became extinct in 1690. The Yate estates then descended to his daughter, Mary, Lady Throckmorton and her descendants. They went on to build much of the current estate. In the mid-1750s, Yate's grandson, Sir Robert Throckmorton, 4th Baronet (who married Lady Theresa Herbert, daughter of William Herbert, 2nd Marquess of Powis), had a new house built, Buckland House, and the old manor house became his stables.

Baronetage of England
Preceded by John Yate	Baronet (of Buckland); 1658-1680	Succeeded by John Yate
