= Cherbury Camp =

Site of an Iron Age fort in Oxfordshire, England

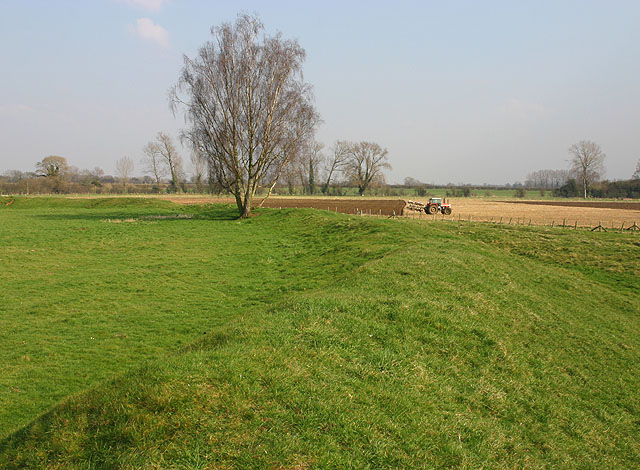

- Location within Oxfordshire
- 51.66424°N 1.46066°W
- Type: Earthwork
- Location: Charney Bassett, Oxfordshire

Scheduled monument
- Official name: Cherbury camp
- Reference no.: 1015551

Cherbury Camp is a multi-vallate hill fort-like earthwork, at grid reference SU374963, 1 mi (1.6 km) north of the village of Charney Bassett in the Vale of White Horse, Oxfordshire, United Kingdom. The site is connected to the village by a footpath.

== History and legend ==
This appears to be an Iron Age fortification but is far from any hill or other vantage point. It is, nonetheless, larger than its counterpart, Uffington Castle, on the nearby Berkshire Downs. The surrounding area was likely to have been marshy, so the site may have had strategic importance. In structure and unusual siting, it resembles nearby Hardwell Castle.

Legend has it that the local inhabitants of Uffington Castle travelled the intervening 6 miles (9.7 km) to raid Cherbury Camp, where King Canute and his invading army were encamped. However, a young shepherd boy spotted them and blew his horn as a warning to the Danes. They are said to have consequently prevailed in the subsequent battle, which took place at the crossroads halfway between Charney Bassett and Buckland. The area became known as Gainfield as a result. The shepherd boy was granted all the land within the sound of his horn, around Pusey, as a reward for his vigilance.

However true or otherwise this local legend may be, the horn, known as the Pusey Horn, is now housed in the Victoria and Albert Museum. There was also once an inn in Charney Bassett called the Horn Inn. It closed during the Second World War.

== Excavation ==
An archaeological excavation was carried out at Cherbury camp in the late 1930s. The report was published in Oxoniensia. A geophysical survey was conducted in 2007. The site is a scheduled monument.
