= Baker baronets =

There have been four creations of baronetcies with the surname Baker.

- Baker Baronets of Sissinghurst (1611)
- Baker baronets of Loventor, Devon (1776): see Baker Wilbraham baronets
- Baker of baronets of Dunstable, Bedfordshire (1796): see Sherston-Baker baronets
- Baker Baronets of Ranston (1802)
