= Sir John Baker, 2nd Baronet =

English politician

Sir John Baker, 2nd Baronet (c. 1608 – 15 January 1653) was an English politician who sat in the House of Commons of England in 1640. He supported the Royalist side in the English Civil War.

Baker was the son of Sir Henry Baker, 1st Baronet of Sissinghurst Castle and his wife Catherine Smythe. He inherited the baronetcy on the death of his father in 1623. He was educated at Jesus College, Cambridge. In 1633 he was High Sheriff of Kent.

In April 1640, Baker was elected Member of Parliament for Hastings for the Short Parliament. He was not elected to the Long Parliament He was fined £3,000 for supporting the Royalist cause on 22 April 1644.

Baker died at Cranbrook, Kent and was buried in St Dunstan's Church.

Baker married Eleanor Parkhurst, daughter of Sir Robert Parkhurst, Lord Mayor of London and his wife Eleanor Babington. He was succeeded by his son Sir John Baker, 3rd Baronet and on the latter's death in 1661, the baronetcy became extinct.

Parliament of England
Parliament suspended since 1629	Member of Parliament for Hastings; 1640; With: Robert Reed	Succeeded by John Ashburnham; Sir Thomas Eversfield
Baronetage of England
Preceded by Henry Baker	Baronet (of Sisinghurst); 1623–1653	Succeeded by John Baker
