= Buckland, Oxfordshire =

Village in Oxfordshire, England

Coordinates: 51.679°N 1.506°W

Buckland
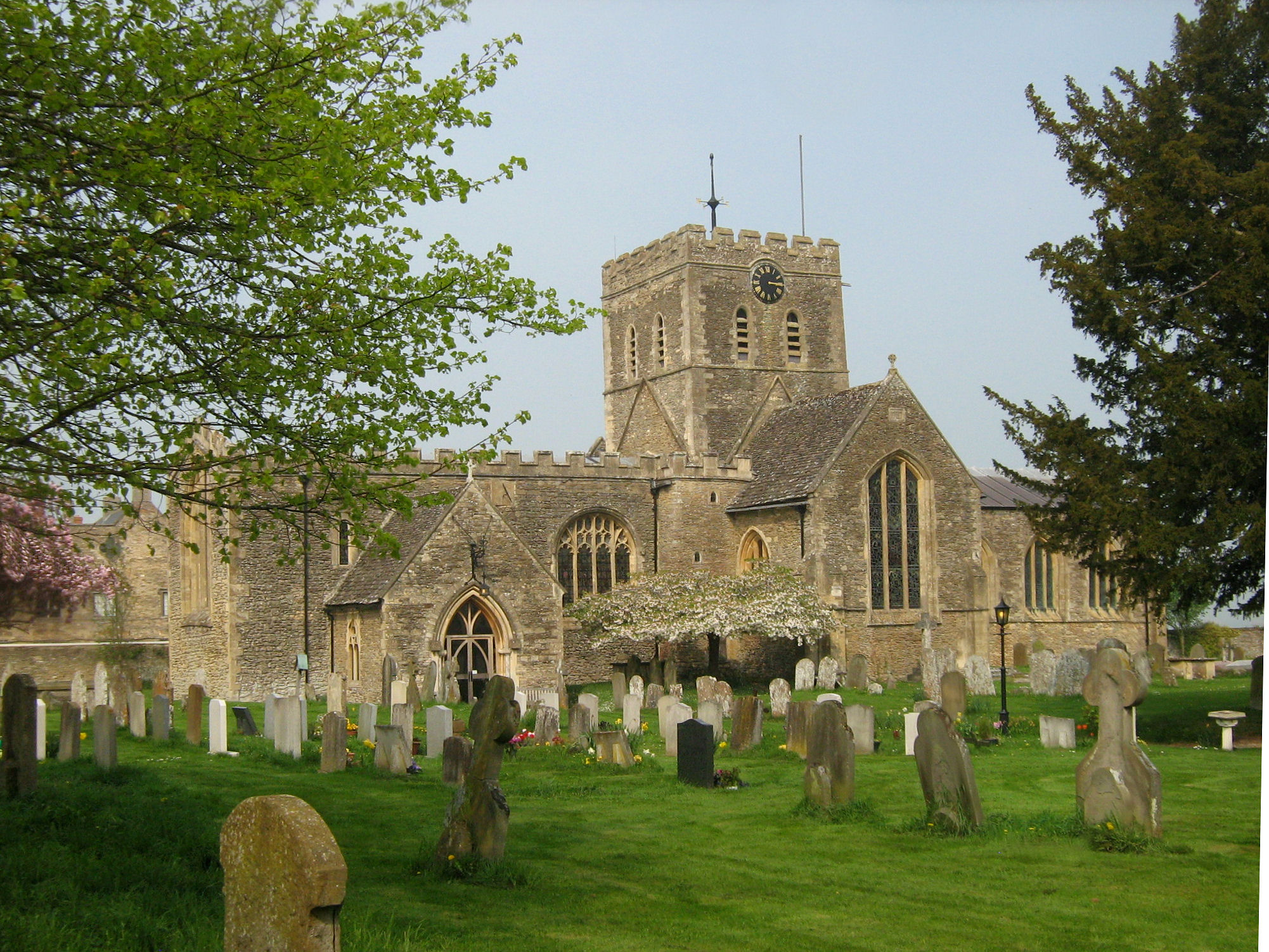
- St Mary the Virgin parish church

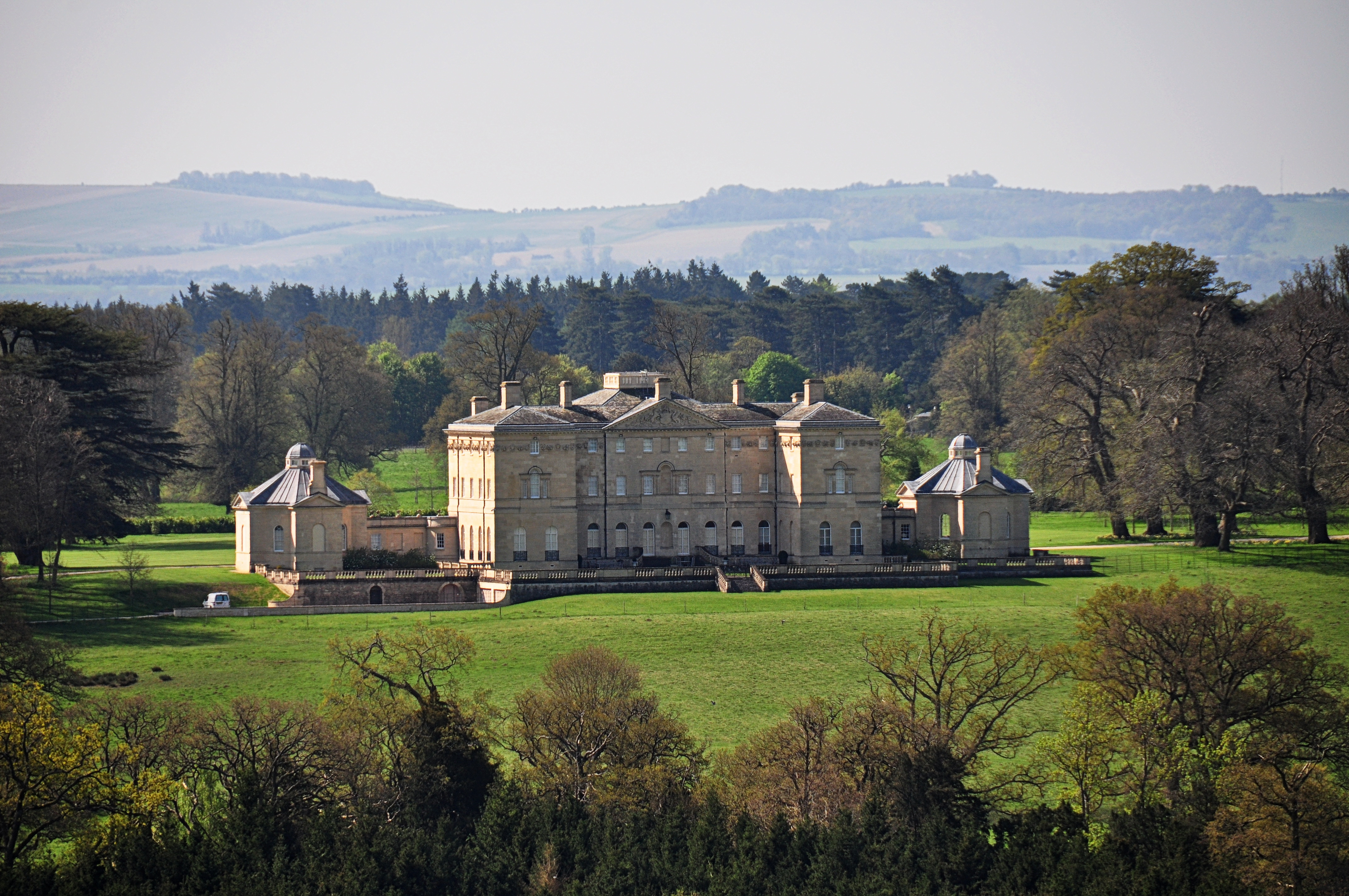
- Buckland House with surrounding countryside

- Location within Oxfordshire
- Area: 18.23 km^{2} (7.04 sq mi)
- Population: 588 (parish, including Gainfield) (2011 Census)
  - Density: 32/km^{2} (83/sq mi)
- OS grid reference: SU3498
- Civil parish: Buckland
- District: Vale of White Horse
- Shire county: Oxfordshire
- Region: South East
- Country: England
- Sovereign state: United Kingdom
- Post town: Faringdon
- Postcode district: SN7
- Dialling code: 01367
- Police: Thames Valley
- Fire: Oxfordshire
- Ambulance: South Central
- UK Parliament: Witney
- Website: Buckland, Oxfordshire

Buckland is a village and large civil parish about 4 miles (6.4 km) northeast of Faringdon in the Vale of White Horse District. Buckland was part of Berkshire until the 1974 boundary changes transferred it to Oxfordshire. The 2011 Census recorded the parish's population as 588. Outside the village the civil parish includes the small settlements of Carswell and Barcote to the west, Buckland Marsh to the north, and the modern development of Gainfield on the southern boundary.

== Geography ==
The parish is an irregular shape, measuring about 3 miles (5 km) north – south and 2 3/4 miles (4.4 km) east – west at its widest point. In 1924 the area of the parish was 4,505 acres (1,823 ha). The River Thames forms the northern boundary of the parish, just over 1 mile (1.6 km) north of the village. Until 1974 this was also the Berkshire county boundary with Oxfordshire. Streams that flow into the River Ock form its southern boundary. It is bounded by field boundaries to the east and west. The soil of the parish is a rich, sandy loam on a geology of Corallian Limestone and Oxford Clay.

== Toponym ==
"Buckland" is a common toponym in southern England. It is derived from the Old English bōcland — bookland — which is a term in Anglo-Saxon law for "land held by charter". The earliest known record in this case is as Bocland in a charter from 957 now reproduced in the Cartularium Saxonicum. The Domesday Book of 1086 records it as Bocheland. Later spellings include Bochelanda in the 12th century, and Boclonde, Bokeland and Bikeland in the 13th century.

== Manor ==
The earliest known record of Buckland is from 957 in a charter in which King Edgar the Peaceful granted Ælfheah ten hides of land at Buckland. In the reign of Edward the Confessor (1042–1066) Ulvric Chenp held the manor of Buckland. The Domesday Book of 1086 lists Buckland as part of the lands of Bishop Osbern of Gamesfel Hundret (now called Gainfield). However, his right was not established and the case had already been sent before King William the Conqueror. The estate was assessed as eight hides and consisted of a mill, four fisheries and a dairy farm producing 10 wheys of cheese a year. Its value was given as £8.

Hugh de Buckland is recorded as the next holder and occupier of the manor, as well as another estate in Buckland. At the end of the 12th century William de Buckland, probably the great-grandson of Hugh de Buckland, held the manor. He died about 1215 leaving three daughters by his wife Maud de Say as his heirs – Maud d'Avranches, Hawise de Boville and Joan de Ferrers. His Buckland estate passed to Maud, wife of William d'Avranches. They had a son William and daughter Maud d'Avranches. William died childless in 1236, by which time his sister Maud had married Hamo de Crevecoeur.

In 1245, they bestowed the manor on their daughter Agnes and any future heirs. Hamo de Crevecoeur died in 1263, survived by their daughters Agnes, Eleanor and Isabella: Iseult (who had married Nicholas de Lenham) died before her father leaving a son John, aged 12 in 1263. Buckland was assigned to Iseult's portion, to descend to John de Lenham as her heir. In 1263, wardship of the manor of Buckland was granted to Eubold de Montibus, from whom it passed in turn to Philip Bassett until John came of age. In 1267 John de Lenham took possession.

Before 1545 the manor of Buckland was held by the De La Poles, Dukes of Suffolk. In 1545 it passed to the Yate family. In 1690 it passed by marriage to the Throckmortons of Coughton Court in Warwickshire. They went on to build much of the current estate. In the mid-1750s, Sir Robert Throckmorton, 4th Baronet had a new house built, Buckland House. The old manor house became his stables. For the later history of the manor, see Buckland House.

== Manor houses ==
=== Buckland House ===
Buckland House is a large Georgian stately home and the manor house of Buckland. It is a masterpiece of Palladian architecture designed by John Wood, the Younger and built for Sir Robert Throckmorton, 4th Baronet in 1757. From 1963 it was a university college for students taking London external degrees, called University Hall, Buckland. In 2004 it was bought by the motorsport businessman and socialite Paddy McNally.

=== Other manor houses ===
Barcote Manor or Park is a Tudor Revival house built in the 1870s for the writer Lady Theodora Guest by her mother, but she married and went to live elsewhere. She sold it to the millionaire William West, Director of the Great Western Railway, in 1881. It later became a boarding school, the Barcote School of Coaching, and has now been converted into flats. A previous building on the site was the home of the Holcott family from 1230 to 1586.

Buckland Manor House was built about 1580. It was the manor house until 1757, when Buckland House was built. The old house was then converted into stables, and re-faced in Georgian Gothic Revival style with turrets and battlements. In the middle of the 20th century the building was converted back into a private house. Carswell Manor is a gabled house built early in the 17th century for John Southby, who was both JP and MP for Berkshire. Major additions were made in the Victorian period. The Southbys lived here from 1584 to 1892.

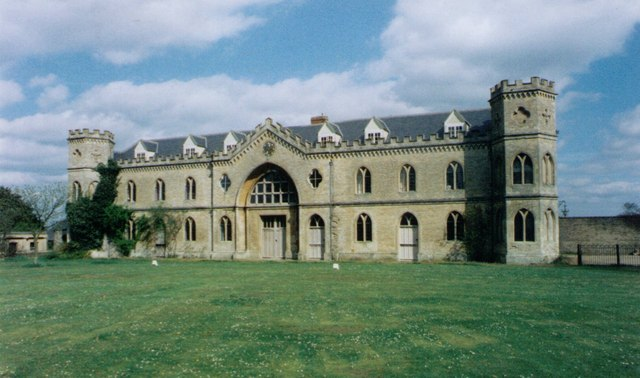
16th-century former Manor House, converted into stables and re-faced in 1757

== Churches ==
=== Church of England ===
The Church of England parish church of St Mary the Virgin is largely a 12th-century building, with a 13th-century chancel, tower and transepts, a 14th-century octagonal baptismal font and some minor Victorian additions. The main north and south nave doors are unusual in having a matching pair of Norman arches. Also in the church is a late 12th-century Crusader chest. In the chancel is a triangular locker containing the heart-burial (1575) of William Holcott of Barcote Manor. He was a staunch Protestant who only just avoided being burnt at the stake by Mary Tudor. After the Reformation, he became a zealous lay preacher, often gracing the pulpit in his "velvet bonnet and damask gown...sometimes with a gold chain".

Other monuments in the church include a number of 14th-century tomb recesses, an inscribed slab with a floriated cross to Dame Felice la Blonde and a number of monuments to the Yates of Buckland Manor, including the brass of John Yate (1578), and hatchments of the Throckmorton family. The Barcote Chapel has a decorative mosaic, made in 1890–92 in memory of Clara Jane, wife of William West, of Barcote Manor. The bell tower had a ring of six bells until 1915, when they were increased to eight by the addition of a new treble and second bell. In 1636 Roger I Purdue of Bristol cast what are now the fourth, fifth, sixth and seventh bells. In 1721 Abraham II Rudhall of Gloucester cast the tenor bell. Mears and Stainbank of the Whitechapel Bell Foundry cast the third bell in 1898 and the new treble and second bell in 1915, and recast the seventh bell in 1960. St Mary's also has a Sanctus bell that John Warner and Sons of Cripplegate cast in 1854. St Mary's church is a Grade I listed building. Its parish is part of the Benefice of Cherbury with Gainfield.

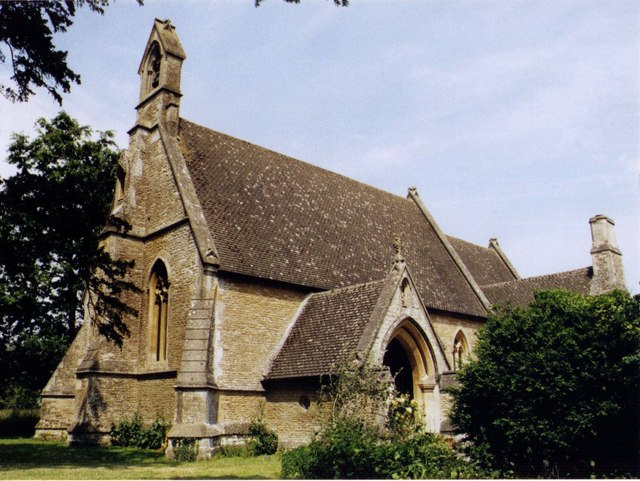
St George's Roman Catholic Church

=== Roman Catholic ===
St George's Roman Catholic Church is a Gothic Revival building, completed in 1848 for the Throckmortons of Buckland House. It has a chancel, north chapel, nave, south porch and western bell gable.

== Other buildings ==
In 1240 an almshouse was founded and stood in a place now called Warnfords. In 1793 Henry Southby of Carswell House founded a free school for boys and girls in Buckland. Others contributed further funds for the school and in 1868 it had an income of £60 per annum, £40 from Henry Southby and £20 from other charities. Buckland has two pubs. The Lamb Inn in the village is a 16th-century building that was extended late in the 19th century. A restaurant was added toward the end of the 20th century. In 2008 the Lamb Inn was owned by Peta and Paul Barnard, former owners of The Plough at Clanfield which won a Michelin star. The Trout Inn is an 18th-century building 1 mile (1.6 km) north of the village, by Tadpole Bridge on the Thames. Buckland had a post office that reported to Faringdon. A photograph sold by a commercial website shows the post office in existence in 1965. The building is now a private home called the Old Post House. The former Draper's shop, built in the 18th century, is now a house called Hedges.

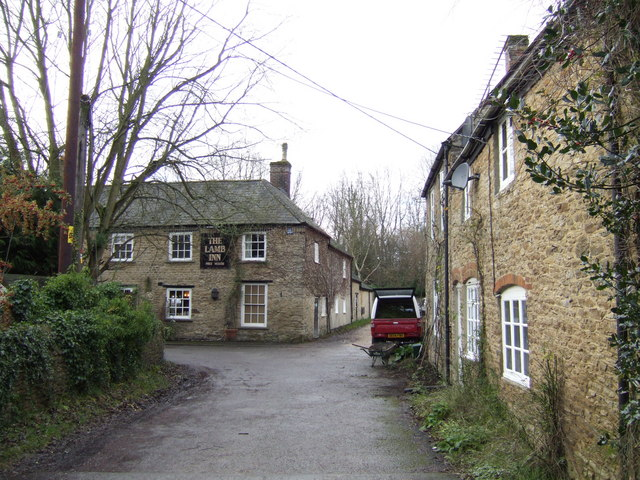
The Lamb Inn

== Statistics ==
=== 19th and 20th century ===
Various sources have been collated by the University of Portsmouth and others to give an insight into Buckland in the 19th and 20th centuries. The information quoted is for the civil parish of Buckland as defined at each period. The earliest published figure for the population of Buckland is from the 1801 Census, which recorded it as 727 people. The population increased until the 1851 Census, which recorded 987 people living in the parish. Thereafter was a decline until the 1901 Census recorded Buckland's population as 665. It varied a little over the next 50 years, and the 1951 Census recorded a decline to 636.

The 2001 Census recorded the population as 553, of whom 292 lived in the village itself. The 1831 Census recorded that 70.7% of the male Buckland population over 20 were working as labourers or servants. 13.3% were small farmers, master and skilled workers. 10.8% were employers and professionals. A more detailed breakdown shows that 54.4% of people were employed as agricultural labourers, 12.9% in retail and handicrafts as well as 8.8% as servants. (Based on 249 males aged 20 and over.) Buckland was a site for the Survey of English Dialects in the 1950s.

== Literature ==
In 1774 Henry James Pye, Poet Laureate to George III, wrote the poem Faringdon Hill. Part of it refers to Buckland:

See Buckland here her lovely scenes display,
which rude erewhile in rich disorder lay
til Taste and Genius with corrective hand
spread Culture's nicest vesture o'er the land,
and called each latent beauty to the fight;
clothed the declining slopes with pendant wood,
and o'er the sedge grown meadows poured the floor.

== Bibliography ==
- Ekwall, Eilert (1960) [1936]. Concise Oxford Dictionary of English Place-Names (4th ed.). Oxford: Oxford University Press. Buckland. ISBN 0198691033.
- Hamilton, NES, ed. (1868). The National Gazetteer of Great Britain and Ireland. London: JS Virtue. Archived from the original on 5 August 2010.
- Loyn, HR (1962). Anglo-Saxon England and the Norman Conquest. Social and Economic History of England. London: Longmans, Green & Co. p. 171.
- Page, WH; Ditchfield, PH, eds. (1924). A History of the County of Berkshire. Victoria County History. Vol. 4. assisted by John Hautenville Cope. London: The St Katherine Press. pp. 453–460.
- Pevsner, Nikolaus (1966). Berkshire. The Buildings of England. Harmondsworth: Penguin Books. pp. 103–106.
- Wilson, John Marius (1870–72). Imperial Gazetteer of England and Wales. Edinburgh: A Fullarton & Co.
- Wright, Andrew SN (1996) [1966]. The History of Buckland in the County of Berkshire. Oxford: Holywell Press.
