= Anne Throckmorton =

English poet

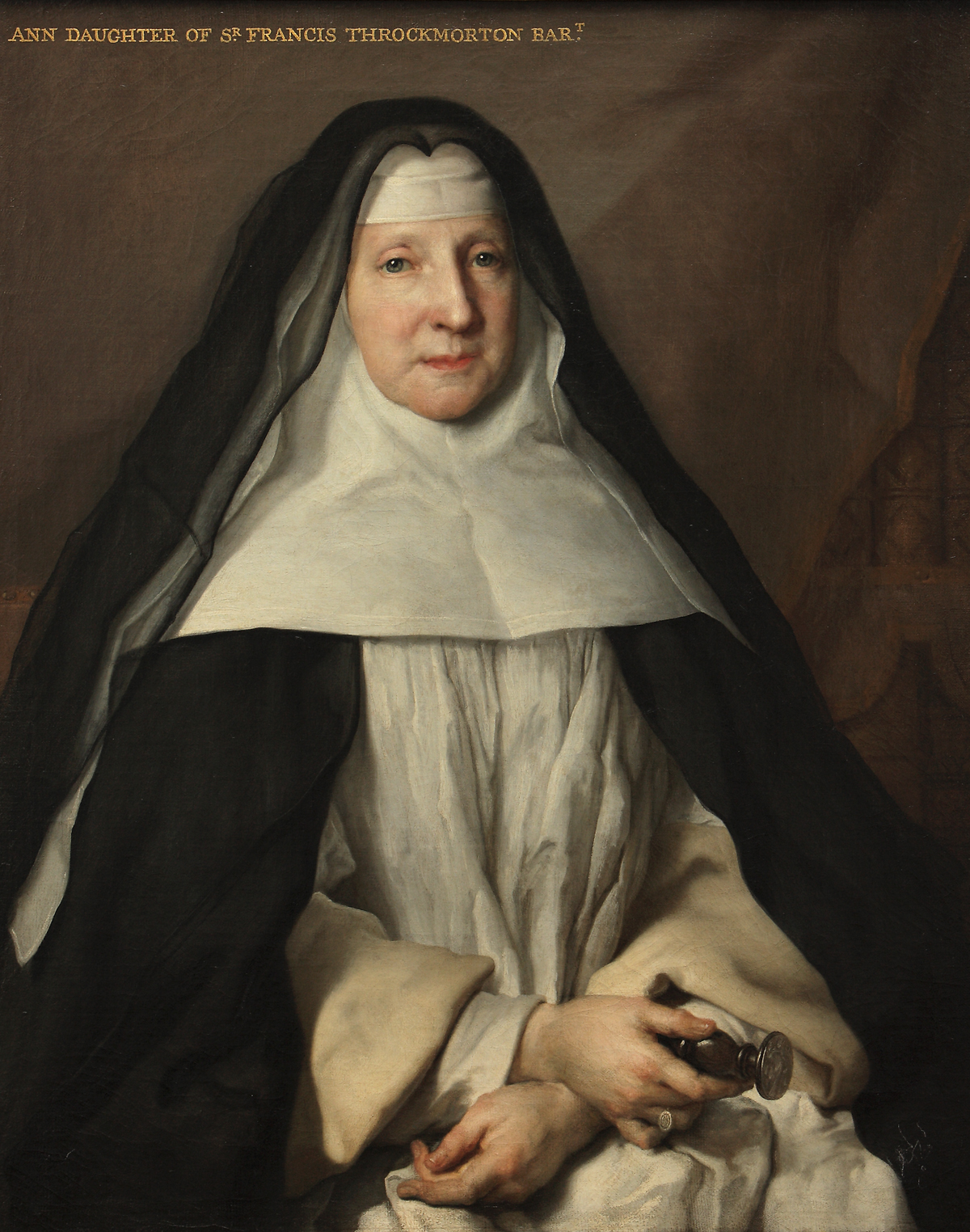
- Portrait by Nicolas de Largillière
- Born: 1664
- Died: 5 June 1734 (aged 69–70); Paris
- Occupation: prioress

Anne Throckmorton or name in religion Anne Frances (1664 – 5 June 1734) was an English poet who was prioress of the Convent of Our Blessed Lady of Syon in Paris from 1720 to 1728.

== Life ==
Throckmorton was born in 1664. She was one of the three daughters of Anne (born Monson) and Sir Francis Throckmorton. She had four brothers and her father was the second baronet of Coughton Court in Warwickshire and her great-aunt was the prioress Margaret Throckmorton of St Monica's convent in Leuven.

She began her education in Paris with the English Blue Nuns in the rue de Charenton. She was there for five years before she was joined by her mother, separated from her husband in 1677, who was to spend the rest of her life with the Blue Nuns. Despite this, her the daughter Anne was professed on 2 July 1687 as an Augustinian nun at another convent on the outskirts of Paris, the Convent of Our Lady of Syon, founded by English expatriate Catholics in 1634.

Anne, now Ann Frances, was a poet and would create long poems as a record. In 1708, when Ann Tyldesley was the prioress, Throckmorton composed verses about St Paul, written in letters of gold to celebrate the prioress' golden jubilee. In that year Anne Frances' niece Elizabeth Throckmorton came to the convent with her six sisters to attend the convent's school.

Anne Frances became prioress of her convent in 1720 and remained in that role until 1728. Having had difficulties with two of her nuns, she banned the entry of any new novices who were Scottish or Irish. In 1729 she sat for her portrait, painted by Nicolas de Largillière. Sir Robert Throckmorton, 4th Baronet, commissioned four paintings from the same artist. One was of his sister, Elizabeth, another was of Anne, another of his cousin Frances Woollascot and a fourth was of himself.

Anne Frances Throckmorton died in Paris on 5 June 1734. Her niece Elizabeth would be elected prioress of the convent in 1736. Largillière's portrait of her remained in the Throckmorton family at Coughton Court where it was placed with the portraits of her sisters. The painting is now owned by the National Trust and the other two paintings are abroad.
