= Clare McLaren-Throckmorton =

Elizabeth Clare McLaren-Throckmorton (née d'Abreu; 18 August 1935 – 31 October 2017), known professionally as Clare Tritton, QC, was a British barrister and descendant of the Throckmorton baronets. She was the tenant of the Throckmorton family's main residence, Coughton Court near Alcester in Warwickshire, England, now owned by the National Trust. She was also the owner of the Molland Estate in North Devon.

== Personal life ==
Clare McLaren-Throckmorton was born as Elizabeth Clare d'Abreu, one of three daughters, of Professor Alphonsus Ligouri d'Abreu (CBE, FRCS), a surgeon, and the former Elizabeth Ursula Arienwen Throckmorton. She has two younger sisters.

== Marriages ==
Clare McLaren-Throckmorton's first marriage was to Alan George Tritton, CBE, DL, of Lyons Hall, Great Leighs, Chelmsford, Essex, formerly director of Barclays Bank, High Sheriff of Essex 1992, CBE June 1999 for services to Anglo-Indial relations & preservation of the cultural heritage. They had three children. That marriage was dissolved.

Another marriage of hers was to John Andrew McLaren (born 2 July 1932 – died 6 January 2007). In order to preserve the Throckmorton family name, she became Mrs. McLaren-Throckmorton.

== Throckmorton Baronets ==
The Throckmorton family were infamous in England for their part in the Throckmorton Plot of 1583 which aimed to assassinate Elizabeth I and replace her with Mary Stuart. They were also "indirectly" involved in the Gunpowder Plot of 1605 through their association with Robert Catesby.

McLaren-Throckmorton was a member of the Throckmorton family via her mother, Elizabeth, the sister of Sir Robert Throckmorton, 11th Baronet. The 10th Baronet, Sir Richard Throckmorton, was her great-grandfather. The 12th and last Baronet, Sir Anthony Throckmorton, died in 1994; thus the title is now extinct.

== Professional life ==
Clare McLaren-Throckmorton trained as a barrister and specialised in European Community Law with a particular interest in competition law. She served on the Monopolies and Mergers Commission and on the Financial Intermediaries, Managers and Brokers Regulatory Association (FIMBRA). She relinquished her non-executive directorship of the Birmingham Royal Ballet Trust Company.

She was a non-executive director of Severn Trent Water, and was also a Trustee Director of some of the company's pension schemes. Furthermore, she was the Chief Executive of Throckmorton Estates, the organisation which controls the Throckmorton family's assets, including the Molland Estate in North Devon. This does not include Coughton Court in Warwickshire, which is owned by the National Trust, although the grounds are managed by Throckmorton Estates.

She died surrounded by her family 31 October 2017 at the age of 82.
