= Thomas Eversfield =

English politician (1614-1649)

Sir Thomas Eversfield (1614–1649) was an English politician who sat in the House of Commons of England from 1640 to 1644. He supported the Royalist side in the English Civil War.

Eversfield was the son of John Eversfield of Hollington, East Sussex. His father and three brothers were also Members of Parliament for Hastings.

Parliament of England
Preceded by Sir John Baker, 2nd Baronet; Robert Reed	Member of Parliament for Hastings; 1640–1644; With: John Ashburnham	Succeeded by Roger Gratwick; Sir John Pelham, 3rd Baronet
