= Gainfield =

Coordinates: 51.658°N 1.497°W

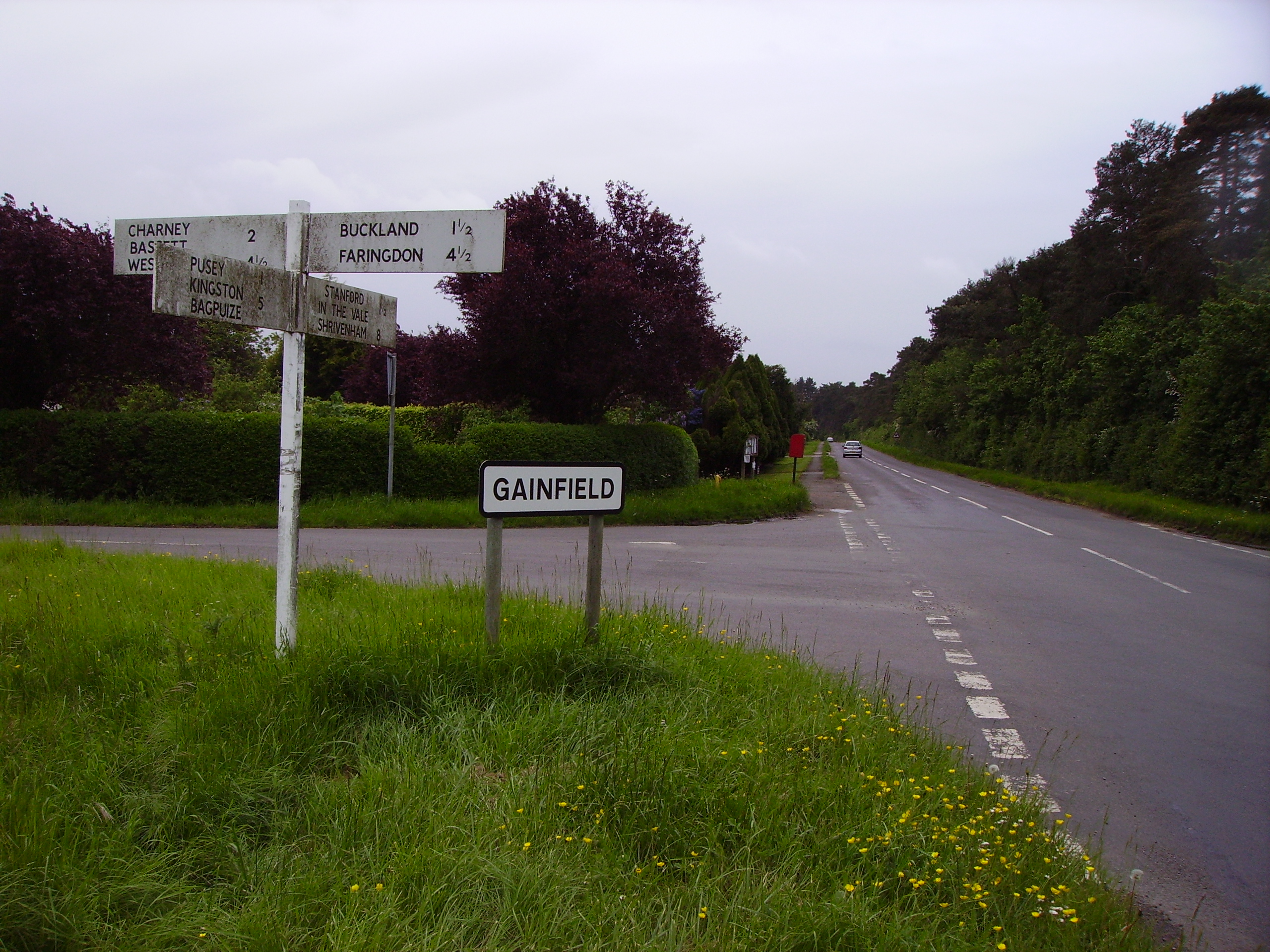
- Gainfield crossroads, with the Warren on the right of the picture

- Location within Oxfordshire
- OS grid reference: SU3495
- Civil parish: Buckland
- District: Vale of White Horse
- Shire county: Oxfordshire
- Region: South East
- Country: England
- Sovereign state: United Kingdom
- Post town: Faringdon
- Postcode district: SN7
- Dialling code: 01367
- Police: Thames Valley
- Fire: Oxfordshire
- Ambulance: South Central
- UK Parliament: Witney

Gainfield is a small ribbon development in Buckland civil parish about 4 miles (6.4 km) east of Faringdon in the Vale of the White Horse District of England. It was part of Berkshire until the 1974 boundary changes transferred it to Oxfordshire. Buckland is on the B4508 road by the crossroads with the road between Buckland and Charney Bassett, about 1.5 miles (2.4 km) north of Stanford in the Vale. It is opposite a wood called Buckland Warren. There is a legend, linked with that of nearby Cherbury Camp, that tells of the land being given as a reward to a young shepherd boy who saved the inhabitants of the camp by his vigilance. Gainfield is a modern settlement, developed in the late 20th century on lands belonging to Gainfield Farm. Gainfield Farm appears to represent the meeting place of the hundred of Ganfield, one of the ancient hundreds of Berkshire, known to have been in the parish of Buckland.
