= Elizabeth Throckmorton (prioress) =

French nun (1694–1760)

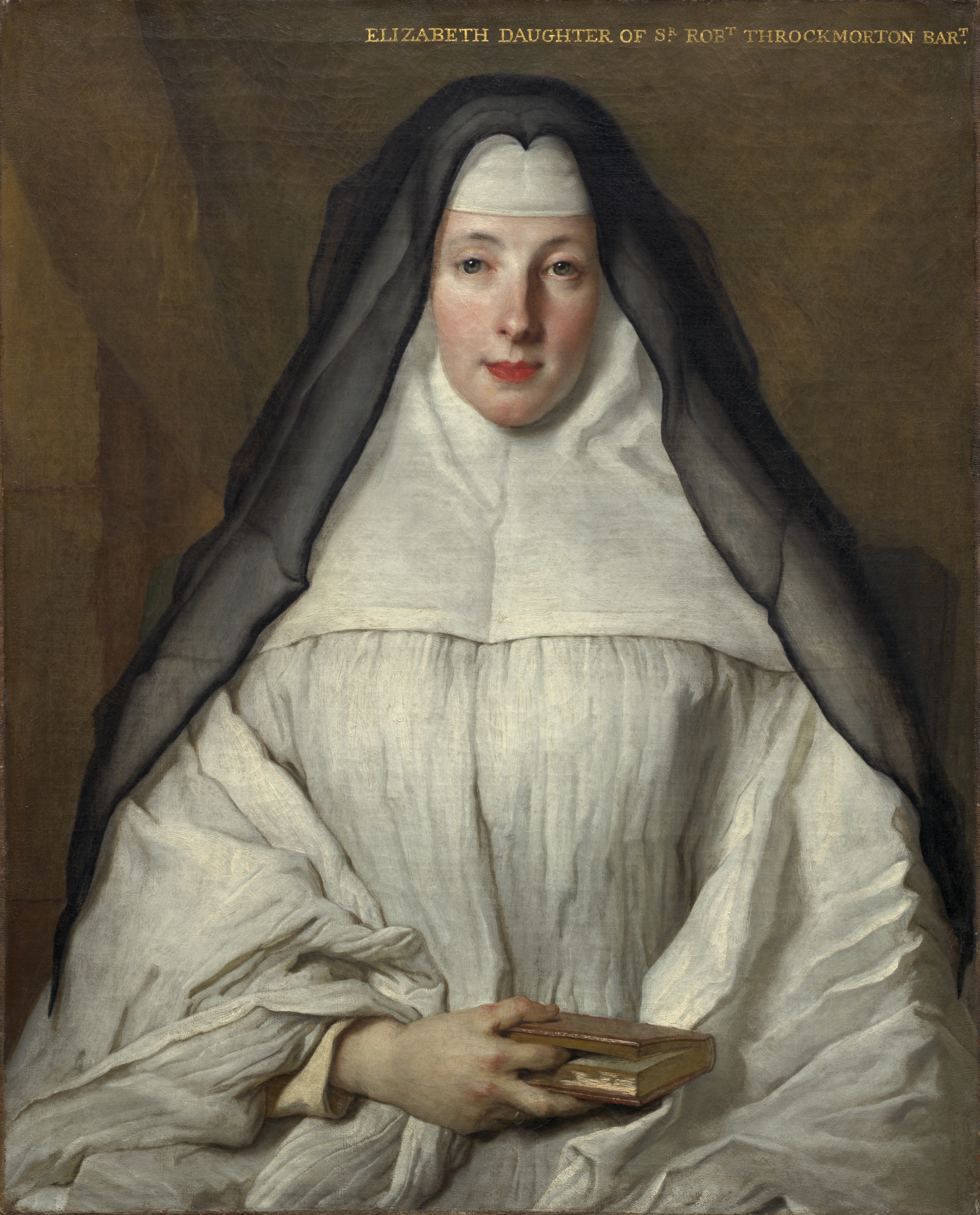
- by Nicolas de Largillière in 1729
- Born: 1694
- Died: April 4, 1760 (aged 65–66); Paris
- Known for: Prioress in Paris
- Relatives: Sir Robert Throckmorton, 4th Baronet (brother)

Elizabeth Throckmorton whose religious name was Elizabeth Teresa Pulcheria (1694 – April 4, 1760) was an Englishwoman who served as prioress of the Convent of Our Blessed Lady of Syon in Paris.

== Life ==
Throckmorton was born in 1694. She was one of the eleven children of Lady Mary (born Yate) and Sir Robert Throckmorton (1662–1721), third baronet, of Coughton Court in Warwickshire.

She suffered from "the King's Evil" or scrofula (Mycobacterial cervical lymphadenitis). This was believed to be treatable by touching the King. She chose to meet and touch the Old Pretender at St Germain en Laye in the hope of relief in 1704.

In 1708 she was sent to school at the Sion convent in Paris, but that was where most of her family were. Her six sisters were there, her aunt Anne Throckmorton was a nun, and their grandmother, another Anne Throckmorton, had taken rooms at the convent. She and her sister Catherine were clothed at the convent on 29 August 1713 and Elizabeth was professed the following year. She was given an annuity by the Throckmorton family to become a nun. Her family's influence ensured that she did not have to carry out all of the tasks expected of a nun.

She was elected prioress for the first time in 1736 and served for the usual eight year term. After that she served as procuratrix until 1752, when she was reelected prioress, remaining in office till her death at the convent on 4 April 1760. She was buried in the nuns' chapel there, under a black marble cover.

== Legacy ==
Her psalter is at Coughton Court and it includes annotations containing mnemonics. In 1729 her brother Sir Robert Throckmorton, 4th Baronet, commissioned four paintings from Nicolas de Largillière. One was of Elizabeth, another was of Anne Throckmorton, another of his cousin Frances Woollascot and the last was of himself. All the portraits would have been together, but Elizabeth's portrait is in the collection of the American National Gallery of Art in Washington DC.
