= Margaret Throckmorton =

English prioress

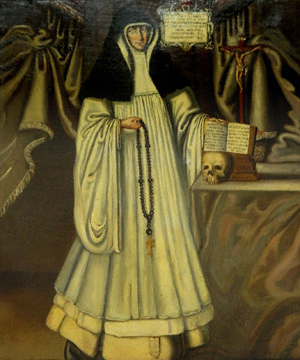
- Painting recording her reelection in 1636
- Born: 1591; Coughton Court
- Died: 26 October 1668 (aged 76–77); Leuven
- Other names: Magdelan (religious name)
- Occupations: nun and prioress
- Known for: prioress in Leuven in Flanders
- Predecessor: Jane Wiseman
- Successor: Mary Thimelby

Margaret Throckmorton, later Magdelan (religious name) (1591 – 26 October 1668) was an English prioress of St Monica's convent in Leuven. It was one of seven religious communities on the continent of English nuns escaping discrimination in England.

== Life ==
Throckmorton was born in Coughton Court in 1591. She was one of the nine children of Agnes (born Wilford) and John Throckmorton. Her father died when she was about five.

Having taken the religious name Magdalen, she was professed as an Augustinian choir nun on 5 August 1613.

She became the prioress of St Monica's in Leuven, a community which her family assisted financially. Her election was not unanimous and she was initially elected for just three years. However her term of office was extended in 1636 and commemorated with a painting. She was eventually appointed for life in 1639. St Monica's was one of seven religious communities on the mainland Europe at the time for English nuns forced to escape discrimination in England. Until 1640, the convent employed the musician John Boult as their chaplain and organist. Boult had been a musician in the service of Queen Elizabeth I and had been with Margaret Throckmorton when she was professed in 1613.

As prioress, she kept the convent solvent by taking in women who wanted to be nuns only if they could bring a good dowry. She had to ride out the plague. In 1636, when Leuven came under siege, she arranged for half the nuns to take temporary refuge elsewhere.

Throckmorton died of erysipelas in Leuven on 26 October 1668, and Mary Thimbleby was unanimously elected to succeed her as prioress. At the time, there were 36 nuns. The new prioress was a notable letter-writer.
