= Sir Robert Throckmorton, 1st Baronet =

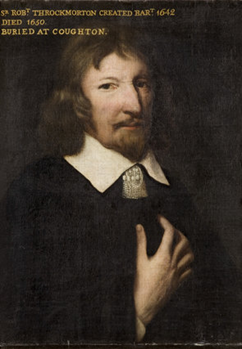
Sr. Rob.t Throckmorton created Bart. 1642 Died 1650 Buried at Coughton. Sir Robert Throckmorton, 1st Baronet, (1599–1650). By unknown artist, 17th-century English. Throckmorton Collection, Coughton Court, Warwickshire. Property of the National Trust, NTPL ref. no. 153578

Sir Robert Throckmorton, 1st Baronet (1599–1650) was created a baronet, of Coughton, co. Warwick, on 1 September 1642.

== Origins ==
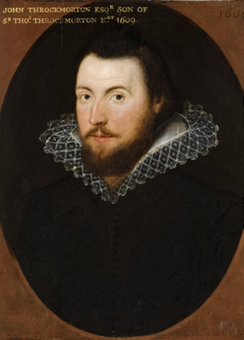
John Throckmorton Esq.r son of Sr. Thos. Throckmorton Knt. 1609. John Throckmorton, Esq., floruit 1609, father of Sir Robert Throckmorton, 1st Baronet (1599–1650). Unknown artist, English, dated 1609. Throckmorton Collection, Coughton Court, Warwickshire. Property of the National Trust, NTPL ref. no. 153609

He was the eldest son of John Throckmorton Esq. (1580-1614/15) by Agnes Wilford, and younger brother of prioress Margaret Throckmorton. John's grandfather was Sir Robert Throckmorton, KG (1513-1581), of Coughton Court, Warwickshire, and of Weston Underwood, Buckinghamshire, who unlike his brothers during the Reformation, one of whom, Job Throckmorton, became a puritan, adhered to the Roman Catholic faith, which religion was persisted in by his descendants until the 20th century.

== Marriage ==
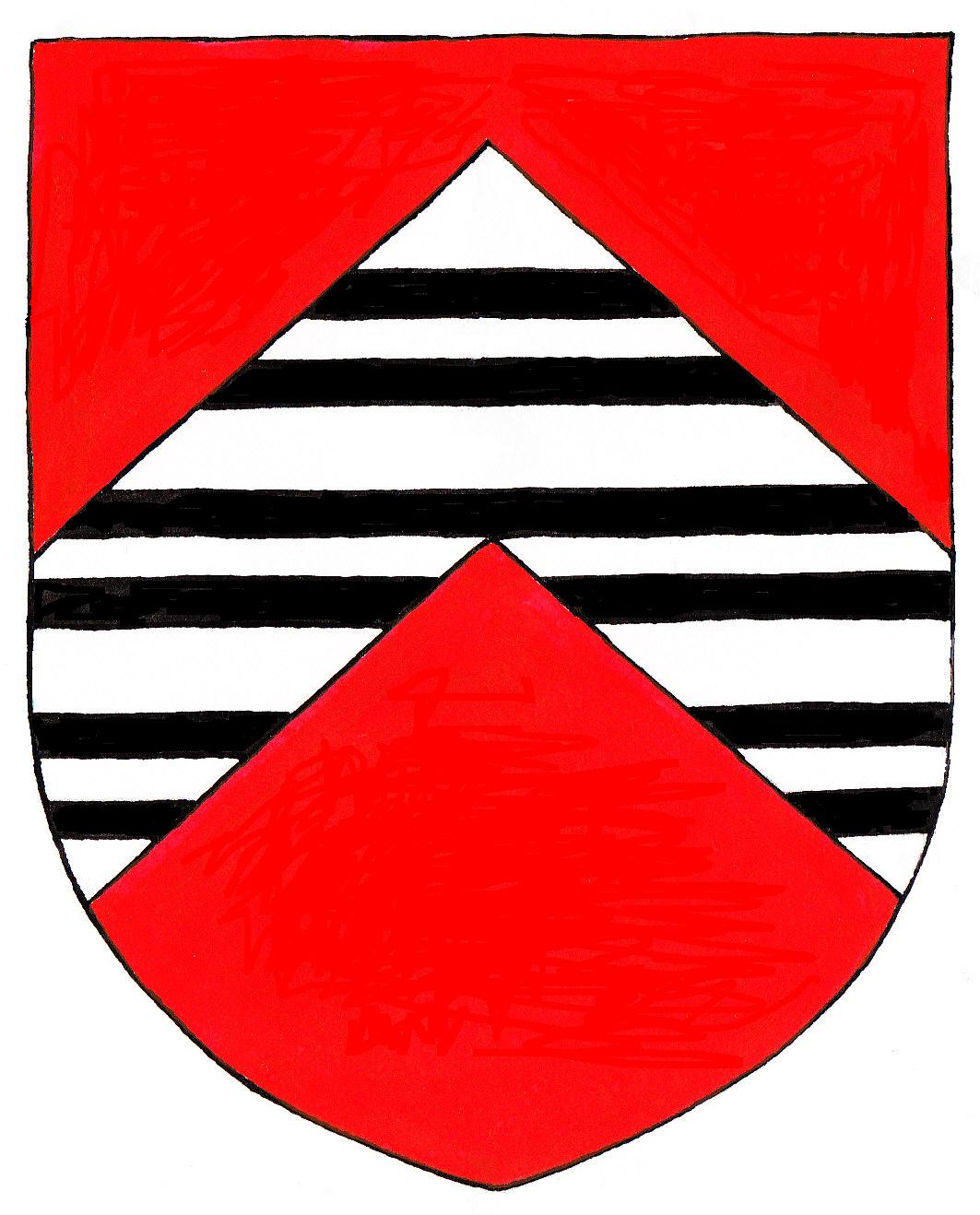
Arms of Throckmorton: Gules, on a chevron argent three bars gemelles sable. Crest: A falcon rising proper belled and jessed or. Mottos: (1): Virtus Sola Nobilitas (Virtue is the only nobility); (2): Moribus Antiquis (With ancient manners)

He married twice:

- Firstly to Dorothy Fortescue, daughter of Francis Fortescue of Salden, Buckinghamshire, and granddaughter of John Fortescue of Salden, Chancellor of the Exchequer.
- Secondly to Mary Smyth, daughter of Sir Francis Smyth (died 1629) of Ashby Folville and Queensborough in Leicestershire and of Wootton Wawen in Warwickshire, by Anne Markham. Mary was sister to Charles Smyth, 1st Viscount Carrington (1598–1665).

== Progeny ==
By his second wife Mary Smyth he had the following issue:

- Anne Throckmorton
- Sir Francis Throckmorton, 2nd Baronet (1641-1680)

== Death ==
He died on 16 January 1650 and was buried at Coughton Court.

== Sources ==
- thePeerage.com, Throckmorton

Baronetage of England
New creation	Baronet (of Coughton); 1642 – 1650	Succeeded by Francis Throckmorton
