= Baker Baronets of Sissinghurst (1611) =

Baker baronets
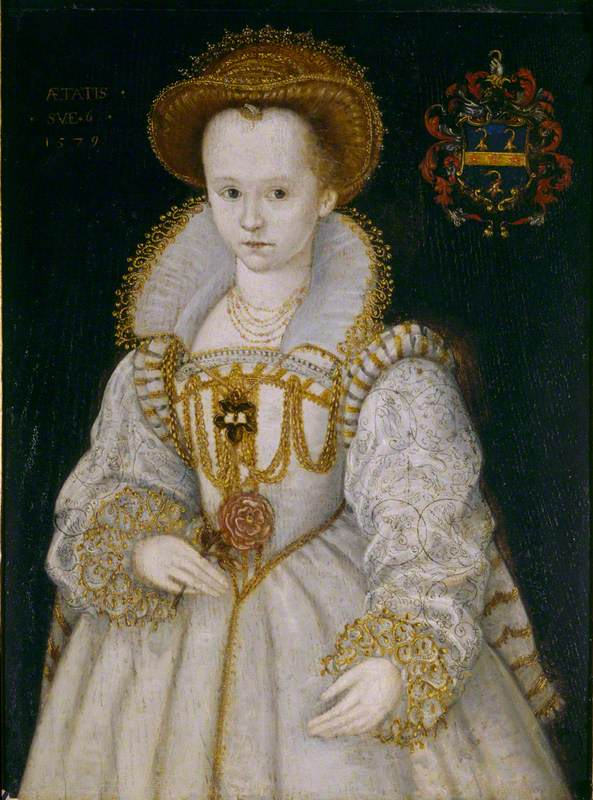
- Chrysogona Baker, aged 6, with the coat of arms of the Baker baronets of Sissinghurst
- Creation date: 1611
- Status: extinct
- Extinction date: 1661

The Baker baronetcy was created in the Baronetage of England on 29 June 1611 for Henry Baker of Sissinghurst Castle, grandson of Sir Richard Baker. The second Baronet served as High Sheriff of Kent in 1635. The Baronetcy was extinct on the death of the third Baronet in 1661.

== Baker of Sissinghurst, Kent (1611) ==
- Sir Henry Baker, 1st Baronet (c. 1587–1623)
- Sir John Baker, 2nd Baronet (c.1608–1653)
- Sir John Baker, 3rd Baronet (died 1661), extinct.

== Early family history ==
A family with the surname of Baker settled in Kent at Cranbrooke in the 14th century. In 1480 Sir John Baker (1488–1558), Attorney General, Speaker of the House of Commons and Chancellor of the Exchequer, acquired an estate at Sissinghurst where his son Richard Baker (1528–1574) built Sissinghurst Castle. A grandson of Sir John was Richard Baker (chronicler).

Baronetage of England
Preceded by Morrison baronets	Baker baronets 29 June 1611	Succeeded by Appleton baronets
