= Yate baronets =

Extinct baronetcy in the Baronetage of the United Kingdom

Two baronetcies created for individuals with the surname Yate, one in the Baronetage of England and the other in the Baronetage of the United Kingdom. Both are now extinct.

The Yate Baronetcy, of Buckland in the County of Berkshire, was created in the Baronetage of England on 30 July 1622 for Edward Yate. The title became extinct upon the death of the fourth Baronet in 1690, and the Buckland estate passed to his sister, Mary Yate, who was married to Sir Robert Throckmorton, 3rd Baronet.

The Yate Baronetcy, of Madeley Hall in the County of Shropshire, was created in the Baronetage of the United Kingdom on 31 January 1921 for the colonial administrator and Conservative politician Charles Yate. His only son predeceased him and the title became extinct upon Yate's death in 1940.

== Yate baronets, of Buckland (1622) ==
Escutcheon of the Yate baronets of Buckland

- Sir Edward Yate, 1st Baronet (died c. 1645)
- Sir John Yate, 2nd Baronet (died c. 1658)
- Sir Charles Yate, 3rd Baronet (died c. 1680)
- Sir John Yate, 4th Baronet (died 1690)

== Yate baronets, of Madeley Hall (1921) ==
- Sir Charles Edward Yate, 1st Baronet (1849–1940)
