= Throckmorton baronets =

Extinct baronetcy in the Baronetage of England

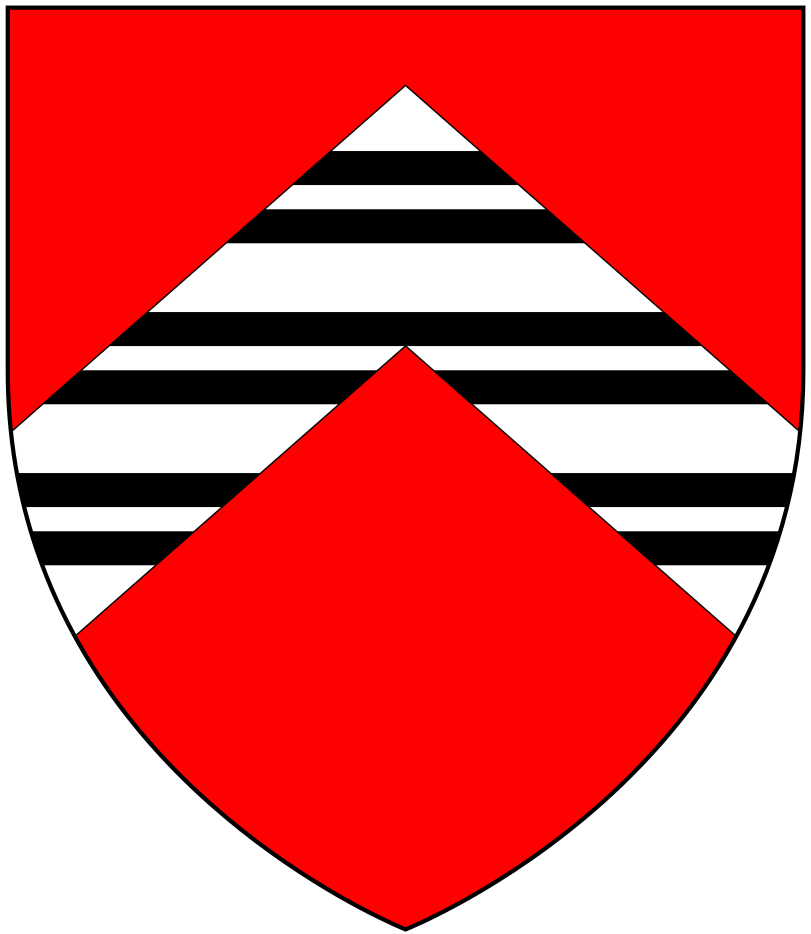
Arms of Throckmorton: Gules, on a chevron argent three bars gemelles sable. Crest: A falcon rising proper belled and jessed or. Mottos: (1): Virtus Sola Nobilitas (Virtue is the only nobility); (2): Moribus Antiquis (With ancient manners)

There have been two baronetcies created for different branches of the Throckmorton family, 6th cousins, both descended from Sir John Throckmorton (died 1445), Under-Treasurer of England temp. King Henry VI (1422–1461). Both titles, which were in the Baronetage of England, are now extinct. The Throckmortons, originally of Throckmorton near Pershore, Worcestershire, trace their history back to the 12th century. In 1409 Sir John de Throckmorton, Under-Treasurer of England, married Eleanor Spinney (or Spiney or Spinetti or de la Spine), daughter and heiress of Guy Spinney of Coughton, Warwickshire, where the senior branch of the family, which bore the junior baronetcy, became established. The Coughton estate included in 1968 a dower house named "Spiney House, Coughton", named after that family. The senior Throckmorton Baronetcy, of Tortworth in the County of Gloucester, was created in the Baronetage of England on 29 June 1611 for William Throckmorton (died 1628), of Coss Court, Tortworth, Gloucestershire, sixth in descent from John Throckmorton, younger son of Sir John Throckmorton, Under-Treasurer of England. The third Baronet sat as Member of Parliament for Gloucestershire and Wotton Basset. The title became extinct on the death of the fourth Baronet in a duel in 1682.

The junior Throckmorton Baronetcy, of Coughton in the County of Warwick, was created in the Baronetage of England on 1 September 1642 for Robert Throckmorton (died 1650), of Coughton Court, near Alcester, Warwickshire, sixth in descent from Thomas Throckmorton of Coughton, eldest son of Sir John Throckmorton, Under-Treasurer of England. Elizabeth Throckmorton was the wife of Sir Walter Raleigh. Members of the family were involved in or connected with the Throckmorton Plot of 1583 and the Gunpowder Plot of 1605. Although Royalist sympathisers during the Civil War the family was one of very few recusant families to survive the turbulent 16th and 17th centuries with their estates intact. The sixth Baronet assumed the additional surname of Courtenay in 1792 on inheriting the Courtenay estates of Molland, Devon, through his mother. However, none of his successors have used this surname. The eighth Baronet was Member of Parliament for Berkshire. The title became extinct on the death of the 12th Baronet in 1994. However, the Throckmorton family is still resident at Coughton Court as tenants of the National Trust.

== Throckmorton baronets, of Tortworth (1611) ==
- Sir William Throckmorton, 1st Baronet (c. 1579–1628)
- Sir Baynham Throckmorton, 2nd Baronet (c. 1606–1664)
- Sir Baynham Throckmorton, 3rd Baronet (c. 1628–c. 1681)
- Sir William Throckmorton, 4th and last Baronet (1658–1682)

== Throckmorton baronets, of Coughton (1642) ==
- Sir Robert Throckmorton, 1st Baronet (died 1650)
- Sir Francis Throckmorton, 2nd Baronet (1641–1680)
- Sir Robert Throckmorton, 3rd Baronet (1662–1720)
- Sir Robert Throckmorton, 4th Baronet (1702–1791)
- Sir John Courtenay Throckmorton, 5th Baronet (1754–1819)
- Sir George Courtenay Throckmorton, 6th Baronet (1754–1826)
- Sir Charles Throckmorton, 7th Baronet (1757–1840)
- Sir Robert George Throckmorton, 8th Baronet (1800–1862)
- Sir Nicholas William George Throckmorton, 9th Baronet (1838–1919)
- Sir Richard Charles Acton Throckmorton, 10th Baronet (1839–1927)
- Sir Robert George Maxwell Throckmorton, 11th Baronet (1908–1989)
- Sir Anthony John Benedict Throckmorton, 12th and last Baronet (1916–1994)

== Other notable family members ==
- Elizabeth Hussey, Baroness Hungerford (c. 1510 – 1554)
- Francis Throckmorton (1554–1584)
- Nicholas Throckmorton (1515–1571)
- John Throckmorton (1524–1580)
- Raquel A. Throckmorton/Harris (1970-)
- Peter Throckmorton (1928–1990)

== Notes ==
Baronetage of England
Preceded by Wynn baronets	Throckmorton baronets 29 June 1611	Succeeded by Worsley baronets
