= Coughton Court =

Historic house museum in Stratford-on-Avon, United Kingdom

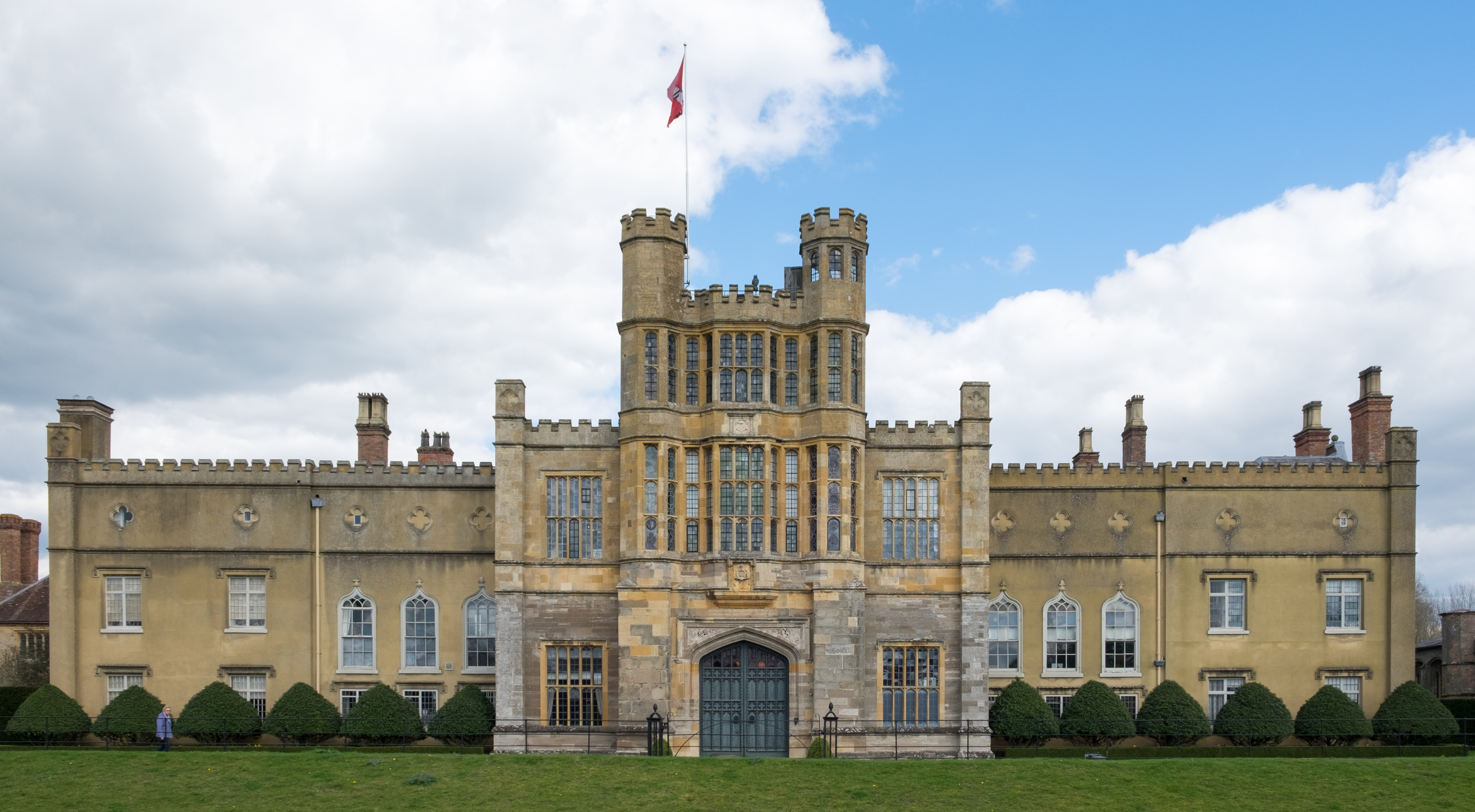
- West front
- Interactive map of Coughton Court
- 52.24362°N 1.87959°W
- Type: Stately home
- Location: Coughton, Warwickshire, England
- OS grid reference: SP080604

History
- Built: 16th century

Site notes
- Owner: Throckmorton Baronets
- Website: https://www.coughtoncourt.co.uk/

Listed Building – Grade I
- Official name: Coughton Court
- Designated: 10 February 1956
- Reference no.: 1183632

Listed Building – Grade II*
- Official name: Coughton Court Stables/Coughton Galleries
- Designated: 1 February 1967
- Reference no.: 1355379

Listed Building – Grade II
- Official name: Coughton Court Stables Coach House
- Designated: 21 June 1985
- Reference no.: 1300475

Scheduled monument
- Official name: Medieval settlement at Coughton Court
- Designated: 7 July 1999
- Reference no.: 1017171

Coughton Court (/ˈkoʊtən/) is an English Tudor country house, situated on the main road between Studley and Alcester in Warwickshire. It is a Grade I listed building.

The house has a long crenellated façade directly facing the main road, at the centre of which is the Tudor Gatehouse, dating from after 1536; this has hexagonal turrets and oriel windows in the English Renaissance style. The Gatehouse is the oldest part of the house and is flanked by later wings, in the Strawberry Hill Gothic style, popularised by Horace Walpole.

== History ==
The Coughton estate has been owned by the Throckmorton family since 1409. The estate was acquired through marriage to the De Spinney family. Coughton was rebuilt by Sir George Throckmorton, the first son of Sir Robert Throckmorton of Coughton Court by Catherine Marrow, daughter of William Marrow of London. The great gatehouse was dedicated to King Henry VIII by Throckmorton, a favourite of the King who spent most of his life rebuilding Coughton. Throckmorton would become notorious due to his almost fatal involvement in the divorce between King Henry and his first wife Catherine of Aragon. He favoured the Queen and was against the English Reformation. In 1549, when he was planning the windows in the great hall, he asked his son Nicholas to obtain from the heralds the correct tricking (colour abbreviations) of the arms of his ancestors' wives and his own cousin and niece by marriage Queen Catherine Parr (see gallery drawing). The costly recusancy (refusal to attend Anglican Church services) of his eldest son, Robert, and his heirs restricted later rebuilding, so that much of the house still stands largely as he left it.

After Throckmorton's death in 1552, Coughton passed to his eldest son, Robert. The family were practicing Catholics and the house contains a priest hole, although unlikely to be the work of Nicholas Owen. These were hiding places for priests constructed during the period when Catholics were persecuted by law in England, from the middle of the reign of Elizabeth I. The Hall also holds a place in English history for its roles in both the Throckmorton Plot of 1583 to murder Queen Elizabeth, and the Gunpowder Plot of 1605, although the Throckmorton family were themselves only indirectly implicated in the latter, when some of the Gunpowder conspirators rode directly there after its discovery.

The house has been in the ownership of the National Trust since 1946. The family, however, hold a 300-year lease. The family tenant was Clare McLaren-Throckmorton, known professionally as Clare Tritton QC, until she died on 31 October 2017. The current residents are Magnus and Imogen Birch Throckmorton.

In Autumn 2023 a £3.3 million roof restoration roof project began, with key sections of the roof being restored and structural improvements made to the fabric of the house. The work was funded by the Wolfson Foundation and donations from National Trust members and supporters. Phase 4 of the work, over the winter months, was scheduled to fit around the annual migration of the resident bats. The work was completed in the summer of 2025.

The property is set in extensive grounds including a walled formal garden, a river and a lake. The house is open to the public but not all year round. The National Trust managed the property from 2005 until 2026, when the Throckmorton family resumed management. The National Trust continue to own and maintain the property. Following the restoration National Trust members expressed disappointment over the decision to hand back management of the property to the residing family. The change in management caused public concern that the family would benefit from money spent by the trust on repair works, with National Trust members only able to visit on ten days in a year as part of their membership. The management agreement is renewed every 10 years.

== Architecture ==
The gatehouse at Coughton was built at the earliest in 1536, as it is built of stones which came from Bordesley Abbey and Evesham Abbey(both in Worcestershire) after the Dissolution of the Monasteries Act in 1536. As with other Tudor houses, it was built around a courtyard, with the gatehouse used for deliveries and coaches to travel through to the courtyard. Geoffrey Tyack described the gatehouse as a "dazzling monument to family pride, and the angle turrets, large expanses of window and battlemented skyline combine to give an impression of chivalrous splendour". The gatehouse has oriel windows in the English Renaissance style and is flanked by later wings, in the Strawberry Hill Gothic style, popularised by Horace Walpole. One of the tower turrets contains the priest hole, two secret spaces, one above the other, which were rediscovered in 1858 and still contained a rope-ladder used for access. The courtyard was enclosed on all four sides until 1780, when the east range opposite the gatehouse was demolished.

After the Roman Catholic Relief Act was passed in 1829, the Throckmorton family were able to afford large-scale building works, allowing them to remodel the west front.

== In popular culture ==
The house was used as a filming location for the BBC One series Father Brown in the episode The Mask of the Demon.

In June 2025 the restoration of the house's roof was featured in an episode of BBC's series Hidden Treasures of the National Trust. This included the relocation for restoration of the Tabula Eliensis (1596), a large oil-on-linen painting depicting the history of Ely Cathedral and the coats of arms of 29 Catholic noblemen imprisoned by Elizabeth I.

== Gallery ==
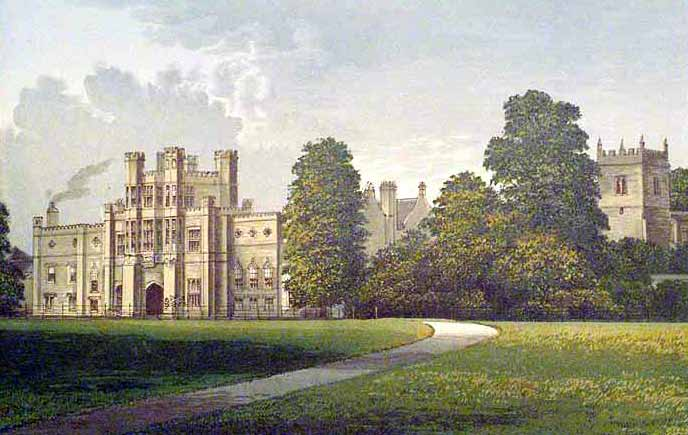
Coughton Court in the late 19th century

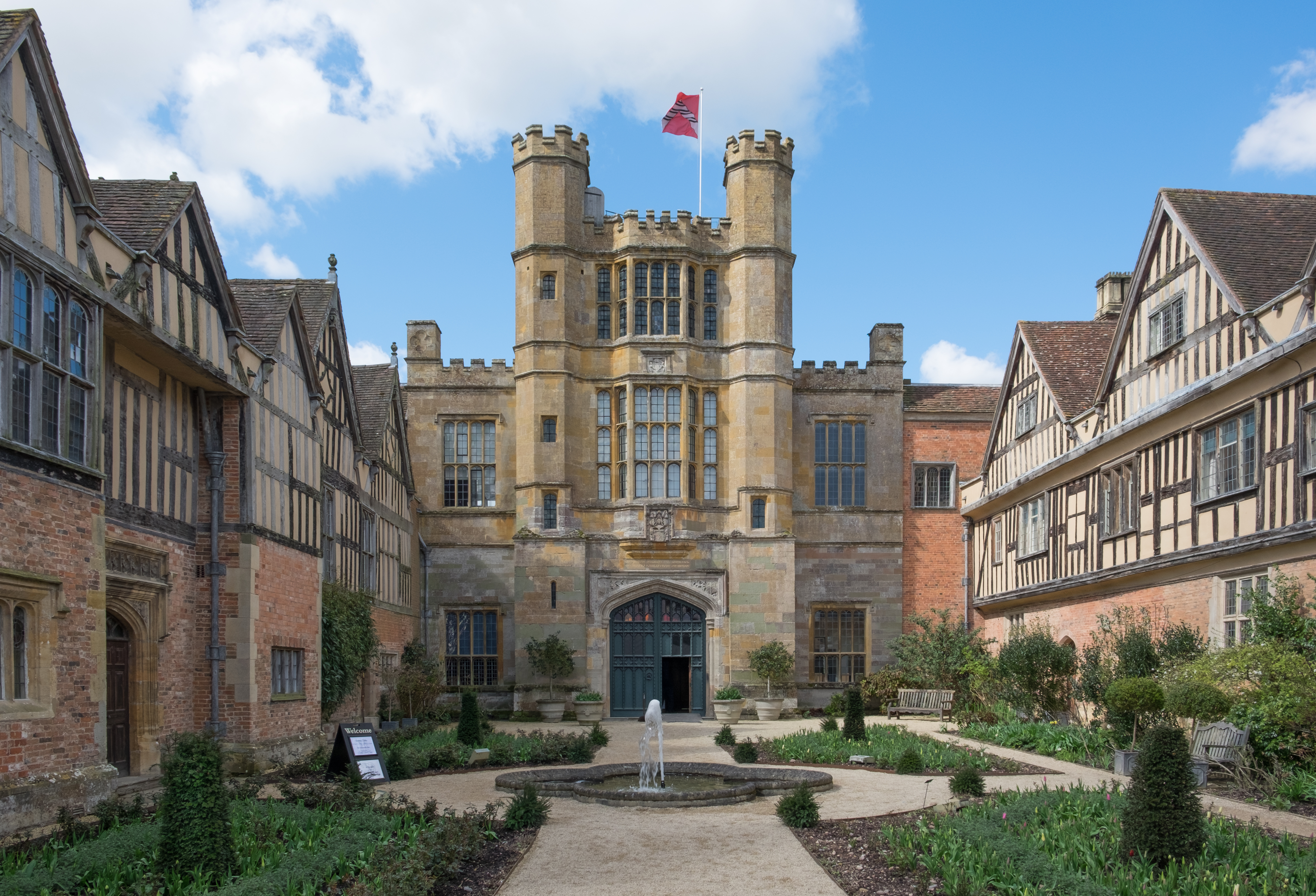
Coughton Court courtyard

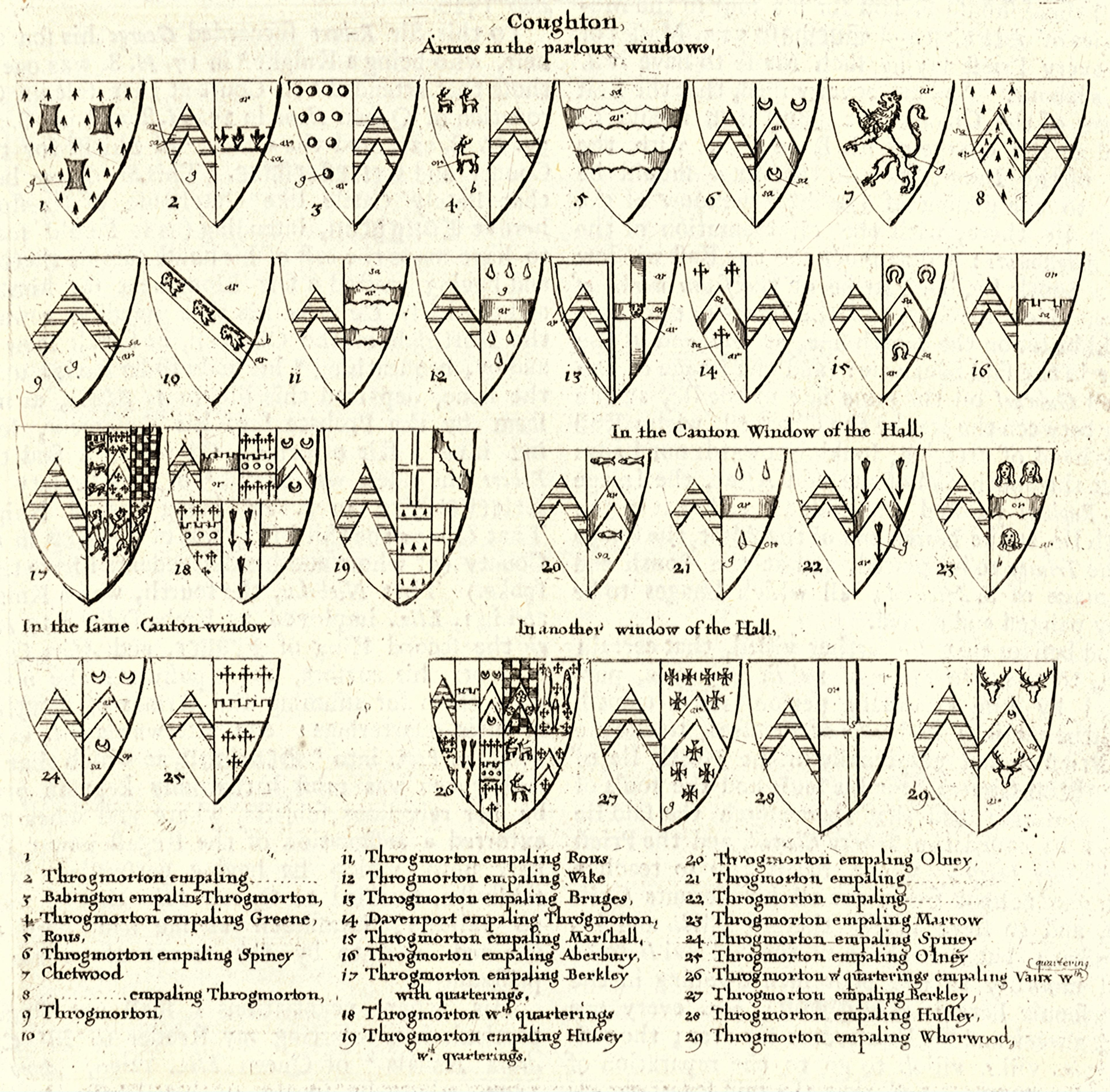
Armorials depicted in windows of Coughton Court, by Wenceslaus Hollar (d. 1677)

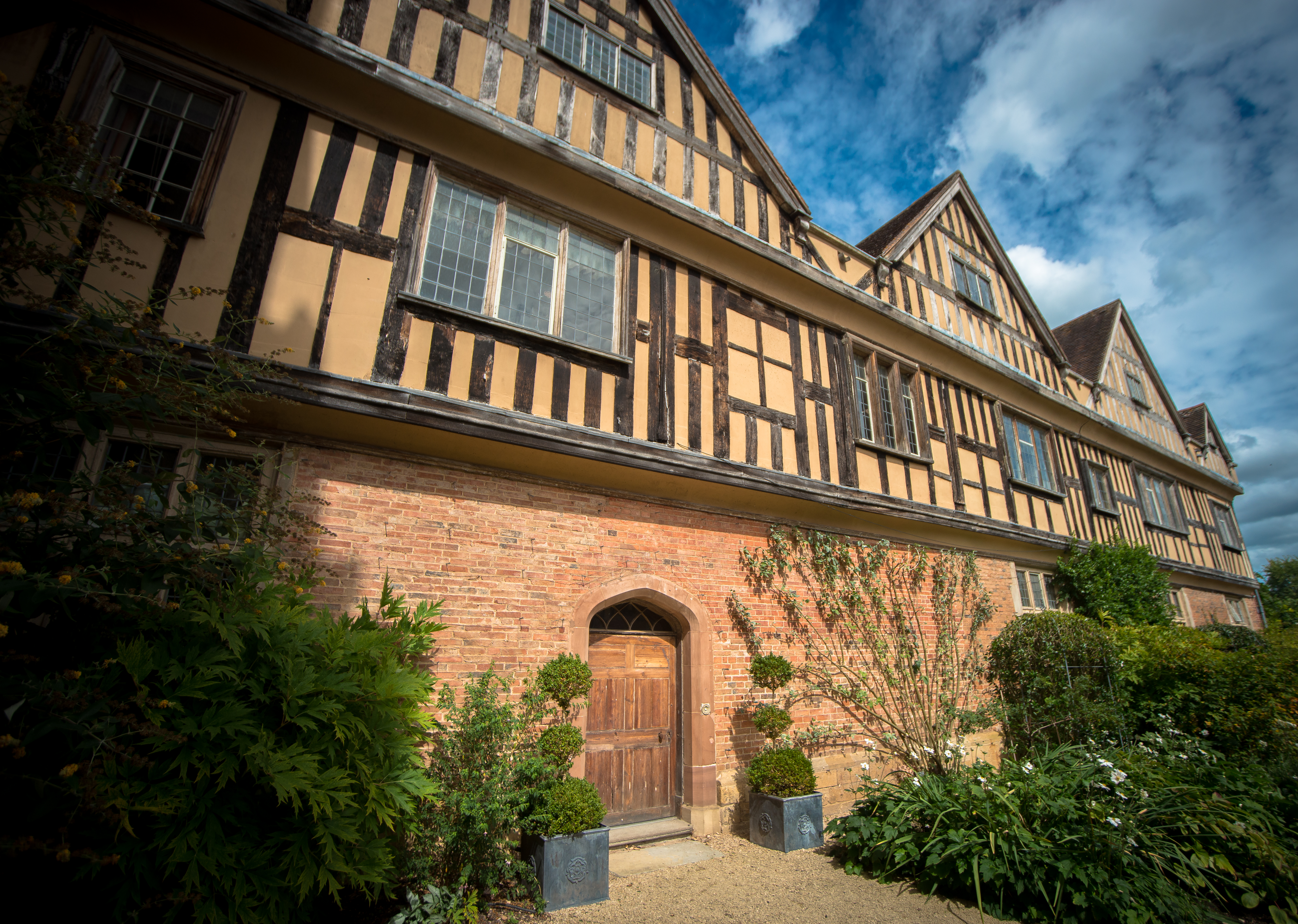
Old Buildings in Coughton Courtyard

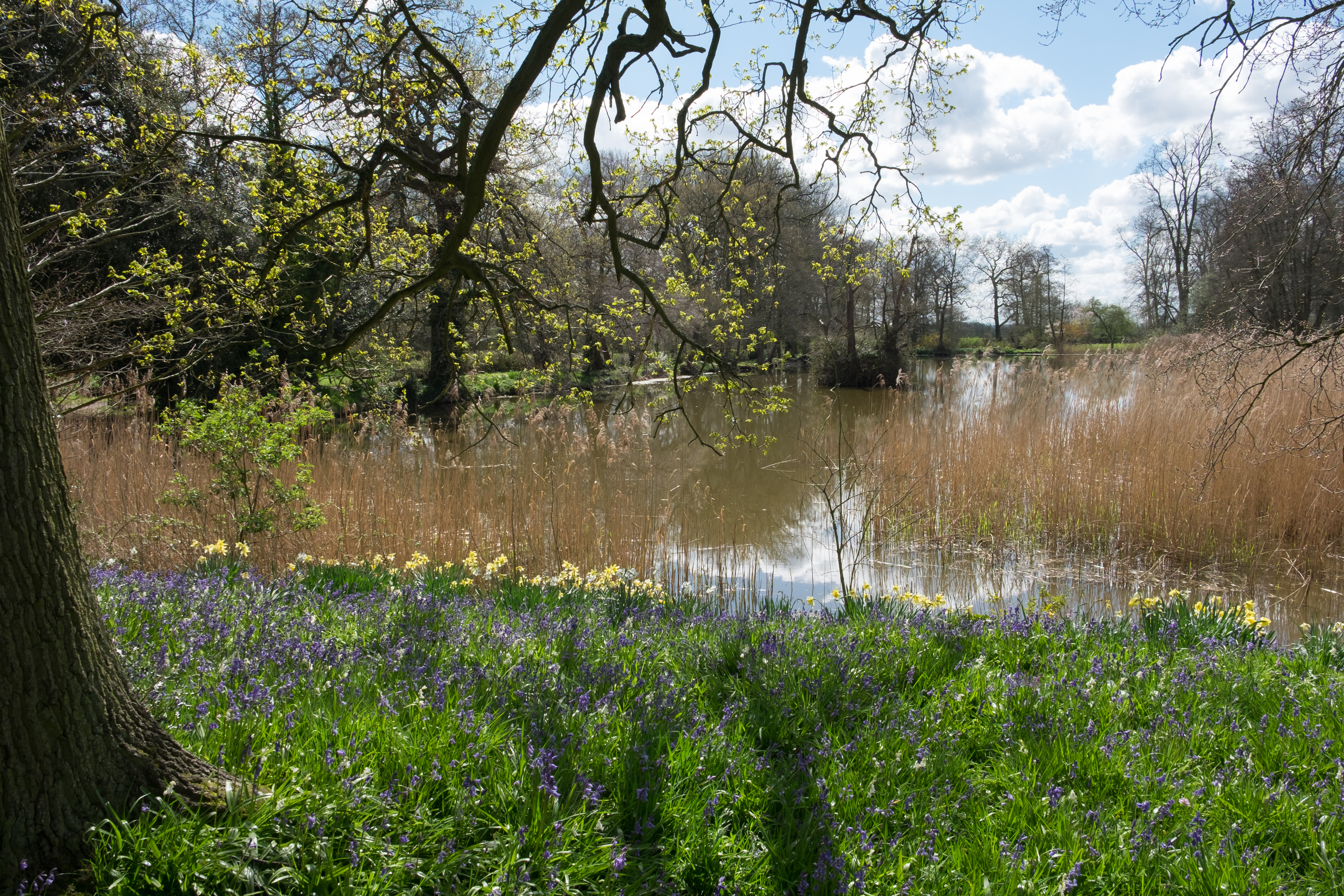
The lake

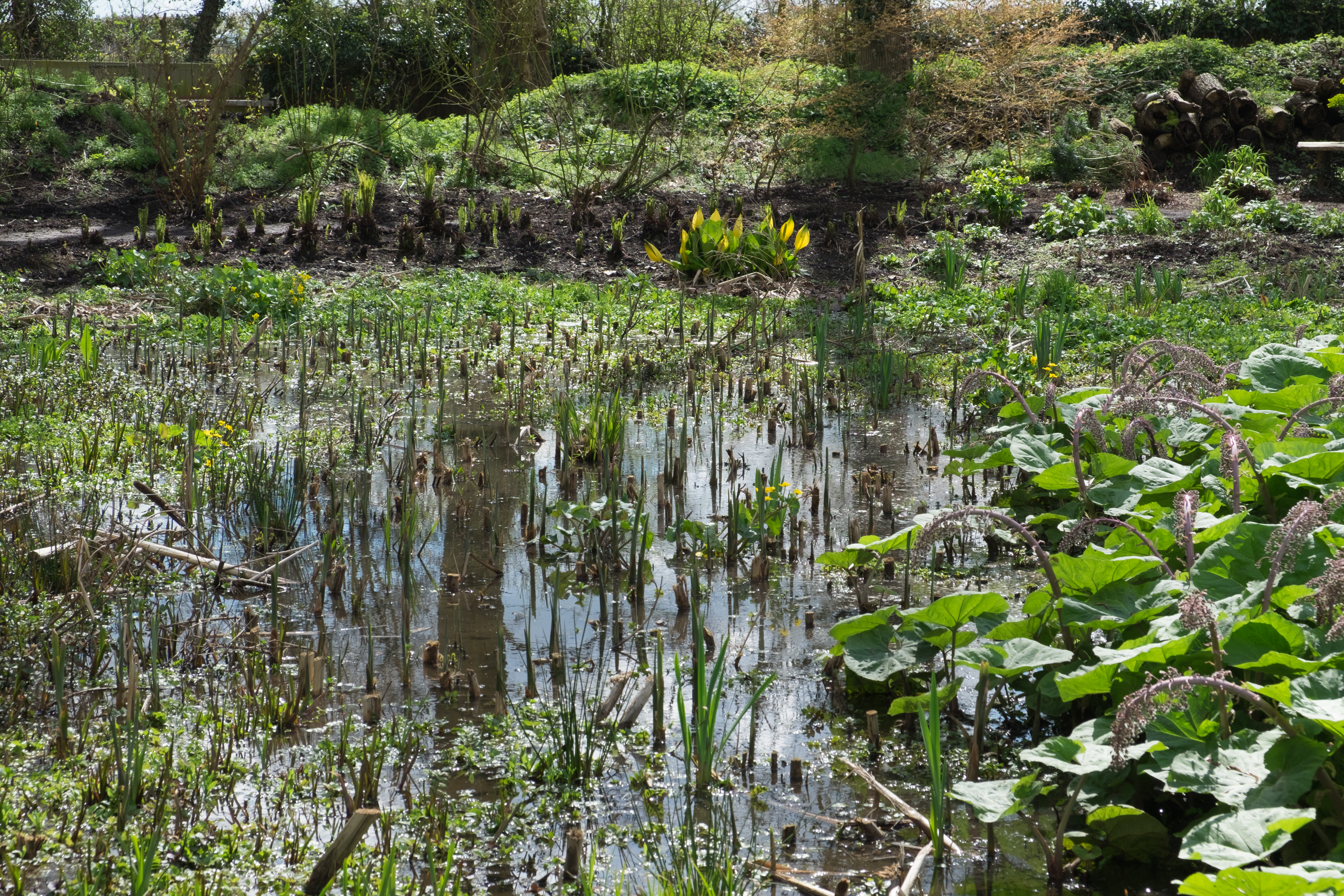
The bog garden

== See also ==
- Hampton Court Palace
- Throckmorton baronets

== Other sources ==
- Coughton Court (1979) Booklet for National Trust by J Lees-Milne.
- "Six centuries in the same house". The Daily Telegraph. 5 September 2009.
