= Manor of Molland =

Polity in North Devon, England

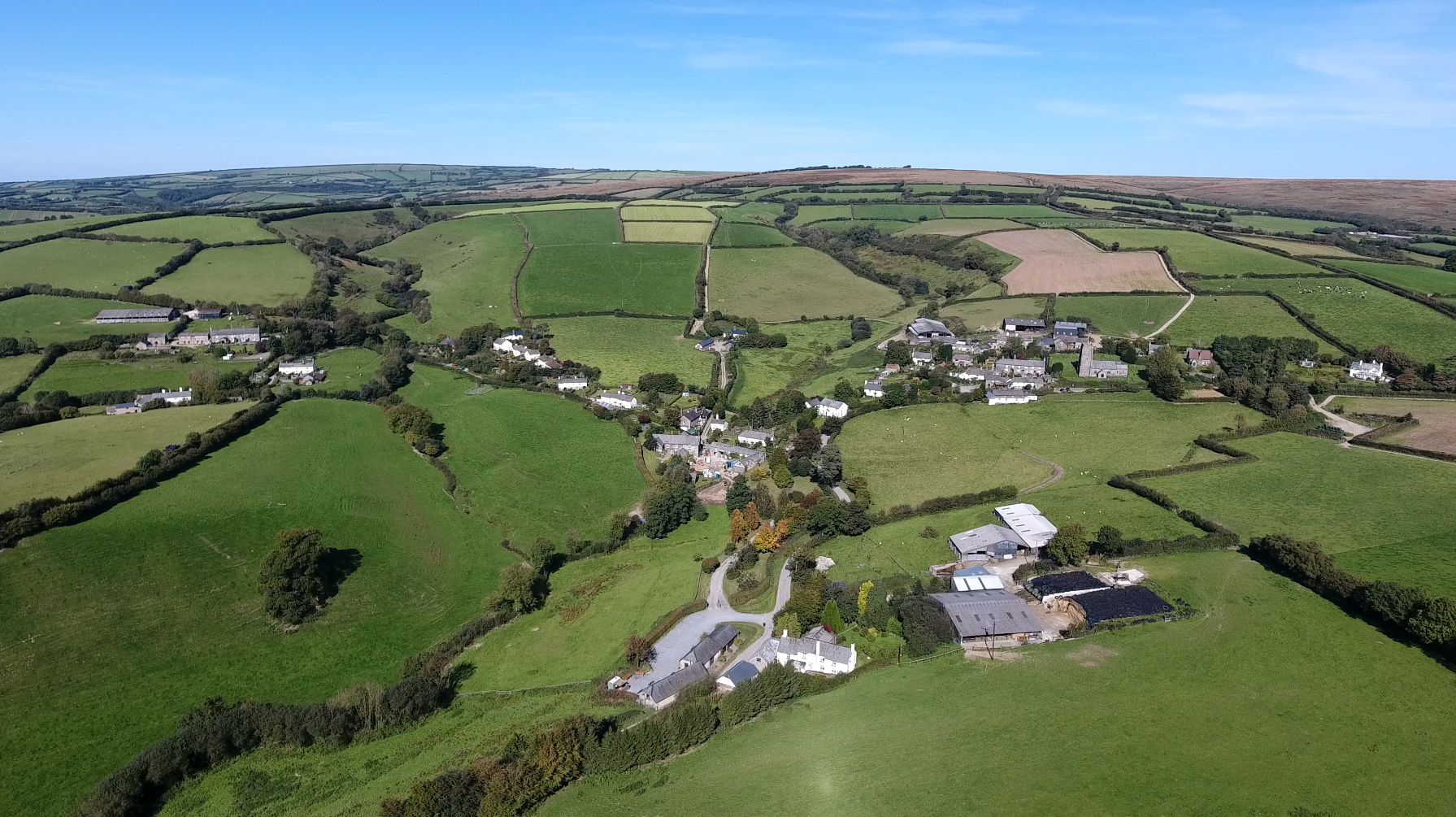
Molland, aerial panorama viewed from south. Far left: Great Champson, Middle Champson, Little Champson. Foreground: Copphall

The Manor of Molland was a medieval manor in North Devon, England. It was largely co-terminous with the parish of Molland, where it was situated the village of Molland. More accurately, it consisted of two separate manors, held from separate overlords, later known as Molland-Bottreaux and Molland-Champson.

== Descent of the manor ==
The Exeter Domesday Book of 1086 records three entries for manors called "Molland", two in South Molton hundred and one in North Molton hundred. The latter does not relate to today's village and estate of Molland, but to a separate ancient small manor later called "Molland-Sarazen", about 7 miles to the north-west, in the modern parish of North Molton. It is now memorialized by the name of Higher Molland Farm and Molland Cross. This manor in North Molton hundred was held by Tetbald, son of Berner, who was the father-in-law of Odo. The two entries for Molland in South Molton hundred relate to a former ancient division of the present unified manor into two parts: One larger part listed under the demesne of the king, the other much smaller part under the lands of Geoffrey de Montbray (died 1093), Bishop of Coutances, both in the county of "Devenesira" or "Devrescira". These two divisions of Molland later became known respectively as "Molland Bottreaux" after the Botreaux family and "Molland Champeaux" now memorialized by Champson Farm, between Molland Church and West Molland Barton.

The royal manor was granted by the king to the Botreaux family as his tenants-in-chief whilst the smaller manor became a part of the feudal barony of Barnstaple and was granted, by the feudal barons of Barnstaple, several other manors (see below), to one of their knights, a member of the de Champeaux family (Latinised to de Champellis/Campellis).

=== Molland-Bottreaux ===
==== Domesday Book, Molland-Bottreaux ====
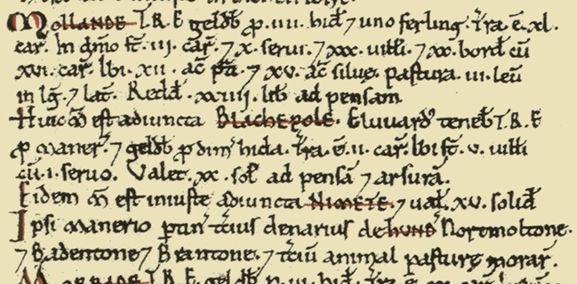
Text of Exeter Domesday Book of 1086

The text of Exeter Domesday Book of 1086, relating to the manor later known as Molland-Bottreaux, under the heading "The King's Demesne belonging to the kingdom in Devenesscira" is as follows (abbreviations indicated by tildes expanded):

Mollande tempore regis Edwardi geldabat pro iiii hidis et uno ferling. Terra est xl carucis. In dominio sunt iii carucae et x servi et xxx villani et xx bordarii cum xvi carucis. Ibi xii acrae prati et xv acrae silvae. Pastura iii leugae in longitudine et latitudine. Reddit xxiiii libras ad pensam. Huic manerio est adjuncta Blachepole. Elwardus tenebat tempore regis Edwardi pro manerio et geldabat pro dimidia hida. Terra est ii carucis. Ibi sunt v villani cum i servo. Valet xx solidos ad pensam et arsuram. Eidem manerio est injuste adjuncta Nimete et valet xv solidos. Ipsi manerio pertinet tercius denarius de Hundredis Nortmoltone et Badentone et Brantone et tercium animal pasturae morarum

Translated as follows:

Molland in the time of King Edward (the Confessor) paid geld for four hides and one furlong. There is land for forty ploughs. In demesne are three ploughs, and ten serfs, and thirty villeins, and twenty bordars, with sixteen ploughs. There are twelve acres of meadow, and fifteen acres of wood. Pasture three leagues in length and breadth. It renders twenty-four pounds by weight. To this manor has been annexed Blackpool. Alward held it in the time of King Edward as a manor, and it paid geld for half a hide. There is land for two ploughs. There are five villeins with one serf. It is worth twenty shillings by weight and assay. To the same manor has been unjustly annexed Nymet, and it is worth fifteen shillings. To the same manor pertains the third penny of the hundreds of North Molton and Bampton and Braunton, and the third animal of the pasture of the moors.

==== Botreaux ====
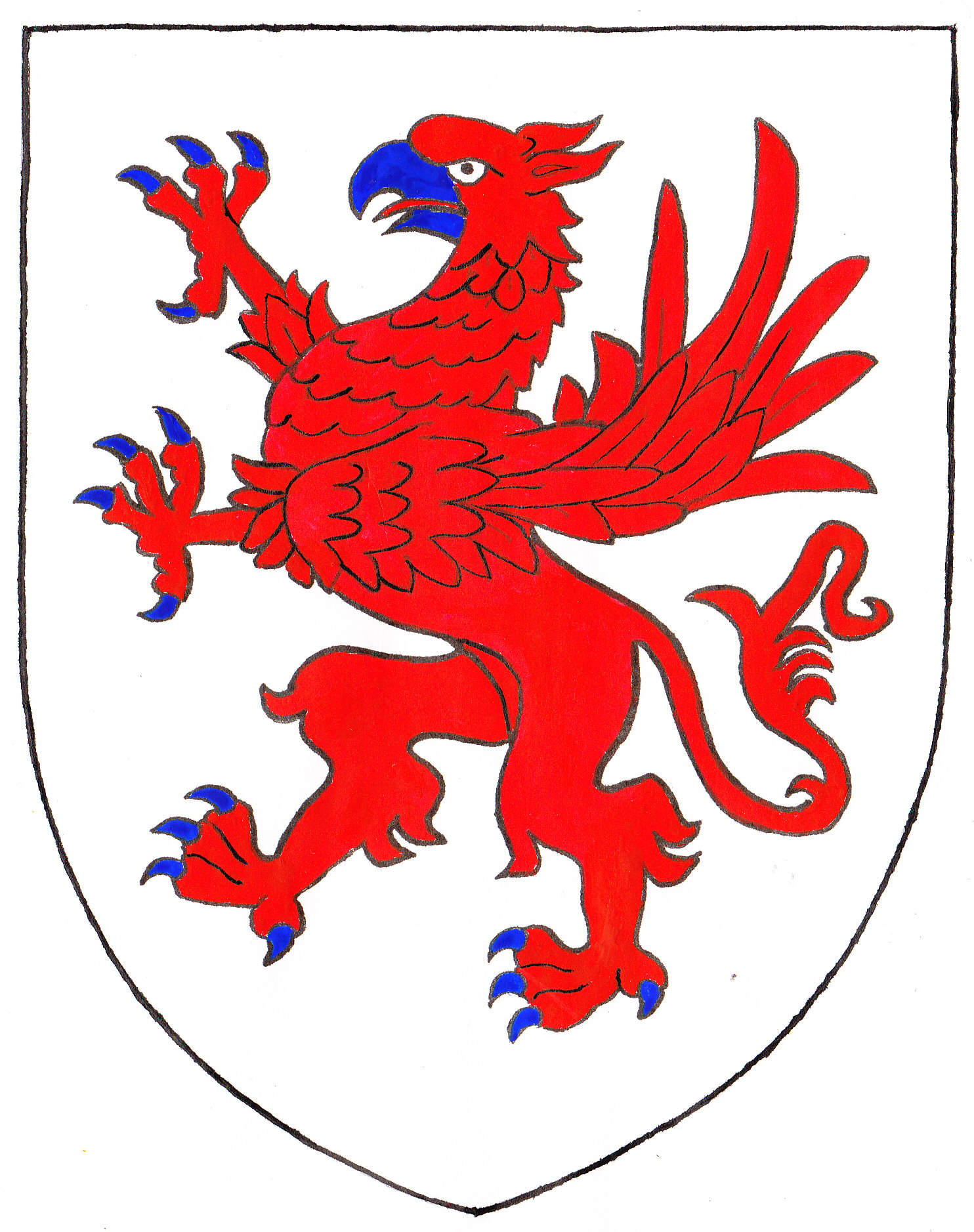
Arms of Botreaux: Argent, a griffin segreant gules armed azure

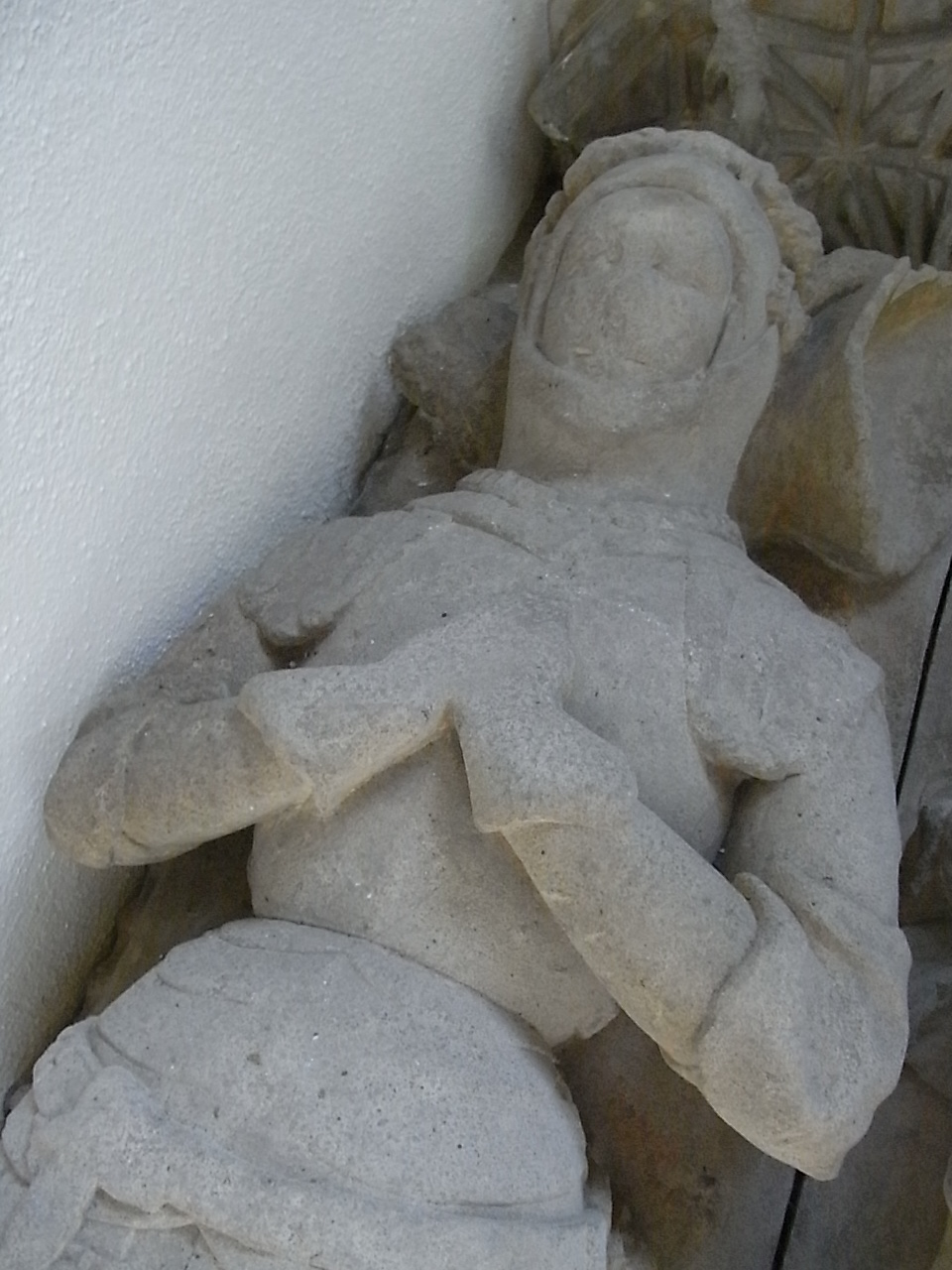
Effigy of William de Botreaux, 3rd Baron Botreaux (died 1462), North Cadbury Church, Somerset

The larger manor was granted by the king to a Norman knight named de Botreaux, probably from Les Bottreaux, Upper Normandy, 40 km SW of Evreux, in the modern departement of Eure, who had built a castle at Forrabury on the North Cornish coast, now known as Boscastle after his family. The manor which then became known as "Molland-Bottreaux" included the adjacent manor of Knowstone and before 1189 either the original recipient of Molland or his descendant, a certain "William de Botreaux" gave the advowsons of the churches of Forrabury, Molland and Knowstone to the newly founded Hartland Abbey, on the coast about half-way between Forrabury and Molland. These grants were confirmed by King Richard I (1189–1199) soon after he became king, in a charter dated 8 November 1189. A further grant dated 1295 by the Bishop of Exeter of the Church of Knowstone to Hartland Abbey survives in the Somerset Records Office, with good impressions of seals. The advowsons of all three churches continued to be held by Hartland until the Dissolution of the Monasteries. The earliest member of the family who can be firmly identified is Reynold (died 1273), father of William (died 1302), father of William (died 1342), father of Reynold (died 1346), father of William (died 1349) who was the father of William de Botreaux, 1st Baron Botreaux (1337–1391). The Botreaux landholdings expanded greatly when William de Botreaux (died 1349) married Isabel de Moels, daughter and co-heiress of her father John de Moels, 4th Baron Moels (died 1337) whose family had held since the time of Nicholas de Moels(died. c. 1270) a moiety of the feudal barony of North Cadbury, Somerset. Isabel's co-heiress was her sister Muriel, wife of Sir Thomas Courtenay (died 1356), younger son of Hugh Courtenay, 1st Earl of Devon (died 1340)). The sisters' uncle Nicholas de Moels, 2nd Baron Moels (died 1316) had been the husband of Margaret Courtenay (died 1349), the 1st Earl's sister. The caput of the feudal barony was at North Cadbury. John de Botreaux the 3rd son of the 1st Baron is said to have lived at Molland. The first baron's son was William de Botreaux, 2nd Baron Botreaux (1367–1395) and his son was William de Botreaux, 3rd Baron Botreaux (1389–1462), who was the last of the male line, and was buried in North Cadbury Church, where his effigy with that of his wife Elizabeth Beaumont survives today. In 1435 he was appointed by Richard, Duke of York (died 1460), father of the future King Edward IV (1461–1483), as forester of the royal forests of Exmoor and of Neroche, Somerset.

==== Hungerford ====
On the death of the 3rd Baron Botreaux without male heir his sole heiress to his large estates including Molland was his daughter Margaret de Botreaux (died 1477) who married Robert Hungerford, 2nd Baron Hungerford (died 1459), to whom the lands passed jure uxoris. When Lord Hungerford's sister Elizabeth married Sir Philip Courtenay (1404–1463) of Powderham, she took with her the manor of Molland-Bottreaux for her marriage portion. Sir Philip was the grandson of Sir Philip Courtenay, KG, (1340–1406) of Powderham, the 4th son of Hugh Courtenay, 2nd Earl of Devon (1303–1377) by his wife Margaret de Bohun, daughter of Humphrey de Bohun, 4th Earl of Hereford (died 1322). He had been bequeathed the Bohun manor of Powderham by the will of his mother dated 1390, the estates of his father having all descended to his eldest brother Hugh Courtenay, K.G. (1326–1349) and his descendants, Earls of Devon.

==== Courtenay of Molland ====
Arms of Courtenay of Molland: Or, three torteaux a label of three points azure each point charged with three plates. These are the ancient arms of the Courtenay Earls of Devon differenced by a label which itself is further differenced by charges

===== Sir Philip Courtenay (1430–7 February 1489) =====
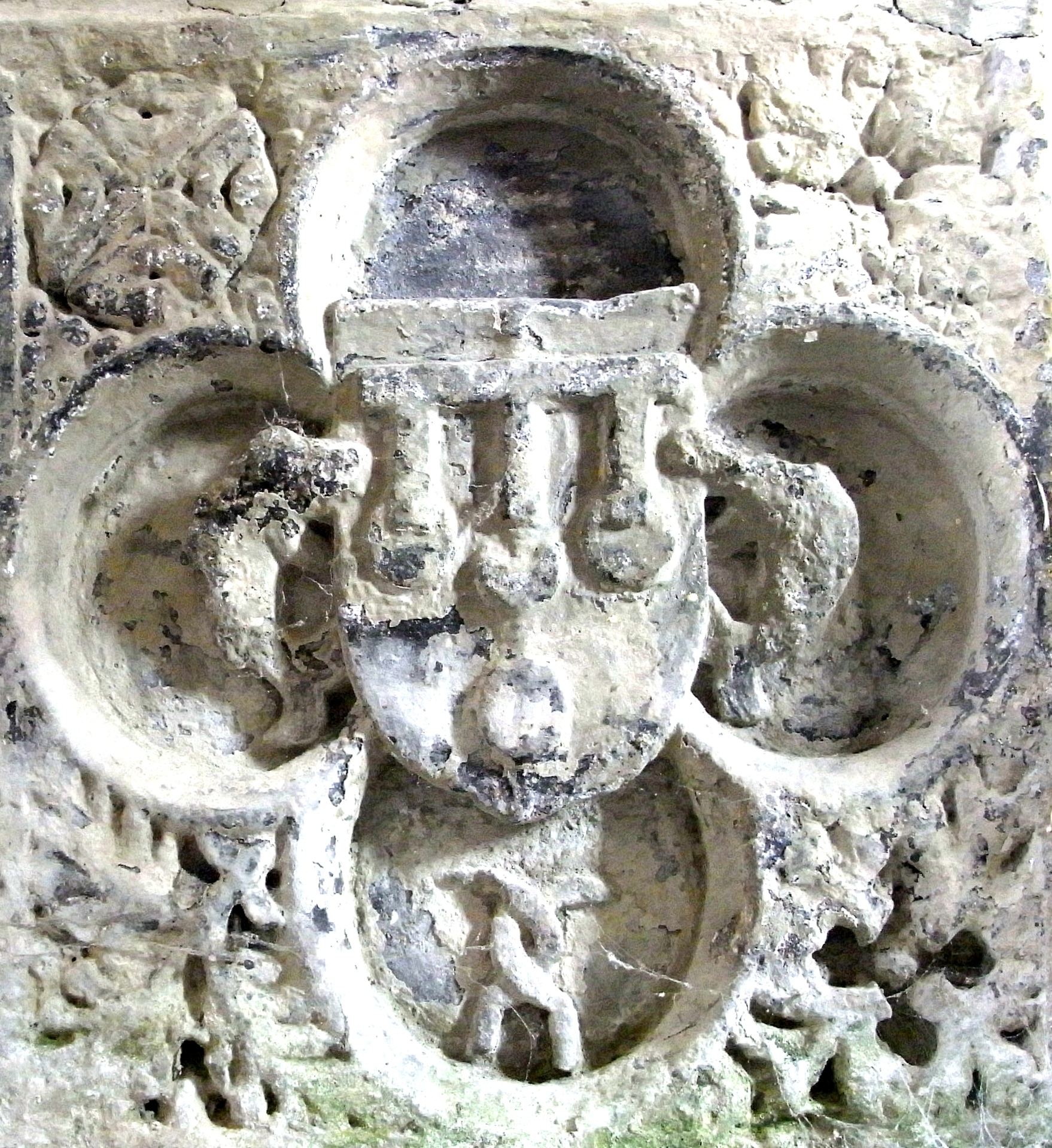
Fragment from a demolished Gothic chest tomb in Molland Church, showing within a quatrefoil the arms of Courtenay of Molland supported by two dolphins, a heraldic badge of Courtenay of Powderham, and showing beneath two interlaced Hungerford sickles, the heraldic badge of that family

The first Courtenay to have been seated at Molland was Sir Philip Courtenay (c. 1430–7 February 1489), Sheriff of Devon in 1470, and a Member of Parliament. He was the second son of Sir Philip Courtenay (1404–1463) of Powderham by his wife Elizabeth Hungerford, daughter of Walter Hungerford, 1st Baron Hungerford (died 1449), by his first wife Catherine Peverell, daughter of Sir Thomas Peverell, MP, of Parke and Hamatethy, Cornwall. He was given by his mother the manor of Molland as his marriage portion and established there his own branch of the family. He married a certain Elizabeth (c.1432-1482) (possibly daughter and heiress of John Wonwell (d.pre-1458) of Wonwell in the parish of Kingston, Devon), the widow of William Hingeston/Hyndeston who was an MP for Exeter in 1442 and for Devon 1445–51. Elizabeth had a son from her first marriage named Robert Hyndeston, aged 30 at her death.

Rogers described as "seemingly portions of a raised tomb" fragments of sculpted stone decorated with gothic quatrefoils and heraldic shields, which stand in Molland Church. These form a small box-like object now situated railed-off on the floor against the east wall of the north aisle under the mural monument to John Courtenay (died 1732). This object was referred to by W.G. Hoskins as "a curious double heart-stone...a receptacle for the hearts of a Courtenay and his wife". The escutcheons show the arms of Courtenay alone and quartering a bend, on which in 1877 were visible three indistinct charges. One escutcheon of Courtenay is supported by two dolphins.

Sir Philip Courtenay had the following children:

- John Courtenay (1466–1510), of Molland, eldest son and heir (see below)
- Philip Courtenay, second son, who married Jane Fowell, daughter of Richard Fowell of Fowelscombe, Ugborough. He was the heir of his brother William of Loughtor and Loughtor descended to his sole daughter and heiress Elizabeth Courtenay, who married William Strode (died 1579) of Newnham, Plympton St Mary, and on which site in about 1700 they built their new seat of New Newnham House, today known as Newnham Park, a 1,500 acre estate and the site of a clay-pigeon shooting school, in 2014 still owned by descendants of this marriage.

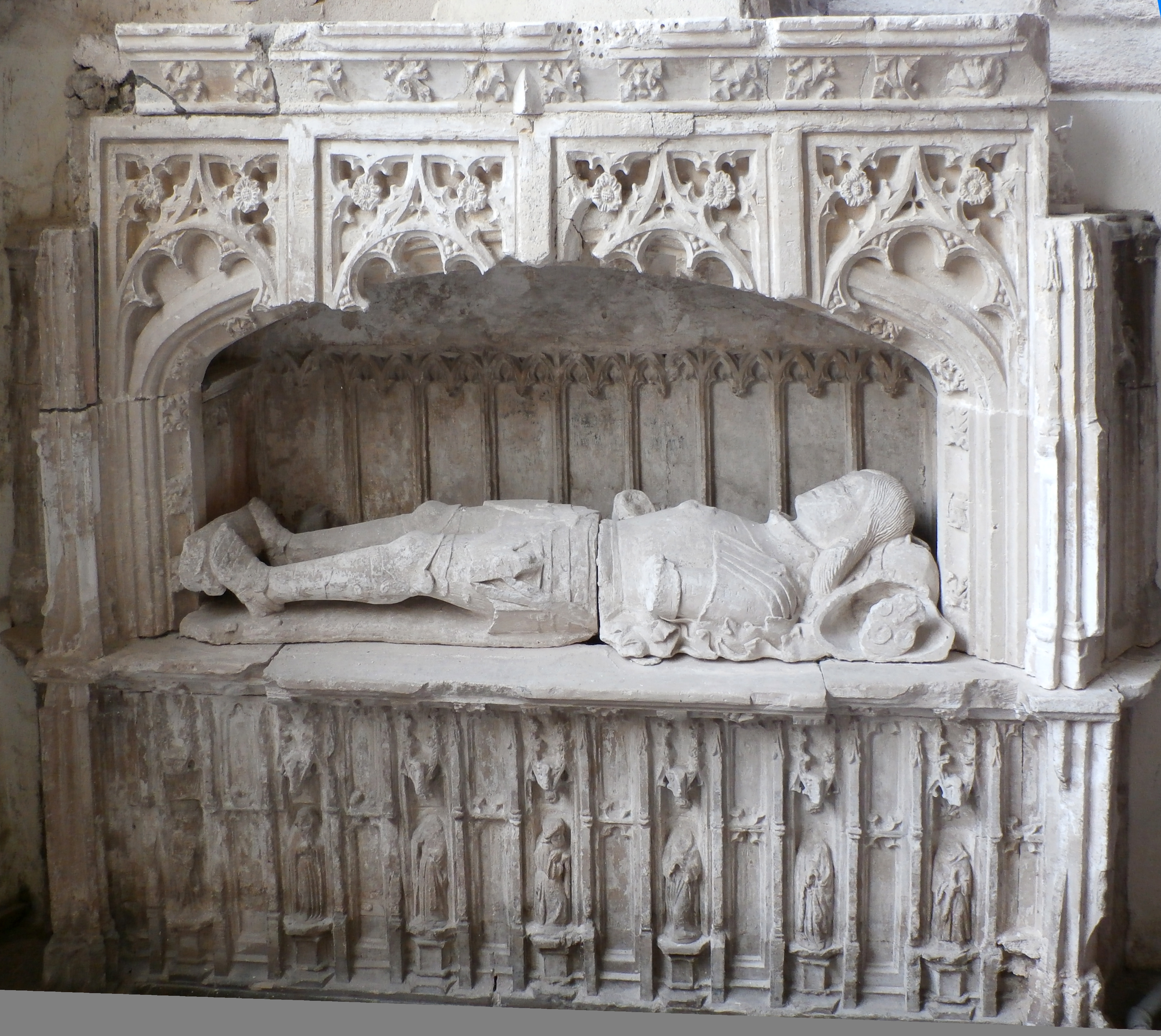
15th century monument to William Courtenay of Loughtor, St Mary's Church, Plympton

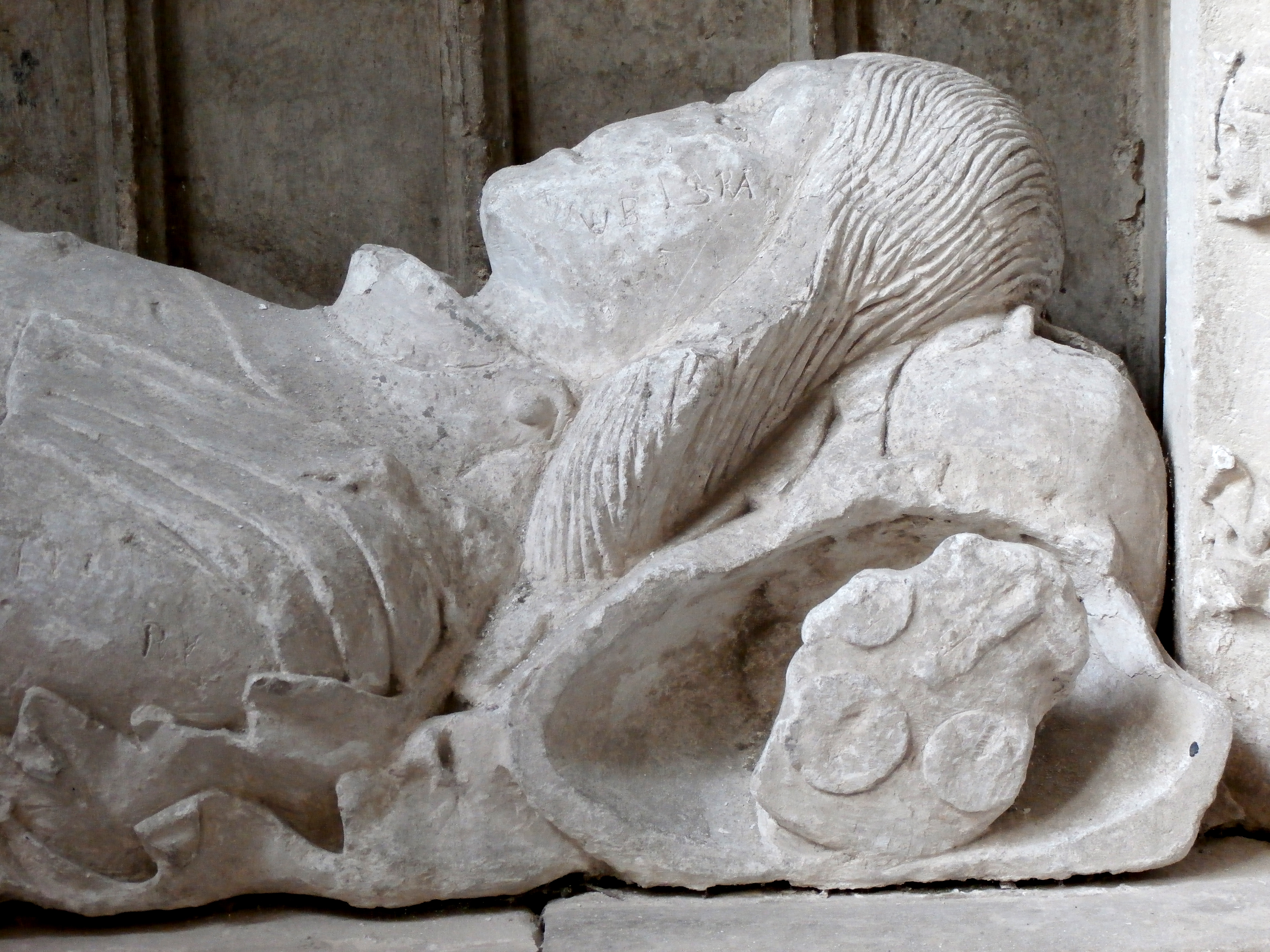
William Courtenay of Loughtor, with mutilated escutcheon within his helm on which rests his head showing arms of Courtenay of Molland. Detail from his monument in St Mary's Church, Plympton

- William Courtenay (third son), of Loughtor, Plympton St Mary, Devon, in the church of which exists his probable effigy. The Courtenays, before they had become Earls of Devon, had been feudal barons of Okehampton and of Plympton.
- Elizabeth Courtenay (died before 1509) married Sir Edward Courtenay, 1st Earl of Devon (died 1509) who in 1485 was created Earl of Devon by King Henry VII following the extinction of the ancient line of his cousins the Courtenay Earls of Devon in 1471, after the three Courtenay brothers, each successively Earl of Devon, were killed or executed during the Wars of the Roses: Thomas Courtenay, 6th Earl of Devon (died 1461), Henry (died 1466), deemed by many sources to have inherited the earldom de jure, and John Courtenay, 15th Earl of Devon (died 1471), killed at the Battle of Tewkesbury. Edward Courtenay was the son of Sir Hugh Courtenay (c.1427–6 May 1471) of Boconnoc, Cornwall, son of Sir Hugh Courtenay (aft 1358–5 or 6 March 1425) of Haccombe, Devon, younger brother of Edward de Courtenay, 3rd/11th Earl of Devon (d. 1419).
- Margaret Courtenay, married Sir John Champernoun (died 1503) of Dartington. Their only son Sir Philip Champernowne (died 1545) of Modbury, married Katherine Carew, daughter of Sir Edmund Carew.

===== John I Courtenay (1466–27 March 1510) =====
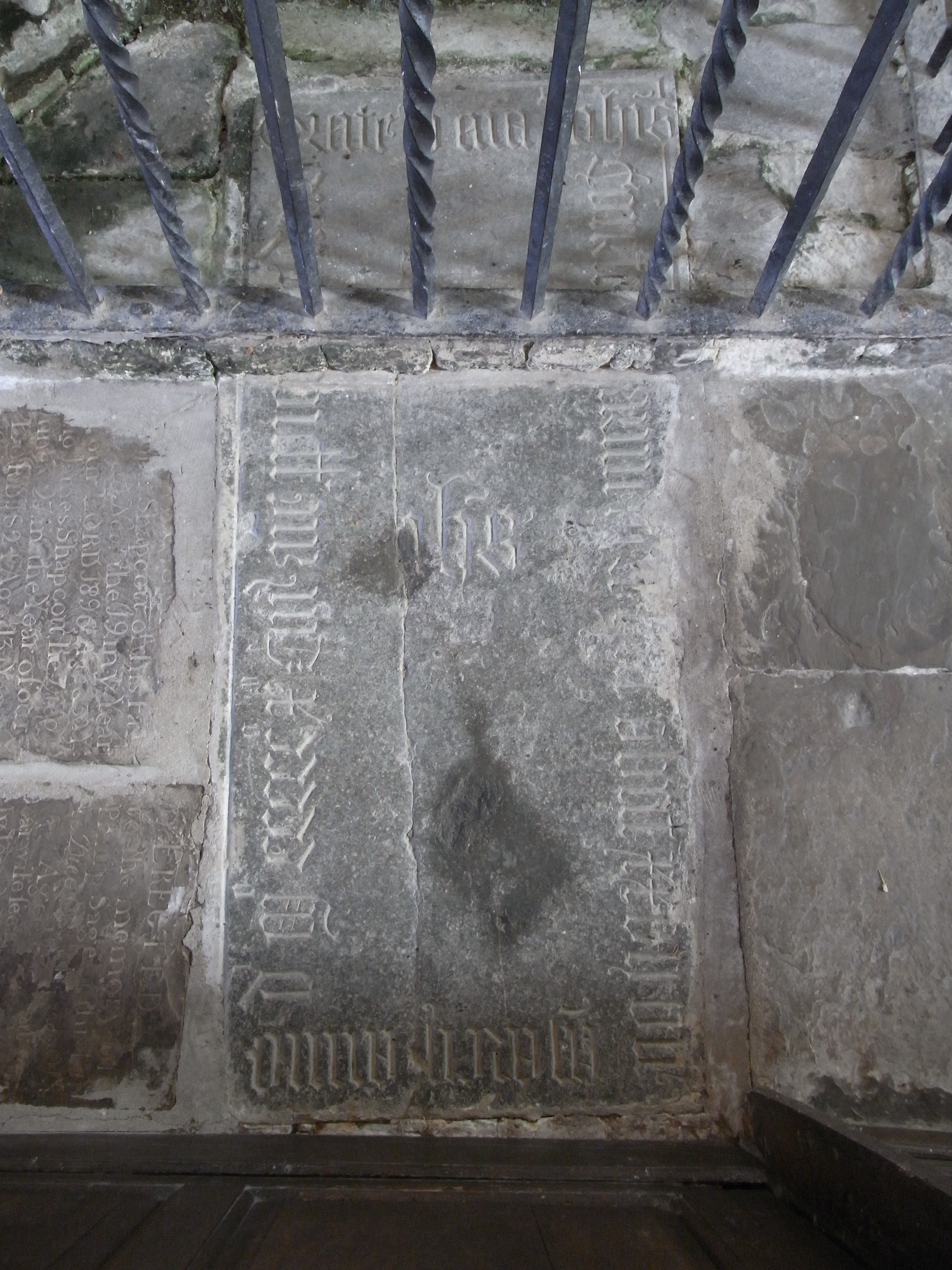
ledger stone of John Courtenay (died 1510) in Molland Church, Devon

John I Courtenay (1466–27 March 1510) (eldest son), married Joan Brett, the sister of Robert Brett (died 1540), lord of the manor of Pilland in the parish of Pilton and the last steward of Pilton Priory who in 1536 following its dissolution purchased the Prior's House (now called "Bull House") next to Pilton Church. Joan married secondly (after 1510), as his second wife, Sir John Chichester (died 1537) of Raleigh in the parish of Pilton, and from her were descended the cadet branch of the Chichester family of Arlington. The Brett family was from Whitestaunton in Somerset and had married the heiress of Pilland late in the 15th. century. The family is today represented by Viscount Esher. The arms of Brett are: Or, a lion rampant between six crosses crosslet fitchy gules. John Courtenay is stated by John Stowe to have fought for King Edward IV at the Battle of Tewkesbury in 1471. John's uncle was Peter Courtenay (1440–1492) Bishop of Exeter subsequently Bishop of Winchester. His second son by Joan Brett was John Courtenay who married Elizabeth Chichester, a daughter of James Chichester (died 1548) of Hall, Bishop's Tawton, and who founded a cadet Courtenay line which continued to live at Molland, in residence unknown, until the 18th. century, and intermarried with the senior line of Courtenay of Molland descended from his elder brother Phillip II. The ledger stone of John I Courtenay (d.1510) survives in Molland Church, inscribed in gothic text within a ledger line as follows:

Orate p(ro) a(n)i(m)a Joh(anne(s) Courtenay armigeri qui obiit xxvii die Marciii Anno d(omini) mcccccx cui(us) a(n)i(ma)e p(ro)p(i)cietur Deus. ("Pray for the soul of John Courtenay, esquire, who died on the 27th day of March in the year of The Lord 1510 to whose soul may God be favorably inclined"). In the centre of the slab are incised the letters IHS, ("JH(ESU)S")

===== Philip II Courtenay (died 1548) =====
Philip II Courtenay (died 1548) of Molland, (eldest son) married Alice Matthew of Dodbrook. One of his daughters, Dorothy, married Anthony Culme "of Tiverton", of unknown relationship to the Culme family of Molland-Champson which acquired Canonsleigh Abbey near Tiverton after the Dissolution of the Monasteries.

===== Robert Courtenay (died 1583) =====
Robert Courtenay (died 1583), (eldest son and heir), married three times, firstly to Dorothy Pollard (died 1560), daughter of Sir Hugh I Pollard (fl.1535,1545), lord of the manor of King's Nympton, Sheriff of Devon in 1535/6 and Recorder of Barnstaple in 1545. He married secondly Joan Coles and thirdly in 1583 to Joan Fortescue, daughter of Lewis Fortescue of Fallapit.

===== Philip III Courtenay (1547–1611) =====
Philip III Courtenay (1547–1611) (son by first wife Dorothy Pollard), married Joane Boyes (died 1586), daughter of John Boyes of Kent. One of their daughters, Lydia, married Richard Culme in Molland Church. Their daughter Elizabeth Courtenay (died 1624) married in 1600 to the Hollander Peter Muden, a doctor of medicine, of Butterleigh, three miles south-east of Tiverton. Muden reconstructed Butterleigh parish church and later erected in it a mural monument to his wife which included a female effigy between two children with verse, of which only one fragment survives, a small alabaster statue of a kneeling man.

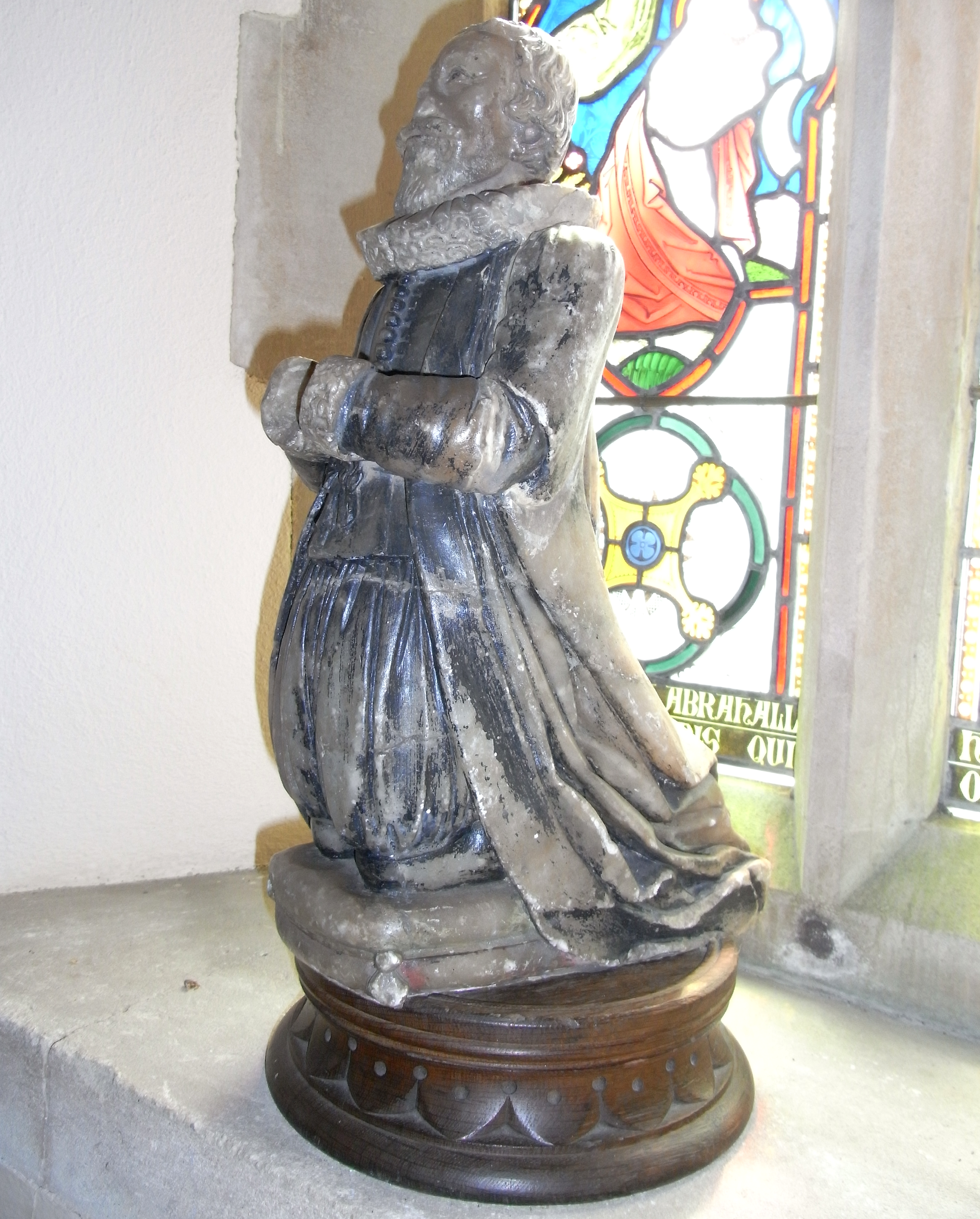
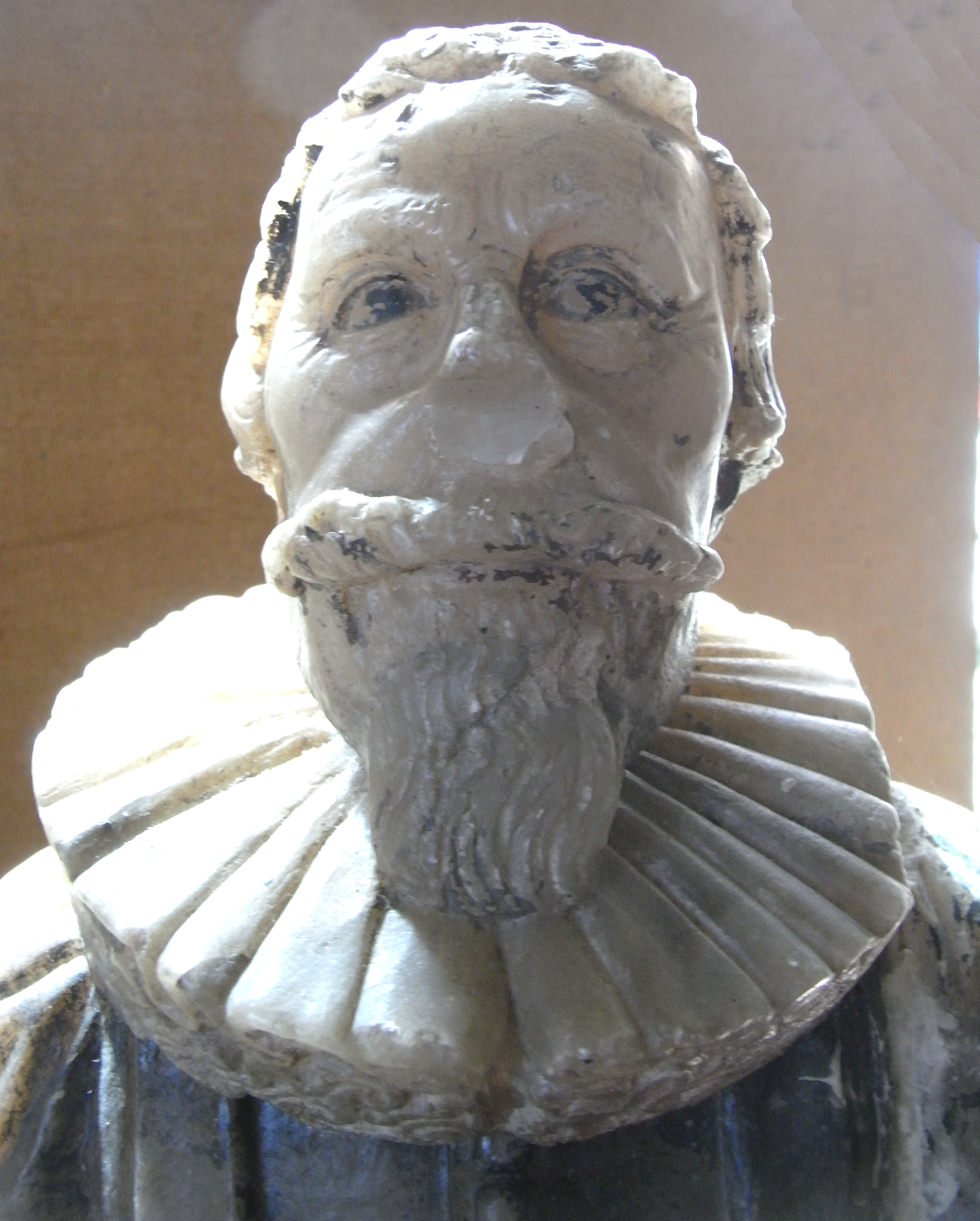
Alabaster statue of a kneeling man, the sole surviving element of the Muden/Courtenay monument in Butterleigh Church

===== Humphrey Courtenay (1568–1634) =====
Humphrey Courtenay (1568–1634), (eldest son), married Jane Mohun, daughter of Sir William Mohun of Hall. The marriage was without progeny. She survived her husband and remarried Sir John Specot of Thornbury.

===== Charles Courtenay (died 1612) =====
Charles Courtenay (died 1612) (brother), married in 1601 to Ann Coles, daughter of John Coles of Barken.

===== John II Courtenay (d.1660/1) =====
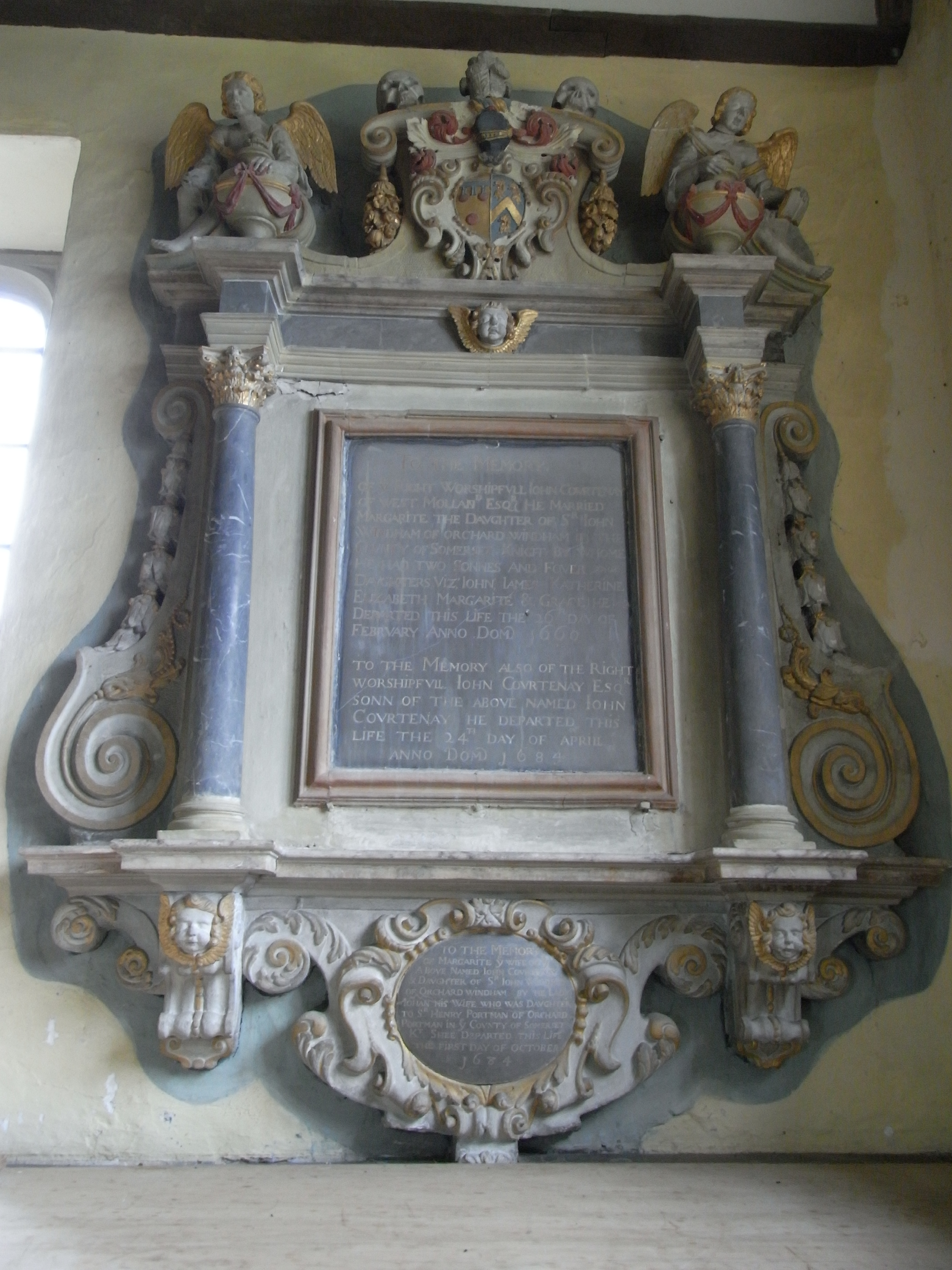
Mural monument to John Courtenay (died 1660). Above is an escutcheon displaying the arms of Courtenay of Molland impaling Wyndham

John II Courtenay (d.1660/1) (son), married Margaret Wyndham, daughter of Sir Sir John Wyndham (1558–1645) of Orchard Wyndham in Somerset. His monument is situated in Molland Church on the north wall of the north aisle and is inscribed thus:

"To the memory of ye Right Worshipfull John Courtenay of West Molland, Esq'r (He married Margarite the daughter of Sir John Windham of Orchard Windham in the county of Somerset, Knight, by whom he had two sons and four daughters, viz John, James, Katherine, Elizabeth, Margarite & Grace) He departed this life the 26th day of February Anno Dom(ini) 1660. To the memory also of the Right Worshipfull John Courtenay Esq'r son of the above named John Courtenay. He departed this life the 24th day of April Anno Dom(ini) 1684".

On a roundel under:

To the memory of Margarite ye wife of ye above named John Courtenay & daughter of Sir John Windham of Orchard Windham by the Lady Johan his wife who was daughter of Sir Henry Portman of Orchard Portman in ye county of Somerset, Knight. Shee departed this life the first day of October 1684

John II Courtenay was a royalist during the Civil War and his estates were sequestered and he was fined heavily by the victorious parliamentarians in 1647 for his delinquency as the following resolution of the House of Commons of England dated 21 September 1647 records:

Resolved, etc., that this House doth accept of the sum of seven hundred and fifty pounds, for a fine, for the delinquency of John Courtney, of Molland in the County of Devon, Esquire: his offence is, that he assisted the forces raised against the Parliament: he rendered before December 1645: his estate, in old rents, in fee, per annum, sixty-eight pounds eleven shillings and fourpence; in demesne, in fee, per annum, one hundred and thirty-seven pounds seven shillings and fourpence; in personal estate, eight hundred pounds: out of which issues thirteen pounds six shillings and eightpence for one life: which leaves the fine, at a tenth, seven hundred and fifty pounds ... An ordinance for granting a pardon unto John Courtney of Molland, in the County of Devon, Esquire, for his delinquency, and for taking off the sequestration of his estate, was this day read; and, upon the question, passed; and ordered to be sent to the Lords for their concurrence

His younger children included Catherine Courtenay (1632–1671), first wife of John Moore (1636-1700) of Upcott, Cheriton Fitzpaine and James Courtenay (died 1683) of Meshaw who has a large and ornate mural monument in the church there. James was however buried at Molland, and is featured in two important and interesting monuments in Molland Church. These relate to his second wife Elizabeth Lynn (died 1700), with whom he had a "passionate" relationship and who had a very interesting burial arrangement and was responsible for the erection of several monuments in the churches of Molland and Meshaw and Swimbridge.

====== James Courtenay (d. 1683) of Meshaw ======
James Courtenay (d.1683), the second son of John II Courtenay (d.1660/1), died at his residence in Meshaw in 1683, in which parish church there exists a large mural monument to his memory. He was however buried in Molland Church in the grave of his first wife Susanna Sandford, whose slate tombstone is in the floor of the north aisle. In this same grave is also buried James's second wife Elizabeth Lynn (died 1700), who married James as her second husband and who erected the Meshaw monument. Elizabeth married thirdly Philip Shapcott of Shapcott in the parish of Knowstone (which latter manor was owned by the Courtenay family of Molland), as her slate mural monument on the east wall of the north aisle of Molland Church attests.

In the church of Meshaw is a mural monument with the following wording:

To the memory of James Courtnay (sic) Esq.r. 2d son of John Courtnay of Molland in this county, Esq.r. who died at Meshaw House the 27th of March 1683 & was buried among his ancestors in Molland Church in ye grave of his first wife Susanna ye daughter of Henry Sandford of Ninehead Flory in ye county of Somers.t, Esq.r. His 2d wife & relict (being also relict of Lewis Rosier of Swymbridge in this county, Gent.) was Elizabeth daughter of Will. Lynn Esq.r of Southwicke in Northha.ton.re who to ye lasting memory of her Lord did this too slender monument afford, for in her judgement she could scarce approve so mean an offering for so great a love. Were it as great and lasting too as she could wish ye me(m)ory of his love should be, this marble would out live eternity.

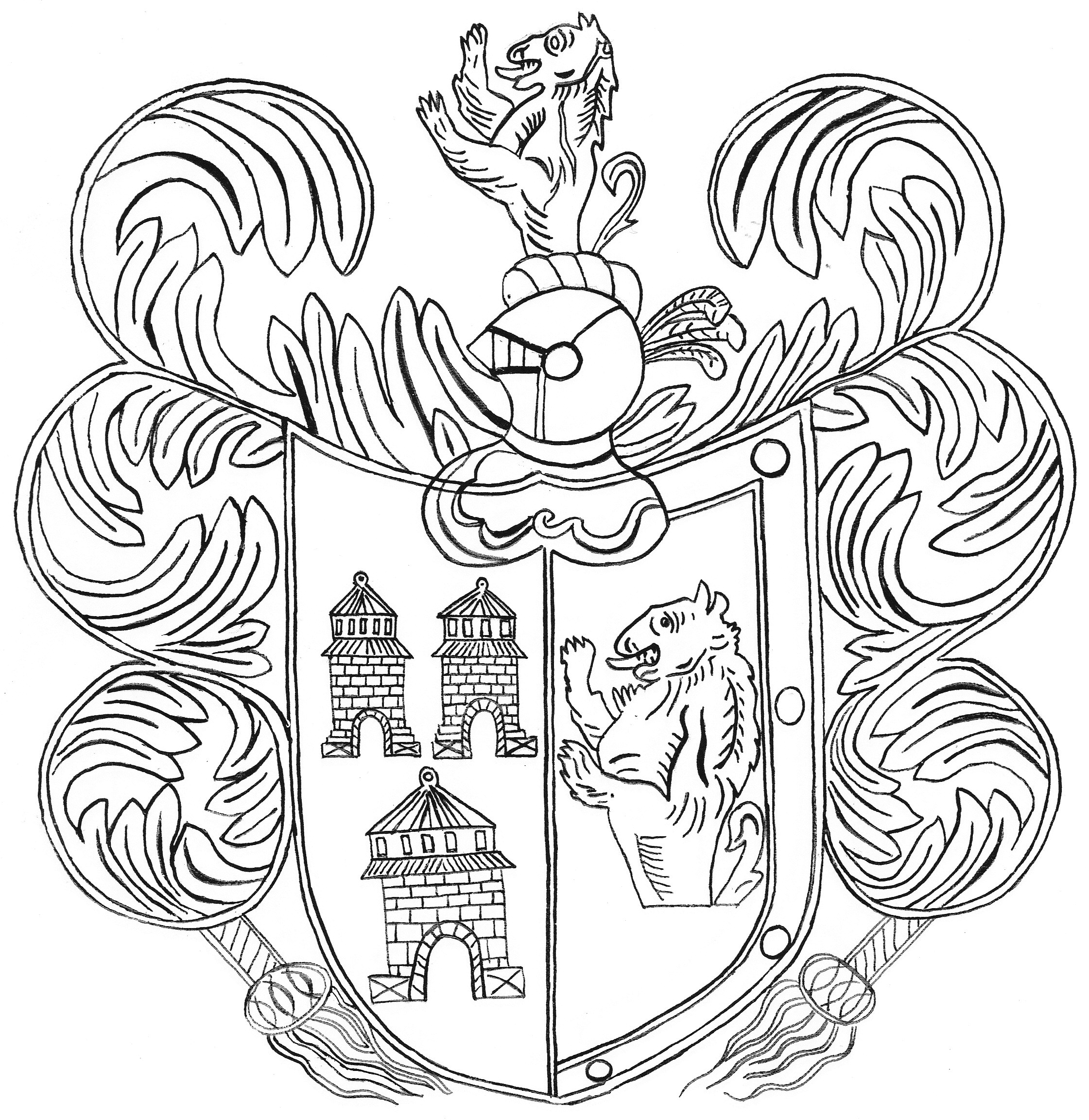
Arms of Mrs Elizabeth Shapcote (died 1700), rubbing from her monument in Molland Church. Born Elizabeth Lynn of Southwick Hall, Peterborough, she married as her second husband James Courtenay of Meshaw and thirdly Philip Shapcote, Esq, of Knowstone

Susanna Sandford was the daughter of Henry Sandford (died 1644) of Nynehead Court, Somerset (whose gravestone exists in the chancel floor of Nynehead Church), by Mary Ashford, heiress of Burlescombe, Devon. The originator of this monument at Meshaw was James Courtenay's second wife Elizabeth Lynn (died 1700), daughter of William Lynn of Southwick Hall, 11 miles SW of Peterborough, which family resided there between 1442 and 1840. Elizabeth had married James Courtenay as her second husband, having first married Lewis Rosier (died 1676) of Swimbridge, whose monument can be seen in St James's Church, Swimbridge. After James's death she married thirdly Philip Shapcote of Knowstone. Elizabeth was buried, according to her wishes, in the same tomb in Molland Church as her second husband James Courtenay, who had already been buried therein together with his first wife Susanna Sandford. This is made clear by her mural memorial tablet of stone covered with slate-coloured gesso in Molland Church on the east wall of the north aisle which reads as follows:

To ye memory of Mrs Shapcote ye wife of Philip Shapcote of Knowstone Esq. who was second wife & relict of James Courtenay Esq. and now lyes in this isle interr(ed) in ye same grave with him according to his passionate desires & her pro(mise) to him in testimony of their mutual love. Obiit 12.o Nov. 1700.

On the base of the tablet are engraved the arms of Shapcote Sable, 3 dovecotes argent impaling Lynn Argent, a demi-lion gules within a bordure bezantee The crest over the escutcheon is here a demi-lion rampant. The crest of Lynn is given in Burke's General Armory as: A lion's head erased (p. 633). The crest of Shapcote is there given as : A goat's head erased(p. 916)

===== John III Courtenay (died 1684) =====
John Courtenay (1630–1684), (eldest son) married Mary Stucley, daughter of John Stucley of Affeton Castle, Devon, by his wife Elizabeth Coode.

===== John IV Courtenay (died 1724) =====
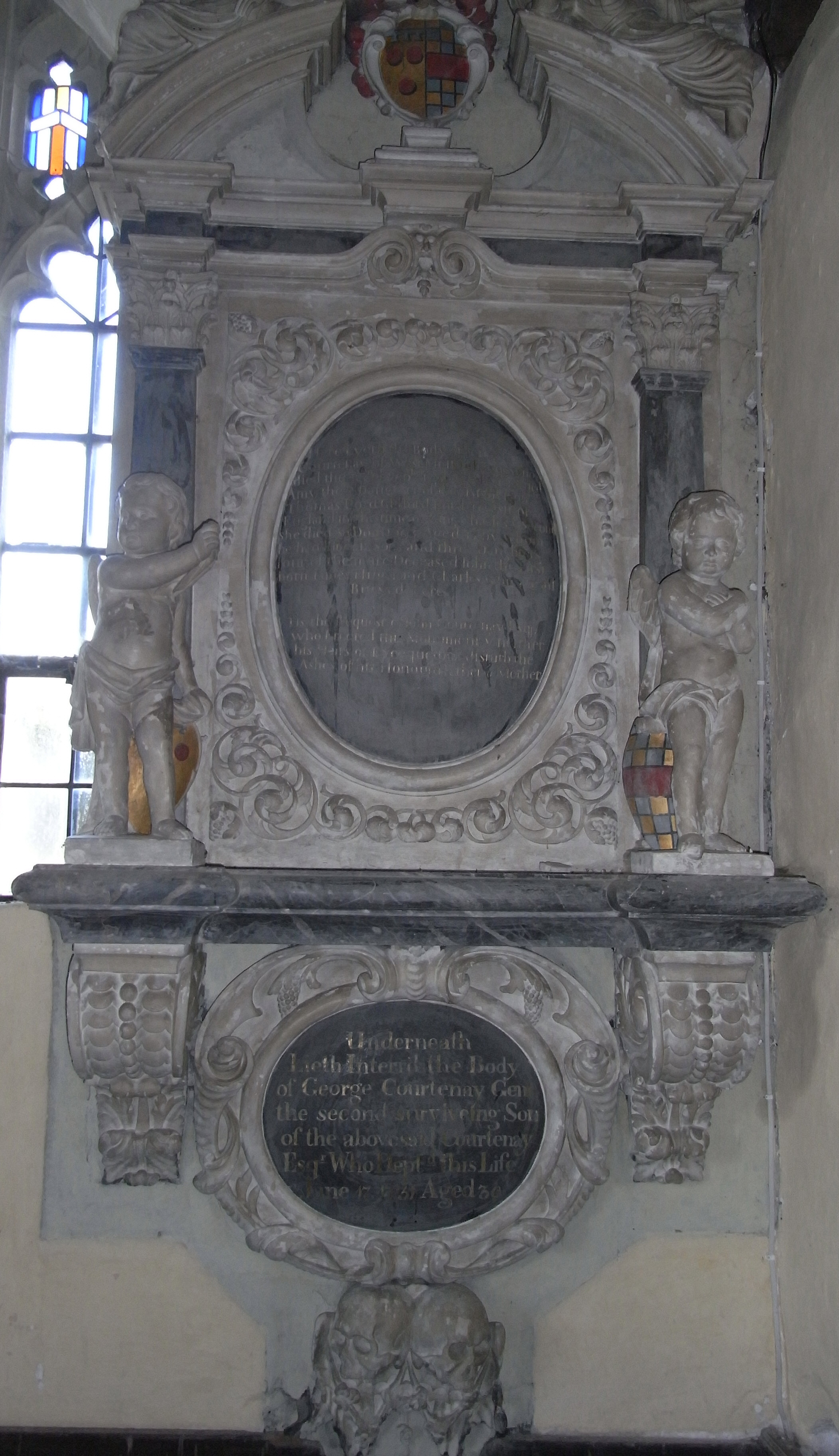
Mural monument to John Courtenay (died 1724), east wall of north aisle, Molland Church

John Courtenay (died 1724), (eldest surviving son and heir of John Courtenay (died 1684)), married Amy Clifford, third daughter of Thomas Clifford, 1st Baron Clifford of Chudleigh, (died 1673) of Ugbrooke Park, Chudleigh, Lord Treasurer of England. His first two sons died as minors, John the eldest died as an infant in 1682, and the second, James, died unmarried in 1703, aged 19. In 1703 he purchased the manor of Molland-Champson from Sir Edward Hungerford (died 1711), husband of Jane Culme (1637–1674), sister and heiress of Richard II Culme (1635–1658/9). His heir was his 3rd son John Courtenay (1687–1732). His monument in Molland Church is inscribed as follows:

Here lyeth the body of John Courtenay of West Molland Esq.r. who died the 14th of Sep.ber 1724 aged 65; married Amy the 3d. daughter of the Right Hon.ble Thomas Lord Clifford Lord Treasu.r. of England in the time of King Charles ye second; she died An. Dom. 1693 aged 33 by whom he had issue six sons and three daughters; four of them are deceased; John the first born, James, Hugh and Charles who are all buryed here. Tis the request of John Courtenay Esq.r. who erected this monument ye neither his heirs or excequetors disturb the ashes of his honour'd father & mother.

On a roundel below:

Underneath lieth interr'd the body of George Courtenay, Gent. the second surviving son of the abovesaid Courtenay Esq. who dep.d. this life June 17, 1731 aged 30.

George married Mary Chichester, 3rd daughter of Sir Arthur Chichester, Baronet, of Youlston Park.

===== John V Courtenay (died 1732) =====
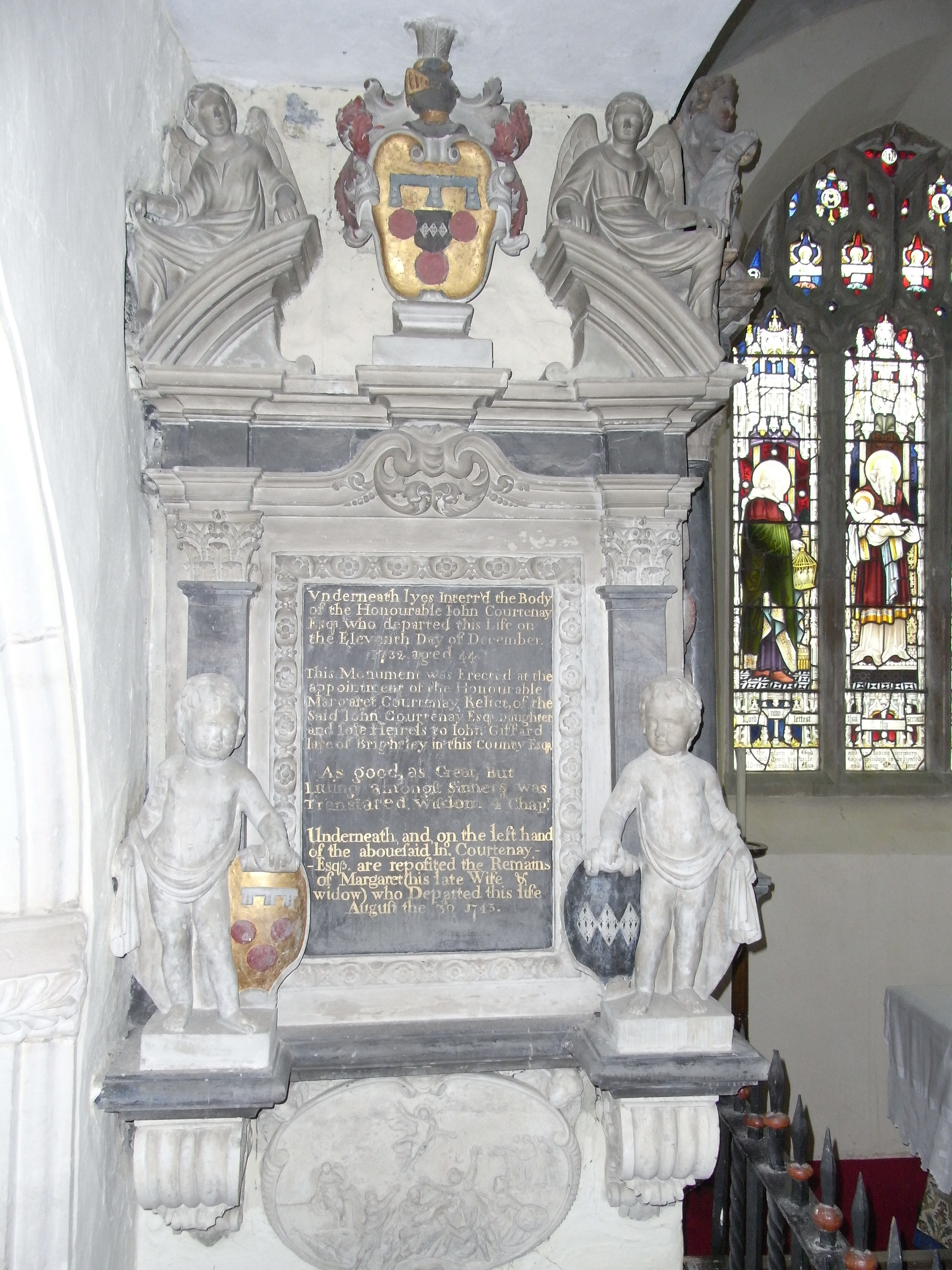
Monument to John Courtenay (died 1732)

John V Courtenay (1687–1732) (3rd and eldest surviving son), married Margaret Giffard (died 1743), daughter and sole heiress of John Giffard (1667/8-1704) of Brightley in the parish of Chittlehampton and lord of the manor of Chittlehampton. The marriage was without progeny, and thus John V was the last male of the Courtenays of Molland. His heir was his sister Mary Courtenay (1687-1747), the first wife of William Paston (1701–1769) of Horton Court in Gloucestershire, who married secondly in 1751 Mary Chichester, his widow's sister's sister-in-law. On the east wall to the north of the chancel is situated a mural monument to John V Courtenay (died 1732), inscribed as follows:

Underneath lyes interr'd the body of the Honourable John Courtenay Esq. who departed this life on the eleventh day of December 1732 aged 44. This monument was erected at the appointment of the Honourable Margaret Courtenay, relict of the said John Courtenay Esq. daughter and sole heiress to John Giffard late of Brightley in this county, Esq. "As good, as great, but living amongst sinners was translated" Wisdom 4th chap'r. Underneath and on the left hand of the abovesaid Jn. Courtenay Esq. are reposited the remains of Margaret (his late wife & widow) who departed this life August the 30th 1743.

The other surviving sister of John Courtenay (died 1732) was Elizabeth Courtenay (1693–1763), who married, as his first wife, John Chichester (1707–1783) of Arlington Court. The marriage was without progeny and he married again after her death. She inherited a moiety of her brother's estate.

==== Courtenay arms at West Molland ====
A heraldic achievement is sculpted on the north facade of West Molland Barton, above the front door. On a scroll below an escutcheon couché bearing three roundels a label of three points in chief each point charged with three roundels is the following legend in Roman capitals: “This is the armes of Hugh Courtny sometimes Earle of Devon who was grandfather unto Sr. Phillip Courtny of Mol.nd., knight” (sic). The tomb and effigies of the Earl and his wife Margaret Bohun, heiress of Powderham, can be seen in Exeter Cathedral. Shown as supporters are: dexter, the Bohun swan, sinister the boar of Courtenay. The crest of Courtenay is generally given as: out of a ducal coronet or, a plume of seven ostrich feathers four and three argent. The crest at West Molland shows 10 feathers, three, four, three. The second crest of the Courtenay Earls of Devon is: A dolphin embowed proper, which may be seen here behind the escutcheon.

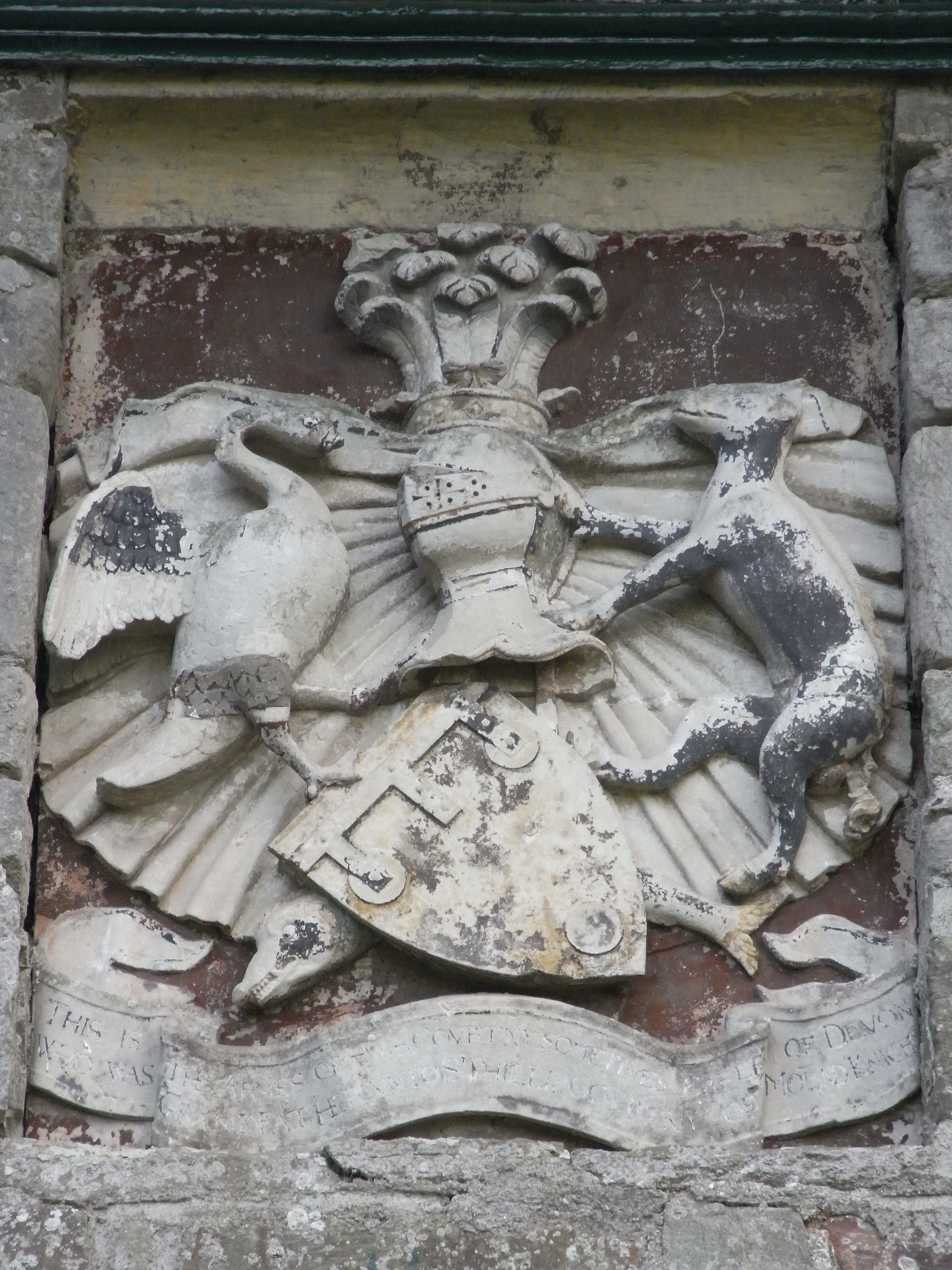
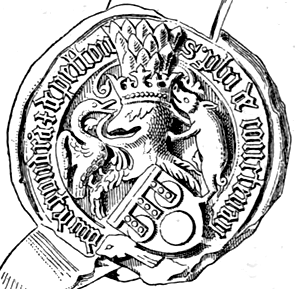
Left: Armorials of Courtenay above front door on north facade, West Molland Barton. Right: 1435–1436 Seal of Sir Philip Courtenay (d. 1463) of Powderham

==== Paston ====
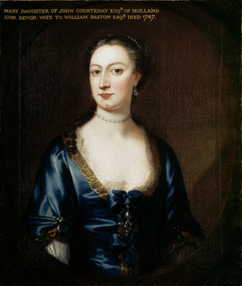
Mary daughter of John Courtenay Esq. of Molland com. Devon wife to William Paston Esq. Died 1747. Painted by Thomas Hudson (1701–1779). At Coughton Court, NTPL ref no: 58003

Mary Courtenay (bapt.1/2/1687, died 1747), married in 1725 William Paston (died 1769) of Horton Court near Chipping Sodbury, Gloucestershire. Mary Courtenay was said by the Antiquary Thomas Hearne (died 1735) to have been "a lady of great understanding and virtue". There is a monument to William Paston (died 1769) in Horton Church, where both he and his wife Mary Courtenay were buried. Their daughter Anne Maria Paston (born at Horton 22 January 1728), who was also a co-heiress of Thomas Arundell, 4th Baron Arundell of Wardour (1633–1712), married Sir George Throckmorton (1721–1767), only son of Sir Robert Throckmorton, 4th Baronet (died 1791), whom he predeceased. Molland manor thus passed into the Throckmorton family.

==== Throckmorton ====
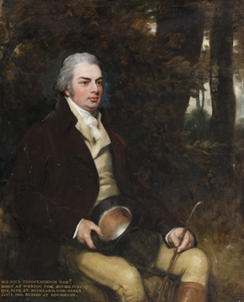
Sir John Throckmorton Bart. Born at Weston com. Bucks 27 July 1753 Died at... 3 Jan 1819 Buried at Coughton. Attributed to Thomas Phillips (1770–1845). At Coughton Court, Throckmorton Collection, owned by the National Trust. NTPL Ref. No.173362

Anne Maria Paston, heiress of Molland, married George Throckmorton (1721–1767), who did not live long enough to inherit the baronetcy from his own father, and was the mother of three Throckmorton baronets, none of whom produced surviving male progeny:

- Sir John Courtenay Throckmorton, 5th Baronet (1754–1819), of Coughton Court, Warwickshire. Born at Weston Underwood in Buckinghamshire.
- Sir George Courtenay Throckmorton, 6th Baronet (1754–1826), of Weston Underwood in Buckinghamshire, younger brother, who in 1792 assumed the surname "Courtenay" in lieu of his patronymic on inheriting Molland through his mother. Died without progeny. He chose not to reside at West Molland Barton, the ancient manor house of the Courtenays, and in 1807 he leased it to Rev. William Quartly, (1762-1816) one of that family famous for developing Red Devon Cattle at Molland, 3rd son of James Quartly (1720-1793) who having obtained the lease of Champson, (adjacent) had started to breed Devon Cattle there in 1776. in 1850 West Molland and Champson manor houses and estates were occupied respectively by William's nephews, the brothers James and John Quartly, "who are noted for their fine breed of North Devon cattle, for which they have obtained many prizes" (White's Devonshire Directory, 1850).
- Sir Charles Throckmorton, 7th Baronet (1757–1840), younger brother. He discontinued the surname of Courtenay adopted by his brother.
- Sir Robert George Throckmorton, 8th Baronet (1800–1862), nephew, son of William Throckmorton (1762–1819), youngest brother of the 7th Baronet.
- Sir Nicholas William George Throckmorton, 9th Baronet (1838–1919)
- Sir Richard Charles Acton Throckmorton, 10th Baronet (1839–1927)
- Sir Robert George Maxwell Throckmorton, 11th Baronet (1908–1989), grandson of the 10th baronet.
- Rev. Sir Anthony John Benedict Throckmorton, 12th Baronet (1916–1994), first cousin, a Roman Catholic priest. On his death unmarried and without progeny the title became extinct.

==== d'Abreu ====
(Elizabeth) Clare d'Abreu (1935–2017), ("Mrs McLaren-Throckmorton") eldest niece of 11th Baronet and heir to the estates of the 12th Baronet. She was the eldest of three daughters of the prominent surgeon Professor Alphonsus Ligouri d'Abreu, Lt. Col. Royal Army Medical Corps, OBE, MB, CBE, FRCS, by his wife Elizabeth Ursula Arienwen Throckmorton (1906- ), sister of the 11th Baronet. She was a barrister specialising in European Community Law with a particular interest in competition law. She served on the Monopolies and Mergers Commission and on the Financial Intermediaries, Managers and Brokers Regulatory Association (FIMBRA). She relinquished her non-executive directorship of the Birmingham Royal Ballet Trust Company. She was a non-executive director of Severn Trent Water. In 1958 she married Alan George Tritton, CBE, DL, of Lyons Hall, Great Leighs, Chelmsford, Essex, and of Flood St, Chelsea, London, a director of Barclays Bank, High Sheriff of Essex 1992, CBE June 1999 for services to Anglo-Indial relations & preservation of the cultural heritage. By her first husband she had progeny but they were divorced in 1970. She married secondly John Andrew McLaren (1932–2007), and later changed her surname to McLaren-Throckmorton. Although she has two sons she left Molland to her daughter and eldest child Christina Margaret Tritton.

==== Tritton ====
Christina Margaret Tritton (b.1960), ("Mrs Williams"), daughter and eldest child, of Gourte Farm, Molland, the owner of Molland Estate in 2018. In 1984 she married Rupert Birch, by whom she had a son Magnus Courtenay Birch (born 1987). She married secondly in 1993 Adam Benedict Nicholas Williams (b.1959), son of the diplomat Sir Anthony Williams (b.1923) and Hedwig, Countess von Neipperg, by whom she had further progeny. She is a garden designer who trained at the English Gardening School in London. At the 2010 Chelsea Flower Show won Gold Medal and Best in Category for "Urban Courtyard". In 2015 she won The Exmoor Society's Samuel Foss Conservation Award for having established a five-year project called "Grazing the Moor" to monitor the impact of changes to the grazing regime on Molland Moor, including the introduction of winter grazing by cattle on the moor. The hope is that, through the experiment, winter grazing will begin a long-awaited fight-back against the explosion of gorse, bracken and Molinia grass that is threatening the moor’s character". Since 2004 she has been a director of the Badgworthy Land Company, which controls hunting rights on Exmoor.

=== Molland-Champson ===
==== Domesday Book, Molland-Champson ====
Text of Exeter Domesday Book of 1086, under the heading: "Land of the Bishop of Coutances in Devrescira", regarding the manor later called "Molland-Champson"

The text of the Exeter Domesday Book of 1086, under the heading: "Land of the Bishop of Coutances (i.e. Geoffrey de Montbray) in Devrescira" is as follows (English translation):

The bishop has a manor called "Mollanda" which Ulwena held TRE and it paid geld for ½ hide. This 4 ploughs can till. Drogo holds it of the bishop. Thereof Drogo has 1 virgate and 1 plough in demesne and the villeins 1 virgate and 1 plough. There Drogo has 3 villeins, 4 bordars, 2 serfs, 8 beasts, 10 swine, 40 sheep, 30 acres of woodland and 1 ½ acres of meadow. Worth 25s. And it was worth the same when the bishop received it.

==== de Champeaus ====
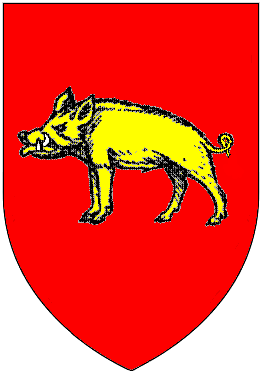
Arms of de Champeaux of Molland: Gules, a boar passant or tusked argent

The earliest recorded tenant of Molland-Champson, to which estate it gave its name, was the family of de Champeaux, Latinized to de Campellis ("from the little fields"), alias de Champeaus or de Campell. "Robert de Chaumpians" was a witness to a donation made in the Devon County Court on 23 November 1192 by Martin Oisun to Martin de Fissacre. In the deed dated 28 January 1196 which solved the dispute between the de Tracy and Braose families, both heirs to the feudal barony of Barnstaple, the subsidiary manors of the barony were split between the two, and listed. One of the manors which went to Oliver de Tracy, the son of Henry de Tracy, was "Loxbeare", which was then described as held by William de Champels for the service of one knight's fee.

In 1202 a law-suit is recorded in the Devon Feet of Fines in which Oliver de Tracy, feudal baron of Barnstaple, demanded feudal service of seven knights from William de Champeaus in respect of the following manors held by him from the barony:

- Bonlege (Bondleigh)
- Stodleg (Stoodleigh)
- Modland (Molland-Champson)
- Aiwis (Huish Beaupel, Instow)
- Hamtoneford (Handsford, Ashreigney)
- Bettenden (Bittadon)
- Anestinges (Anstey Money in West Anstey)
- Lockesbere (Loxbeare)
- Pedehill (Peadhill, Tiverton)

William replied that under the terms of his feudal tenure he owed his overlord de Tracy the service of only four knights.

A further legal suit heard before the Justices Itinerant of King Henry III at Exeter on 24 April 1219 is recorded between John Malherbe and Sibilla his wife, and widow of Nicholas de Champellis, against William de Champellis; She claimed as part of her customary dower (comprising 1/3 of her husband's lands) the township of "Harewde" (West Horwood) and "Moulande". William paid her 4 marks of silver to settle her claim and retained possession of the lands.

A later legal case is recorded, heard before the Justices Itinerant at Reading on 5 July 1248. Robert de Champeaus had granted by gift a moiety of the manor of "Stodlegh" (East Stoodleigh) to Robert FitzPain under the tenure of grand sergeanty comprising the payment of one pair of white gloves or 1 penny due annually on the feast of St Michael, and also of performing the overseas military service which was due by the holder of the manor to the king. The dispute was settled by payment of 100 shillings sterling by FitzPain to de Champeaus.

The 1285 landholdings of Geoffrey de Camville (died 1308), jure uxoris feudal baron of Barnstaple included under the heading "hundred of South Molton: "Champeleston, 1/2 a knight's fee in capite. The name of his tenant was not given. Robert de Champeaux (died 1325), was Abbot of Tavistock, but it is not known if he was related to the Molland family.

==== de Whiteby ====
In 1326 it was held as one knight's fee from the feudal barony of Barnstaple, the lord of which was William II FitzMartin, who died sine prole in 1326. His inquisition post mortem lists all his land-holdings including under the section "Fees pertaining to the barony of Barnstaple": Mollond Champens 1 fee held by John de Whiteby".

==== Culme ====
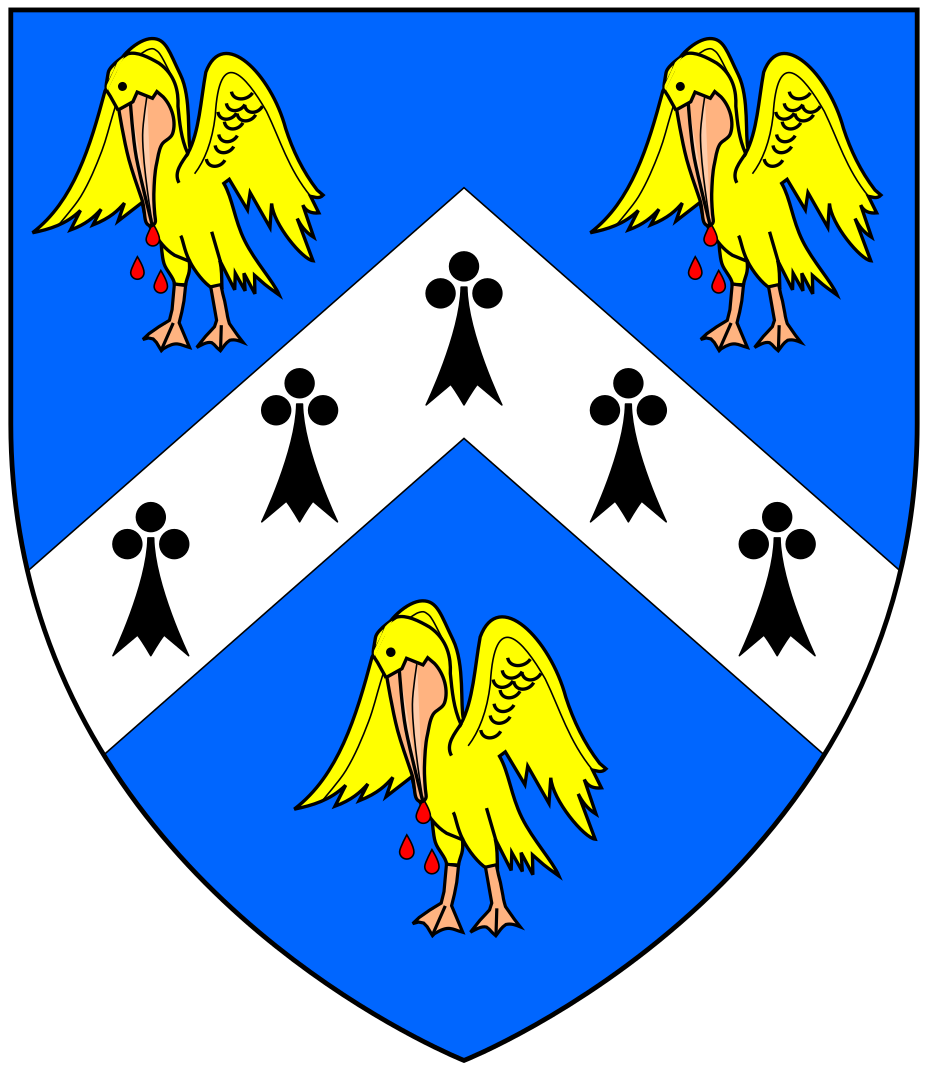
Arms of Culme: Azure, a chevron ermine between 3 pelicans vulning their breasts or

The small manor of Molland-Champson was acquired at some time before 1514 by the Culme family (or "Columb", "Culem", "Colyn", "Culine" etc.), of Winkleigh, but in 1703 was acquired from their heir by the Courtenays of Molland-Bottreaux, who thus unified the manor. According to Risdon the family may have derived its name from some ancient landholding in the area of the River Culm. The family acquired Canonsleigh Abbey in Burlescombe parish, Devon, after the Dissolution of the Monasteries in the 16th century, and also then acquired the advowson of Molland and Knowstone churches from Hartland Abbey, which had received the same by the gift of de Botreaux in the 12th century. Canons Leigh Barton (or "Canonsleigh") was in the 16th. and 17th. centuries a residence of the family as well as Great Champson (or "Chamston"), the manor house of Molland-Champson manor. The family is generally said to have died out in the male line on the death of Richard II Culme (1635–1658/9) in 1658, although the Rev. John Culme (died 1691), vicar of the united parishes of Knowstone-cum-Molland, of which the Culme family held the advowson, died later in 1691, to whom a mural monument exists in Knowstone church in the chancel to the south of the altar, and the text of whose funeral sermon has survived in records. The Heralds' Visitations of Devon give the descent as follows:

===== Hugh I Culme =====
Hugh I Culme, of Winkleigh, Escheator of Devon in 1505. He is recorded on the Pardon Roll of King Henry VIII during the years 1509–1514 as "Hugh Culme of South Molton and Molland Champiaux". He was the son of John II Culme of Winkleigh who was himself the son of John I Culme of Winkleigh, Sergeant at Law.

===== John III Culme (died 1526) =====
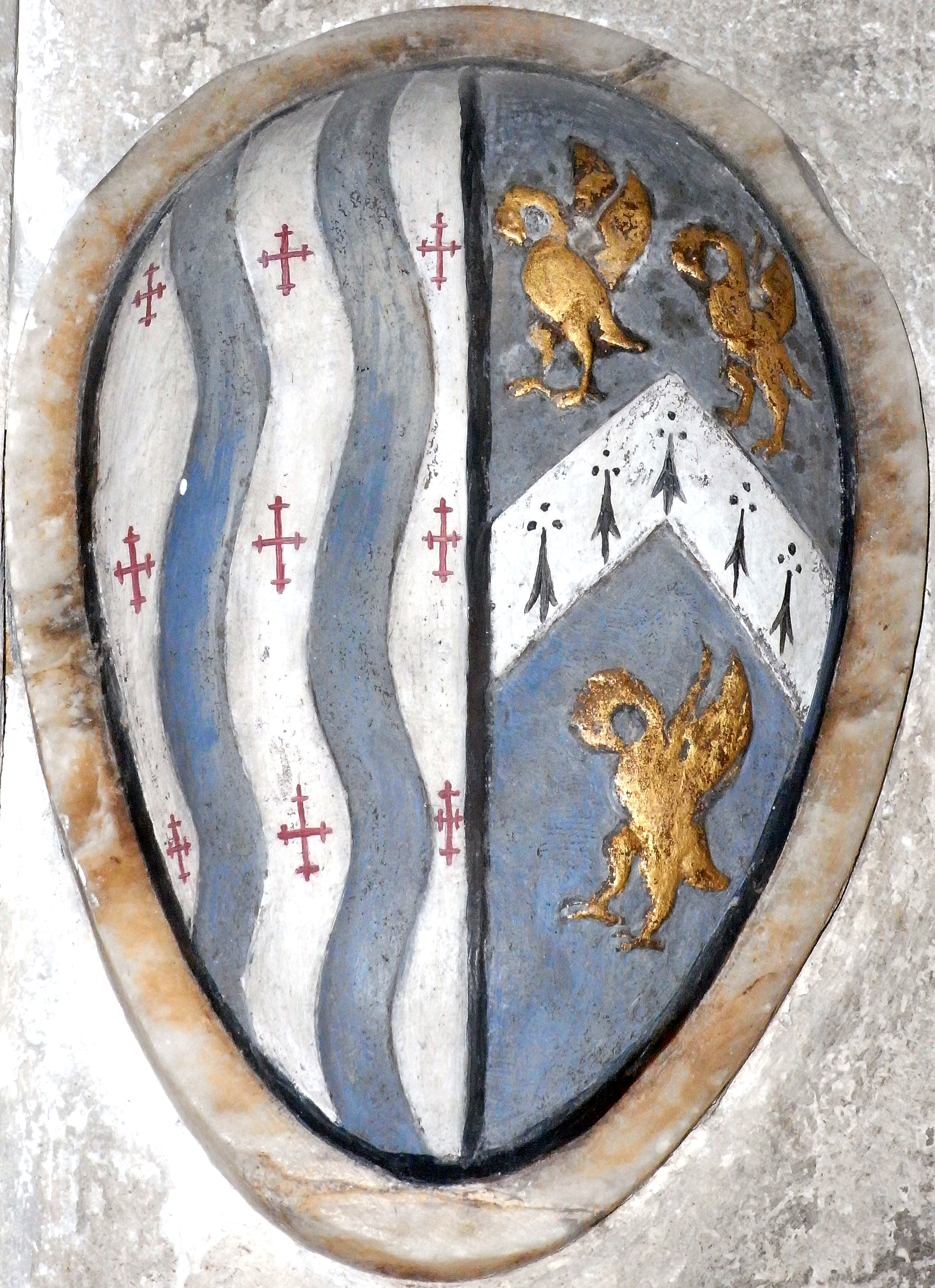
Heraldic cartouche on monument to Sir John Dodderidge (1555–1628), Justice of the King's Bench, Lady Chapel of Exeter Cathedral, showing arms of Dodderidge (Argent, two pales wavy azure between nine crosses croslet gules) impaling the arms of his third wife Anne Culme, grand-daughter of Hugh II Culme (died 1545) of Molland-Champson (Azure, a chevron ermine between 3 pelicans vulning their breasts or)

John III Culme (died 1526), MP for Barnstaple in 1512. The Visitations of Devon gives his father as Hugh Culme, husband of Alice Tracey (daughter of William Tracey of Gloucester), whilst Hawkyard (1982) gives his father as John Culme husband of Avys. John III Culme married Alice Walter, the daughter and heiress of John Walter of Combe Walter in the parish of Abbotsham, near Bideford, by his wife Alice Collacot, daughter and heiress of John Collacot of Collacot in the parish of Winkleigh. She remarried secondly to Thomas Westcott of Raddon.

===== Hugh II Culme (died 1545) =====
Hugh II Culme (died 1545) (son) was a minor at the death of his father and in 1526 was awarded in wardship to George Rolle of Stevenstone. As patron he presented an incumbent to Molland Church in 1532. He married Agnes Frye, daughter of William Frye of Yarty in the parish of Membury. She survived him and remarried to John Willoughby (1509–1558) of Efford in the parish of Shobrooke, near Crediton, which family also became influential in the parish of Molland, holding the advowson, alternately with Culme. John Willoughby appointed the incumbent to Knowstone-cum-Molland in 1559(sic). The Molland-Champson family were descended from Sir John Willoughby, the 3rd son of John de Willoughby, 3rd Baron Willoughby de Eresby (1329–1372). In 1567 Hugh II's daughter Agnes Culme married Richard Willoughby (d.1602), her step-father's son, and bore him 11 children. In 1583 Richard Willoughby "clothier of Molland and Exeter", purchased the estate of "La Hill" (Leyhill) in Payhembury, near Honiton. His household accounts during the years 1644-6 and some correspondence survive in the Somerset Record Office. Their eldest son was John Willoughby (died 1658) whose daughter Anne married Amias Bampfylde, the 4th son of Sir Amyas Bampfylde (died 1626) of the near-by manor of North Molton, whose effigy exists in North Molton Church. John Willoughby (died 1658) married secondly his daughter's young niece Elizabeth Bampfylde, sister of Sir John Bampfylde, 1st Baronet (c. 1610 – 1650). One of his younger sons, Nicholas Culme, had a daughter Anne Culme who was the third wife of the highly influential Sir John Doddridge (1555–1628), Justice of the King's Bench and Member of Parliament, whose second wife had been Dorothy Bampfylde, a daughter of Sir Amyas Bampfylde (died 1626). His monument with reclining effigy is situated in the Lady Chapel of Exeter Cathedral and displays on a cartouche his own arms impaled with Culme. Next to it is a separate monument with effigy of Dorothy Bampfylde.

===== Hugh III Culme (died 1618) =====
Hugh III Culme (died 1618) (son). In 1547 he was patron of Molland cum Knowstone Church and appointed John Husband as rector. He presented next also in 1554, appointing Walter Mugg. In 1564 he was granted arms by William Harvey, Clarenceux King of Arms: Azure, a chevron ermine between 3 pelicans vulning their breast or, with a canting crest: On a wreath a lion leaning to a column argent (given alternatively as: A lion sejant proper supporting a corinthian column). He married in 1568 Mary Fortescue (died 1623), a daughter of Richard Fortescue (c. 1517 – 1570) of Filleigh, head of one of the leading gentry families of Devon. In 1597 he enfeoffed Philip Courtenay of Molland with certain lands unknown, probably representing the family's sale of some of its Molland lands and the removal of its primary residence to Canonsleigh. In 1610 he received letters patent, for purposes unknown, from King James I. His younger son was Benjamin Culme (died 1657), BA (1602) St Alban's Hall, Oxford, Dean of St Patrick's Cathedral, Dublin, Ireland, who died at Lydiard St John's, Wiltshire, in 1657, aged 76, having escaped from political disturbances in Ireland. His daughter Elizabeth Culme married John Morton (c. 1628 – 1699), MP.

===== Richard I Culme (1569–1649) =====
Richard I Culme (1569–1649) also of Canonsleigh Abbey, Burlescombe, Devon (eldest son), was admitted for his law studies to the Inner Temple in 1591. He was Sheriff of Devon in 1642 during the critical period leading up to the armed conflict of the Civil War. He was appointed by King Charles I one of the 28 Commissioners of Array for Devon ordered to raise troops in the county for the Royalist cause. In the company of his neighbour Henry Ayshford (d.1649) of Ayshford in Burlescombe he attempted to read his commission to a public gathering in his local town of Cullompton, near Canonsleigh Abbey, but was met with strong opposition from the community. On the sudden appearance on the scene in his support of Henry Bourchier, 5th Earl of Bath with a body of cavaliers, the population became greatly alarmed and started to arm and reinforce their town's defences. He married in 1596 Lydia Courtenay, daughter of Philip Courtenay of Molland Bottreaux. As patron of the living he made a presentation to the rectory of Molland and Knowstone in 1626. In 1634 "Richard Culme of Cannonleigh" leased to Andrew Wood of Uplowman, Devon, yeoman, a messuage and land in "Wood" in Molland (-Champson), which farm exists today.

===== Hugh IV Culme (1601–1643/4) =====
Hugh IV Culme (1601–1643/4) (son), admitted for his legal education to the Inner Temple in London in 1621. He married firstly Amy Ayshford (d.1630/1) daughter of his neighbour at Canonsleigh Henry Ayshford of Ayshford in the parish of Burlescombe, and secondly "Susanna" (died 1639).

===== Richard II Culme (1635–1658/9) =====
Richard II Culme (1635–1658/9) (son), died without progeny, the last of the senior line of Culme. His heir was his sister Jane Culme (1637–1674), who married at Burlescombe in 1666 the profligate Sir Edward Hungerford (died 1711), MP. His second sister Amy Culme (1638/9-1658) died in 1658. Hungerford was thus patron of Molland cum Knowstone church in 1672 when he appointed a certain John Culme (died 1691) as rector. John Culme was probably a cousin, and is not listed in the pedigree in the heraldic visitation. His mural monument exists in Knowstone Church, on the south wall of the chancel.

==== Courtenay ====
In 1703 Sir Edward Hungerford sold the Culme estates inherited from his wife to John IV Courtenay (died 1724) of Molland. It was thus an extraordinary coincidence that the Courtenay family acquired both the Domesday Book manors of Molland from members of the Hungerford family. It is generally said of Hungerford that his own extravagance was his downfall, but it was claimed by others that his huge debts were inherited from his own father Anthony Hungerford and from his father-in-law Sir John Hele of Wembury, who had incurred them during the Civil War supporting the Royalist cause. Indeed an Act of Parliament mentioning these reasons was obtained by Hungerford in 1675/6 specifically allowing him to sell the manors inherited from Hele. The acquisition of Molland Champson was initially as a year's lease then as a sale, as the following catalogued deed dated 8 March 1702/3 relates:

Lease for a year from John Pollexfen of Wembury, Devon, esq., Sir Edward Hungerford, knt. and others to John Courtenay of West Molland esq. of 2 messuages called Great and Little Champson in Molland, messuages called South Lishwell, East Gatcombe, Whiteleigh, North Lishwell, and Middle Champson, 3 messuages called Wood, Catts and Pipers and 2 water mills called Wade Mills, all in Molland; cottages called Vicars Cott, and messuages called Harpson and West Hole in Knowstone; a messuage called Swincombe and chief rent from a messuage called Ditchett in Rose Ash; 3 messuages in South Molton; perpetual advowson of Molland and Knowstone, and the manor of Molland Champson alias Champeaux. The great tithes of Molland and Knowstone and certain messuages (listed) excepted.

The manor of Wembury had been inherited from Hungerford's previous wife Jane Hele, sole daughter and heiress of Sir John Hele, and had been sold by Hungerford in 1686 to John Pollexfen, merchant. A draft conveyance for the same properties dated 9 March 1702/3 also exists in the Throckmorton archives. Following his purchase John Courtenay "of West Molland" immediately let out Great Champson on a 99 year lease, in September 1703, to James Quartley of Exton, Somerset, who developed there his famous breed of red Devon Cattle. After the death of John Courtenay the Quartleys eventually obtained a lease of West Molland itself, where they expanded their cattle business. John Courtenay at the same time let out on a 99 year lease "the messuage and lands" of Little Champson to John Newton of Molland, tanner, and the messuage and lands of Middle Champson he let out for 99 years to Richard Moore of Molland, yeoman.

== Archives ==
- Throckmorton Archives. Archive historical documents relating to Molland covering dates c. 1230 – 1880 are held by Warwickshire Archives ("Shakespeare Centre Library and Archive"), under ref DR5. The collection was deposited in instalments by Sir Robert Throckmorton between 1936 and 1960 having been accepted by the Commissioners of Inland Revenue in lieu of inheritance tax in 1997.
- Archives of Crosse and Wyatt, solicitors, South Molton, held at North Devon Record Office

== Sources ==
- Vivian, J.L., Lt.-Col., The Visitations of the County of Devon comprising the Heralds' Visitations of 1531, 1564 & 1620, Exeter, 1895
- Rogers, W.H. Hamilton, The Antient Sepulchral Effigies and Monumental and Memorial Sculpture of Devon, Exeter, 1877, pp. 384–386, Courtenay, Molland-Bottreaux. Contains transcripts of several of the inscriptions on the Courtenay monuments in Molland Church.
