= Mary Hungerford =

- Born: c.1468
- Died: before 10 July 1533
- Spouses: Edward Hastings, 2nd Baron Hastings; Sir Richard Sacheverell
- Issue: George Hastings, 1st Earl of Huntingdon; William Hastings; Anne Hastings
- Father: Sir Thomas Hungerford
- Mother: Anne Percy

Mary Hungerford, Baroness Botreaux, Hungerford and Moleyns (c.1468 – before 10 July 1533) was the daughter of Sir Thomas Hungerford and Anne, daughter of Henry Percy, 3rd Earl of Northumberland.

== Titles ==
Mary became suo jure 5th Baroness Botreaux on the death of her great-grandmother, Margaret Botreaux, in 1478.

Mary was the great-granddaughter of Sir William Moleyns, slain at the siege of Orleans on 8 May 1429, who married, on 1 May 1423, as his second wife, Anne Whalesborough (died c. 1487), the daughter and co-heir of John Whalesborough, esquire, of Whalesborough, Cornwall, by Joan, daughter of Sir John Raleigh. By Anne Whalesborough Sir William Moleyns had two daughters, Eleanor (died c. 1492) and Frideswide. Eleanor's marriage was granted to Thomas Chaucer, esquire, and before 5 November 1440 she married Robert Hungerford, 3rd Baron Hungerford, who was beheaded at Newcastle on 17 May 1464 after the Battle of Hexham. He was attainted, as was his son, Sir Thomas Hungerford (executed 1469), whereby all their honours became forfeited. On 7 November 1485 the attainders were reversed, and Mary became, in addition to her title of Baroness Botreaux, suo jure Baroness Hungerford and Moleyns.

== Marriage and children ==
By papal dispensation dated 4 September 1475, Mary married Edward Hastings, 2nd Baron Hastings, son of William Hastings, 1st Baron Hastings, and Katherine Neville, daughter of Richard Neville, 5th Earl of Salisbury. Katherine was the widow of William Bonville, 6th Baron Harington. Edward Hastings and Mary Hungerford had two sons and a daughter:

- George Hastings, 1st Earl of Huntingdon (1488 – 24 March 1544), who married, about December 1509, Anne Stafford, widow of Sir Walter Herbert (d. 16 September 1507), and daughter of Henry Stafford, 2nd Duke of Buckingham, by Katherine Woodville.
- William Hastings.
- Anne Hastings (buried 17 November 1550), who married Thomas Stanley, 2nd Earl of Derby (d. 23 May 1521), by whom she had three sons, John, Edward Stanley, 3rd Earl of Derby, and Henry, and a daughter, Margaret, who married Robert Radcliffe, 1st Earl of Sussex.

Mary married, secondly, on 1 May 1509, Sir Richard Sacheverell (d. 14 April 1534), second son of Ralph Sacheverell of Morley, Derbyshire, by whom she had no issue. Mary was living 30 June 1530, and died before 10 July 1533. She and her second husband were buried in the Collegiate Church of St. Mary in the Newarke (Newarke College) in Leicester.

== Ancestry ==
Ancestors of Mary Hungerford

16. Walter Hungerford, 1st Baron Hungerford
8. Robert Hungerford, 2nd Baron Hungerford
17. Catherine Peverell
4. Robert Hungerford, 3rd Baron Hungerford
18. William de Botreaux
9. Margaret Hungerford, 4th Baroness Botreaux
19. Elizabeth de Beaumont
2. Thomas Hungerford of Rowden
20. Sir William Moleyns
10. Sir William Moleyns
21. Katherine Fauconer
5. Eleanor Moleyns
22. John Whalesborough
11. Anne Whalesborough
23. Joan Raleigh
1. Mary Hungerford
24. Henry Hotspur Percy
12. Henry Percy, 2nd Earl of Northumberland
25. Elizabeth Mortimer
6. Henry Percy, 3rd Earl of Northumberland
26. Ralph Nevill, 1st Earl of Westmorland
13. Eleanor Percy, Countess of Northumberland
27. Joan Beaufort, Countess of Westmorland
3. Lady Anne Percy
28. Robert de Poynings
14. Sir Richard de Poynings
29. Margaret Squery
7. Eleanor de Poynings, Baroness de Poynings
30. Henry Seamer
15. Jean Seamer
31.
