= Richard Sacheverell =

16th-century English politician

Sir Richard Sacheverell (by 1469 – 14 April 1534), of Church of the Annunciation of Our Lady of the Newarke (Newarke College), Leicester, and Ratcliffe-upon-Soar, Nottinghamshire, was an English politician.

He was the son of Ralph Sacheverell of Morley, Derbyshire. In 1509, he married Mary Hungerford, suo jure Baroness Botreaux, Hungerford and Moleyns, the daughter and heiress of Sir Thomas Hungerford and widow of Edward Hastings, 2nd Baron Hastings. Both Sacherevell and his wife were well known at the English court.

In 1513, he took part in the war in France, where he was treasurer of the war, and was knighted in the same year. He was present at the Field of the Cloth of Gold in 1520 and at the reception for Charles V, Holy Roman Emperor, in England in 1522. In 1522, he was in command of a substantial cavalry unit in the north of England.

He was a knight of the shire (MP) for Leicestershire in 1523 (probably) and 1529.

On his death in 1534, he was buried alongside his wife in the College of the Annunciation of St Mary in the Newarke, Leicester (Newarke College), where they had lived for many years. He was survived by his wife's two sons, including George Hastings, 1st Earl of Huntingdon, and a daughter.
