= Sir John Throckmorton, 5th Baronet =

Sir John Throckmorton, 5th Bt
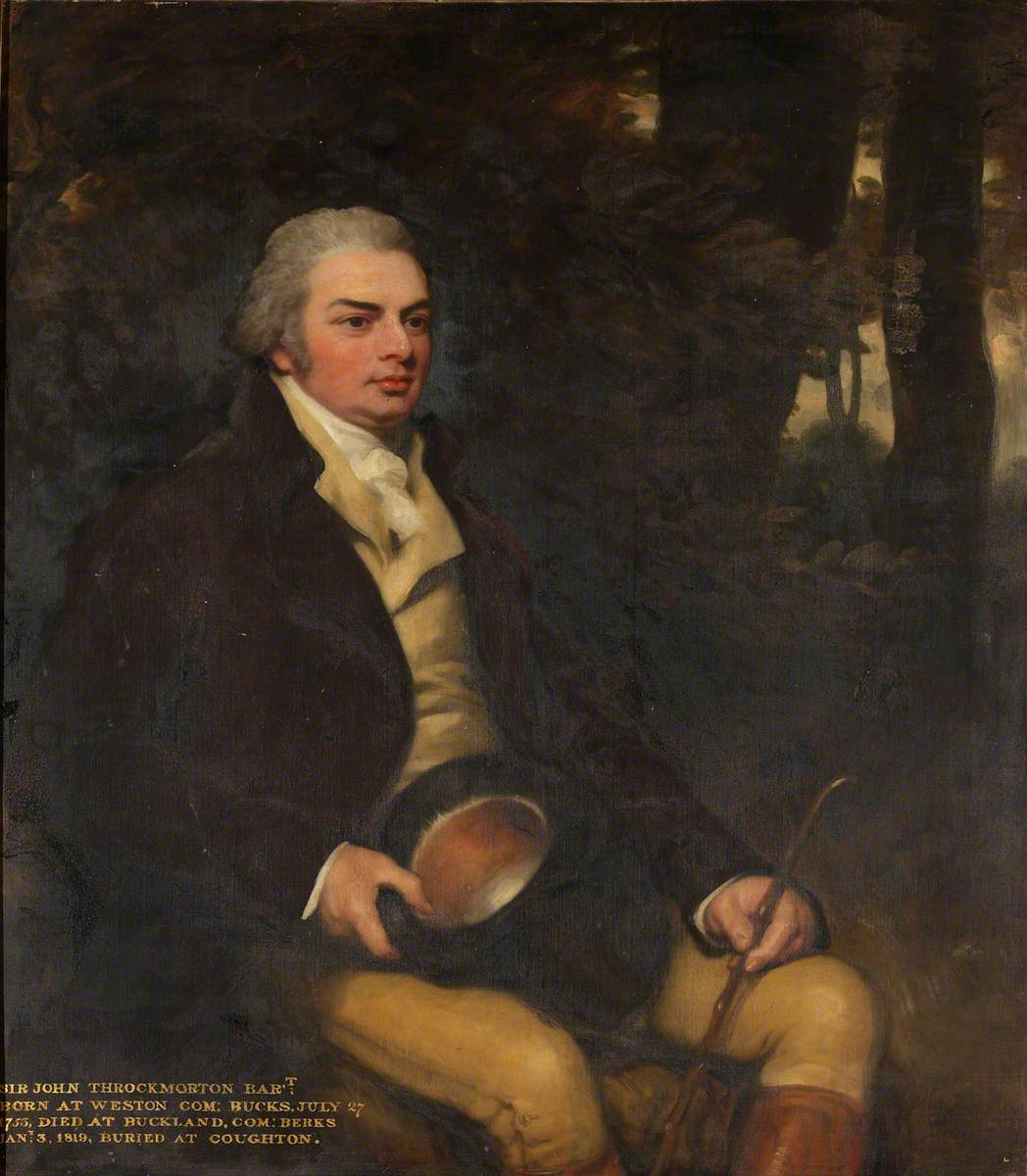
- Portrait of Sir John Throckmorton, 5th Baronet, by Thomas Phillips, between c. 1795 and c. 1797}
- Born: John Courtenay Throckmorton; 27 July 1753
- Died: 3 January 1819 (aged 65)
- Spouse: Maria Catherine Giffard (m. 1782; died 1819)
- Parent(s): George Throckmorton; Anne Maria Paston
- Relatives: Sir Robert Throckmorton, 4th Baronet (grandfather); Sir Robert Throckmorton, 8th Baronet (nephew)

Sir John Courtenay Throckmorton, 5th Baronet (27 July 1753 – 3 January 1819), was a member of a prominent English family of Roman Catholic dissenters and "its only published author of any significance."

== Early life ==
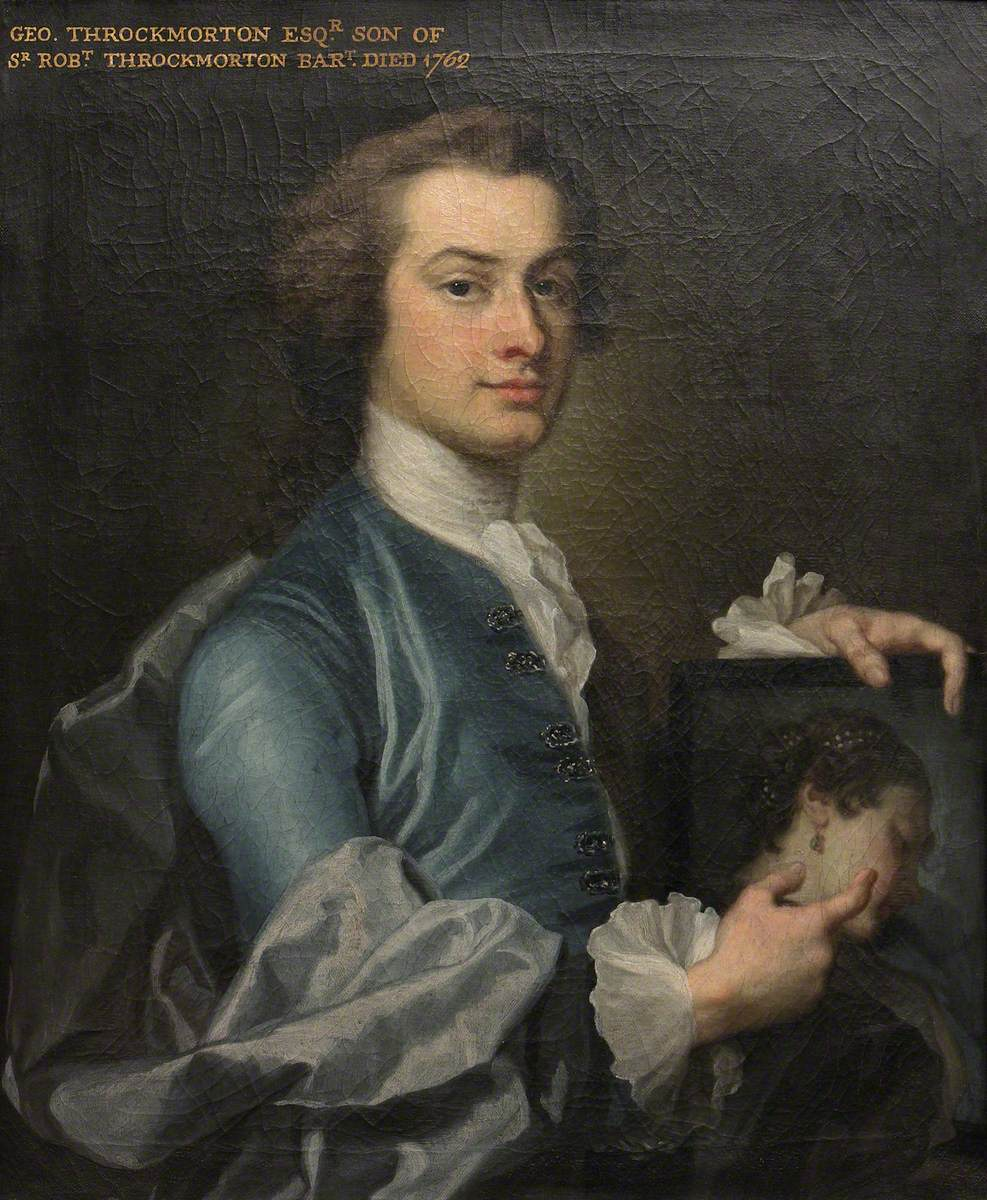
Portrait of his father, George, by George Knapton, between c. 1740 and c. 1745

Throckmorton was born on 27 July 1753 into a wealthy and staunchly Roman Catholic family. (Note: At the time of his birth, Roman Catholics "could not vote, study at Oxford or Cambridge, become an MP, hold public office or serve in the Army; they were also subject to heavy fines if they failed regularly to attend an Anglican Church..") He was the second son of George Throckmorton and Anne Maria (née Paston) Throckmorton. His elder brother, Robert Throckmorton, died unmarried in 1779. Among his siblings were Teresa Throckmorton (wife of Thomas Metcalf), Sir George Courtenay-Throckmorton, 6th Baronet (who married Catherine Stapleton), Sir Charles Throckmorton, 7th Baronet (who married Mary Margaretta Plowden), William Throckmorton (who married Frances Giffard and was the father of Sir Robert Throckmorton, 8th Baronet).

His father was the eldest surviving son of Sir Robert Throckmorton, 4th Baronet and, his first wife, Lady Theresa Herbert (a daughter of William Herbert, 2nd Marquess of Powis and the former Mary Preston). His maternal grandparents were William Paston of Horton Court and Mary (née Courtenay) Paston. Through his father's marriage to his mother, the Throckmorton family acquired the Manor of Molland in Devon.

Throckmorton went to school in the 1760s with the English Benedictines at St Gregory's in Douai, France before embarking on the grand tour centered on Rome in the 1770s. He was awarded the honorary degree of Doctor of Civil Law by Oxford University on 15 June 1796.

== Career ==
On 3 June 1782, Throckmorton was elected as a member of the Catholic Committee which sought to further the achievements of the 1778 Papists Act through "emphasizing the independence of English Catholics from papal control".

He succeeded his grandfather as the 5th Baronet Throckmorton, of Coughton on 9 December 1791. After inheriting the baronetcy, Sir John set up home at Buckland House in Berkshire, and his younger brother, George, moved into Weston Underwood.

In c. 1795–1797 or 1811, Sir John's portrait was painted by Thomas Phillips, RA. The painting is a "three-quarter-length portrait" while Sir John is "in brown coat and buff breeches. He is seated in landscape holding his hat and stick and possibly wearing the Throckmorton coat."

In 1806, Sir John published a book entitled Considerations arising from the debates in Parliament on the petition of the Irish Catholics by Sir John Throckmorton, Bart. He was also a "prodigious diary keeper, many of which remain in the Warwickshire County Council – County Record Office."

=== Freemasonry ===
In 1791, Throckmorton was installed as Master of the Royal Lodge before he went on his second European Tour. During the Tour, he left Paris only two days before the Insurrection of 10 August 1792, when armed revolutionaries in Paris stormed the Tuileries Palace. Sir John and his wife escaped to Switzerland but, eventually, returned to England by August 1793. In 1796, Throckmorton, an active Freemason, was appointed the first Provincial Grand Master of Buckinghamshire. Before his death in 1819, the only lodge in Buckinghamshire was the Etonian Lodge, which had been formed in 1813. He was also appointed as Provincial Grand Master of Berkshire, in 1817, although the two Provinces continued to operate separately.

== Personal life ==
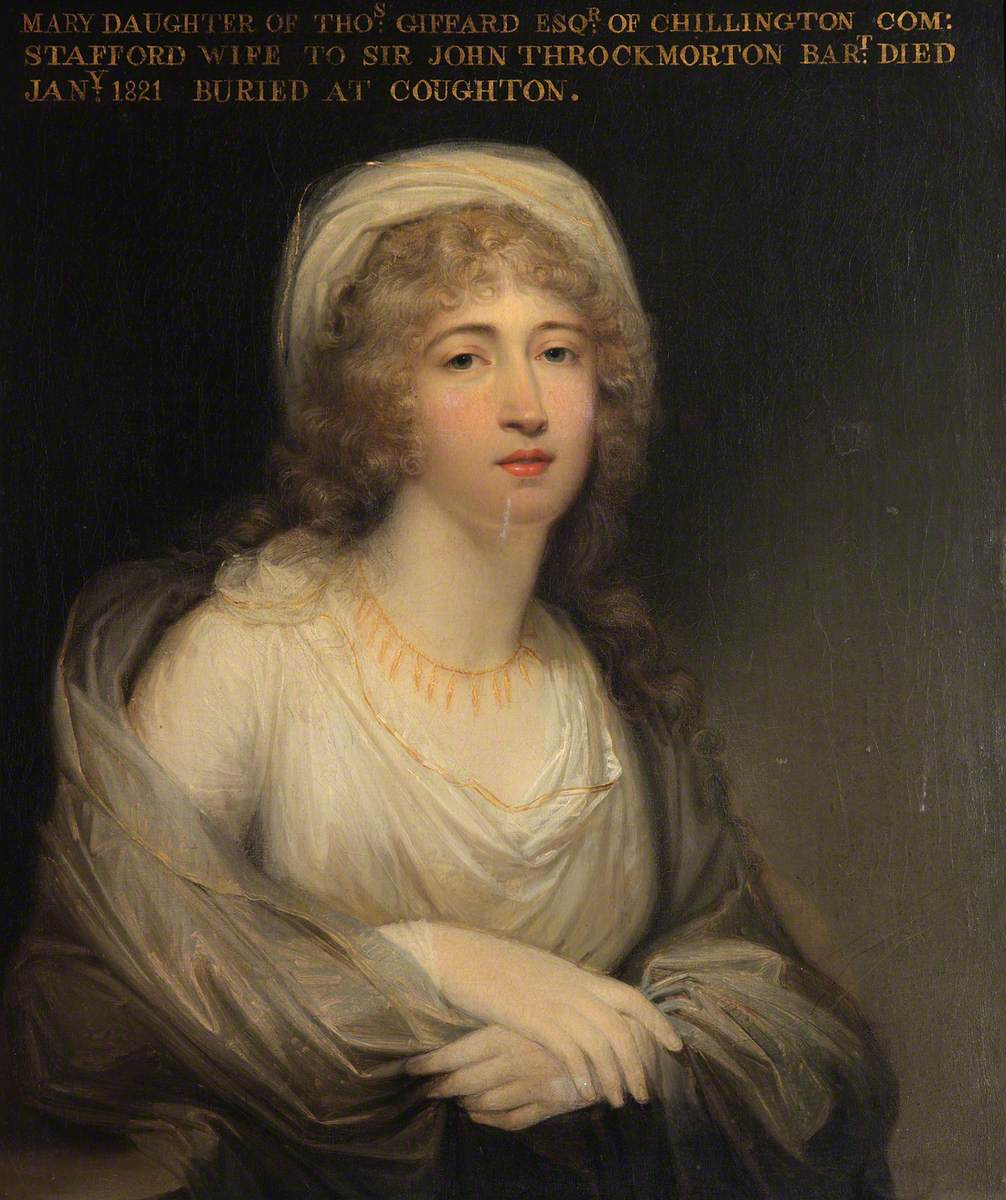
Portrait of his wife, Lady Throckmorton, c. 1800

In 1778 Throckmorton took up residence at Weston House, Weston Underwood, one of his family's estates in Buckinghamshire. On 19 August 1782, he was married to Maria Catherine Giffard (1762–1821), a daughter of Thomas Giffard, 22nd of Chillington and Hon. Barbara Petre (a daughter of the 8th Baron Petre), at Ilmington, Warwickshire. His aunt, Barbara Throckmorton, had been married to Thomas Giffard, 22nd of Chillington.

Sir John died, without issue, on 3 January 1819 at age 65. He was succeeded in the baronetcy by his younger brother, George Courtenay-Throckmorton.

Baronetage of England
Preceded by Robert Throckmorton	Baronet (of Coughton); 1791–1819	Succeeded by George Courtenay-Throckmorton
