= Robert Hungerford, 3rd Baron Hungerford =

English nobleman

Coordinates: 51°03′53″N 1°47′51″W

Robert Hungerford
- Baron Hungerford
- Arms of Hungerford: Sable, two bars argent in chief three plates
- Tenure: 1459–1469
- Successor: Mary, 4th Baroness Hungerford
- Other titles: Baron Moleyns
- Born: c. 1429; England
- Died: 17 May 1464 (aged c. 35); Newcastle, Northumberland
- Buried: Salisbury Cathedral
- Wars and battles: Wars of the Roses; Battle of Towton (1461); Battle of Hexham (1464)
- Spouse: Eleanor Moleyns
- Issue: Thomas of Rowden; Walter of Farleigh
- Parents: Robert, 2nd Baron Hungerford; Margaret Botreaux

Robert Hungerford, 3rd Baron Hungerford (c.1429 – 17 May 1464), known as Lord Moleyns from 1445 until the death of his father in 1459, was an English nobleman. He supported the Lancastrian cause in the Wars of the Roses. In the late 1440s and early 1450s he was a member of successive parliaments. He was a prisoner of the French for much of the 1450s until his mother arranged a payment of a 7,966l ransom. In 1461, after defeat at the Battle of Towton on 29 March, he fled with Henry VI to Scotland. In 1461 he was attainted in Edward IV's first parliament and was executed in Newcastle soon after he was captured at the Battle of Hexham.

== Origins ==
Hungerford was the son and heir of Robert Hungerford, 2nd Baron Hungerford (son of Walter Hungerford, 1st Baron Hungerford (died 1449)) by his wife Margaret, 4th Baroness Botreaux.

== Career ==
Following his marriage to the heiress Eleanor de Moleyns, Hungerford was summoned to Parliament as Baron Moleyns in 1445, and received the same summons every year until 1453.

=== Dispute with John Paston ===
In 1448, Hungerford began a fierce quarrel with John Paston about the ownership of the manor of Gresham, Norfolk. Hungerford, acting on the advice of John Heydon, a solicitor of Baconsthorpe, took forcible possession of the estate on 17 February 1448. William Waynflete, bishop of Winchester, made a vain attempt at arbitration. Paston obtained repossession, but on 28 January 1450 Hungerford sent a thousand men to dislodge him. After threatening to kill Paston, who was absent, Hungerford's men violently assaulted Paston's wife Margaret, but Hungerford finally had to surrender the manor to Paston.

=== French wars ===
In 1452, Hungerford went with John Talbot, 2nd Earl of Shrewsbury, to Aquitaine, and was taken prisoner while trying to raise the siege of Chastillon. His ransom was fixed at 7,966 pounds, and his mother sold her plate and mortgaged her estates to raise the money. His release was effected in 1459, after seven years and four months' imprisonment. In consideration of his misfortunes, in the year of his return to England he was granted a licence to export fifteen hundred sacks of wool to foreign ports without paying duty and received permission to travel abroad. He thereupon visited Florence.

=== Wars of the Roses ===
In 1460, Hungerford was home again and he took a leading part on the Lancastrian side in the Wars of the Roses. In June 1460 he retired with Lord Scales and other of his friends to the Tower of London, on the entry of the Earl of Warwick and his Kentish followers into the city; but after the defeat of the Lancastrians at the battle of Northampton (10 July 1460), Hungerford and his friends surrendered the Tower to the Yorkists, on the condition that he and Scales should go free.

After taking part in the Battle of Towton (29 March 1461) – a further defeat for the Lancastrians — Hungerford fled with Henry VI to York, and from there into Scotland. He visited France in the summer to obtain help for Henry and Margaret, and was arrested by the French king in August 1461. Writing to Margaret at the time from Dieppe, he begged her not to lose heart. He was attainted in Edward IV's first parliament in November 1461. He afterwards met with some success in his efforts to rally the Lancastrians in the north of England, but was taken prisoner at the Battle of Hexham on 15 May 1464, and was executed at Newcastle.

== Marriage and issue ==
In about 1441, still at a very early age, he married Eleanor de Moleyns (1426-1476), daughter and heiress of William de Moleyns (1406-1429), killed at the Siege of Orléans, son and heir of Sir William de Moleyns (d.1424) of Stoke Poges in Buckinghamshire. Eleanor survived her husband and subsequently married Sir Oliver Manningham. She was buried at Stoke Poges in 1476. By his wife he had issue including:

- Sir Thomas Hungerford of Rowden
- Sir Walter Hungerford of Farleigh

== Death and succession ==
He was taken prisoner at the Battle of Hexham on 15 May 1464, taken to Newcastle, where he was executed on 17 May. He was buried in Salisbury Cathedral. On 5 August 1462 many of his lands were granted to Richard, Duke of Gloucester (afterward Richard III). Other portions of his property were given to John Wenlock, 1st Baron Wenlock, who was directed by Edward IV to make provision for Hungerford's wife and young children.
