= Thomas Hungerford of Rowden =

English nobleman

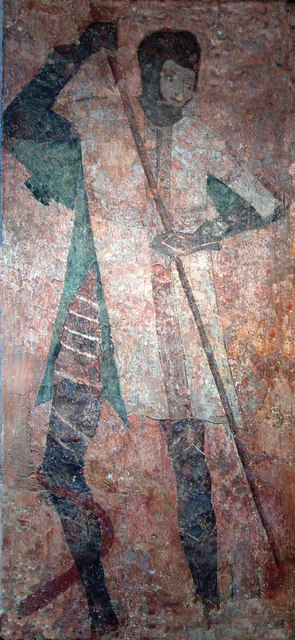
Farleigh Hungerford Castle wall painting in chapel

Sir Thomas Hungerford of Rowden (died 17 January 1469) was an English nobleman. He supported the Lancastrian cause in the War of the Roses and was executed for supporting a conspiracy to restore Henry VI.

== Origins and early life ==
He was the eldest son of Robert Hungerford, 3rd Baron Hungerford and Eleanor de Moleyns. He lived chiefly at Rowden, near Chippenham, Wiltshire.

Thomas was pardoned by Edward IV for participating in the rebellion of his father in November 1462 and was knighted not long afterward. He was allowed to inherit some of his attained father's lands after his execution following the Battle of Hexham on 17 May 1464.

== Execution ==
After giving some support to Edward IV and the Yorkists, Thomas Hungerford was arrested with Henry Courtenay (brother of Thomas Courtenay, 6th/14th Earl of Devon) in Wiltshire before 11 November 1468. They were tried on 12 January 1469 in Salisbury before a court headed by six peers including Richard, Duke of Gloucester and found guilty by a jury of 16. They were charged with having joined in a Lancastrian conspiracy to restore Henry VI and plotted with his wife Margaret of Anjou on 21 May 1468 and other occasions the "final death and final destruction...of the Most Christian Prince, Edward IV."

Both men were executed on 17 January 1469 in the presence of Edward IV and received the "fullest and protracted horrors" of a fifteenth century execution. Thomas Hungerford was buried in the chapel of Farleigh Castle.

== Marriage and issue ==
Before 16 October 1460, still at a very early age, he married Anne Percy, daughter of Henry Percy, 3rd Earl of Northumberland. His wife survived him until 5 July 1522 and was buried in St. Margaret's Church, Westminster. She remarried twice, to Sir Lawrence Raynsford in 1470 and to Sir Hugh Vaughan after 1490.

They had only one child, Mary Hungerford, who became the ward of William Hastings, 1st Baron Hastings, and in 1480 married Edward Hastings, her guardian's son. The attainders on her father and grandfather were reversed in her favour in 1485, and her husband was summoned to Parliament as Lord Hungerford.
