= Robert Hungerford, 2nd Baron Hungerford =

English landowner

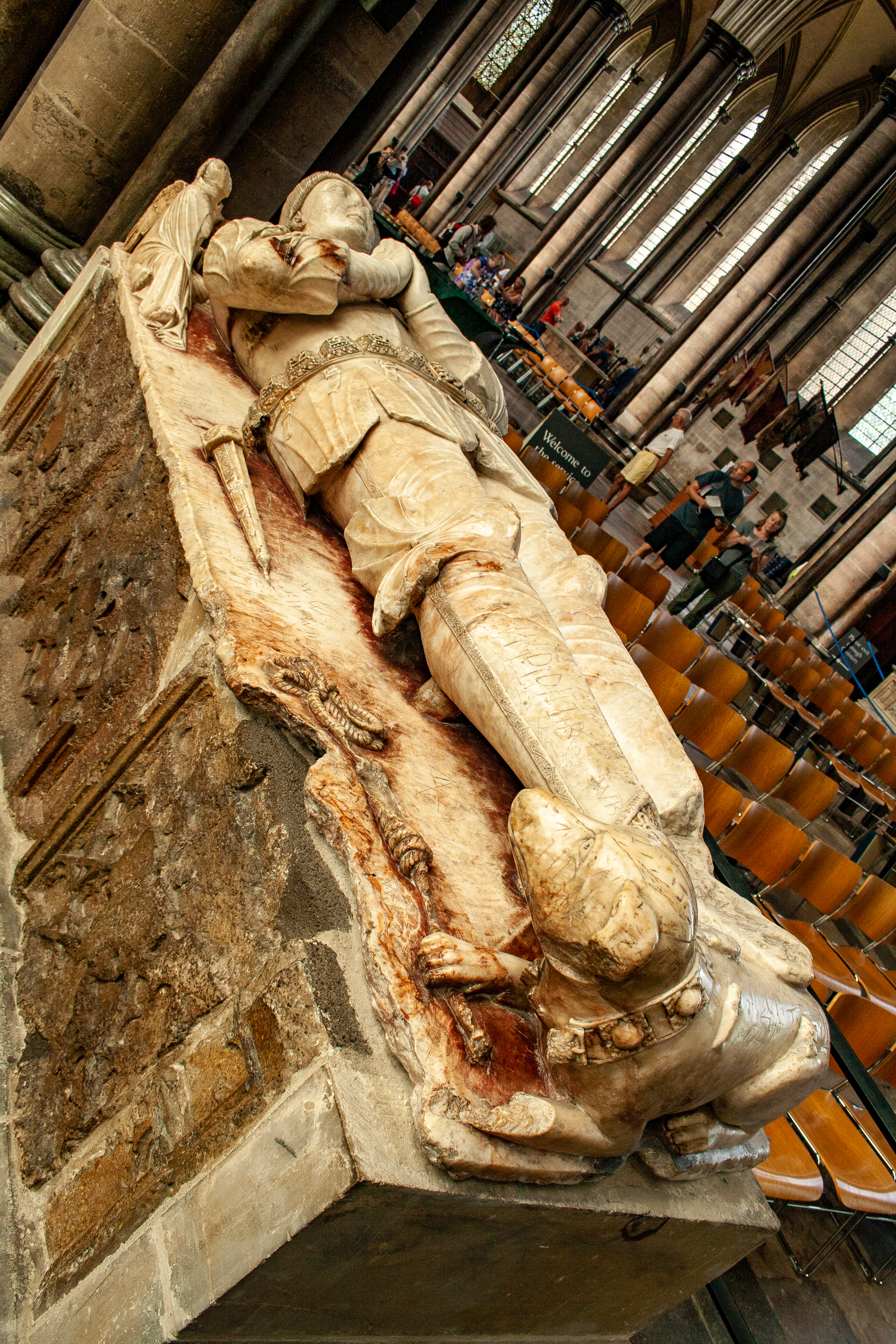
Tombstone of Robert Hungerford in Salisbury Cathedral

Arms of Hungerford: Sable, two bars argent in chief three plates

Robert Hungerford, 2nd Baron Hungerford (1409–1459) was an English landowner. The second but eldest surviving son of Walter Hungerford, 1st Baron Hungerford, he served in the Hundred Years' War, and was summoned to parliament as Baron Hungerford from 5 September 1450 to 26 May 1455. He died 14 May 1459, and in accordance with his will was buried in Salisbury Cathedral. He was succeeded by his son Robert Hungerford, 3rd Baron Hungerford (1431–1464).

His mother (Catherine Peverell) and his wife Margaret, 4th Baroness Botreaux, the wealthy heiress of William de Botreaux, 3rd Baron Botreaux, added to the landed property of his family in Cornwall. His wife lived until 7 February 1478, surviving all her descendants, excepting a great-granddaughter, Mary Hastings, 4th Baroness Hungerford. Her will, dated 8 August 1476, is printed in Nicholas Harris Nicolas's Testamenta Vetusta, and in Hoare's "Modern Wiltshire, Hundred of Heytesbury. A list of the heavy expenses she incurred in ransoming her son Robert appears in William Dugdale's Baronage.
