= Shapcott =

Shapcott is an English surname. Notable people with this surname include the following:

- Jo Shapcott (born 1953), English poet, editor and lecturer
- Michael Shapcott, Canadian social activist and academic
- Morton Shapcott (1901–1977), English cricketer and Royal Air Force officer
- Thomas Shapcott (born 1935), Australian poet, novelist, playwright, editor, librettist, short story writer and teacher

== Other uses ==
- Shapcott Wensley, pseudonym of English author and poet Henry Shapcott Bunce (1854–1917)

== See also ==
- Thomas Shapcott Poetry Prize, literary award for an unpublished poetry manuscript by a Queensland author
