= Battle of Hexham =

1464 battle in the English Wars of the Roses

Coordinates: 54°58′12″N 2°6′0″W

- Part of the Wars of the Roses
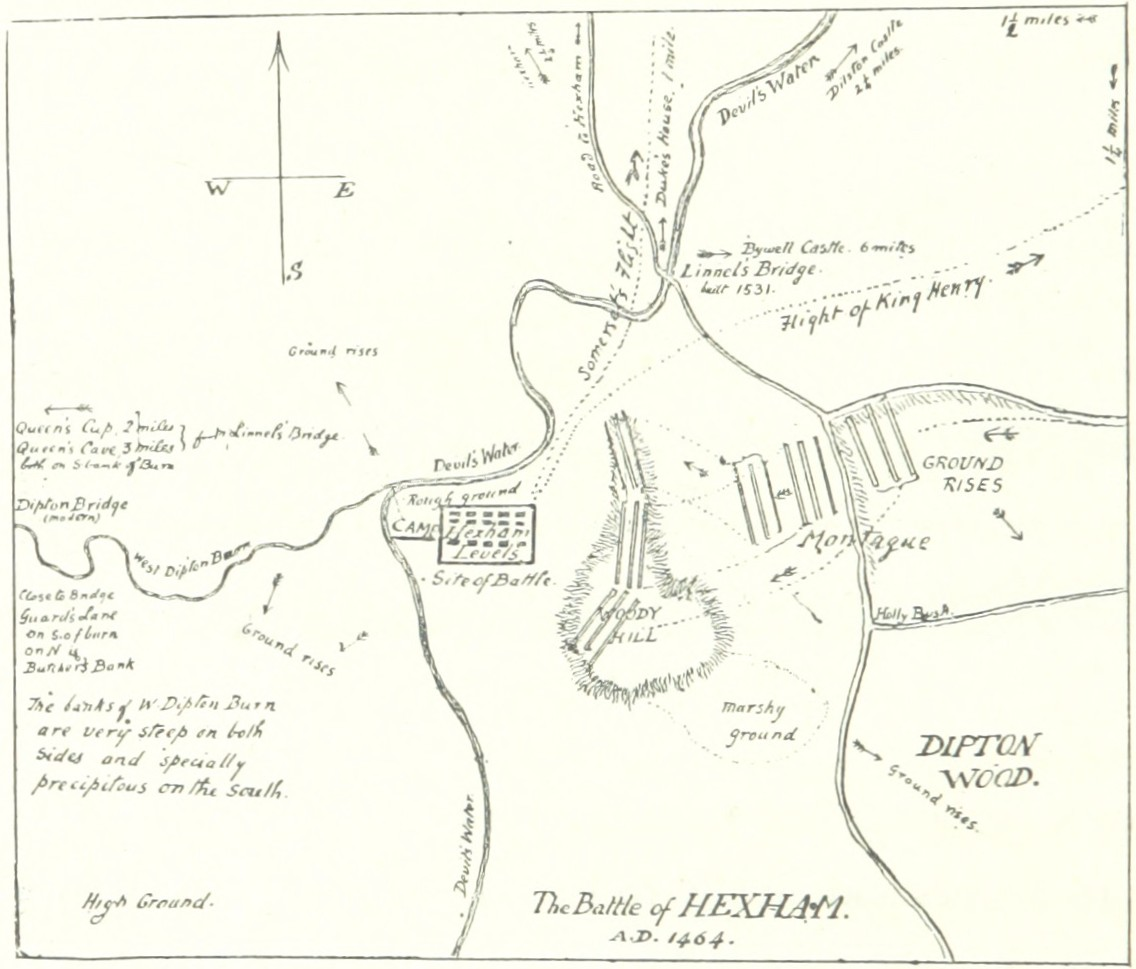
- Map of the battle by Charles Raymond Booth Barrett (1896)
Date	15 May 1464
Location	Hexham in Northumberland, England
Result	Decisive Yorkist victory

Belligerents
House of York	House of Lancaster

Commanders and leaders
Baron Montagu	Duke of Somerset (executed); Baron Ros (executed); Baron Hungerford (executed)

Strength
3,000–4,000	Unknown

Casualties and losses
Unknown (Significantly fewer than Lancastrian forces)	Unknown (Significantly more than Yorkist forces)

The Battle of Hexham, 15 May 1464, marked the end of significant Lancastrian resistance in the north of England during the early part of the reign of Edward IV.

The battle was fought near the town of Hexham in Northumberland. John Neville, later to be 1st Marquess of Montagu, led a modest force of 3,000-4,000 men, and routed the rebel Lancastrians. Most of the rebel leaders were captured and executed, including Henry Beaufort, Duke of Somerset, and Lord Hungerford. Henry VI, however, was kept safely away (having been captured in battle three times earlier), and escaped to the north.

With their leadership gone, only a few castles remained in rebel hands. After these fell later in the year, Edward IV was not seriously challenged until the Earl of Warwick changed his allegiance from the Yorkist to the Lancastrian cause in 1469.

== Before ==
After the Battle of Towton, the Lancastrians failed to prevent the Yorkists from concluding peace negotiations with Scotland in 1463, and soon found that their northern base of operations was now threatened. It was decided to mount a campaign in the north of England to gather Lancastrian support before a huge force under Edward IV could muster in Leicester and move north to crush the rebellion.

The Lancastrian army moved through Northumberland in late April 1464 under the Duke of Somerset, and gathered support from Lancastrian garrisons. After the Lancastrians lost the Battle of Hedgeley Moor on 25 April 1464 to a Yorkist force led by John Neville, Lord Montagu, the Lancastrians again met Neville, this time near Hexham. The two sides met outside Hexham on 14 May 1464.

== Battle ==
Details of the site of the battle, the composition and number of combatants and the events are sketchy but it is thought that the battle was relatively bloodless.

The Lancastrian camp was near Linnels Bridge over the Devil's Water found slightly to the south of Hexham. The Yorkists crossed onto the south bank of the Tyne on the night of 12–13 May and were, by the morning of the 14th, in a position to attack Hexham. Presumably the Yorkist advance was at speed, as despite warnings by their own scouts the Lancastrians had little time to prepare for battle.

It is thought that Somerset rushed his forces to a site near Linnels Bridge and deployed his troops in three detachments in a meadow near the Devil's Water, there he hoped he could engage the Yorkist army before it moved past him into Hexham. No sooner had the Lancastrians taken their positions than the Yorkists charged down from their positions on higher ground. Upon seeing the Yorkist advance the right detachment of the Lancastrian army, commanded by Lord Roos, turned and fled across the Devil's Water and into Hexham, before a single blow had been struck. The remnants of Somerset's force were in a hopeless situation, hemmed in and unable to manoeuvre; the Yorkist troops charged through the one opening at the east end of Linnel's Meadow and engaged the bewildered Lancastrian soldiers.

Lancastrian morale collapsed, and after some token resistance the remains of Somerset's army was pushed into the Devil's Water by the Yorkist infantry. A chaotic rout followed, men either drowned in the river or were crushed as they tried to climb the steep banks of the Devil's Water in the retreat towards Hexham. Most, however, were trapped in West Dipton Wood on the north bank of the river and were forced to surrender when the Yorkists approached.

== Aftermath ==
Neville showed little of Edward's conciliatory spirit, and had thirty leading Lancastrians executed in Hexham on the evening following the battle, including Henry Beaufort, 3rd Duke of Somerset, and Lord Roos. William Tailboys was captured and executed shortly after he tried to flee north with £2,000 of Henry's war chest. Upon the loss of its leadership and bankroll, the Lancastrian resistance in the North of England collapsed.

Following his defeat in the Battle of Hexham on 15 May 1464, Henry VI found refuge, sheltered by Lancastrian supporters, at houses across the north of England. Following stays at Muncaster Castle on the Cumbrian coast and at nearby Bolton Hall, he was in hiding at Waddington Hall, in Waddington, Lancashire, the home of Richard Tempest. Here, he was betrayed by "a black monk of Addington" and on 13 July 1465, a group of Yorkist men, including Richard's brother John, entered the home to arrest him. Henry VI fled into nearby woods but was soon captured. This meant that the rebellion was effectively over. There followed a relative period of peace until the Earl of Warwick's defection to the Lancastrian cause in 1469 and the wars started anew.
