= Wars of the Roses =

Series of civil wars in England (1455–1487)

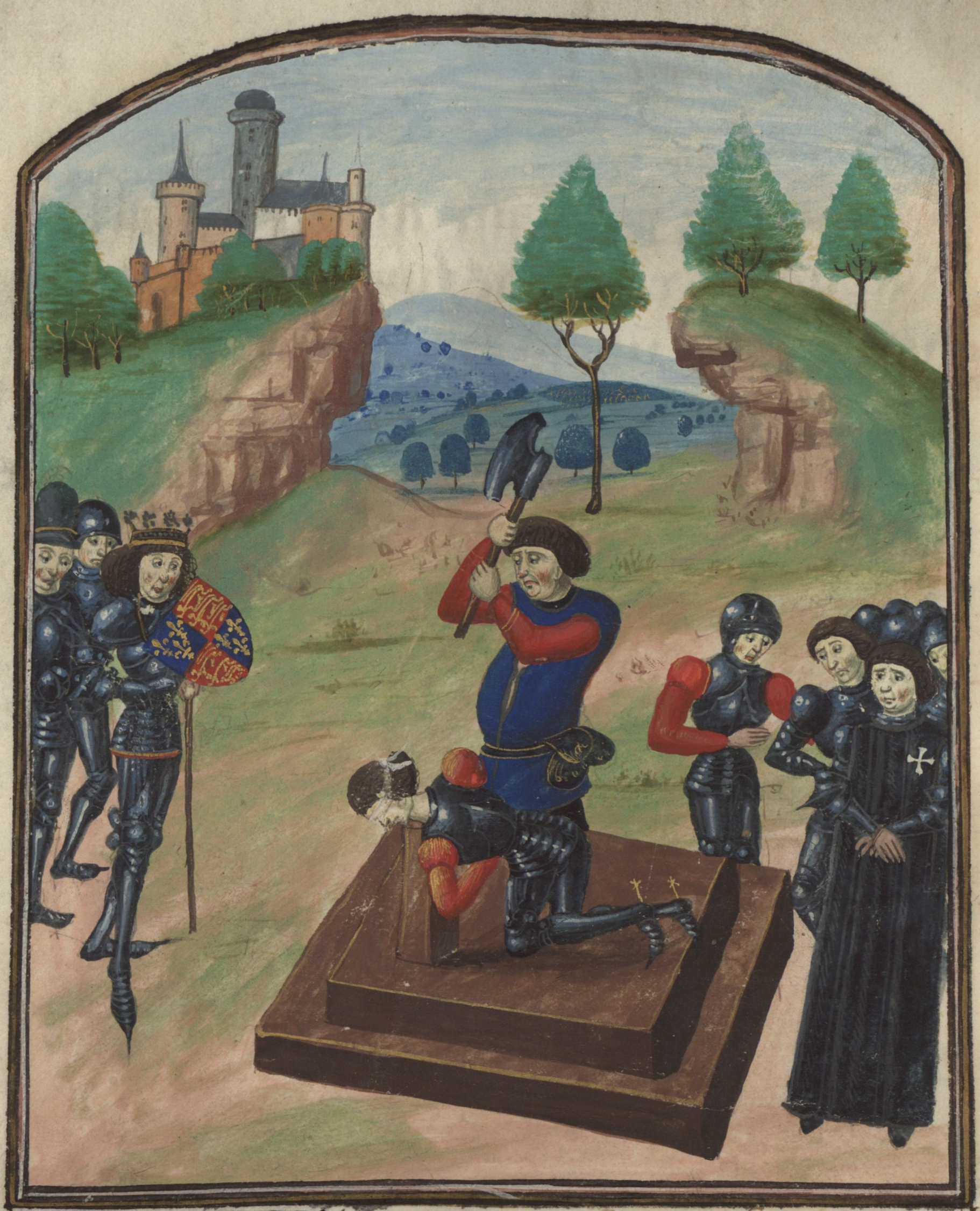
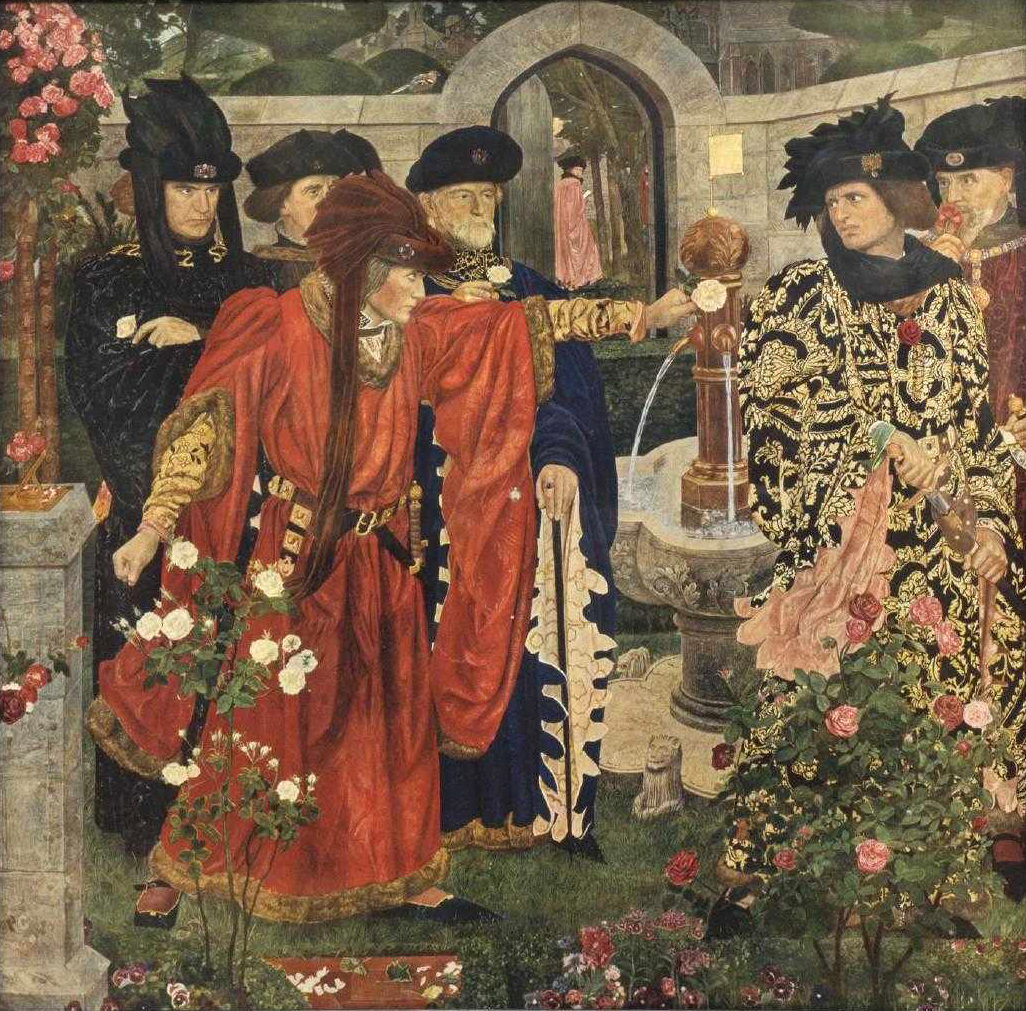
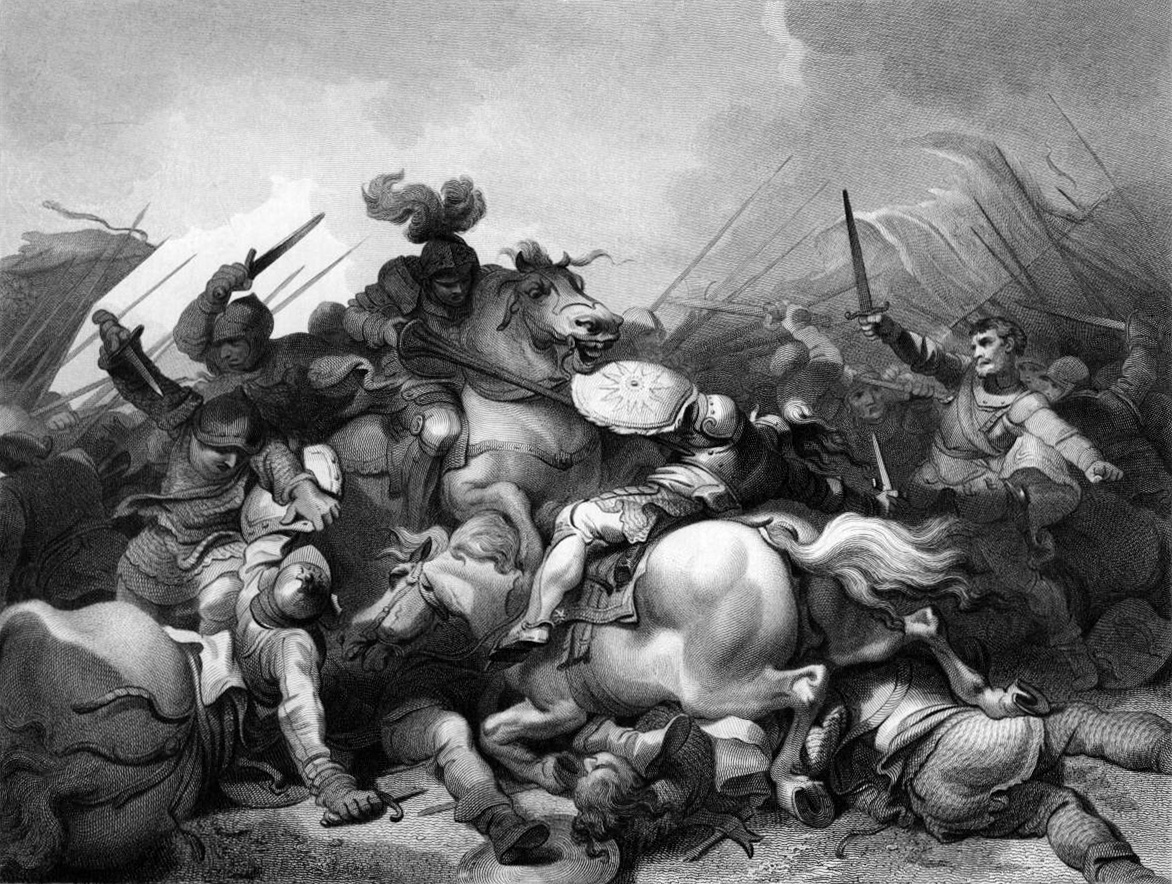
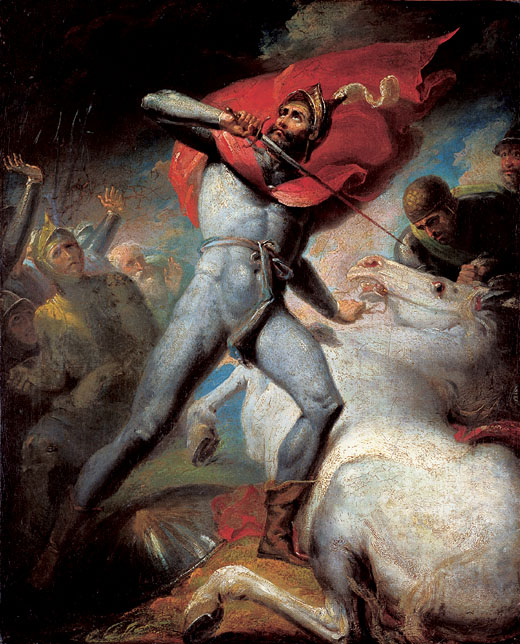
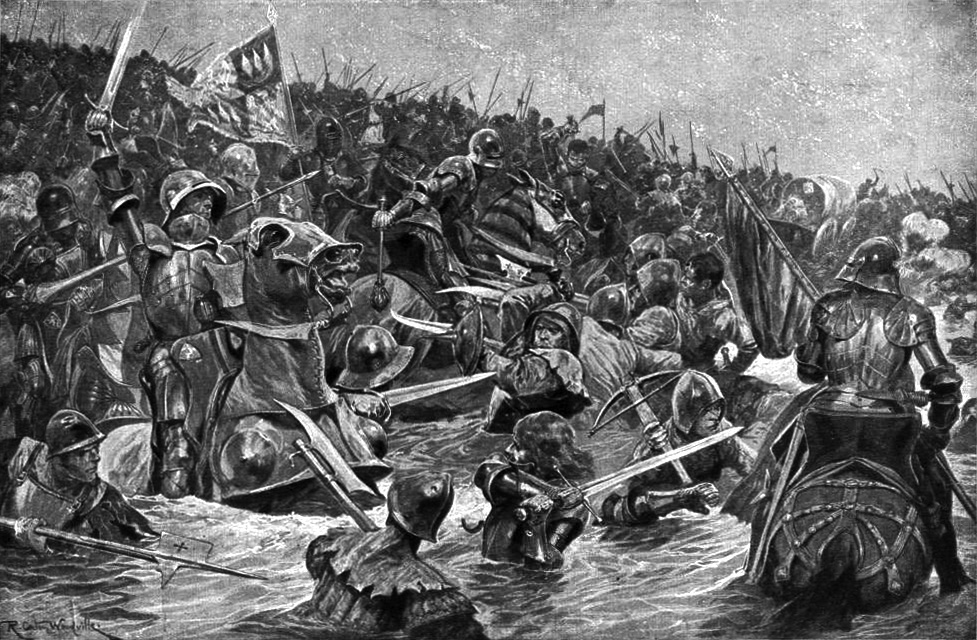
- Clockwise from top: the execution of the Duke of Somerset before King Edward IV; the Battle of Bosworth Field; the Battle of Towton; the vow of Richard Neville at Towton; and the scene in the Temple Garden from Shakespeare's play Henry VI, Part 1, in which supporters of the rival factions pick either red or white roses.
Date	22 May 1455 – 16 June 1487 (32 years, 3 weeks and 4 days)
Location	England, Wales, Ireland and Calais
Result	Victory for the House of Tudor; See § Aftermath

Belligerents
House of Lancaster; House of Tudor; Kingdom of France (1460–1485); Kingdom of Scotland (1460–1485); Duchy of Brittany (Note: Francis II sheltered Henry Tudor, supplying him with money, troops, and ships. It was only after Francis fell ill that Henry was forced to flee Brittany to France.)	House of York; Burgundian State; Duchy of Brittany (Note: After Francis II became ill, his treasurer, Pierre Landais, ruling the Duchy in his stead, aided Richard III in attempting to capture Henry Tudor.)

Commanders and leaders
Henry VI (surrendered); Margaret of Anjou (surrendered); Henry VII	Duke of York †; Edward IV #; Edward V; Richard III †

Casualties and losses
- 105,000 killed in combat

The Wars of the Roses, known at the time and in the following centuries as the Civil Wars, were a series of armed confrontations, machinations, battles and campaigns fought for control of the English throne from 1455 to 1487. The conflict was fought between supporters of the House of York (whose emblem was a white rose) and the House of Lancaster (whose emblem, by 1485, was a red rose), two rival cadet branches of the royal House of Plantagenet. The conflict resulted in the end of Lancaster's male line in 1471, leaving the Tudor family to inherit, through the female line, the Lancaster claim to the throne. The conflict was largely brought to an end upon the union of the two houses through marriage, creating the Tudor dynasty that would subsequently rule England.

The Wars of the Roses were rooted in English socio-economic troubles caused by the Hundred Years' War (1337–1453) with France, as well as the quasi-military bastard feudalism resulting from the powerful duchies created by King Edward III (died 1377). The mental instability of the House of Lancaster's King Henry VI (first reign: 1422 to 1461) revived his cousin Richard of York, 3rd Duke of York's interest in a claim to the throne. Warfare began in 1455 with York's capture of Henry at the First Battle of St Albans, upon which York was appointed Lord Protector by Parliament. Fighting resumed four years later when Yorkists led by Richard Neville, Earl of Warwick, captured Henry again, at the Battle of Northampton. After attempting to seize the throne, York was killed at the Battle of Wakefield, and his son Edward inherited his claim per the controversial Act of Accord. The Yorkists lost custody of Henry in 1461 after the Second Battle of St Albans, but defeated the Lancastrians at the Battle of Towton. The Yorkist Edward IV was formally crowned in June 1461.

In 1464, Edward married Elizabeth Woodville against Warwick's advice, and reversed Warwick's policy of seeking closer ties with France. Warwick rebelled against Edward in 1469, leading to Edward's imprisonment after Warwick's supporters defeated a Yorkist army at the Battle of Edgcote. Edward was allowed to resume his rule after Warwick failed to replace him with Edward's brother George of Clarence. Within a year, Warwick launched an invasion of England alongside Henry VI's wife, Margaret of Anjou. Edward fled to Flanders, and Henry VI was restored as king in 1470. Edward mounted a counter-invasion with aid from Burgundy a few months later and killed Warwick at the Battle of Barnet. Henry was imprisoned again, and his sole heir was later killed by Edward at the Battle of Tewkesbury, followed by Henry's own death in the Tower of London, possibly on Edward's orders. Edward ruled unopposed for the next twelve years, during which England enjoyed a period of relative peace. Upon his death in 1483, he was succeeded by his twelve-year-old son, Edward V, who reigned for 78 days, before being deposed by his uncle Richard.

Richard III assumed the throne amid controversies regarding the disappearance of Edward IV's two sons. He was met with a short-lived but major revolt and a wave of Yorkist defections. Amid the chaos, Henry Tudor, a descendant of Edward III through Lady Margaret Beaufort and a veteran Lancastrian, returned from exile with an army and defeated and killed Richard at the Battle of Bosworth Field in 1485. Tudor then assumed the English throne as Henry VII and united the rival houses by marrying Elizabeth of York, Edward IV's eldest daughter and heir. The wars concluded in 1487, with Henry VII's defeat of the remaining Yorkist opposition at Stoke Field. The House of Tudor would rule England until 1603, a period that saw the strengthening of the monarchy and the end of the medieval period in England.

== Nomenclature and symbolism ==
The White Rose of the House of York

The Red Rose of the House of Lancaster

The unified Tudor Rose of the House of Tudor

The name "Wars of the Roses" refers to the heraldic badges associated with the two rival branches of the royal House of Plantagenet fighting for control of the English throne; the White Rose of York and the Red Rose of Lancaster. Embryonic forms of this term were used in 1727 by Bevil Higgons, who described the quarrel between the two roses and by David Hume in The History of England (1754–1761):

The people, divided in their affections, took different symbols of party: the partisans of the house of Lancaster chose the red rose as their mark of distinction; those of York were denominated from the white; and these civil wars were thus known over Europe by the name of the quarrel between the two roses.

The modern term Wars of the Roses came into common use in the early 19th century following the publication of the 1829 novel Anne of Geierstein by Sir Walter Scott. Scott based the name on a scene in William Shakespeare's play Henry VI, Part 1 (Act 2, Scene 4), set in the gardens of the Temple Church, where a number of noblemen and a lawyer pick red or white roses to symbolically display their loyalty to the Lancastrian or Yorkist faction respectively. During Shakespeare's time, the conflict was simply referred to as the "civil wars"; (Note: During Shakespeare's the term Civil Wars was in common use, cf. e.g., the title of Samuel Daniel's work, the First Four Books of the Civil Wars.) however, the occurrence of the English Civil War in the 17th century occasioned a need for a different name for the earlier dynastic conflict.

The Yorkist faction used the symbol of the white rose from early in the conflict, but the red rose of Lancaster was introduced only after the victory of Henry Tudor at the Battle of Bosworth Field in 1485. After Henry's victory and marriage to Elizabeth of York, the heir of Edward IV, the two roses were combined to form the Tudor rose, to symbolise the union of the two claims. The use of the rose itself as a cognizance stemmed from Edward I's use of "a golden rose stalked proper". Often, owing to nobles holding multiple titles, more than one badge was used: Edward IV, for example, used both his sun in splendour as Earl of March, but also his father's falcon and fetterlock as Duke of York. Badges were not always distinct; at the Battle of Barnet, Edward's 'sun' was very similar to the Earl of Oxford's Vere star, which caused fatal confusion in the fighting.

Many participants wore livery badges associated with their immediate liege lords or patrons. The wearing of livery was confined to those in "continuous employ of a lord", thus excluding, for example, mercenary companies. For example, Henry Tudor's forces at Bosworth fought under the banner of a red dragon, while the Yorkist army used Richard III's personal device of a white boar.

While the names of the rival houses derive from the cities of York and Lancaster, the corresponding duchy and dukedom had little to do with these cities. The lands and offices attached to the Duchy of Lancaster were primarily located in Gloucestershire, North Wales, Cheshire, and, ironically, in Yorkshire, while the estates of the Duke of York were spread throughout England and Wales, with many in the Welsh Marches.

== Causes ==
Historians disagree over which factors were the main causes of the wars.

=== Bastard feudalism ===
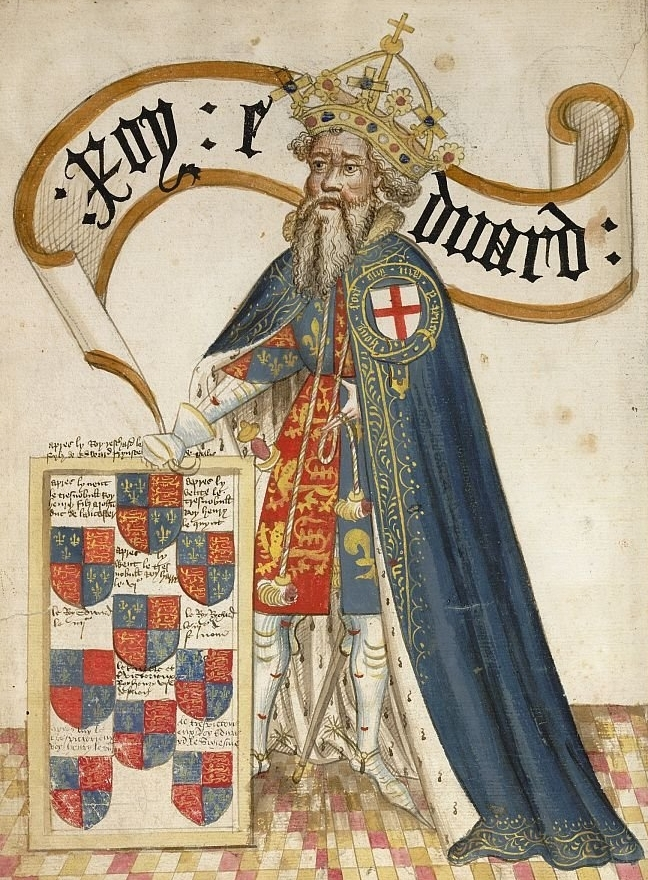
Edward III was the father of five dukes: Edward (Cornwall), Lionel (Clarence), John (Lancaster), Edmund (York), and Thomas (Gloucester).

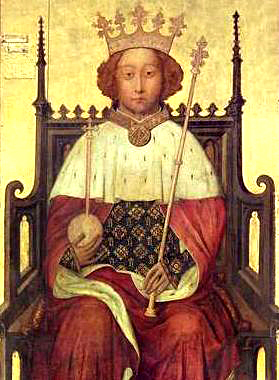
Richard II was a child-king who succeeded his grandfather Edward III shortly after the death of his father, Edward the Black Prince.

Edward III, who ruled England from 1327 to 1377, had five sons who survived into adulthood; Edward of Woodstock "the Black Prince", Lionel of Antwerp, John of Gaunt, Edmund of Langley, and Thomas of Woodstock. Throughout his reign, he created duchies for his sons; Cornwall in 1337 for Edward, and in 1362 Clarence for Lionel and Lancaster for John. In 1385, during the reign of Richard II, Edmund became Duke of York and Thomas became the Duke of Gloucester.

Dukedoms had hitherto never been conferred by any English monarch upon a subject until the creation of the Duchy of Cornwall in 1337. Their genesis spawned a powerful new class of English nobility with claims to the throne and, theoretically, enough power to vie for it, since the new duchies provided Edward's sons and their heirs presumptive with an income independent of the sovereign or the state, thereby allowing them to establish and maintain their own private military retinues.

Over time, these duchies began to exacerbate the structural defects inherent in so-called "bastard feudalism", a somewhat controversial term coined in 1885 by historian Charles Plummer but largely defined by Plummer's contemporary, William Stubbs. During the reign of Edward's grandfather, Edward I, Stubbs describes a substantive shift in social dynamics in which the conscription-based feudal levy came to be replaced by a system of royal payment in return for military service by the magnates who served the monarch. Thus, instead of vassals rendering military service when called, they paid a portion of their income into their lord's treasury, who would supplement the owed service with hired retainers. These retinues were known as affinities—essentially a collection of all the individuals whom a lord had gathered for service—and came to be one of the most fundamentally defining aspects of bastard feudalism. These affinities also had the means of tying the more powerful magnates to the lower nobility, although these relationships were now largely defined by personal connections that exhibited reciprocal benefit, rather than tenurial or feudal relationships that preceded bastard feudalism. Consequently, lords could now raise retinues they could implicitly trust, since the men of the affinity owed their positions to their patron. These affinities were often much larger than the number of men the lord actually knew, since the members of the affinity also knew and supported each other.

Under the reign of Richard II, this created a power struggle with the magnates, as Richard sought to increase the size of his own affinities as a counterweight to the growing retinues of his nobles. The retinues of the magnates became powerful enough to defend the interests of their lord against even the authority of the monarch, as John of Gaunt, and later his son, Henry Bolingbroke, did against Richard. During the wars, disaffected magnates such as Richard of York and Warwick the Kingmaker were able to rely upon their complex network of servants and retainers to successfully defy the authority of Henry VI.

=== Claims of the two Houses ===
==== Lancastrian claim ====
The House of Lancaster descended from John of Gaunt, the third surviving son of Edward III. The name derives from Gaunt's primary title as Duke of Lancaster, which he was granted after his marriage to Blanche of Lancaster. The Lancastrian claim to the throne had received preference from Edward III which explicitly emphasised the male line of descent. Henry IV based his right to depose Richard II and subsequent assumption of the throne upon this claim, since it could be argued that the heir presumptive was in fact Edmund Mortimer, the great-grandson of Edward III's second surviving son, Lionel, Duke of Clarence. However, Mortimer was descended through the female line, inheriting the claim from his grandmother, Philippa. An important branch of the House of Lancaster was the House of Beaufort, whose members were descended from Gaunt by his mistress, Katherine Swynford. Originally illegitimate, they were legitimised by a papal bull when Gaunt and Katherine later married. However, Henry IV excluded them from the line of succession to the throne.

==== Yorkist claim ====
The House of York descended from Edmund of Langley, the fourth surviving son of Edward III and younger brother of John of Gaunt. The name derives from Langley's primary title as Duke of York, which he acquired in 1385 during the reign of his nephew, Richard II. The Yorkist claim on the throne, unlike the Lancastrian claim, was based upon the female line of descent, as descendants of Lionel, the Duke of Clarence. Langley's second son, Richard of Conisburgh, had married Anne de Mortimer, daughter of Roger Mortimer and sister of Edmund Mortimer. Anne's grandmother, Philippa of Clarence, was the daughter of Lionel of Antwerp. During the fourteenth century, the Mortimers were the most powerful marcher family in the kingdom. G.M. Trevelyan wrote that "the Wars of the Roses were to a large extent a quarrel between Welsh Marcher Lords, who were also great English nobles, closely related to the English throne."

== Initial phase of conflict (1377–1399) ==
=== Succession crisis ===
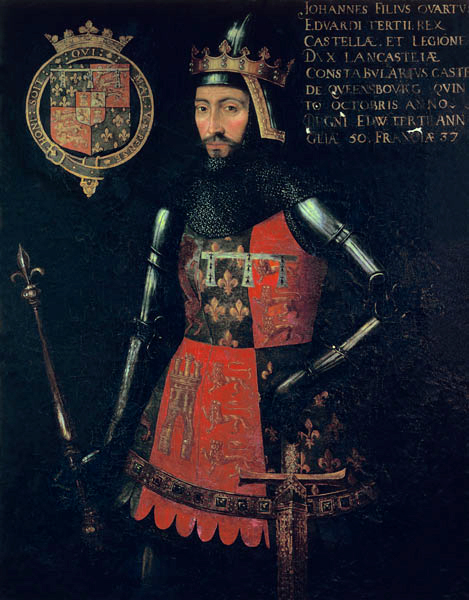
John of Gaunt, founder of the House of Lancaster

The question of succession following the death of Edward III in 1377 is said by historian Ian Mortimer to be the root cause of the Wars of the Roses. Although Edward's succession seemed secure, there was a "sudden narrowing in the direct line of descent" near the end of his reign; Edward's two eldest sons, the heir apparent Edward, Duke of Cornwall ("the Black Prince"), and Lionel, Duke of Clarence, had predeceased their father in 1376 and 1368 respectively. Edward III was survived by three sons with claims to the throne: John of Gaunt, Duke of Lancaster; Edmund of Langley, 1st Duke of York; and Thomas of Woodstock, 1st Duke of Gloucester.

The Black Prince had one surviving son, Richard, who had a claim to the throne based upon the principle that the son of the heir apparent had priority in the line of succession over his uncles. However, Richard was a minor, and his uncles were politically powerful and ambitious, so there was considerable uncertainty within the realm over who should inherit the throne. Ultimately, Edward III was succeeded by his grandson who was crowned Richard II at just 10 years old.

Under the laws of primogeniture, if Richard died without a legitimate heir, his successors would be the descendants of Lionel of Antwerp, Edward III's second eldest son. Lionel's only child Philippa married into the Mortimer family and had a son, Roger Mortimer, who technically would have the best legal claim of succession. However, a legal decree issued by Edward III in 1376 introduced complexity into the question of succession, since the letters patent he issued limited the right of succession to his male line, which placed his third son, John of Gaunt, ahead of Lionel's descendants, since the latter were descended through the female line.

=== Reign of Richard II ===
Richard II, also known as Richard of Bordeaux, was King of England from 1377 until he was deposed in 1399. During Richard's first years as king, government was in the hands of a series of regency councils, influenced by Richard's uncles John of Gaunt and Thomas of Woodstock. England then faced various problems, most notably the Hundred Years' War. A major challenge of the reign was the Peasants' Revolt in 1381, and the young king played a central part in the successful suppression of this crisis. Less warlike than either his father or grandfather, he sought to bring an end to the Hundred Years' War. A firm believer in the royal prerogative, Richard restrained the power of the aristocracy and relied on a private retinue for military protection instead.

Richard's reign was tumultuous, marked by increasing dissension between the monarch and several of the most powerful nobles. Richard ruled without a regency council despite his young age in order to exclude his uncle, John of Gaunt the Duke of Lancaster, from wielding legitimate power. Unpopular taxes which funded unsuccessful military expeditions in Europe triggered the Peasant's Revolt in 1381, and Parliament's refusal to cooperate with the king's unpopular Lord Chancellor, Michael de la Pole, created a political crisis that seriously threatened to dethrone Richard. Richard had repeatedly switched his choice of heir throughout his reign to keep his political enemies at bay.

The king's dependence on a small number of courtiers caused discontent among the influential, and in 1387 control of government was taken over by a group of aristocrats known as the Lords Appellant. By 1389 Richard had regained control, and for the next eight years governed in relative harmony with his former opponents.

In France, much of the territory conquered by Edward III had been lost, leading to the Truce of Leulinghem with Charles VI in July 1389. The peace proposal, which would effectively have made England a client kingdom of France, was derided and rejected by Parliament, which was predominately controlled by the knights fighting the war. Richard decided to negotiate a de facto peace directly with Charles without seeking Parliament's approval and agreed to marry Charles's six-year-old daughter, Isabella of Valois. Richard used the interim peace to punish his political rivals. In 1397, he took his revenge on the Appellants, many of whom were executed or exiled. The next two years have been described by historians as Richard's "tyranny".

==== Deposition by Henry Bolingbroke (1399) ====
When John of Gaunt died in 1399, Richard confiscated the lands and titles of Gaunt's son Henry Bolingbroke, whom he had exiled to France in 1398. In May 1399, Richard left England for a military expedition in Ireland, giving Bolingbroke the opportunity to return to England. Henry invaded England in June 1399 with a small force that quickly grew in numbers, meeting little resistance. With the support of much of the disaffected nobility, Bolingbroke deposed Richard and was crowned as Henry IV, the first Lancastrian monarch. Richard is thought to have been starved to death in captivity, although questions remain regarding his final fate.

Richard's posthumous reputation has been shaped to a large extent by William Shakespeare, whose play Richard II portrayed Richard's misrule and his deposition as responsible for the Wars of the Roses. Modern historians do not accept this interpretation, while not exonerating Richard from responsibility for his own deposition. While probably not insane, as many historians of the 19th and 20th centuries believed, he may have had a personality disorder, particularly manifesting itself towards the end of his reign. Most authorities agree that Richard's policies were not unrealistic or even entirely unprecedented, but that the way in which he carried them out was unacceptable to the political establishment, leading to his downfall.

== Lancastrian dynasty (1399–1455) ==
=== Henry IV and Henry V (1399–1422) ===
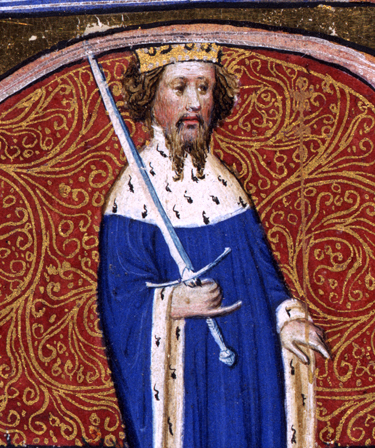
Henry IV of England

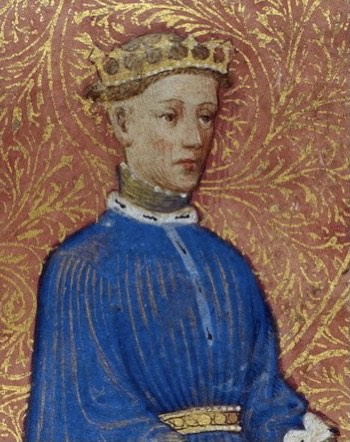
Henry V of England

Almost immediately after assuming the throne, Henry IV faced an attempted deposition known as the "Epiphany Rising" in 1400 by John Montagu, 3rd Earl of Salisbury; John Holland, 1st Duke of Exeter; Thomas Holland, 1st Duke of Surrey; and Thomas Despenser, 1st Earl of Gloucester, to reinstall the imprisoned Richard as king. The attempt failed, all four conspirators were executed, and Richard died shortly thereafter "by means unknown" in Pontefract Castle. Further west in Wales, the Welsh had generally supported Richard's rule, and, welded to a myriad of other socio-economic problems, the accession of Henry triggered a major rebellion in Wales led by Owain Glyndŵr, a member of the Welsh nobility. Glyndŵr's rebellion outlasted Henry's reign and did not end until 1415. During the revolt, Glyndŵr received aid from members of the Tudors, a prominent Anglesey family and maternal cousins of Glyndŵr himself, who would come to play a defining role in the coming Wars of the Roses. Disputes over promises of land, money, and royal favour in exchange for their continued support drove the House of Percy, led by Henry Percy, 1st Earl of Northumberland, and Thomas Percy, 1st Earl of Worcester, to rebel multiple times against Henry. The first challenge was defeated at Shrewsbury in 1403 and Worcester was executed, while a second attempt failed at Bramham Moor in 1408, at which Northumberland was killed. Henry himself died in 1413 and was succeeded by his son, Henry of Monmouth, who was crowned Henry V.

To cement his position as king both domestically and abroad, Henry revived old dynastic claims to the French throne, and, using commercial disputes and the support France loaned to Owain Glyndŵr as a casus belli, invaded France in 1415. While not plagued by constant rebellions as his father's reign was, Henry V faced a major challenge to his authority on the eve of his expedition to France in the form of the Southampton Plot. This was led by Sir Thomas Grey, Henry, Baron Scrope, and Richard of Conisburgh, the latter of whom was the second son of Edmund of Langley the 1st Duke of York. They intended to replace Henry with the young Edmund Mortimer, Richard of Conisburgh's brother-in-law, who was a great-great-grandson of Edward III and at one time the heir presumptive to Richard II. Mortimer remained loyal and informed Henry of the plot, who had all three ringleaders executed.

Henry captured Harfleur on 22 September and inflicted a decisive defeat on the French at Agincourt on 25 October which wiped out a significant part of the French nobility. Agincourt and Henry's subsequent campaigns firmly entrenched the legitimacy of the Lancastrian monarchy and Henry's pursuit of his claims on the French throne. In 1420, Henry and Charles VI of France signed the Treaty of Troyes. The treaty disinherited the French Dauphin Charles from the line of succession, married Charles' daughter Catherine of Valois to Henry, and acknowledged their future sons as legitimate successors to the French throne.

Richard of York, the son of Richard of Conisburgh, was four years old when his father was executed. As his paternal uncle, Edward, 2nd Duke of York, had died at Agincourt without issue, Henry permitted Richard of York to inherit the title and lands of the Duchy of York. When Edmund Mortimer died childless in 1425, Richard of York also inherited the Earldom of March and Mortimer's claim to the throne through his late mother, Edmund Mortimer's sister.

Henry, who himself had three younger brothers and had recently married Catherine, did not doubt that the Lancastrian claim on the crown was secure. On 6 December 1421, Catherine gave birth to a son, Henry. The following year, Henry V died of dysentery, and his son ascended to the throne at just nine months old. Henry V's younger brothers produced no surviving legitimate heirs, leaving only the Beaufort family as alternative Lancastrian successors. As Richard of York grew into maturity and Henry VI's rule deteriorated, York's claim to the throne became more attractive. The revenue from his estates also made him the wealthiest magnate in the kingdom.

=== Henry VI ===
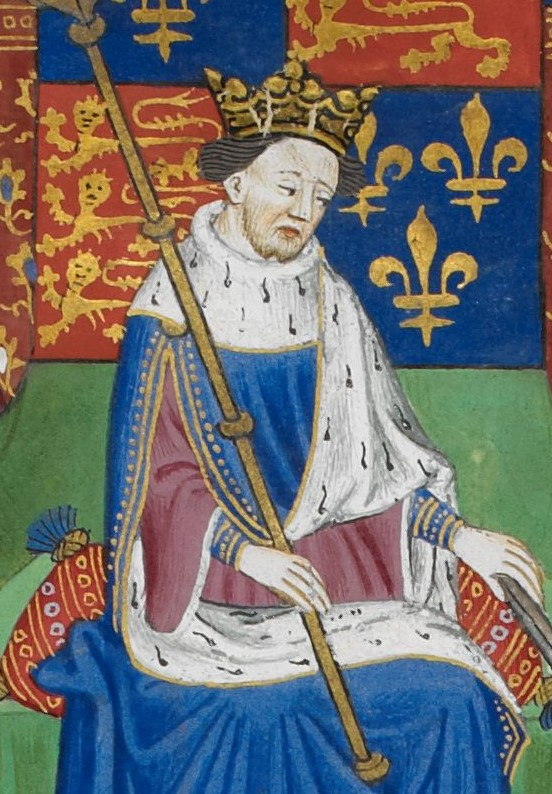
Henry VI of England

From early childhood, Henry VI was surrounded by quarrelsome councillors and advisors. His younger surviving paternal uncle, Humphrey, Duke of Gloucester, sought to be named Lord Protector until Henry came of age, and deliberately courted the popularity of the common people for his own ends, but was opposed by his half-uncle, Cardinal Henry Beaufort. On several occasions, Beaufort called on John, Duke of Bedford, Gloucester's older brother and nominal regent to Henry, to return from his post as the king's commander in France, either to mediate or defend him against Gloucester's accusations of treason. Overseas, the French had rallied around Joan of Arc and had inflicted major defeats on the English at Orléans and Patay, reversing many of the gains made by Henry V and leading to the coronation of the Dauphin as Charles VII in Reims on 17 July 1429. Shortly thereafter, on 6 November, Henry was formally crowned as Henry VI at the age of 7, in response to the coronation of Charles. Around this time, Henry's mother Catherine of Valois had remarried to Owen Tudor and bore two surviving sons, Edmund Tudor and Jasper Tudor, both of whom would play key roles in the concluding stages of the coming wars.

Henry came of age in 1437 at age sixteen. However, Bedford had died two years earlier in 1435, and Beaufort largely withdrew himself from public affairs sometime thereafter, in part because of the rise to prominence of his ally William de la Pole, Earl of Suffolk, as the dominant personality in the royal court. Like Beaufort, Suffolk favoured a diplomatic rather than a military solution to the deteriorating situation in France, a position which resonated with Henry, who was by nature averse to violence and bloodshed. Suffolk was opposed by Gloucester and the rising Richard of York, both of whom favoured continued prosecution of a military solution against France. Suffolk and the Beaufort family frequently received large grants of money, land, and important government and military positions from the king, who preferred their less hawkish inclinations, redirecting much-needed resources away from Richard and Gloucester's campaigns in France, leading to Richard developing a bitter resentment against the Beauforts.

Suffolk continued to increase his influence at court as the principal architect of the Treaty of Tours in 1444 brokering peace between England and France. Suffolk successfully negotiated the marriage to Henry of Margaret of Anjou, only a distant relation of Charles VII through marriage rather than blood, in exchange for the strategically important lands of Maine and Anjou. Though Suffolk earned a promotion from Earl to Marquess (and would be made a Duke in 1448) for his efforts, the clauses of the treaty that required cession of lands to France were kept secret from the English public due to fears of a significant backlash, but Henry insisted on the treaty. Two years later in 1447, Suffolk succeeded in having Gloucester arrested for treason. Gloucester died while awaiting trial, with some at the time suspecting that Suffolk had had him poisoned. Richard of York was stripped of his prestigious command in France and sent to govern the relatively distant Lordship of Ireland with a ten-year term of office, where he could not interfere with affairs at court.

During this time, England continued to suffer reversals in France. Suffolk, who was now the principal power behind the throne, could not avoid taking the blame for these losses. Additionally, the blame of the unfavourable request to cede Maine and Anjou to the French was laid at Suffolk's feet, though he continued to insist he had made no promises during negotiations to such a demand. In 1450, Suffolk was arrested, imprisoned in the Tower of London, and impeached in the Commons. Henry intervened and instead exiled Suffolk for five years, but en route to Calais, Suffolk was captured and executed on 2 May 1450. Suffolk was succeeded by Edmund Beaufort, Duke of Somerset, nephew of Henry Beaufort, as the leader of the faction pursuing peace with France, having been appointed as Richard's replacement as commander in France in 1448. Somerset's political position was somewhat fragile, as English military failures in 1449 following a resumption of hostilities left him vulnerable to criticism from Richard's allies at court. Somerset had by this time become a close ally of Henry's wife, Margaret of Anjou. Margaret herself wielded almost complete control over the pliable King Henry, and her close friendship with Somerset led many to suspect the two were having an affair; indeed, upon the birth of Henry and Margaret's son, Edward of Westminster in 1453, there were widespread rumours that Somerset was the father.

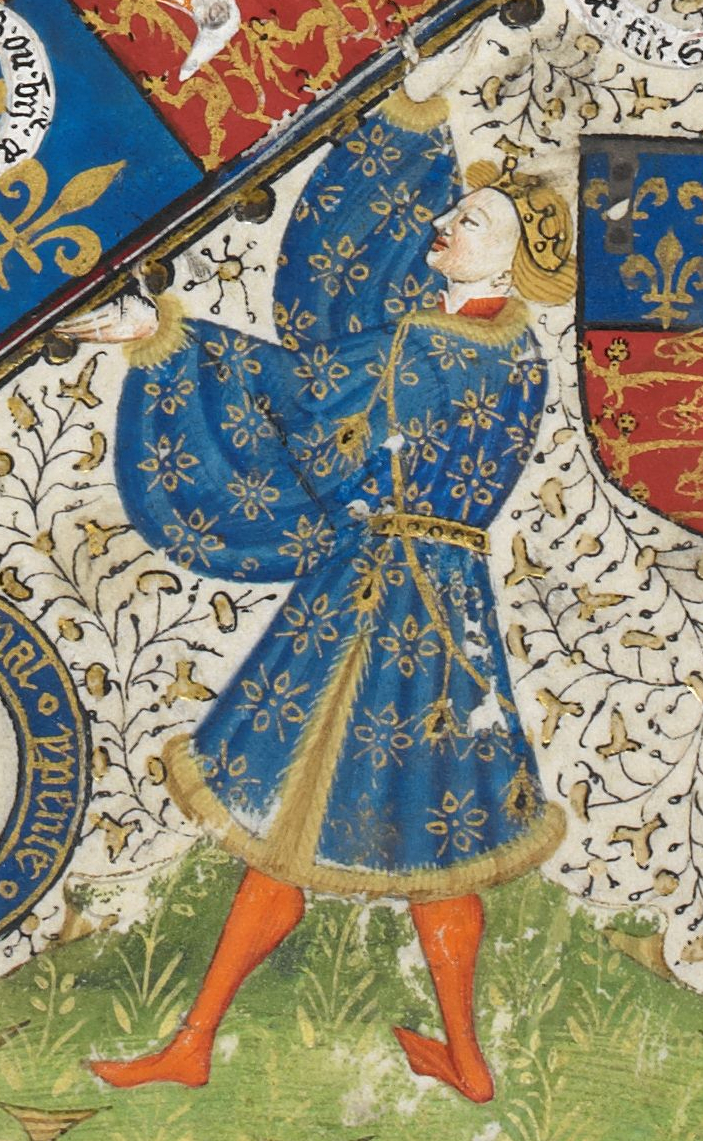
Richard of York

On 15 April 1450, the English suffered a major reversal in France at Formigny, which paved the way for the French reconquest of Normandy. That same year, there was a violent popular uprising in Kent, which is often seen as a precursor to the Wars of the Roses. The rebel manifesto, The Complaint of the Poor Commons of Kent, written under the stewardship of rebel leader Jack Cade, accused the crown of extortion, perversion of justice, and election fraud. The rebels occupied parts of London, and executed James Fiennes, the unpopular Lord High Treasurer. They dispersed after they were supposedly pardoned but several ringleaders, including Cade, were later executed. After the rebellion, the grievances of Cade and his followers formed the basis of Richard of York's opposition to a royal government from which he felt unduly excluded. Richard of York used the opportunity to return from Ireland and went to London. Positioning himself as a reformer to demand better government, he was eventually imprisoned for much of 1452 and 1453. By the summer of the latter year, Richard seemed to have lost the power struggle.

Throughout these quarrels, Henry himself had taken little part in proceedings. He displayed several symptoms of mental illness, possibly inherited from his maternal grandfather, Charles VI of France. His near-total lack of leadership in military matters had left the English forces in France scattered and weak, making them ripe for defeat at Formigny in 1450. Henry was described as more interested in matters of religion and learning, which, coupled with his timid and passive nature and aversion to warfare, made him an ineffectual king for the time. On 17 July 1453, the English forces in southern France suffered a catastrophic defeat at Castillon, and England lost all her possessions in France except for the Pale of Calais, shifting the balance of power in Europe and ending the Hundred Years' War. Perhaps in reaction to the news, Henry suffered a complete mental breakdown, during which he failed to recognise his newborn son, Edward. On 22 March 1454, Cardinal John Kemp, the Lord Chancellor, died and Henry could not be induced to nominate a successor, thus making government in the king's name constitutionally impossible.

The lack of central authority led to a continued deterioration of the unstable political situation, which polarised around long-standing feuds between the more powerful noble families, in particular the Percy-Neville feud and the Bonville-Courtenay feud, creating a volatile political climate ripe for civil war. To ensure the country could be governed, a Regency Council was established and, despite the protests of Margaret, was led by Richard of York, who was appointed Lord Protector and Chief Councillor on 27 March 1454. York appointed his brother-in-law, Richard Neville, Earl of Salisbury, to the post of Chancellor, backing the Nevilles against their chief adversary, Henry Percy, Earl of Northumberland. In backing the Nevilles, York gained a key ally, Salisbury's son Richard Neville, 16th Earl of Warwick, one of the wealthiest and most powerful magnates in the kingdom. York removed Somerset from his position and imprisoned him in the Tower of London.

In 1455, Henry made a surprise recovery from his mental instability, and reversed much of Richard of York's progress. Somerset was released and restored to favour, and York was forced out of court into exile. However, disaffected nobles, chiefly the Earl of Warwick and his father the Earl of Salisbury, backed the claims of the rival House of York to control of the government. Henry, Somerset, and a select council of nobles elected to hold a Great Council at Leicester on 22 May, away from Somerset's enemies in London. Fearing that charges of treason would be brought against them, York and his allies gathered an army to intercept the royal party at St Albans, before they could reach the Council.

== York's revolt (1455–1461) ==
=== St. Albans ===
Richard of York, 3rd Duke of York (Note: Richard of York, 3rd Duke of York is referred to in the text as "York".) led a force of around 3,000–7,000 troops south toward London, where they were met by Henry's force of 2,000 at St Albans, north of London, on 22 May 1455. Though the ensuing struggle resulted in fewer than 160 casualties combined, it was a decisive Yorkist victory in which many of York and the Neville family's most influential foes were killed, including Edmund Beaufort, 2nd Duke of Somerset, Henry Percy, 2nd Earl of Northumberland, and Thomas Clifford, 8th Baron de Clifford. King Henry VI had been taken prisoner by York's men, who had found the monarch hiding in a local tanner's shop, abandoned by his courtiers and advisors. With the king in his custody and many of his key rivals dead, York was again appointed Lord Protector by Parliament, and the Yorkist faction regained their position of influence.

York's allies were soon in ascendancy thanks to the temporarily stabilised situation, particularly the young Richard Neville, 16th Earl of Warwick, who, in his capacity as Captain of Calais, had conducted anti-piracy operations in the English Channel. Warwick rapidly overtook his father, Richard Neville, 5th Earl of Salisbury, as York's key ally, protecting York from retribution in Parliament. Warwick's position as commander of the strategically important port of Calais also gave him command of England's largest standing army. Henry's consort, Margaret of Anjou, considered Warwick a serious threat to the throne and attempted to cut off his supplies, however a French attack on Sandwich in August 1457 ignited fears of a French invasion, forcing Margaret to concede and provide Warwick with the funding he required to protect the realm. However, in February 1456, Henry recovered his mental faculties, and once again relieved York of his office as Lord Protector, reassuming personal governance over the realm. Despite the tenuous peace, disorder was returning to the kingdom as sporadic fighting once more broke out between the Neville and Percy families. To quell the growing discontent, Henry attempted to broker a public display of reconciliation between the two sides at St. Paul's Cathedral on 25 March 1458, however, no sooner had the procession dispersed than the plotting resumed.

=== York's attempt to take the throne ===
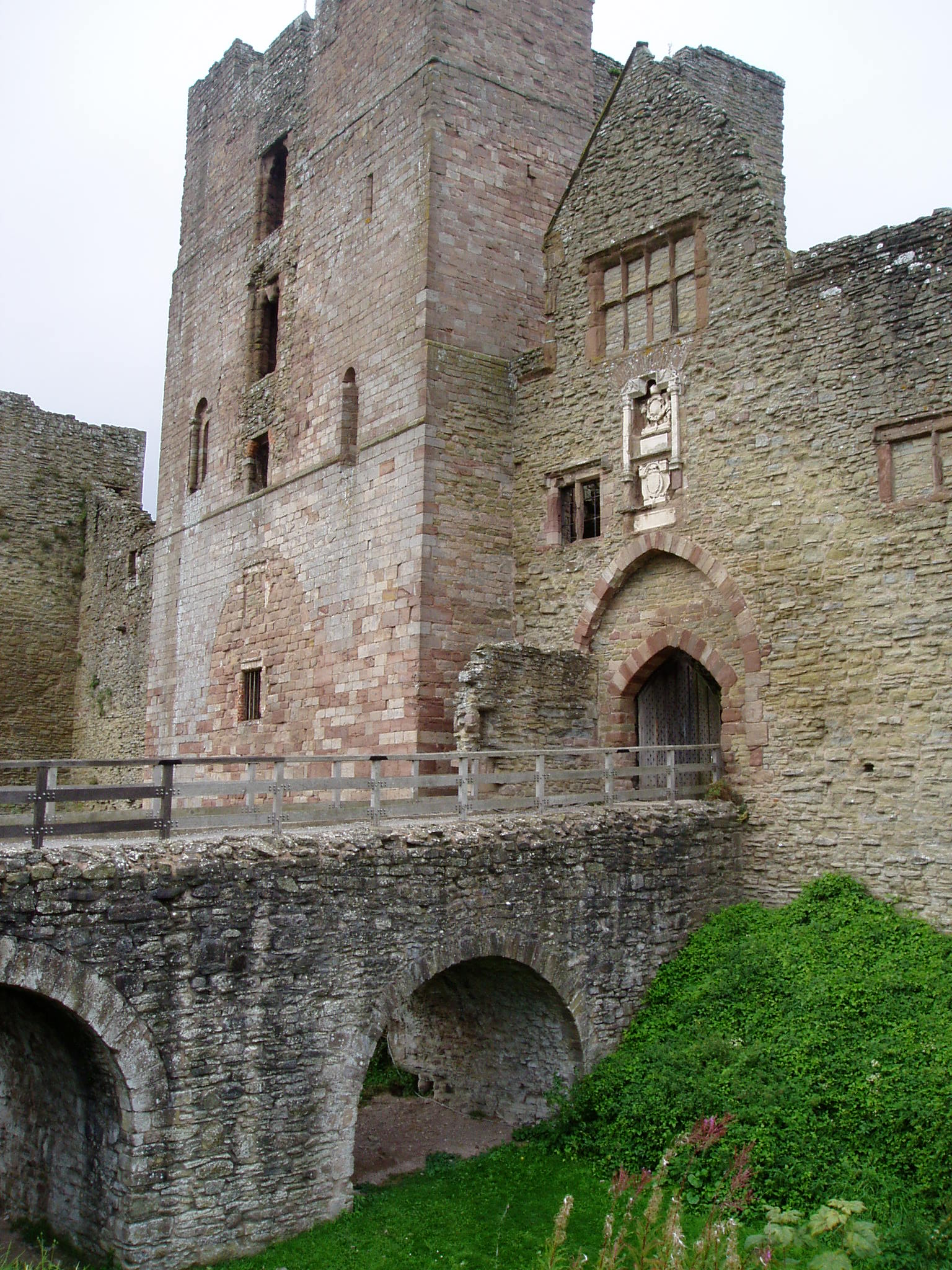
Richard of York's stronghold; Ludlow Castle, South Shropshire

Meanwhile, as Henry attempted in vain to secure peace in England, Warwick, in disregard of royal authority, had conducted attacks against the Castilian fleet in May 1458, and against a fleet of the Hanseatic League a few weeks later. His position in Calais also enabled him to establish relations with Charles VII of France, and Philip the Good of Burgundy, international connections that would serve him in the future. In response to the attacks, Warwick was summoned to London to face inquiries along with York and Salisbury. However, fearing arrest once they were isolated from their allies, they refused. York instead summoned the Nevilles to rendezvous at his stronghold of Ludlow Castle in the Welsh Marches; Warwick departed Calais with a portion of the garrison there to join the main Yorkist forces.

Margaret had not been idle during this time and had been actively recruiting armed support for Henry, distributing a livery emblem of a silver swan to knights and squires enlisted by her personally. Before Warwick could join them, the Yorkist army of 5,000 troops under Salisbury was ambushed by a Lancastrian force twice their size under James Tuchet, 5th Baron Audley at Blore Heath on 23 September 1459. The Lancastrian army was defeated, and Baron Audley himself killed in the fighting. In September, Warwick crossed over into England and made his way north to Ludlow. At nearby Ludford Bridge, the Yorkist forces were scattered due to the defection of Warwick's Calais troops under Andrew Trollope.

Forced to flee, York, who was still Lieutenant of Ireland, left for Dublin with his second son, Edmund, Earl of Rutland, while Warwick and Salisbury sailed to Calais accompanied by York's heir, Edward, Earl of March. The Lancastrian faction appointed the new Duke of Somerset, Henry Beaufort to replace Warwick in Calais, however, the Yorkists managed to retain the loyalty of the garrison. Fresh from their victory at Ludford Bridge, the Lancastrian faction assembled a "Parliament of Devils" at Coventry with the sole purpose of attainting York, his sons, Salisbury, and Warwick, however, the actions of this assembly caused many uncommitted lords to fear for their titles and property. In March 1460, Warwick sailed to Ireland under the protection of the Gascon Lord of Duras to concert plans with York, evading the royal fleet commanded by Henry Holland, 3rd Duke of Exeter, before they returned to Calais.

In late June 1460, Warwick, Salisbury, and Edward of March crossed the Channel and rode north to London, where they enjoyed widespread support. Salisbury was left with a force to besiege the Tower of London, while Warwick and March pursued Henry northward.

The Yorkists caught up with the Lancastrians and defeated them at Northampton on 10 July 1460. Humphrey Stafford, 1st Duke of Buckingham, John Talbot, 2nd Earl of Shrewsbury, John Beaumont, 1st Viscount Beaumont, and Thomas Percy, 1st Baron Egremont were all killed defending their king. For a second time, Henry was taken prisoner by the Yorkists, who escorted him to London, compelling the surrender of the Tower garrison.

That September, York returned from Ireland, and, at the Parliament of October that year, he made a symbolic gesture of his intention to claim the English crown by placing his hand upon the throne, an act which shocked the assembly. Even York's closest allies were not prepared to support such a move. Assessing York's claim, the judges felt that common law principles could not determine who had priority in the succession, and declared the matter "above the law and passed their learning". Finding a lack of decisive support for his claim among the nobility who at this stage had no desire to usurp Henry, a compromise was reached: the Act of Accord was passed on 25 October 1460, which stated that following Henry's death, his son Edward would be disinherited, and the throne would pass to York. However, the compromise was quickly found to be unpalatable, and hostilities resumed.

=== Death of Richard of York ===
Queen Margaret and her son had fled to Lancastrian-held Harlech Castle, where they joined Henry's half-brother Jasper Tudor and Henry Holland, 3rd Duke of Exeter, who were recruiting troops in Wales and the West Country. Margaret headed north to Scotland, where she successfully negotiated the use of Scottish troops and other aid for the Lancastrian cause from Queen Regent Mary of Guelders, in return for the surrender of Berwick, which a year prior, James II of Scotland, using the turmoil of the war as an opportunity tried to retake as well as Roxburgh. The latter, though successful, cost him his life. A similar successful negotiation was made for the use of French troops and aid for the Lancastrians cause that same year, this time in return for the surrender of Jersey, thus having the Auld Alliance backing the Lancastrian side to prevent the Yorkist ruled England from joining the Burgundian State in its war with France, a scenario that neither ally had the stomach for. The Lancastrians rallied in the North of England, where the Percy family were gathering support. They were joined by Somerset and Thomas Courtenay, 6th/14th Earl of Devon. York, his son the Earl of Rutland, and Salisbury left London to contain the Lancastrian threat in the north.

On 16 December 1460, York's vanguard clashed with Somerset's forces from the West Country at the Battle of Worksop, and was defeated. On 21 December, York reached his fortress of Sandal Castle near the town of Wakefield, with the Lancastrians encamped just 9 mi (14 km) away. For reasons unclear, York sortied from the castle on 30 December, and in the ensuing Battle of Wakefield, York, Rutland, and Warwick's younger brother Thomas Neville were all killed. Salisbury was captured the following night and executed.

=== Yorkist triumph (1461) ===
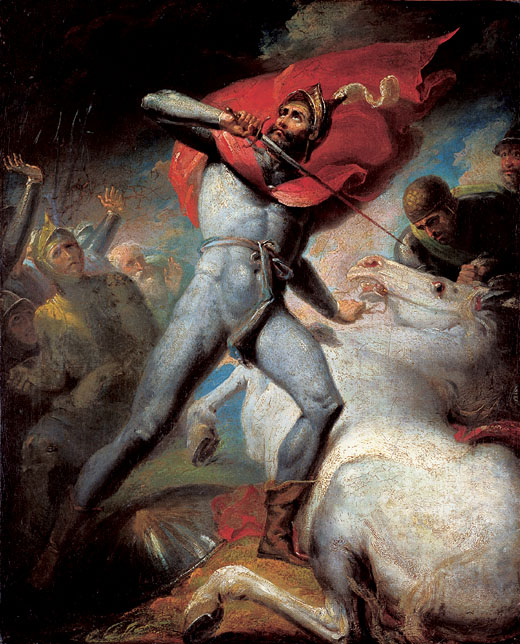
The Earl of Warwick's Vow by Henry Tresham representing Warwick the Kingmaker's alleged vow prior to the Battle of Towton.

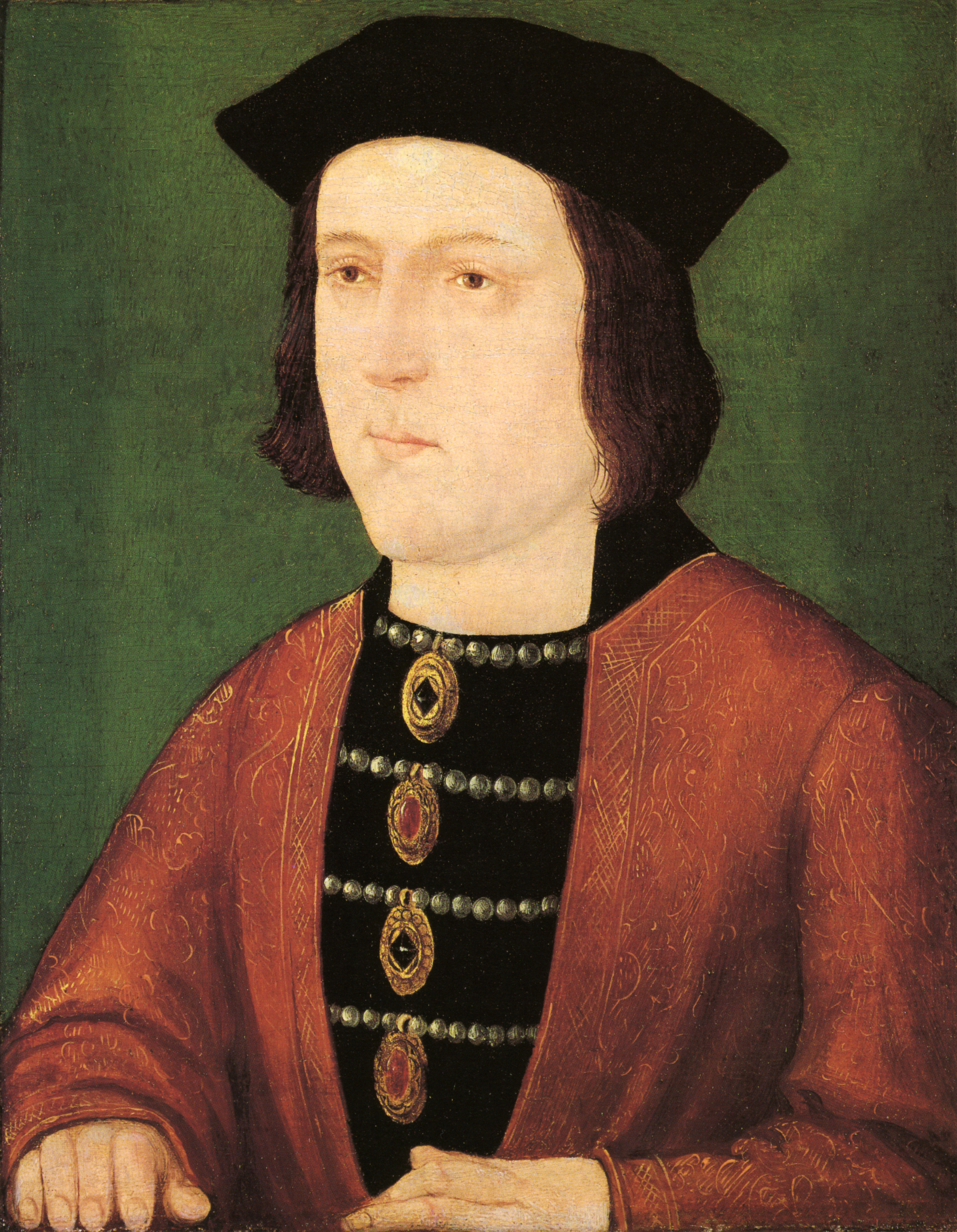
Edward IV of England

Following the Yorkist defeat at Wakefield, Richard, 3rd Duke of York's 18-year-old son, Edward, Earl of March, was now heir to the Dukedom of York, and thereby inherited Richard's claim to the throne. Edward sought to prevent the Lancastrian armies gathering under the Tudors in western England and Wales from joining the main Lancastrian forces opposing him in the north.

On 2 February 1461, he decisively defeated the Lancastrian armies at Mortimer's Cross, and the captured Owen Tudor, husband to Henry V's widow Catherine of Valois, was executed by his troops. As dawn broke across the field, a meteorological phenomenon known as parhelion occurred, giving the appearance of a trio of suns rising. Edward calmed his frightened troops by convincing them it represented the Holy Trinity, and therefore evidence of divine blessing upon their cause. Edward would later take the heraldic symbol of the sunne in splendour as his personal device.

In the north, having defeated and killed Richard, Margaret's troops and the victorious Lancastrians moved south, while Warwick, with the captive Henry in tow, moved his forces to meet them astride the ancient Roman road of Watling Street at St Albans. Warwick's forces were well-entrenched, but were ultimately defeated in the Second Battle of St Albans on 17 February.

Henry was freed by the Lancastrians, and knighted his young son Edward of Westminster, who in turn knighted thirty Lancastrian leaders. Warwick and his troops marched to rendezvous with the Yorkist troops in the Marches under Edward, fresh from their victory at Mortimer's Cross. Although the Lancastrians had the strategic advantage after St Albans, the Lancastrian cause was unpopular in London, and the citizenry refused entry to Margaret's troops. Warwick and Edward, seizing the initiative, marched rapidly to London, where Edward was proclaimed Edward IV of England by a hastily gathered assembly. Edward was a more attractive prospect as a monarch for the people of England; contemporaries such as Philippe de Commines describe him as energetic, handsome, affable, and struck an imposing sight in full armour and resplendent clothing, a deliberate move on the part of his supporters to contrast him with Henry, whose physical and mental frailties had fatally undermined his support.

To cement his position, Edward and Warwick moved north to confront the Lancastrians. Warwick, leading the Yorkist vanguard, inconclusively clashed with the Lancastrians at Ferrybridge on 28 March, at which Warwick was wounded, and the Lancastrian commanders, the Barons Clifford, and Neville (a distant relative of Warwick), were killed. Edward engaged the Lancastrians' main army the following day on 29 March near Towton, Yorkshire. The battle that followed was the largest and bloodiest ever fought on English soil, and resulted in a decisive triumph for Edward which broke the power of the Lancastrians in the north. The lynchpins of Lancastrian control in the royal court were either killed or fled the country; Henry Percy, 3rd Earl of Northumberland, was killed, Andrew Trollope, one of the most astute Lancastrian field commanders, was also killed, while James Butler, 5th Earl of Ormond, was captured and executed. Henry, Margaret, and their son Prince Edward fled north to Scotland. Edward returned to London for his coronation, while Warwick remained in the north to pacify further Lancastrian resistance. The Battle of Towton confirmed to the English people that Edward was the uncontested ruler of England, at least for the time being; as a result, Edward used this opportunity to employ a bill of attainder to forfeit the titles of 14 Lancastrian peers and 96 knights and minor members of the gentry.

== Yorkist rule under Edward IV (1461–1483) ==
=== Coronation of Edward IV and Warwick's apex ===
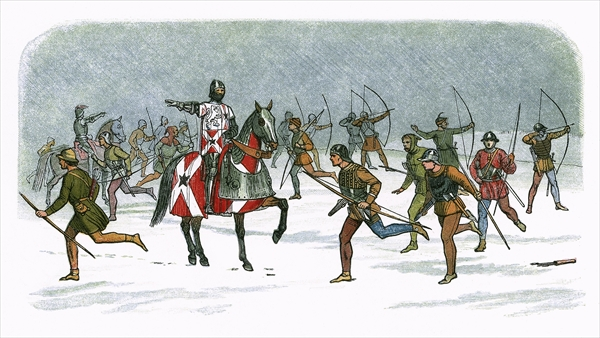
William Neville (mounted) directs his longbowmen at Towton – 19th century print

Edward was formally crowned King of England on 28 June 1461 in Westminster Abbey. Edward sought to win the affections of his vanquished foes; he pardoned many of the Lancastrians he attainted following his victory at Towton after they submitted to his rule, and permitted them to retain their property and titles.

For his part, Warwick benefited generously from Edward's patronage and became the most powerful noble in the country. He had inherited the lands and titles of both his parents, and was made High Admiral of England, Steward of the Duchy of Lancaster, along with several other offices of importance. In the summer of 1462, Warwick successfully negotiated a truce with Scotland, while at Piltown in Ireland, Yorkist forces under Thomas FitzGerald, 7th Earl of Desmond, decisively defeated the Lancastrians under John Butler, 6th Earl of Ormond, forcing the Ormonds into exile and ending Lancastrian designs on Ireland. That October, Margaret of Anjou invaded England with troops from France, and captured the castles of Alnwick and Bamburgh, although they were back in Yorkist hands within just three months.

In the spring of 1463, the north of England rose in revolt in support of Henry when Sir Ralph Percy laid siege to Norham Castle. Separate truces had been agreed with both Scotland and France by late 1463, allowing Warwick to recover much of the territory lost in the north by 1464. The main Lancastrian army moved south through Northumberland, however, and was destroyed by a Yorkist force under John Neville at Hexham on 15 May 1464. All three Lancastrian commanders, Henry Beaufort, 3rd Duke of Somerset, the Baron Ros, and the Baron Hungerford, were captured and executed. Yorkist troops captured the deposed king Henry in the woods near the River Ribble, and was taken to London where he was imprisoned in the Tower. With Somerset's army defeated and Henry captured, all effective resistance to Edward's rule had been wiped out.

Edward saw no profit in killing Henry while his son remained alive, instead preferring to keep the Lancastrian claim with a frail captive. Margaret and Prince Edward were compelled to leave Scotland and sailed for the court of Margaret's cousin, King Louis XI of France, where they maintained an impoverished court in exile for many years.

=== Discontent ===
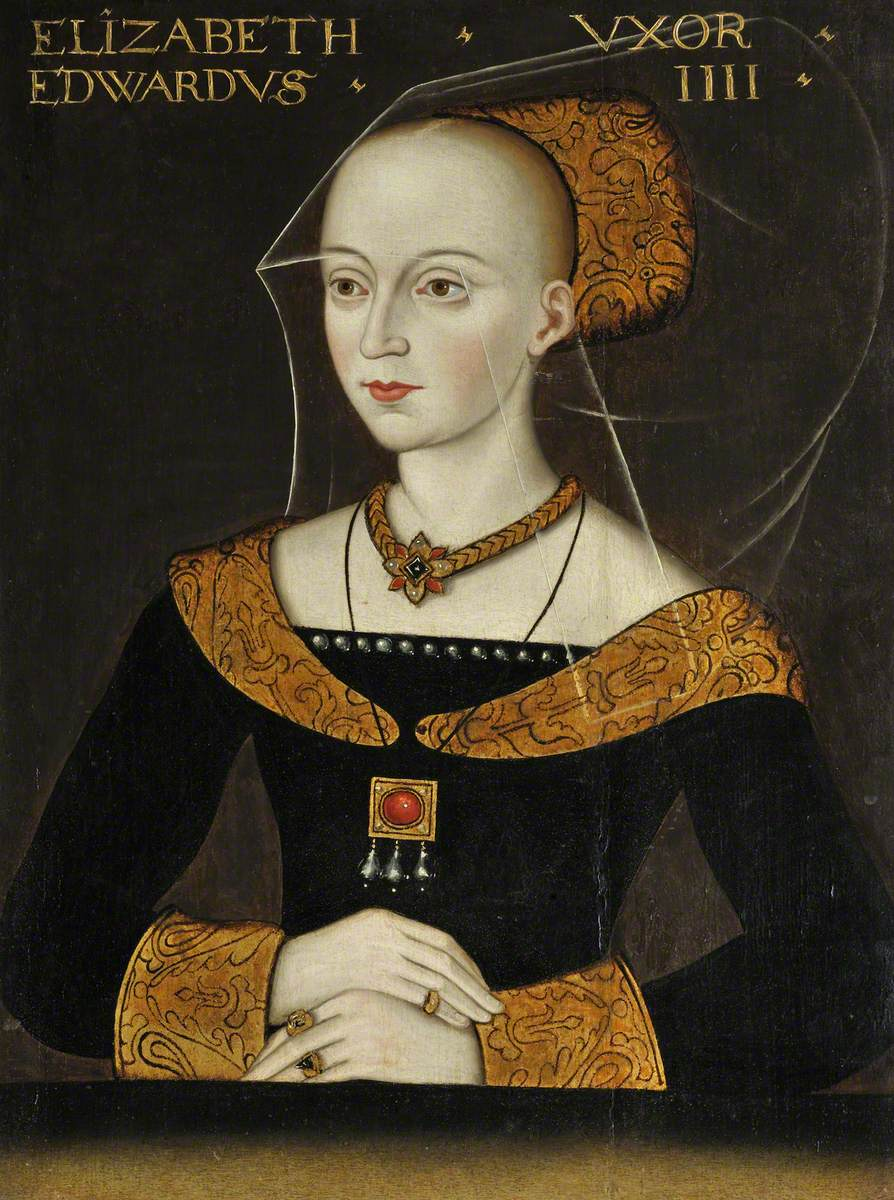
Elizabeth Woodville, queen consort to Edward IV

With his position upon the throne secure, Edward was free to pursue his domestic and foreign ambitions. Internationally, Edward favoured a strategic alliance with the Duchy of Burgundy but Warwick persuaded him to negotiate a treaty with Louis XI of France; at the negotiations, Warwick suggested Edward would be disposed to a marriage alliance with the French crown, the intended bride either being Louis' sister-in-law Bona of Savoy, or his daughter, Anne of France. To his considerable embarrassment and rage, Warwick discovered in October 1464 that four months earlier on 1 May, Edward had secretly married Elizabeth Woodville, the widow of a Lancastrian noble. Elizabeth had twelve siblings, some of whom married into prominent families, turning the Woodvilles into a powerful political establishment independent of Warwick's control. The move demonstrated that Warwick was not the power behind the throne as many had assumed and the marriage was criticised by Edward's Privy Councillors, who felt that marriage to a woman who was the daughter of neither a duke nor an earl was unbefitting a man of royal blood. Warwick attempted to restore his lost influence by accusing Elizabeth and her mother Jacquetta of Luxembourg of witchcraft, a ploy which failed but did not break the relationship between Warwick and Edward.

Edward's choice of bride plagued him politically for the rest of his reign. Politically, it opened Edward up to accusations that Warwick had been deceiving the French into believing the king was committed to the marriage proposal. Elizabeth's family began to ascend to positions of great importance; Edward's father-in-law, the Earl Rivers, was appointed as Lord High Treasurer, and supported the king's position for a Burgundian alliance. Without Warwick's knowledge, Edward had already concluded a treaty in secret with Burgundy in October 1467, while leaving Warwick to continue with doomed negotiations with the French court. In 1467, Edward removed Warwick's brother, the Archbishop of York, from his office of Lord Chancellor, while the king refused to entertain a marriage proposal between Warwick's eldest daughter, Isabel and Edward's brother, George Plantagenet, Duke of Clarence. For various reasons, Clarence greatly resented his brother's interference. In 1468, Edward retook Jersey from the French.

==== Redesdale's rebellion ====
In April 1469, a rebellion broke out in Yorkshire under a leader known only as Robin of Redesdale. A second pro-Lancastrian revolt broke out the following month, which demanded the restoration of Henry Percy as Earl of Northumberland. The revolt was quickly crushed by the earl, John Neville, though he made little attempt to quell Redesdale's actions. Warwick and Clarence had spent the summer assembling troops, officially to suppress the revolt but in early July they travelled to Calais, where Clarence and Isabel were married in a ceremony overseen by Warwick. They returned to London, where they assembled their troops, ostensibly to remove 'evil councillors' from the king's company and re-establish good governance and moved north to link with the Yorkshire rebels. Privately, Warwick hoped to depose Edward and install the nineteen-year-old Clarence on the throne.

Redesdale defeated royal troops at Edgcote on 26 July 1469; although Redesdale was reportedly killed, the two royal commanders, William Herbert, 1st Earl of Pembroke, and Humphrey Stafford, 1st Earl of Devon, were both captured and executed. Elizabeth Woodville's father, Lord Rivers, and brother Sir John Woodville were apprehended and murdered. After the battle, Edward was taken captive by George Neville and held at Middleham Castle. It soon became clear to the rebels that neither Warwick nor Clarence enjoyed significant support, and unable to quell the growing disorder, Edward was released in September of that year and re-assumed his duties as king. In March 1470, Warwick and Clarence exploited political instabilities to incite the 1470 Lincolnshire Rebellion, hoping to lure Edward north where he could be taken by Warwick's men. (Note: There has been debate over Warwick's actual involvement in the plot.) On 12 March 1470, Edward routed the Yorkist rebels at the Battle of Losecoat Field and captured the rebel leader, the Baron Willoughby, who named Warwick and Clarence as the "partners and chief provokers" of the rebellion. Physical evidence also came to light which proved the complicity of the two men, who fled to France in May. Willoughby was beheaded and his lands seized.

=== Rebellion by Warwick and Readeption of Henry VI (1470–1471) ===
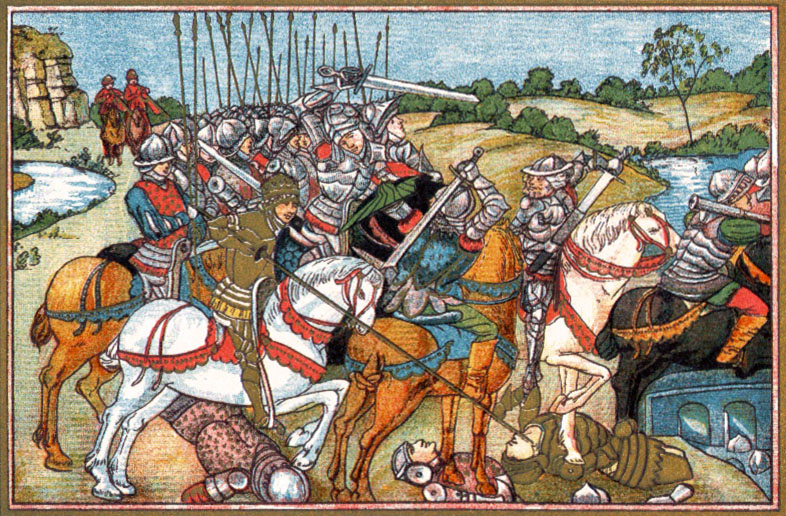
1885 lithograph portraying the rout of Warwick's forces at Barnet in the manner of Paolo Uccello

Seeking to capitalise on Warwick's disfavour with the king, Louis XI of France arranged a reconciliation between Warwick and his bitter rival, Margaret of Anjou, with the objective to restore Henry to the throne. As part of the arrangement, Warwick agreed to marry his daughter Anne to Edward of Westminster, Margaret and Henry's son and heir apparent; while the marriage was solemnised, it may not have been consummated, as Margaret was hoping to find a better match for her son once he became king. Staging a diversionary uprising in the north, Warwick and Clarence launched a two-pronged invasion of England at Dartmouth and Plymouth on 13 September 1470. Warwick's brother, the Marquess of Montagu joined him, bitter with the king that his support for the crown during the preceding revolts did not result in the restoration of his earldom. Edward rushed south to meet the invasion, while Montagu's forces advanced from the north, and the king found himself surrounded. With few options, Edward, his younger brother Richard, Duke of Gloucester, and several hundred retainers fled to Flanders on 2 October, then part of the Duchy of Burgundy, his ally. (Note: The date was not 29 September, as some sources state.)

The Readeption of Henry VI restored him as king, a throne which Warwick was now indisputably in effective control of. In November, Edward was attainted, and his brother Clarence was awarded the title of Duke of York. Burgundy was ruled by Charles the Bold, husband of Edward's sister Margaret. Charles rendered precious little assistance to his brother-in-law, something Edward would never forget. However, unfortunately for Warwick and Clarence, Henry's new regime was precariously unstable; Edmund Beaufort, 4th Duke of Somerset, held Warwick responsible for his father's death in 1455, and the ensuing internal disputes eventually left Warwick and Clarence politically isolated. With the backing of Flemish merchants, Edward landed at Ravenspurn in Yorkshire on 14 March 1471, supported by the Earl of Northumberland. Edward was joined by troops under Sir William Parr and Sir James Harrington, a move which convinced Clarence, who was politically disadvantaged by his agreement with the Lancastrians, to abandon Warwick and Henry and join his brother. Edward's army made rapidly for London, where they took the by now feeble king Henry prisoner and sent him to the Tower of London.

Poor weather contained French troops under Margaret and Edward of Westminster on the continent, preventing Warwick from being reinforced. Despite this and Clarence's defection, Warwick marched in pursuit of Edward's growing army, and the two sides met in battle at Barnet on 14 April 1471. Poor visibility due to thick mist and the similarity of Edward's heraldic sun to the Earl of Oxford's star led to the Lancastrians attacking their own men, and, coupled with Edward's determined attack, Warwick's army was destroyed. During the rout, Warwick was unhorsed and killed, along with his brother John Neville, 1st Marquess of Montagu, while Henry Holland, 3rd Duke of Exeter, was apprehended and imprisoned in the Tower of London. In 1475, Exeter would be sent on a Yorkist expedition to France, where he was reputed to have fallen overboard while at sea, and drowned without any witnesses. Warwick's defeat and death was a catastrophic blow for the Lancastrian cause, and the Neville family's political influence was irrevocably broken.

=== Defeat of Henry VI by Edward IV ===
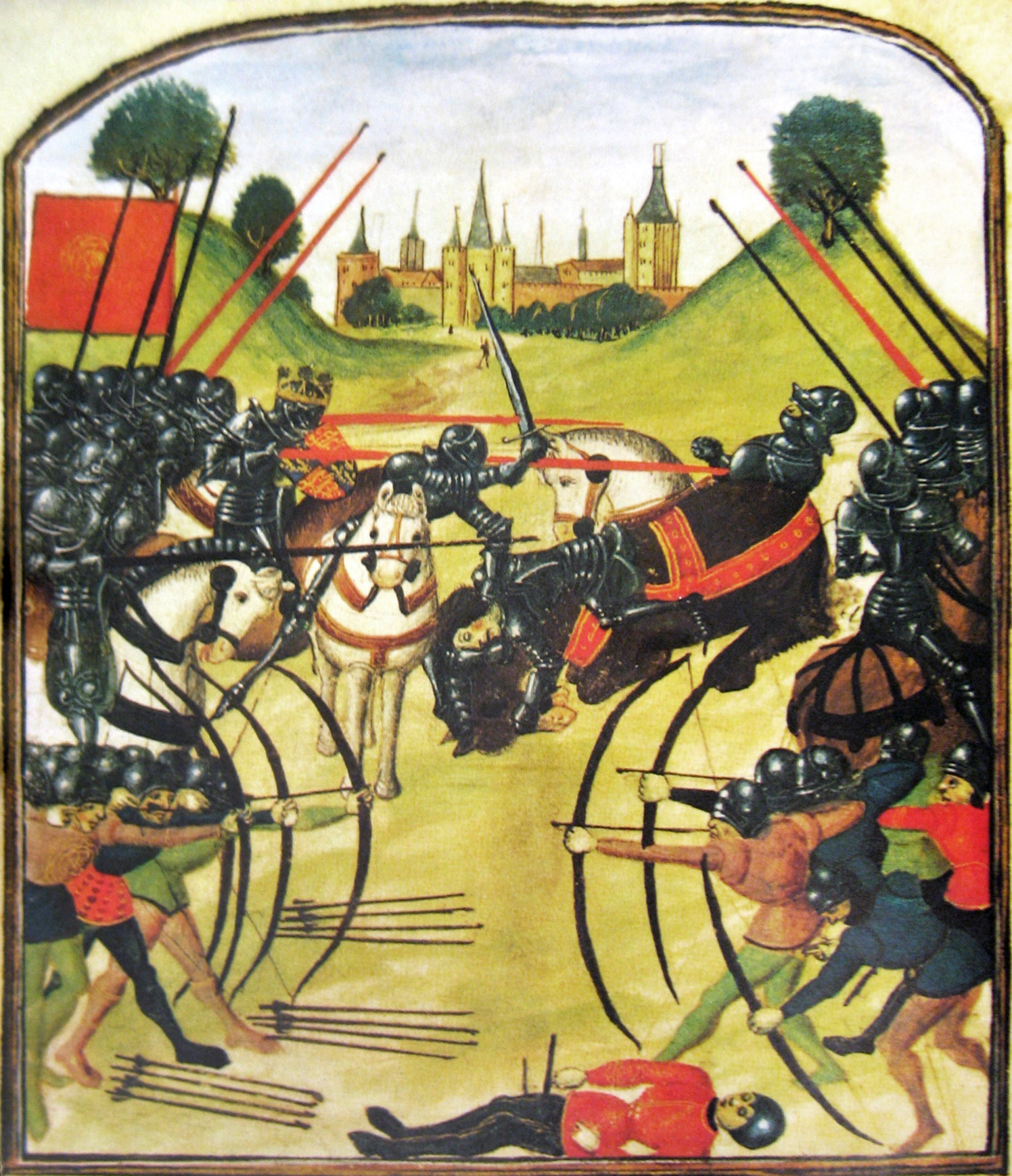
The Battle of Tewkesbury in 1471

The return of Henry VI to the throne did not last long. Though the Nevilles had been defeated, on the same day of the clash at Barnet, Margaret had managed to land her forces at Weymouth, and augmented her army with recruits from the Welsh Marches. Despite the heavy defeat they had suffered at Barnet, survivors from the battle rallied around the Lancastrian queen. Edward moved to intercept the Lancastrian army, realising they were attempting to cross the River Severn into Wales. Acting upon correspondence sent by Henry VI, Sir Richard Beauchamp, governor of Gloucester, barred the gates to Margaret's troops, preventing the Lancastrians from crossing in time. On 4 May 1471, Edward intercepted and engaged Margaret's army at Tewkesbury, defeating it. Henry VI and Margaret's only son, Edward of Westminster, was killed by Clarence's men, while the Duke of Somerset and John Courtenay, 15th Earl of Devon, were both killed.

The royal propagandist of the Historie of the arrivall of Edward IV suggests the royal army was, "though small, well-armed and determined" and that Edward claimed he had returned solely for his duchy of York. However, Henry VI could not start raising a force of any numbers until well to the south (of England), in Lord Hastings' estates in the Midlands (about 3,000 men in Nottingham, where he was joined by William Parr and James Harrington, with their personal forces of sixty men-at-arms). Whereas, in the north, came "not so many as supposed would have come", reported the Arrivalist.

Edward IV entered London on 21 May. Henry VI died that night, or soon afterwards, perhaps on Edward's orders. A contemporary chronicle (favourable to Edward IV) reported Henry's death as caused by "melancholy" after hearing of his son's death. It is widely suspected however, that with Henry's only heir dead, Edward had ordered the former king's murder. Margaret of Anjou was imprisoned until she was ransomed by Louis XI in 1475 to France, where she would live for the remainder of her life, dying on 25 August 1482.

=== Second reign of Edward IV ===
With the defeats at Barnet and Tewkesbury, armed Lancastrian resistance appeared to be at an end. However, Edward IV's regime was progressively fractured by a worsening feud between his brothers, George Plantagenet, Duke of Clarence, and Richard, Duke of Gloucester. On 22 December 1476, Clarence's wife Isabel died. Clarence accused one of the late Isabel's ladies-in-waiting, Ankarette Twynho, of having murdered her, and, in turn, Clarence murdered her. Ankarette's grandson received a retrospective pardon for Ankarette from Edward in 1478, illustrating the quasi-monarchical attitude of Clarence which Edward was growing wary of. In 1477, Clarence was proposed as a suitor for Mary, who had just become Duchess of Burgundy, but Edward objected to the match, and Clarence left the royal court.

For his part, Gloucester was married to Anne Neville; both Anne and Isabel were daughters of the Countess of Warwick, and therefore heirs to their mother's considerable fortune. Many of the estates held by the two brothers had been bestowed upon them by Edward's patronage (who retained the right to revoke them). This was not the case with property acquired through marriage; this difference fuelled the disagreement. Clarence continued to fall out of favour with Edward; persistently widespread claims he was involved in a revolt against Edward led to his imprisonment and execution at the Tower of London on 18 February 1478.

Edward's reign was relatively peaceful domestically; in 1475 he invaded France, however he signed the Treaty of Picquigny with Louis XI whereby Edward withdrew after receiving an initial payment of 75,000 crowns plus an annual pension of 50,000 crowns, while in 1482, he attempted to usurp the Scottish throne but was ultimately compelled to withdraw back to England. Nevertheless, they were successful in retaking Berwick. In 1483, Edward's health began to fail and he fell fatally ill that Easter. Prior to his death, he named his brother Richard to act as Lord Protector for his twelve-year-old son and successor, Edward V. On 9 April 1483, Edward IV died.

== Yorkist rule under Richard III and defeat (1483–1485) ==
=== Overview ===
Richard III (2 October 1452 – 22 August 1485) was King of England and Lord of Ireland from 26 June 1483 until his death in 1485. He was the last king of the House of York and the last of the Plantagenet dynasty. His defeat and death at the Battle of Bosworth Field, the last battle of the Wars of the Roses, marked the end of the Middle Ages in England. Richard was created Duke of Gloucester in 1461 after the accession of his brother King Edward IV. In 1472, he married Anne Neville, daughter of Richard Neville, 16th Earl of Warwick. He governed northern England during Edward's reign, and played a role in the invasion of Scotland in 1482. When Edward IV died in April 1483, Richard was named Lord Protector of the realm for Edward's eldest son and successor, the 12-year-old Edward V. Arrangements were made for Edward V's coronation on 22 June 1483. Before the king could be crowned, the marriage of his parents was declared bigamous and therefore invalid.

Officially illegitimate, their children were barred from inheriting the throne. On 25 June, an assembly of lords and commoners endorsed a declaration to this effect and proclaimed Richard as the rightful king. He was crowned on 6 July 1483. Edward and his younger brother Richard of Shrewsbury, Duke of York, called the "Princes in the Tower", were not seen in public after August and accusations circulated that they had been murdered on King Richard's orders. There were two major rebellions against Richard during his reign. In October 1483, a revolt was led by staunch allies of Edward IV and Richard's former ally, Henry Stafford, 2nd Duke of Buckingham. Then, in August 1485, Henry Tudor and his uncle, Jasper Tudor, landed in southern Wales with a contingent of French troops and marched through Pembrokeshire, recruiting soldiers. Henry's forces defeated Richard's army near the Leicestershire town of Market Bosworth. Richard was slain, making him the last English king to die in battle. Henry Tudor ascended the throne as Henry VII.

=== Edward V's claims to the throne ===
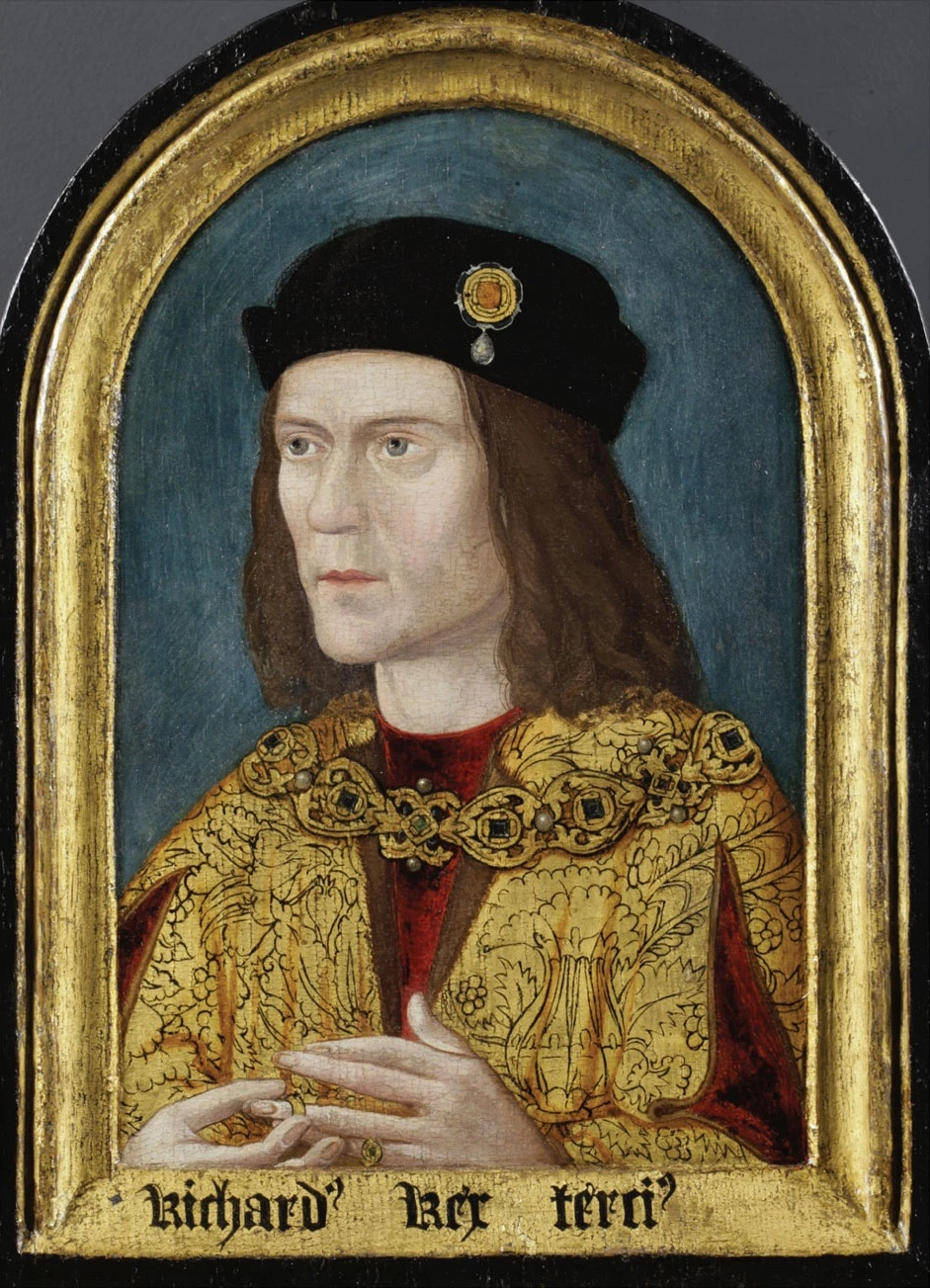
King Richard III reigned 1483–1485 as the final York monarch (artist unknown)

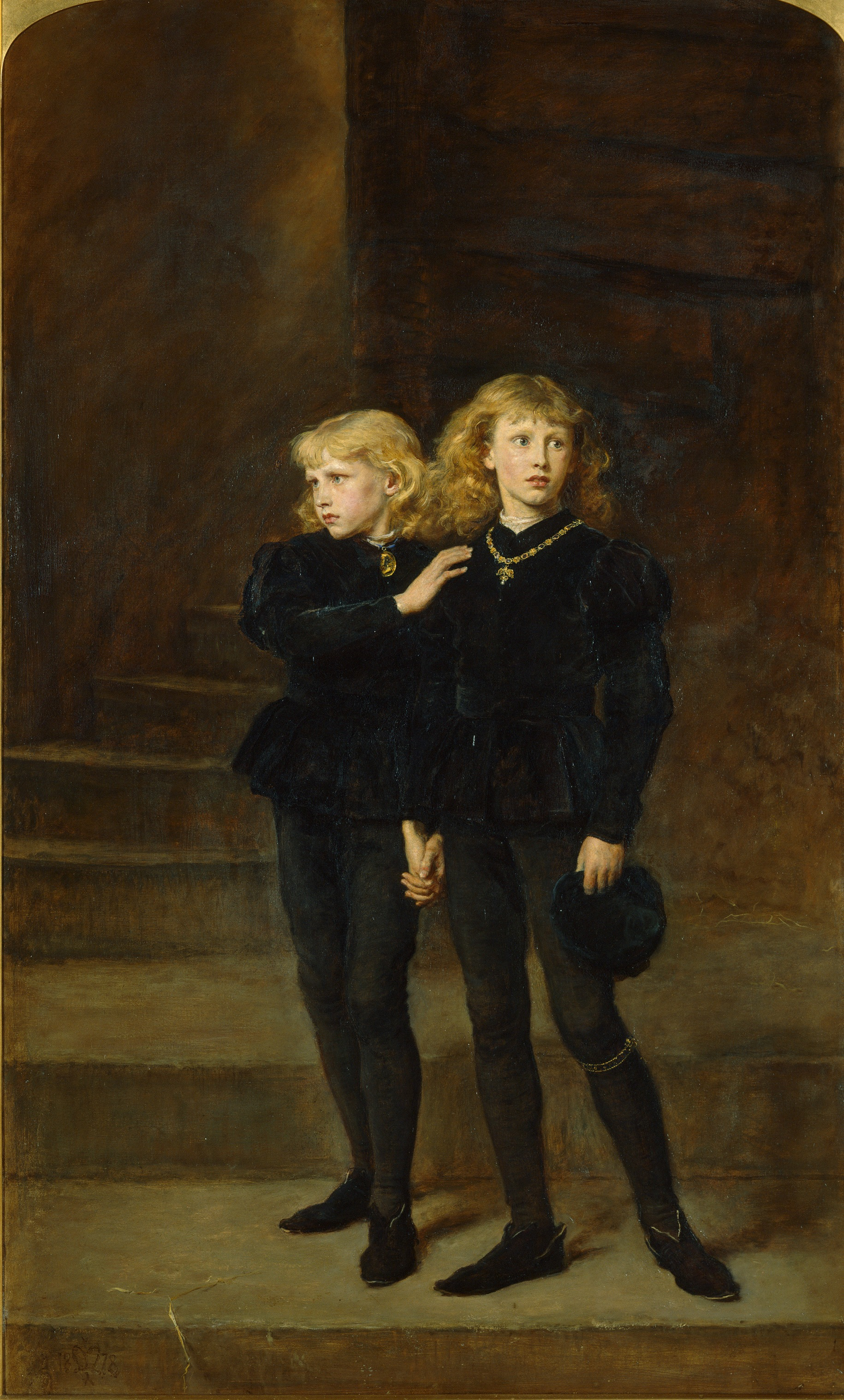
The Princes in the Tower: Richard III's nephews, King Edward V and Richard of Shrewsbury (The Princes in the Tower by John Everett Millais, 1878)

During Edward IV's reign, his brother Richard, Duke of Gloucester, had risen to become the most powerful magnate in the north of England, particularly in the city of York where his popularity was high. Prior to his death, the king had named Richard as Lord Protector to act as regent to his twelve-year-old son, Edward V. Richard's allies, particularly Henry Stafford, Duke of Buckingham, and the powerful and wealthy Baron William Hastings, the Lord Chamberlain, urged Richard to bring a strong force to London to counter any move the Woodville family might make. Richard departed Yorkshire for London, where he intended to meet the young king at Northampton and travel to London together. Following Edward IV's death, the Dowager Queen Elizabeth instructed her brother, Anthony Woodville, Earl Rivers, to escort her son Edward V to London with an armed escort of 2,000 men.

However, upon reaching Northampton, Richard discovered that the king had already been sent onward to Stony Stratford in Buckinghamshire. In response, and to forestall any Woodville family attempts on his person, on 30 April 1483, Richard had Earl Rivers, Edward's half-brother Richard Grey, and Edward's chamberlain Thomas Vaughan arrested and sent to the north. Richard and Edward journeyed to London together, where the young king took up residence at the Tower of London on 19 May 1483, joined the following month by his younger brother, Richard of Shrewsbury, Duke of York.

=== Richard III takes the throne ===
Despite his assurances to the contrary, Richard had Earl Rivers, Grey, and Vaughan beheaded in June 1483. Acting as Lord Protector, Richard repeatedly stalled the coronation of Edward V, despite the urging of the king's councillors, who wished to avoid another protectorate. That same month, Richard accused the Lord Chamberlain, the Baron Hastings, of treason, and had him executed without trial on 13 June. Hastings had been popular, and his death created considerable controversy, not least because his loyalty to Edward and his continued presence would have presented a major obstacle to Richard's path to securing the throne. A clergyman, likely Robert Stillington, the Bishop of Bath and Wells, informed Richard that Edward IV's marriage to Elizabeth Woodville was invalid because of Edward's earlier union to Eleanor Butler, thereby making Edward V and his siblings illegitimate heirs to the throne.

On 22 June, the selected date for Edward's coronation, a sermon was preached outside St. Paul's Cathedral declaring Richard the rightful king, a post which the citizenry petitioned Richard to accept. Richard accepted four days later, and was crowned at Westminster Abbey on 6 July 1483.

==== Conflicts and actions against opposing claims ====
Edward and his brother Richard of Shrewsbury, who were still in residence in the Tower of London, had completely disappeared by the summer of 1483. The fate of the two princes following their disappearance remains a mystery to this day, however, the most widely accepted explanation is that they were murdered on the orders of Richard III.

Stripped of her family's influence at court, the widowed Elizabeth Woodville, along with Richard's disaffected former ally Henry Stafford, 2nd Duke of Buckingham, allied themselves with Lady Margaret Beaufort, who began to actively promote her son, Henry Tudor, a great-great-great-grandson of Edward III and the closest male heir of the Lancastrian claim, (Note: Henry Tudor's claim to the throne was weak, owing to a declaration of Henry IV that barred the accession to the throne of any heirs of the legitimised offspring of his father John of Gaunt by his third wife Katherine Swynford. The original act legitimising the children of John of Gaunt and Katherine Swynford passed by Parliament and the bull issued by the Pope in the matter legitimised them fully, making questionable the legality of Henry IV's declaration.) as an alternative to Richard.

Woodville proposed to strengthen Henry's claim by marrying him to her daughter Elizabeth of York, the only living heir to Edward IV. Convinced of the need for Yorkist support, Henry promised his hand to Elizabeth well before his planned invasion of England, a factor which caused many Yorkists to abandon Richard. By September 1483, a conspiracy against Richard began to be formulated among members of the disaffected English gentry, many of whom had been staunch supporters of Edward IV and his heirs.

==== Buckingham's Rebellion ====
Since Edward IV had regained the throne in 1471, Henry Tudor had lived in exile at the court of Francis II, Duke of Brittany. Henry was half-guest half-prisoner, since Francis regarded Henry, his family, and his courtiers as valuable bargaining tools to barter for the aid of England, particularly in conflicts with France, and therefore shielded the exiled Lancastrians well, repeatedly refusing to surrender them. Henry, in particular, was supported by the Breton treasurer Pierre Landais, who hoped that an overthrow of Richard would cement a joint Anglo-Breton alliance. Now in alliance with Richard's former supporter, Henry Stafford, 2nd Duke of Buckingham, Francis provided Henry with 40,000 gold crowns, 15,000 troops, and a fleet of ships to invade England. However, Henry's forces were scattered by a storm, compelling Henry to abandon the invasion. Nevertheless, Buckingham had already launched a revolt against Richard on 18 October 1483 with the aim of installing Henry as king. Buckingham raised a substantial number of troops from his Welsh estates, and planned to join his brother the Earl of Devon.

However, without Henry's troops, Richard easily defeated Buckingham's rebellion, and the defeated duke was captured, convicted of treason, and executed in Salisbury on 2 November 1483. Following the rebellion in January 1484, Richard stripped Elizabeth Woodville of all the lands bestowed upon her during her late husband's reign. For the sake of outward appearances, the two appeared to reconcile.

=== Defeat of Richard III ===
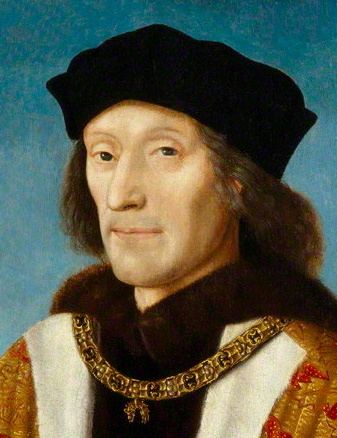
Henry VII of England

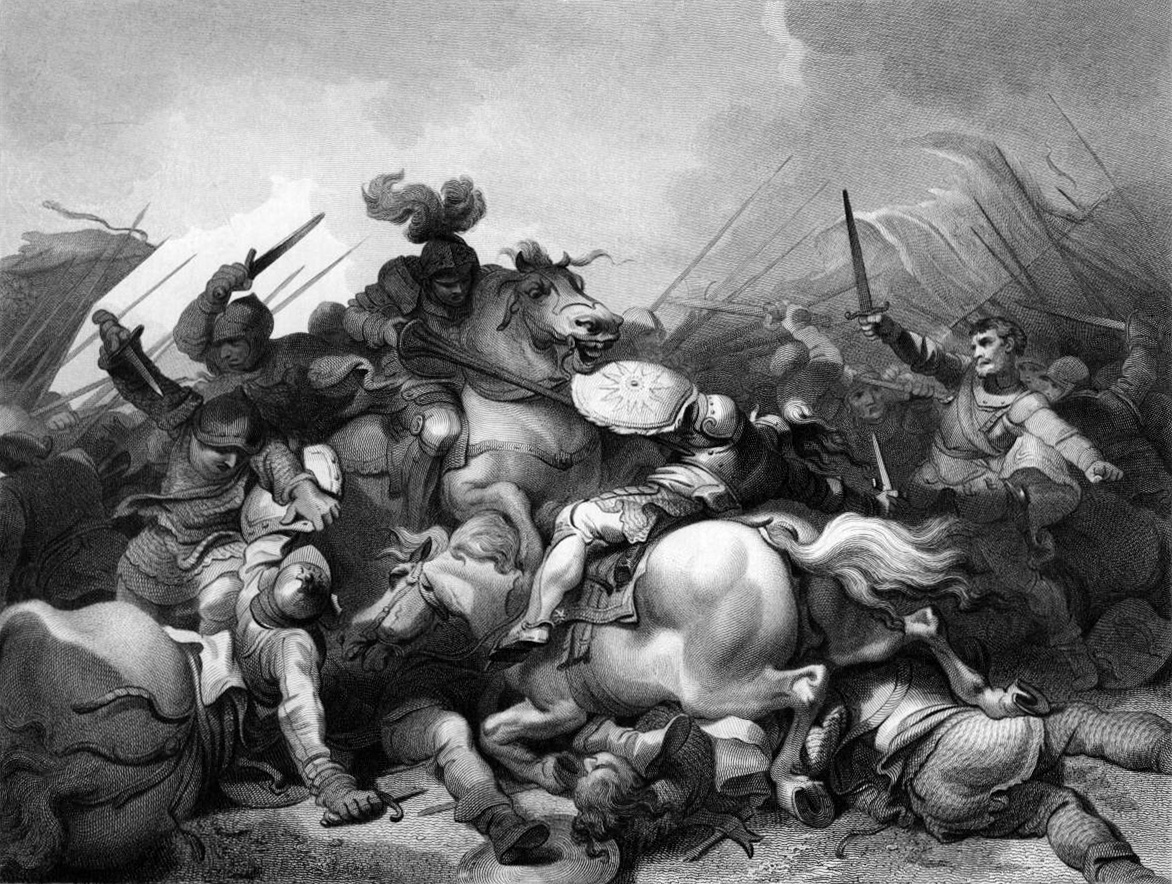
The Battle of Bosworth Field, fought on 22 August 1485

Following Buckingham's failed revolt, some 500 Englishmen fled to Rennes, the capital of Brittany to join Henry in exile. Richard opened negotiations with Francis for Henry's extradition to England, however, the Duke continued to refuse, hoping for the possibility of extracting more generous concessions from Richard in exchange. By mid-1484, Francis was incapacitated from illness, leaving Landais to take the reins of government. Richard made overtures to Landais, offering military support to defend Brittany against a possible French attack; Landais agreed, however, Henry escaped to France by mere hours. Henry was warmly received at the court of Charles VIII of France, who supplied Henry with resources for his coming invasion. Upon the recovery of Francis II, Charles offered the remaining Lancastrians in Brittany safe conduct to France, paying for their expenses himself. For Charles, Henry and his supporters were useful political pawns to ensure Richard did not intervene with French designs on the acquisition of Brittany.

On 16 March 1485, Richard's wife, Anne Neville, died. Rumours quickly spread that she had been murdered to allow Richard to marry his niece, Elizabeth of York, rumours which alienated Richard's northern supporters. Richard's marriage to Elizabeth had the potential of unravelling the Tudor plans, and split the Yorkists who supported Henry from their cause. Henry secured the patronage of the French regent Anne of Beaujeu, who supplied him with 2,000 troops in support. Overseas, Henry relied heavily on his mother Margaret of Beaufort to raise troops and support for him in England. Anxious to press his claim, with the backing of the Woodvilles, Henry set sail from France on 1 August with a force consisting of his English and Welsh exiles, along with a large contingent of French and Scottish troops, landing near Dale, Pembrokeshire, in Wales. Henry's return to his Welsh homeland was regarded by some as the fulfilment of a Messianic prophecy, as "the youth of Brittany defeating the Saxons" and restore their country to glory. Henry amassed an army of approximately 5,000 troops to confront Richard. Richard's lieutenant in Wales, Sir Walter Herbert, failed to move against Henry, and two of his officers deserted to the Tudor claimant with their troops. Richard's lieutenant in West Wales, Rhys ap Thomas, also defected. By mid-August, Henry crossed the English border, advancing on Shrewsbury.

Richard, who had been well-informed of Henry's movements, had ordered a mobilisation of his troops. The powerful Stanleys had assembled their bannermen upon hearing of Henry's landing; while they had been communicating on friendly terms with Henry both prior to and during his landfall in England, their forces were a wildcard, and would not support Henry until a decisive juncture in the coming battle. On 22 August 1485, Henry Tudor's outnumbered forces engaged Richard's army in the Battle of Bosworth Field. Stanley's forces entered the fray on behalf of Henry, decisively defeating Richard's army. Polydore Vergil, Henry's official historian, records that "King Richard, alone, was killed fighting manfully in the thickest press of his enemies", and became the last English king to die in battle. Richard's ally the Earl of Northumberland fled, while the Duke of Norfolk was killed, and Thomas Howard, Earl of Surrey, was taken captive. Henry claimed the throne by right of conquest, retroactively dating his claim to the day prior to Richard's defeat.

== Aftermath and Henry VII's reign (1485–1509) ==
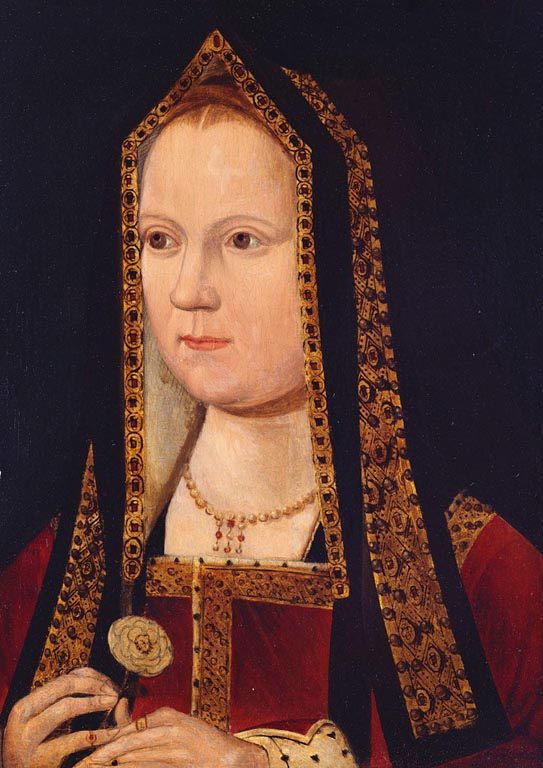
Elizabeth of York – Henry VII's marriage to Elizabeth united the rival Lancastrian and Yorkist claims to the throne

Henry was crowned as Henry VII of England on 30 October 1485 in Westminster Abbey. As per his pledge, Henry married Elizabeth of York on 18 January 1486, and Elizabeth gave birth to their first child just eight months later, Prince Arthur. The couple's marriage appears to have been a happy one; Henry in particular was noted for being uncharacteristically faithful for a king of the time. Henry and Elizabeth's marriage united the rival Lancastrian and Yorkist claims since their children would inherit the claims of both dynasties; however, paranoia persisted that anyone with blood ties to the Plantagenets were secretly coveting the throne.

=== Challengers to Henry VII ===
Despite the union of the two dynasties, Henry's position as king was not immediately secure. That same year he faced a rebellion of the Stafford brothers, aided and abetted by Viscount Lovell, but the revolt collapsed without any open fighting. The Stafford brothers claimed sanctuary at a church belonging to Abingdon Abbey in Culham, however, Henry had the Staffords forcibly removed by the knight Sir John Savage on 14 May and tried before the Court of the King's Bench, which ruled that sanctuary was inapplicable in matters of treason. Protests over Henry's actions were lodged with Pope Innocent VIII, which resulted in a papal bull that agreed to some modifications over the right of sanctuary. Henry also dealt with other potential threats to his reign; the heir to the male-line Yorkist claim was Edward, Earl of Warwick, the ten-year-old son of Edward IV's brother, George, Duke of Clarence. Henry had Warwick arrested and imprisoned at the Tower of London.

==== Lincoln's rebellion ====
Around this time, a Yorkist-sympathising priest by the name of Richard Symonds had noticed a striking similarity between a young boy, Lambert Simnel, and Richard of Shrewsbury, one of the Princes in the Tower, and began tutoring the boy in the manners of the royal court, perhaps hoping to put forth Simnel as an impostor Prince Richard. The rumour spread that Edward IV's children were still alive, however, the false report of the death of the imprisoned Earl of Warwick, who was roughly the same age as Simnel, changed the impersonation. John de la Pole, 1st Earl of Lincoln, who himself had a claim on the throne as a Plantagenet descendant and Richard III's nephew, left the royal court on 19 March 1487 for Burgundy to capitalise on the rumours. His aunt, Margaret, Duchess of Burgundy provided him with financial and military support. The Yorkist exiles sailed for Ireland, where the Yorkist cause was popular, to gather support. Simnel was proclaimed King Edward VI in Dublin despite Henry's efforts to quell the rumours, which included parading the real Earl of Warwick through the streets of London. While nominally supporting the impostor king, Lincoln likely saw the whole affair as an opportunity to claim the throne for himself.

Lincoln had no intention of remaining in Ireland, and with Simnel, 2,000 German mercenaries and an additional large host of Irish troops, landed on Piel Island in Lancashire and proceeded to march on York. Though the Yorkist march avoided Henry's main army, they were repeatedly harassed by Tudor cavalry under Sir Edward Woodville. While Henry's army was outnumbered, they were far better equipped than the Yorkists, and Henry's two principal commanders, Jasper Tudor and John de Vere, 13th Earl of Oxford, were more experienced than any of the Yorkist leaders. The two armies met in battle at Stoke Field on 16 June 1487, and resulted in the destruction of the Yorkist force. The Earl of Lincoln was killed in the fighting, while the Viscount Lovell disappeared, likely to Scotland. Henry pardoned the young Simnel, likely recognising he was merely a puppet in the hands of adults, and put him to work in the royal kitchens as a spit-turner. Simnel later became a falconer, and died around 1534. Henry persuaded the Pope to excommunicate the Irish clergy who supported the revolt, and had Symonds imprisoned, but not executed. Stoke Field proved to be the last military engagement of the Wars of the Roses.

==== Warbeck's rebellion ====
In 1491, Perkin Warbeck, a young man hired in the service of a Breton merchant, was regarded favourably as an inheritor of the Yorkist claim to the throne by the pro-York citizens of Cork in Ireland, who allegedly decided to put Warbeck forth as an impostor Richard of Shrewsbury. Warbeck first claimed the throne at the Burgundian court in 1490, claiming to indeed be Richard, and that he had been spared due to his young age. He was publicly recognised as Richard by Margaret of York, sister of Edward IV, and was recognised as Richard IV of England at the funeral of the Holy Roman Emperor Frederick III, and had become recognised as the Duke of York in international diplomacy, despite Henry's protests. Some nobles in England were prepared to recognise Warbeck as Richard, including Sir Simon Montfort, Sir William Stanley, Sir Thomas Thwaites, and Sir Robert Clifford. Clifford, who visited Warbeck, wrote back to his allies in England confirming Warbeck's identity as the lost prince.

In January 1495, Henry crushed the conspiracy with six of the conspirators imprisoned and fined, while Montfort, Stanley, and several others were executed. Warbeck courted the Scottish royal court, where he was well received by James IV, who hoped to use Warbeck as leverage in international diplomacy. In September 1496, James invaded England with Warbeck, however the army was forced to withdraw when it expended its supplies, and support for Warbeck in the north failed to materialise. Having now fallen out of favour with James, Perkin sailed to Waterford. On 7 September 1497, Warbeck landed in Cornwall, hoping to capitalise on the Cornish people's resentment to Henry VII's unpopular taxes, which had induced them into revolt just three months earlier. Warbeck's presence triggered a second revolt; he was declared as Richard IV on Bodmin Moor, and his army of 6,000 Cornishmen advanced on Taunton. However, when Warbeck received word the king's troops were in the area, he panicked and deserted his army. Warbeck was captured, imprisoned, and on 23 November 1499, he was hanged.

That same year, Henry had the captive Edward Plantagenet, 17th Earl of Warwick, who had shared a cell with Warbeck and made an escape attempt together, executed. With Warwick's death, the direct male-line descent of the Plantagenet dynasty was rendered extinct.

== Impact ==
=== Immediate social effects ===
Some historians question the impact the wars had on the fabric of English society and culture; revisionists, such as the Oxford historian K. B. McFarlane, suggest that the effects of the conflict were greatly exaggerated. Many parts of England were largely unaffected by the wars, particularly East Anglia. In the densely populated regions of the country, both factions had far more to lose by the ruin of the country through protracted sieges and pillaging, and sought a quick resolution to the conflict through a pitched battle. The lengthy sieges that did occur, such as at Harlech and Bamburgh were in comparatively remote and sparsely populated areas. Contemporaries such as Philippe de Commines observed in 1470 that England was a unique case compared to wars that befell the continent, in that the consequences of war were only visited upon soldiers and nobles, not citizens and private property.

The instability caused by the Wars of the Roses allowed nobles to take advantage and promote their own position at the expense of others. This was because the 15th century witnessed the phenomenon of 'bastard feudalism' which involved the partial degradation of medieval feudalism. Rich landowners were able to possess private armies of retainers, accumulate wealth, and diminish the power of the Crown at a local level. Many areas undertook little effort to improve their defences; city walls were either left in prior ruinous states or only partially rebuilt, as was the case in London, whereby the citizenry was able to avoid devastation by persuading the Yorkist and Lancastrian troops to stay out, after the inability to reconstruct adequate walls, thereby rendering the city indefensible. "It is true that the wars were largely fought between nobles and their private armies, and they were also intermittent with fewer than 24 months of actual fighting over the entire period. Nevertheless, the local populace was sometimes dragged into the conflict, especially if nobles formed militia from their estate workers."

Among the lords, few noble houses were extinguished entirely by the wars; between 1425 and 1449, before the outbreak of fighting, there were as many extinctions of noble lines from natural causes (25), as occurred between 1450 and 1474 (24), during the heaviest period of combat. However, several preeminent noble families had their power crippled because of the fighting, such as the Neville family, while the direct male line of the Plantagenet dynasty was rendered extinct. Nevertheless, every subsequent monarch of England and its successor states has been a direct descendant of Edward III of England through three of his sons, but through the female line. The reign of the monarchy was broken briefly only by Cromwell's Commonwealth of England and The Protectorate.

Despite the relative paucity of violence undertaken against civilians, the wars claimed the lives of 105,000 people, approximately 5.5 per cent of the population in 1450. By 1490 England had experienced a 12.6 per cent increase in population compared to 1450, despite the wars.

=== Question of succession ===
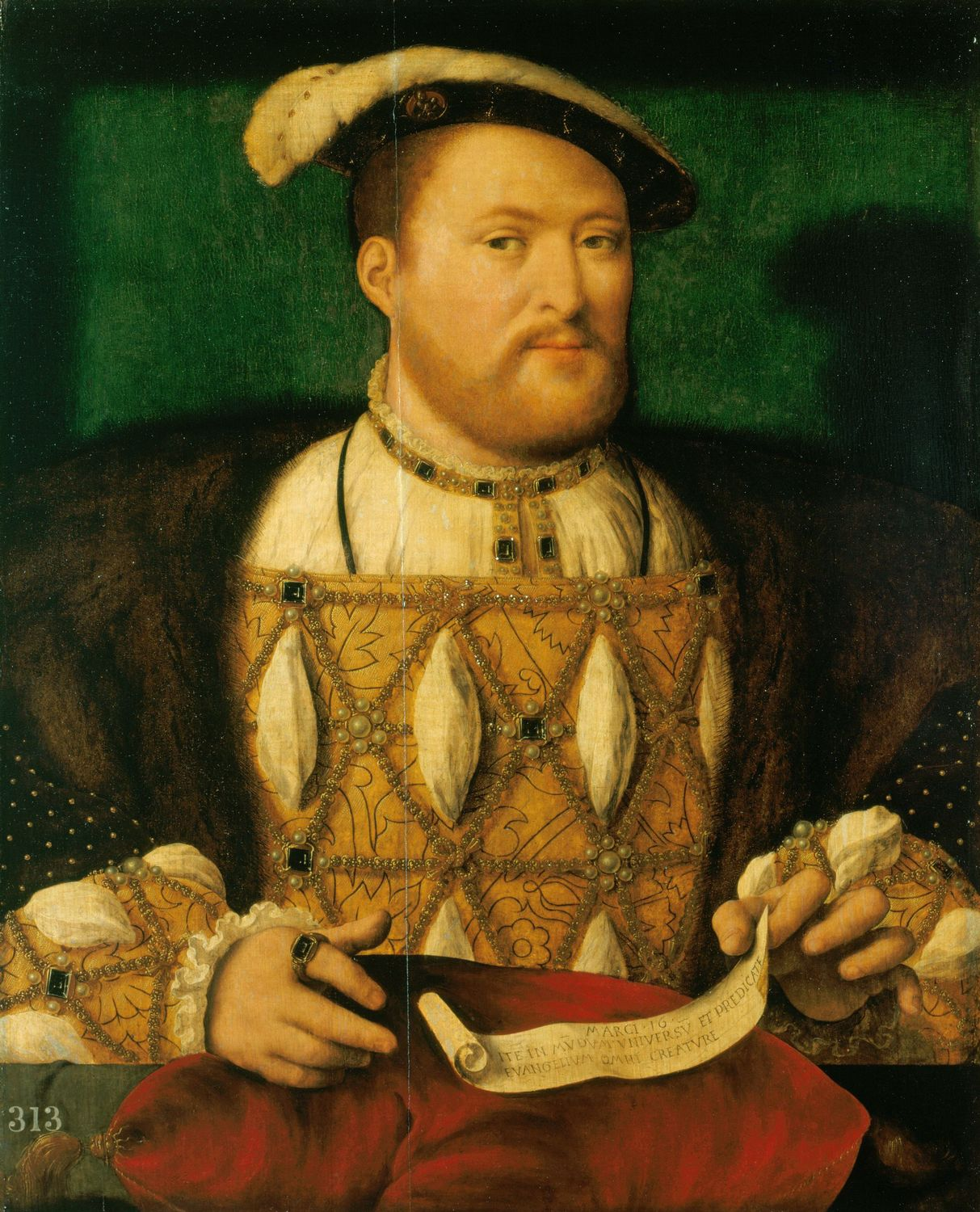
Henry VIII of England's anxiety over producing a male heir was driven by fears of a continuation of the Wars of the Roses

Although there would be no more serious military threat to Henry's rule or the Tudor claim to the throne that threatened a repeat of the Wars of the Roses, individuals also claiming descent from the Plantagenets continued to present challenges to the Tudor dynasty; when Henry VII ascended the throne, there were eighteen other Plantagenet descendants who may be considered to have a stronger claim to the throne, and by 1510 this number had increased by the birth of sixteen Yorkist children. However, Henry VIII, as the grandson and heir of the Yorkist king Edward IV, "had a superior Yorkist title to any conceivable rival". The De La Pole family continued to attempt to claim the throne; Edmund de la Pole, 3rd Duke of Suffolk, brother of the deceased Earl of Lincoln, was executed in 1513 by Henry VIII for this, while his brother Richard, known as the White Rose and who had conspired to invade England to claim the throne, was killed in battle at Pavia in 1525. Meanwhile, to maintain peace with Scotland, Henry VIII's sister, Margaret Tudor was married to James IV in 1503, a huge risk for England when attempting to claim the throne of Scotland, as it would mean Scotland, including France, would also claim the English throne, but, eventually, by the course of a century, the two Kingdoms of England and Scotland would have a joint monarch under the Scottish king, James VI and I.

=== Tudor dynasty ===
The English monarchy prior to the wars exerted only weak influence, unable to prevent the growing factional rivalries that undermined the political structure of the country. When Henry VII ascended the throne, he inherited a government that had been significantly weakened. Although the Tudor claim on the throne was weak and the new regime faced several rebellions, Henry's rule provided much-needed stability to the realm that prevented further outbreaks of war. Trade, commerce, and culture flourished and war would not return to England for 155 years. Upon his death, Henry VII had left to his successors a thriving economy, in part thanks to his frugal spending. Slavin (1964) considers Henry VII to be a member of the "New Monarchs", defined as a ruler who centralised power in the monarchy and unified their nation. Though the monarchy saw a strengthening under the Tudors, they generally operated within the established legal and financial boundaries, which compelled the monarch to cooperate closely with the nobility, rather than against them. Tudor monarchs, particularly Henry VIII, defined the concept of the "divine right of kings" to help reinforce monarchical authority, a philosophical concept which would come to plague England under the reign of Charles I, leading to the English Civil War.

The ascension of the Tudor dynasty saw the end of the dawn of the English Renaissance, an offshoot of the Italian Renaissance, that saw a revolution in art, literature, music, and architecture. The English Reformation, England's break with the Roman Catholic Church, occurred under the Tudors, which saw the establishment of the Anglican Church, and the rise of Protestantism as England's dominant religious denomination. Henry VIII's need for a male heir, impelled by the potential for a crisis of succession that dominated the Wars of the Roses, was the prime motivator influencing his decision to separate England from Rome. The reign of Henry VIII's daughter, Elizabeth I, is considered by historians to be a golden age in English history, and is widely remembered today as the Elizabethan era.

Historian John Guy argued that "England was economically healthier, more expansive, and more optimistic under the Tudors" than at any time since the Roman occupation. Historians such as Kendall, Walpole, and Buck contend that the characterisation of the Wars of the Roses as a period of bloodshed and lawlessness, contrasted with the Tudors ushering in a period of law, peace, and prosperity, served the political interests of the Tudors to present the new regime positively. Contemporaries of the Tudors, such as William Shakespeare and Sir Thomas More, wrote fictional and non-fictional works respectively which were hostile to Richard III. Horspool observes that More's work (which likely influenced Shakespeare) was a private endeavour published only after his death, as opposed to a state-sponsored commission, and M.M. Reese notes that More's work was "as much a protest against the harsh, competitive society of the early Tudors as against the supposed tyrannies of Richard III".

=== Present day ===
To this day, the Roses rivalry between Lancashire and Yorkshire has persisted including in culture and in sport when clubs from either county play each other.

== Armies and warfare ==
=== Strategy ===
Military strategy in the medieval period was predominated by siege warfare; fortifications provided a powerful bastion of defence for a regional populace to shelter from large-scale pillaging that characterised groups such as the Vikings or Mongols, and castles evolved as a central point of control and protection for local elites to exercise their authority over a given area. Fortifications also nullified the dominant weapon of the medieval battlefield: heavy cavalry. Pitched battles were generally rare compared to the Classical period due to a dramatic reduction in logistical capability, and those that were fought tended to be decisive encounters that risked the deaths of the leaders and the potential destruction of the army as a fighting force, discouraging them from taking place. The Wars of the Roses were anomalous in this regard; nobles had a great deal to lose by the ruin of the countryside in a protracted conflict, so they tended to deliberately seek pitched battles to resolve their grievances quickly and decisively.

=== Change in system of war ===
==== Decline of chivalry ====
The code of chivalry governed the actions of nobles in medieval warfare; in particular, nobles would often go to great lengths to take a fellow noble prisoner during combat in order to ransom them for a sum of money, rather than simply killing them. However, the concept of chivalry had been in decline for many years prior to the Wars of the Roses; for example, the battle at Crecy in 1346 (over a century prior) saw the cream of French nobility cut down by English archers, and the killing of many wounded French knights by common soldiers. The Wars of the Roses continued this trend; Edward IV was noted by contemporary Philippe de Commines as ordering his troops to spare common soldiers and kill the nobles. Ensuring the deaths of nobles in battle often led to one side wielding lopsided political control in the aftermath as a result, as occurred after Towton at which 42 captured knights were executed, and Barnet, which irrevocably broke the influence of the powerful Neville family. Nobles who escaped battle might be attainted, thereby being stripped of their lands and titles, and would therefore be of no value to a captor.

Knights during the Wars of the Roses typically valued money, land, and sabotaging other factions, even within or allied to the same house, they perceived as not supporting them enough.

==== Tactics, arms, and equipment ====
Much like during their campaigns in France, the English gentry fought on foot. Though heavy cavalry had been the dominant class of soldier on the medieval battlefield for centuries, the relative inexpensiveness to train and outfit an infantryman compared to an expensive mounted knight incentivised leaders for expanding their use, and the late medieval battlefield saw an increased use of infantry and light cavalry. In particular, English armies were characterised by their use of massed longbowmen, which often proved decisive in their encounters with French cavalry. However, as the English nobility fought on foot, and due to advances in fluted plate armour, neither side possessed a decisive tactical advantage from the use of these archers. An exception to this was at Towton, where the Yorkist archers took advantage of the high winds to extend their maximum range, dealing disproportionate damage to their Lancastrian opponents.

English armies of the time tended to favour a mix between infantry equipped with bills, poleaxes, flails, and other close range weaponry supported by massed longbowmen, a combination they would continue to use well into the Tudor period. Despite their frequent association with medieval warfare, swords were rare among the common soldiery and were instead favoured by men-at-arms or knights as a personal weapon indicating prestige and wealth. Other weapons commonly used by infantry and men-at-arms include axes, halberds, crossbows, and daggers. Hand cannons and arquebuses were used by both sides, however their numbers were limited. While cannons were used as early as 1346 at Crecy, these were crude ribauldequins firing metal arrows or grapeshot, and were rendered obsolete by bombards that came in the late 15th century. Bamburgh Castle, previously thought impregnable, was captured thanks to bombards in 1464. Cannons were used sparingly; Northampton was the first battle on English soil in which they were used. Early cannon were expensive to cast as they were often made from bronze, as such few commanders were willing to risk their capture on the field; at Barnet in 1471, the Yorkist artillery withheld their fire so as not to betray their location.

The invention of the blast furnace in Sweden in the mid-14th century increased and improved iron production, which led to advances in plate armour to protect soldiers from the powerful crossbows, longbows, and the advent of gunpowder weaponry, such as the hand cannon and the arquebus, that began to emerge around the same time. By the 15th century, plate armour had become cheaper than mail, although mail continued to be used to protect joints which could not be adequately protected by plate, such as the armpit, crook of the elbow, and groin. Contrary to the popular preconception of medieval armour as excessively heavy, a full suit of medieval armour in the 15th century seldom weighed more than 15 kg (33 lbs), substantially less than the loads that modern ground combat troops carry.

==== Recruitment ====
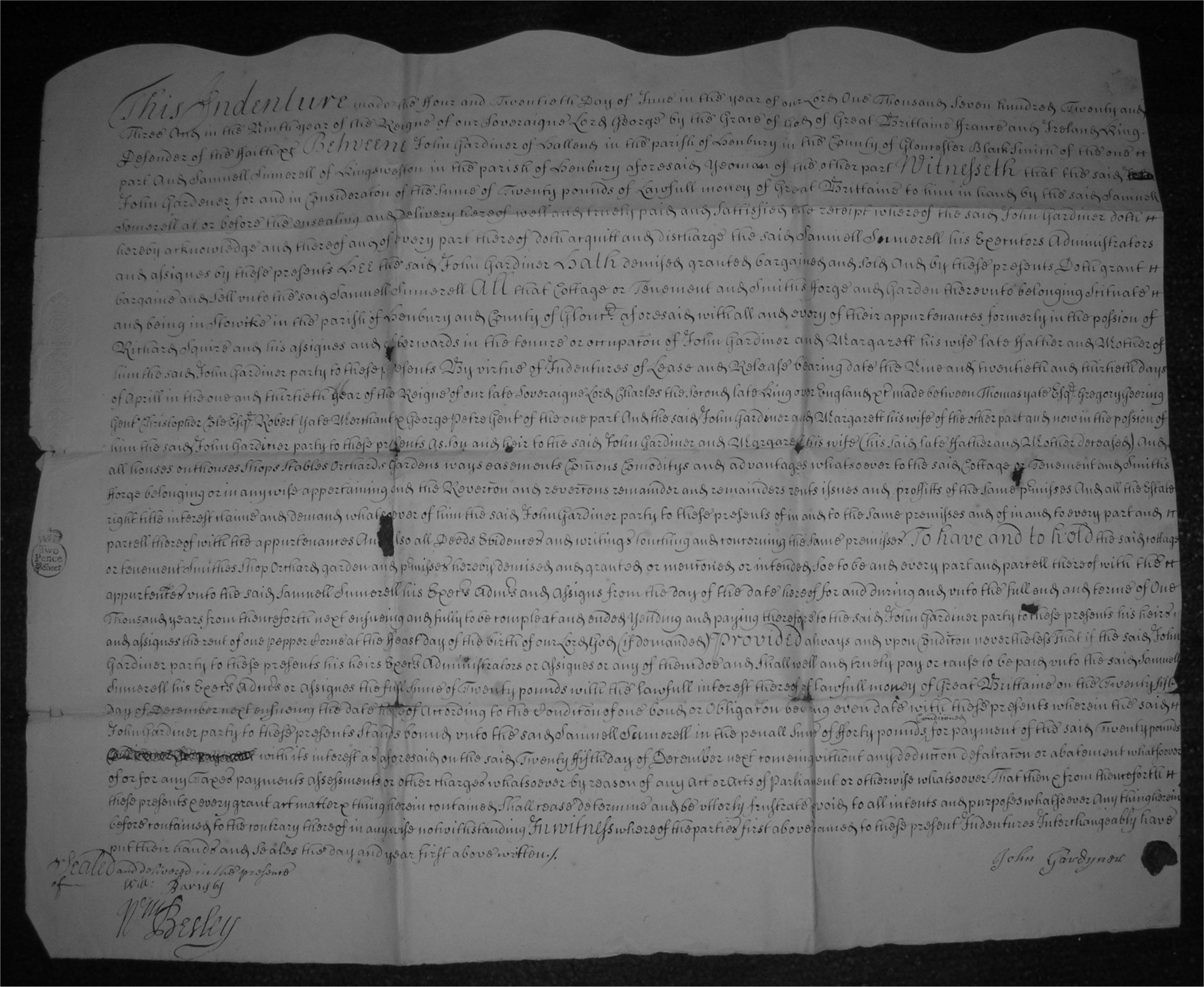
Half of an indenture contract, the randomly cut (or indented) edge at the top proves a match to the counterpart document

Following the climax of the Hundred Years' War, large numbers of experienced unemployed soldiers returned to England seeking work in the growing forces of the local nobility. England drifted towards misrule and violence as feuds between powerful families, such as the Percy-Neville feud, increasingly relied on their retainers to settle disputes. It became common practice for local landowners to bind their mesnie knights to their service with annual payments. Edward III had developed a contractual system whereby the monarch entered into agreements named indentures with experienced captains who were obliged to provide an agreed-upon number of men, at established rates, for a given period. Knights, men-at-arms, and archers were often sub-contracted. Skilled archers could often command wages as high as knights. The complex feudal structures that existed in England enabled nobles to raise large retinues, with armies large enough that could challenge the power of the crown.

== Leadership ==
As the wars were a series of sporadic battles fought across a period of over 32 years, many of the key commanders fluctuated due to death in battle, death by natural causes, executions, and possible assassinations. Some key commanders also defected between sides, such as Warwick the Kingmaker.

Yorkists are those who supported the rival House of York's claims to the throne, over the incumbent Lancastrian dynasty.

Lancastrians are those who supported the Lancastrian claim to the throne, principally by supporting the incumbent monarch, Henry VI.

Tudors are those who supported Henry VII's claim to the throne by right of conquest in 1485.

Yorkist rebels are Yorkists who, while not aligned with the claims of the Lancastrian dynasty, nevertheless rebelled against Edward IV during his reign.

Title	Name	Side	Notes
King of England	Edward IV of England	York	First reign: 4 March 1461 – 3 October 1470; Second reign: 11 April 1471 – 9 April 1483; Died of natural causes on 9 April 1483
King of England	Edward V of England	York	Reign: 9 April 1483 – 25 June 1483; Deposed by Richard III after a 78-day reign One of the Princes in the Tower
King of England	Richard III of England †	York	Reign: 26 June 1483 – 22 August 1485; Killed in battle at Bosworth Field on 22 August 1485, the last English king to die in battle
Queen consort of England	Elizabeth Woodville	York	Consort to Edward IV; Mother to Edward V and Elizabeth of York; Organised the alliance with Beaufort to promote Henry Tudor as a claimant to the throne
Dowager Queen	Elizabeth Woodville	Tudor	Consort to Edward IV; Mother to Edward V and Elizabeth of York; Organised the alliance with Beaufort to promote Henry Tudor as a claimant to the throne
Queen consort of England	Anne Neville	York	Consort to Richard III; Died of natural causes on 16 March 1485
Duke of York	Richard of York †	York	Also Lord Protector; Killed in battle at Wakefield on 30 December 1460
Earl of Rutland	Edmund Plantagenet †	York	Son of Richard of York; Killed in battle at Wakefield on 30 December 1460
Duke of Clarence	George Plantagenet (executed)	York	Briefly joined the Lancastrians; Son of Richard of York; Executed for treason at the Tower of London on 18 February 1478
Duke of Clarence	George Plantagenet (executed)	Lancaster	Briefly joined the Lancastrians; Son of Richard of York; Executed for treason at the Tower of London on 18 February 1478
Duke of Buckingham	Henry Stafford (executed)	York	Defected to the Tudor cause
Duke of Buckingham	Henry Stafford (executed)	Tudor	Grandson of Humphrey Stafford, 1st Duke of Buckingham; Executed after the failed Buckingham's Rebellion on 2 November 1483
Earl of Warwick	Richard Neville; Warwick The Kingmaker †	York	Defected from the Yorkist to the Lancastrian cause. Killed in battle at Barnet on 14 April 1471
Earl of Warwick	Richard Neville; Warwick The Kingmaker †	Lancaster	Defected from the Yorkist to the Lancastrian cause. Killed in battle at Barnet on 14 April 1471
Earl of Salisbury	Richard Neville (executed)	York	Father of Warwick the Kingmaker; Executed after the Battle of Wakefield by Lancastrians on 31 December 1460
Earl of Kent	William Neville	York	Uncle of Warwick the Kingmaker; Died of natural causes on 9 January 1463
Viscount Fauconberg	Thomas Neville	York	Son of William Neville, Earl of Kent; Defected from the Yorkists to the Lancastrians; Executed at Middleham Castle on 22 September 1471
Viscount Fauconberg	Thomas Neville	Lancaster	Son of William Neville, Earl of Kent; Defected from the Yorkists to the Lancastrians; Executed at Middleham Castle on 22 September 1471
Marquess of Montagu	John Neville †	York	Younger brother of Warwick the Kingmaker; Defected from the Yorkist to the Lancastrian cause Killed in battle at Barnet on 14 April 1471
Marquess of Montagu	John Neville †	Lancaster	Younger brother of Warwick the Kingmaker; Defected from the Yorkist to the Lancastrian cause Killed in battle at Barnet on 14 April 1471
Baron Neville	John Neville	Lancaster	Briefly defected from the Lancastrians to the Yorkists; Killed in battle at Ferrybridge on 28 March 1461
Baron Neville	John Neville	York	Briefly defected from the Lancastrians to the Yorkists; Killed in battle at Ferrybridge on 28 March 1461
Knight of the Realm	Thomas Neville †	York	Younger brother of Warwick the Kingmaker; Killed in battle at Wakefield on 30 December 1460
Duke of Norfolk	John de Mowbray	York	Died of natural causes on 6 November 1461
Duke of Norfolk	John Howard †	York	Killed in battle at Bosworth Field on 22 August 1485
Earl of Lincoln	John de la Pole †	York	Killed in battle at Stoke Field on 16 June 1487
Viscount Lovell	Francis Lovell	York	Disappeared after the Battle of Bosworth Field on 22 August 1485
Earl of Pembroke	William Herbert (executed)	York	Executed after the Battle of Edgcote on 27 July 1469
Earl of Devon	Humphrey Stafford (executed)	York	Executed after the Battle of Edgcote on 27 July 1469
Earl of Desmond	Thomas FitzGerald X	York	Commanded Yorkist forces in Ireland; Assassinated in Drogheda in 1468
Baron Hastings	William Hastings (executed)	York	Executed at the Tower of London on 20 June 1483
King of England	Henry VI of England (surrendered)	Lancaster	First reign: 1 September 1422 – 4 March 1461; Second reign: 3 October 1470 – 11 April 1471; Captured and imprisoned by the Yorkists; Died in unclear circumstances on 21 May 1471
Prince of Wales	Edward of Westminster †	Lancaster	Son of Henry VI and Margaret of Anjou; Killed in battle at Tewkesbury on 4 May 1471
Queen consort of England	Margaret of Anjou (surrendered)	Lancaster	Wife of Henry VI; Died of natural causes on 25 August 1482
Duke of Somerset	Edmund Beaufort †	Lancaster	Killed in battle at St Albans on 22 May 1455
Duke of Somerset	Henry Beaufort (executed)	Lancaster	Son of Edmund Beaufort, 2nd Duke of Somerset; Executed after the Battle of Hexham on 15 May 1464
Duke of Somerset	Edmund Beaufort (executed)	Lancaster	Younger brother of Henry Beaufort, 3rd Duke of Somerset; Executed after the Battle of Tewkesbury on 6 May 1471
Earl of Northumberland	Henry Percy †	Lancaster	Killed in battle at Towton on 29 March 1461
Earl of Northumberland	Henry Percy	Lancaster	Son of Henry Percy, 3rd Earl of Northumberland
Duke of Buckingham	Humphrey Stafford †	Lancaster	Killed in battle at Northampton on 10 July 1460
Earl of Shrewsbury	John Talbot †	Lancaster	Killed in battle at Northampton on 10 July 1460
Duke of Exeter	Henry Holland	Lancaster	Died of natural causes in September 1475
Earl of Wiltshire	James Butler (executed)	Lancaster	Executed after the Battle of Towton on 1 May 1461
Earl of Devon	John Courtenay †	Lancaster	Killed in battle at Tewkesbury on 4 May 1471
Earl of Oxford	John de Vere	Lancaster	Later supported the Tudor claim to the throne under Henry VII
Earl of Oxford	John de Vere	Tudor	Later supported the Tudor claim to the throne under Henry VII
Earl of Ormond	John Butler	Lancaster	Commanded Lancastrian forces in Ireland; Died in the Holy Land of natural causes on 14 December 1476
Viscount Beaumont	John Beaumont †	Lancaster	Killed in battle at Northampton on 10 July 1460
Baron Audley	James Tuchet †	Lancaster	Killed in battle at Blore Heath on 23 September 1459
Baron Clifford	John Clifford †	Lancaster	Killed in battle at Ferrybridge on 28 March 1461
Baron Ros	Thomas de Ros (executed)	Lancaster	Executed after the Battle of Hexham on 17 May 1464
Knight of the Realm	Andrew Trollope †	Lancaster	Killed in battle at Towton on 29 March 1461
Knight of the Realm	Owen Tudor (executed)	Lancaster	Grandfather of Henry VII; Father of Edmund Tudor and Jasper Tudor; Executed shortly after the Battle of Mortimer's Cross at Hereford on 2 February 1461
Earl of Richmond	Edmund Tudor (surrendered)	Lancaster	Father of Henry VII; Died of bubonic plague on 3 November 1456 while imprisoned at Carmarthen Castle
Earl of Pembroke	Jasper Tudor	Lancaster	Uncle of Henry VII
Earl of Pembroke	Jasper Tudor	Tudor	Uncle of Henry VII
King of England	Henry VII of England	Tudor	Reign: 22 August 1485 – 21 April 1509; Inherited the Lancastrian claim Defeated the Yorkists at Bosworth Field
Countess of Richmond	Lady Margaret Beaufort	Tudor	Mother of Henry VII; Orchestrated the rise of the Tudor dynasty
Earl of Shrewsbury	George Talbot	Tudor	—
Baron Stanley	Thomas Stanley	Tudor	Supported Henry VII late at the Battle of Bosworth Field
Baron Strange	George Stanley	Tudor	Son and heir apparent of Thomas Stanley
Knight of the Realm	William Stanley	Tudor	Younger brother of Thomas Stanley; Supported Henry VII late at the Battle of Bosworth Field
Baron Scales	Edward Woodville	Tudor	—
Baron Willoughby de Eresby	Robert Welles (executed)	Yorkist rebel	Executed following the Battle of Losecoat Field on 19 March 1470
Knight of the Realm	Robin of Redesdale †	Yorkist rebel	Reportedly killed in battle at Edgcote on 24 July 1469

== Family tree ==
English royal families in the Wars of the Roses

Dukes (except Aquitaine) and Princes of Wales are noted, as are the monarchs' reigns.
†=Killed in action; =Executed
See also Family tree of English monarchs

Henry of Grosmont; Duke of Lancaster	Edward III; King of England r. 1327–1377
Edward of Woodstock "The Black Prince"; Prince of Wales	Thomas of Woodstock; Duke of Gloucester	Blanche of Lancaster	John of Gaunt; Duke of Lancaster	Katherine Swynford	Edmund of Langley; Duke of York	Lionel of Antwerp; Duke of Clarence
Edward of Angoulême	Richard II; Prince of Wales, King of England r. 1377–1399	Henry IV; Duke of Lancaster, King of England r. 1399–1413	John Beaufort	Thomas Beaufort; Duke of Exeter	Joan Beaufort	Ralph Neville	Philippa of Clarence
Owen Tudor; Lancastrian	Catherine of Valois	Henry V Duke of Lancaster, Prince of Wales, King of England r. 1413–1422	Humphrey; Duke of Gloucester	Henry Percy "Hotspur"	Elizabeth Mortimer	Roger Mortimer
Edward of Norwich; Duke of York	Richard of Conisburgh	Anne de Mortimer
John Beaufort; Duke of Somerset; Lancastrian	Margaret of Anjou; Lancastrian	Henry VI; King of England r. 1422–1461, r. 1470–1471; Lancastrian	Edmund Beaufort; Duke of Somerset; Lancastrian †1st St Albans	William Neville; Yorkist	Anne Neville	Henry Percy; Lancastrian †1st St Albans	Eleanor Neville	Richard Neville; Yorkist; (executed) Wakefield	Cecily Neville	Richard of York; Duke of York, Prince of Wales; Yorkist †Wakefield
Henry Beaufort; Duke of Somerset; Lancastrian; (executed) Hexham	Richard Woodville; (executed) Edgecote	Edmund Beaufort; Duke of Somerset; Lancastrian; (executed) Tewkesbury	Margaret Beaufort	Humphrey Stafford	Henry Percy; Lancastrian †Towton	John Neville; Yorkist, then Lancastrian †Barnet	Richard Neville "Kingmaker"; Yorkist, then Lancastrian †Barnet
Margaret Beaufort; Lancastrian	Edmund Tudor; Lancastrian	Jasper Tudor; Duke of Bedford; Lancastrian	Catherine Woodville	Henry Stafford; Duke of Buckingham; Yorkist, then Lancastrian (executed)	Elizabeth Woodville	Edward IV; Duke of York, King of England r. 1461–1470, r. 1471–1483; Yorkist	George Plantagenet; Duke of Clarence; Yorkist, then Lancastrian; (executed) Tower	Edward of Westminster; Prince of Wales; Lancastrian †Tewkesbury	Anne Neville	Richard III; Duke of Gloucester, King of England r. 1483–1485; Yorkist †Bosworth Field
Henry VII; King of England; Lancastrian r. 1485–1509	Elizabeth of York	Edward V Prince of Wales, King of England r. 1483; Yorkist; (executed) Tower	Richard of Shrewsbury; Duke of York; (executed) Tower

== In literature ==
Chronicles written during the Wars of the Roses include:

- Benet's Chronicle
- Gregory's Chronicle (1189–1469)
- Short English Chronicle (before 1465)
- Hardyng's Chronicle: first version for Henry VI (1457)
- Hardyng's Chronicle: second version for Richard, duke of York and Edward IV (1460 and c. 1464)
- Hardyng's Chronicle: second "Yorkist" version revised for Lancastrians during Henry VI's Readeption (see Peverley's article).
- Capgrave (1464)
- Commynes (1464–98)
- Chronicle of the Lincolnshire Rebellion (1470)
- Historie of the arrival of Edward IV in England (1471)
- Waurin (before 1471)
- An English Chronicle: AKA Davies' Chronicle (1461)
- Brief Latin Chronicle (1422–71)
- Fabyan (before 1485)
- Rous (1480/86)
- Croyland Chronicle (1449–1486)
- Warkworth's Chronicle (1500?)

== See also ==
- Roses rivalry
- Hundred Years' War
- War of the League of Cambrai
- List of English civil wars
