= Thomas Neville (died 1460) =

Second son of Richard Neville, 5th Earl of Salisbury

Sir Thomas Neville
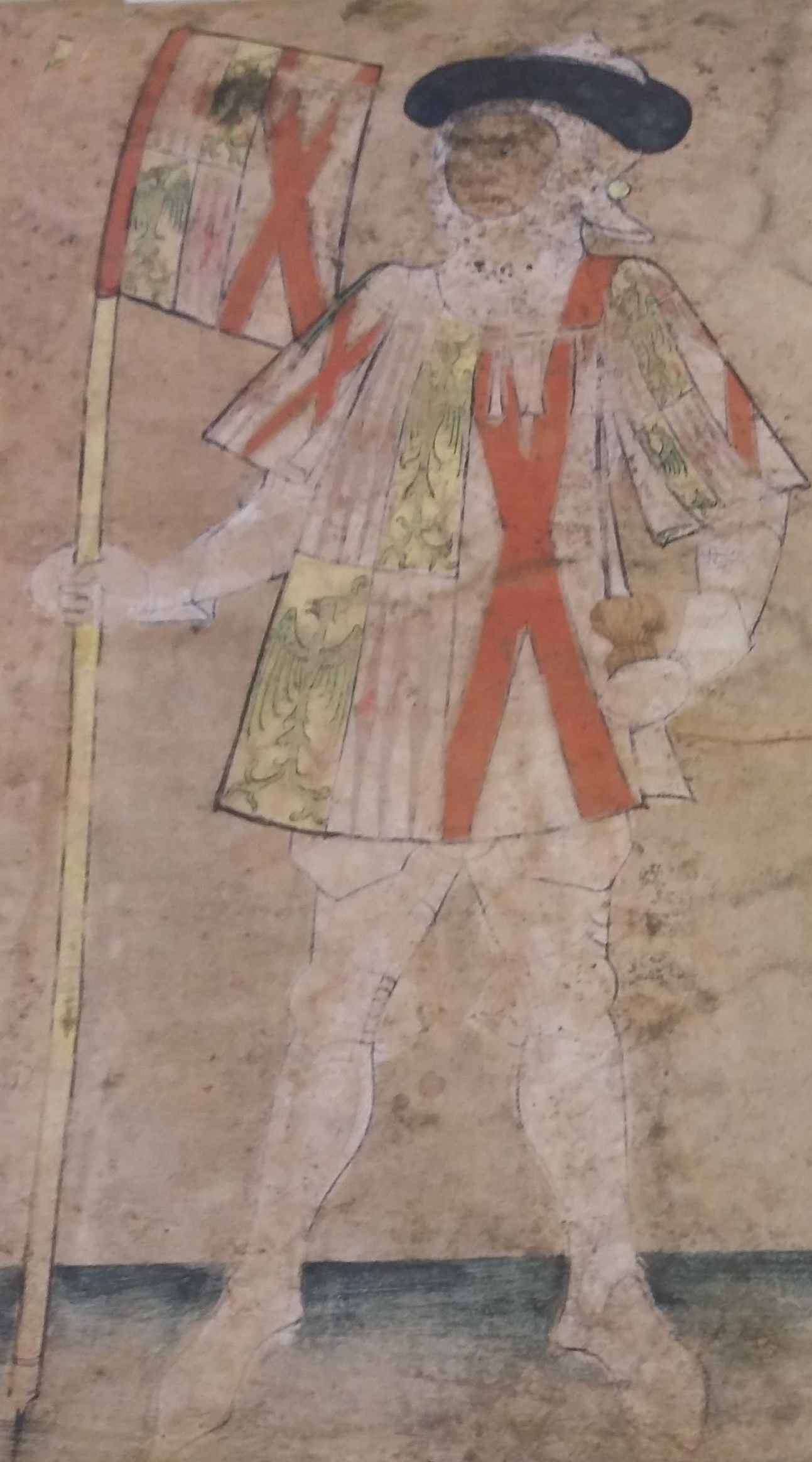
- Thomas Neville as depicted in the contemporaneous 'Salisbury Roll of Arms' illuminated manuscript.
- Born: c. 1429
- Died: 30 December 1460 (aged c. 31); Sandal Magna, Yorkshire, England
- Buried: Bisham Abbey, Berkshire
- Family: Neville
- Spouses: Maud Stanhope (1453–1460, widowed)
- Father: Richard Neville, 5th Earl of Salisbury
- Mother: Alice Montagu, 5th Countess of Salisbury

Sir Thomas Neville (c. 1429 – 1460) was a medieval English politician and soldier. The second son of Richard Neville, 5th Earl of Salisbury, a major nobleman and magnate in the north of England, Sir Thomas played an active role in the violent disorder that wracked the north during the 1450s. He also took his father's side in the early years of the Wars of the Roses. Thomas was a younger brother of the more famous Richard Neville, Earl of Warwick, the 'Kingmaker'.

Thomas worked closely with them both in administering the region for the Crown and became a leading player in the turbulent regional politics of northern England in the early 1450s, especially in the Neville family's growing local rivalry with the House of Percy. In the armed feud between both houses, which broke out in 1453 and lasted two years, Thomas and his brother John launched a series of raids, ambushes and skirmishes across Yorkshire against the Percy family. Historians describe the feud as setting the stage for the Wars of the Roses, the dynastic struggle between the houses of Lancaster and York for the English throne, and Thomas played a large role in the Neville family's alliance with his uncle, Richard, Duke of York.

Thomas took part in his father's battles, being present at the Battle of Blore Heath in September 1459, where he was captured with his younger brother John by the Lancastrians. As a result, he was imprisoned and later attainted along with his father, brothers, and the Yorkists at the 1459 Parliament of Devils. Being imprisoned, he did not share Salisbury's and Warwick's exile in Calais. On their return the following year, he was released when Warwick and the future Edward IV together won the Battle of Northampton. When the Duke of York also returned from his exile and claimed the throne from Henry VI, it appears that it was Thomas who was personally responsible for informing the Duke of the Nevilles' collective disapproval of his plans.

Thomas joined his father Salisbury's and York's army, and travelled to Yorkshire in December 1460 with the purpose of suppressing Lancastrian-inspired disorder. There he fought in the disastrous Battle of Wakefield, where the Yorkists went down to a crushing defeat. Thomas was killed in the fighting, and his head, alongside those of his father and uncle, was impaled above one of the gates of the city of York.

== Early career, knighthood and marriage ==
Thomas Neville was the second son of Richard Neville and his wife Alice Montagu, 5th Countess of Salisbury. He was probably born soon after his elder brother Richard in 1428, and certainly before 1432, by when his parents had had two more sons, John and George. Richard was to become Earl of Warwick, and, as one of the most important politicians in the kingdom, earned himself the soubriquet "Kingmaker"; John became Marquess of Montagu and defender of the North; George, the youngest, had a career in the Church, becoming Archbishop of York. The historian Michael Hicks suggests that seeing how closely the brothers cooperated as adults, they were probably close as children.

In 1439, Maud, Countess of Cambridge, reported Thomas to the royal council for attacking her house in Danby, near Eskdale, along with Sir Thomas Lumley. Maud complained that they and their men had hunted and shot deer in her park, but she was unable to do anything herself because the Nevilles and Lumleys were both powerful local families. (Note: Maud's petition to the council exists and is held at The National Archives in Kew, classified under reference E28/63/31.) Six years later, he was appointed joint steward of the Lancastrian Honour of Pontefract with his father and John. His first independent mention in government records came in 1448 when he was made steward of the Bishopric of Durham by his uncle, Robert, the Bishop. For this, he received wages of £20 per annum from diocesan revenues. His father appointed him his Steward of Bolton in 1450, and he became Sheriff of Glamorgan the same year, in which capacity he witnessed a charter of Warwick's on 12 March 1451. Warwick also appointed him to assist in the management of his Warwickshire estates, for which Thomas received an annuity. Alongside the King's two half-brothers, Edmund and Jasper Tudor, he was knighted by King Henry VI on 5 January 1453. With increasing tension between the Percys and Nevilles in the north, relations between the latter and the crown had come under strain, and his knighting may have been an attempt to ameliorate this.

The king licensed Thomas Neville on 1 May 1453 to marry Maud Stanhope, (Note: Also called Matilda: The given name Matilda was brought to England with the Norman Invasion of 1066, and became the version commonly used in official records; Maud remained the medieval vernacular.) the widow of Robert, Lord Willoughby and a wealthy heiress. She was also the niece and joint-heiress of Ralph, Lord Cromwell, one of the richest men in the kingdom, (Note: By 1452, apart from the King, only the Dukes of York and Buckingham, and the Neville earls were richer than him.) Cromwell was involved in feuds with two powerful men at this time; Friedrichs suggests that, while a man such as Cromwell could always expect to attract his share of enemies, previously he had been able to confront them in courts of law, mostly successfully. She continues though that "the political enemies he acquired in his later years ... proved to be a very different story". In 1449, Sir William Tailboys violently assaulted Cromwell outside the Star Chamber in Westminster Palace in an attempted kidnapping, while three years later ("another and more powerful enemy") Henry Holland, Duke of Exeter disputed Cromwell's rights to Ampthill Manor and seized it by force. Exeter also engineered the dismissal of Cromwell from the royal council with accusations of treason.

Cromwell saw connecting his family to the Nevilles as a way of counterbalancing his enemies. (Note: He continued this policy with the marriage he arranged for his other niece Joan, who wed Humphrey Bourchier, nephew of Richard Duke of York.) The marriage cost him the massive sum of nearly £2,000 (Note: To put this figure in context, Salisbury's annual income has been estimated at £3,000 per annum.) in loans to Salisbury: "the price the Nevilles could extract was a measure of Cromwell's desperation", argues the medievalist Rhoda Friedrichs. This money was divided between the earl, Thomas and his brothers. The marriage was designed by Salisbury to provide Thomas with an estate "of genuinely comital proportions", says Hicks. (Note: The minimum annual income expected of an earl at this time was £666 13s 4d, equivalent to 1,000 marks.) As a marriage settlement from the Earl and Countess of Salisbury in Easter 1454, Thomas and Maud received two-thirds of the Yorkshire manors of Catterick, Danby Wiske and Aldborough. He and Maud shared similar literary interests. Friedrichs has suggested that his "political and military adventures had included his wife, even to the point of battle", and he is known to have owned an early copy of Chaucer's Canterbury Tales. They both inscribed as marginalia, "T. Nevyll" and "Mawd Wyllwghby". (Note: Original manuscript held at the British Library as MS Harley Sloane 1685. Chaucer was Thomas Neville's great-grandmother's brother-in-law.)

The historian Ralph A. Griffiths has suggested that the announcement of Thomas's marriage was the immediate cause of the feud with the Percys. Not only, says Griffiths, was any further Neville aggrandisement an anathema to the Percys, but the new Cromwell connection gave the Nevilles access to the ex-Percy manors of Wressle and Burwell. These had been granted to Cromwell in 1440 but the Percys still hoped to reclaim then. (Note: As indeed they did in 1458.)

== Feud with the Percy family ==
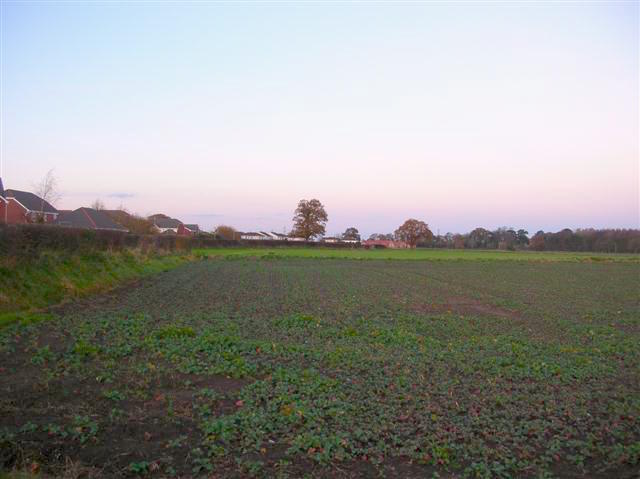
The site of the Battle of Stamford Bridge

The Nevilles were one of four major landowners in the north, along with Richard, 3rd Duke of York, the Crown (as Duke of Lancaster), and the Percy family, who were the earls of Northumberland. York and the King, however, were effectively absentee landlords; the two main families were the Nevilles and Percys. Although the families had cooperated in defence of the border with Scotland for 30 years, relations were often tense. The medievalist Bertie Wilkinson has described the environment of the period. Not only was it "seriously divided" politically, but "the area was remote, exposed to Scottish attack, and impossible to control, at least by the government of Henry VI".

By 1453, tension had turned to violence. It was not the two earls, as heads of their families, who were the cause, but their younger sons, who were responsible for its escalation. To what extent Salisbury may have been directing affairs from afar is unknown, but the historian A. J. Pollard has argued that Thomas was his father's "direct representative" in the struggle. Friedrichs has called Thomas "combatative [sic] and landless", while the historian Simon Payling believes him to have been "vigorous and youthful". Thomas's opponent Thomas Percy, Lord Egremont was similarly described by R. L. Storey as "quarrelsome, violent and contemptuous of all authority" and by Pollard as "wild and belligerent". With his younger brother Sir Richard Percy and their retainers, they launched an opening assault on the Nevilles on 24 August 1453. They were returning to Yorkshire with Thomas's new bride after the wedding at Cromwell's Tattershall Castle, Lincolnshire. The Nevilles were ambushed at Heworth, York by a Percy force of possibly 5,000 men. This—effectively an assassination attempt—was the most violent incident between the families for many years. Although the respective sizes of the opposing forces are unknown, the Nevilles would have had a substantial retinue with them. This encounter was the first in a series of skirmishes, assaults and numerous destructive episodes "of breaking and entering", which saw Thomas "in the thick of the fighting".

William Worcester's description of Heworth 1453
Et post nuptias in redeundo facta est maxima divisio inter Thomam Percy, dominum de Egremond, et dictum comitem, prope Eboracum. Initium fuit maximorum dolorum in Anglia.	After the wedding when returning home there was a very great division between Thomas Percy, Lord Egremont, and the said earl [of Salisbury] near York. The beginning of the greatest sorrows in England.

In response, he and his brother John began actively seeking out Percy retainers and their property. They inflicted severe damage to the estates of Sir William Plumpton, a Percy loyalist, in Knaresborough as part of an aggressive Neville demonstration of power in January 1454. With his brothers, John and Richard, as well as Salisbury, they faced the Earl of Northumberland and his sons at Topcliffe, North Yorkshire on 20 October 1453, although a negotiated peace averted battle. The Crown tried to settle the feud, but Griffiths has described its response as "futile". Rather than take decisive action, it relied on writing letters to both the earls and their younger sons, regardless of how willing—or able—the former were to control the latter. In the event, the feud continued for much of the next year with further violent encounters and only came to a halt with another battle at Salisbury's manor of Stamford Bridge, near York on 31 October 1454. Thomas and John confronted and decisively beat Egremont and Richard Percy, Thomas capturing the latter as they attempted to escape.

== Later career ==
=== Death of Cromwell ===
Maud's mother, Margaret had died in September 1454. Thomas's uncle-in-law, Lord Cromwell, had written his first will in 1451, but, probably unknown to his nieces or their husbands, he had re-written it three years later. The first will was extremely favourable to Maud; the second not nearly so, leaving them only 500 marks each and limited manors. (Note: The bulk of his estate was redirected towards funding his foundation of Tattershall College.) Cromwell died on 4 January 1457, "richer than Fastolf and with even more claims against his estate". It is unknown where Thomas was at the time, but he attended Cromwell's funeral. The complexity of Cromwell's affairs led to many legal machinations, and as husband to one of his only heirs, Thomas was extensively involved in negotiations. Cromwell had already made a will in 1451, which was mostly concerned with bequests for servants and several charitable institutions. The main difference between that and the superseding will in 1454 was that—while they appeared superficially similar—the second will directed that the executors have discretion as to what institutions precisely benefitted. Friedrichs sums up the main provisions of the second will:

Instead of vestments to a few churches and alms to poor tenants, Cromwell commanded that all his lands which were not entailed were to be sold to the highest bidder and the money given to any charity the executors chose. Of all his holdings only the entailed lands were to go to the heirs.

She also argues that husband and wife "expected more and clearly felt justly entitled to more". She suggests that Thomas−following the "assumption that possession was nine-tenths of the law"—deliberately filed the 1451 will for probate. While the later will was known about, it was possible that if the earlier will could be proved first, it would be harder for the manors gained from it to be legally repossessed, regardless of the later will. He also took paralegal action and took physical possession, backed by arms, of all he could. He and his fellow heir jure uxoris, Humphrey Bourchier, illegally expelled Cromwell's feoffees from several manors in Nottinghamshire and Derbyshire in December 1457, and Thomas was still holding 35 manors—taken "by strong hand"—in September 1459.

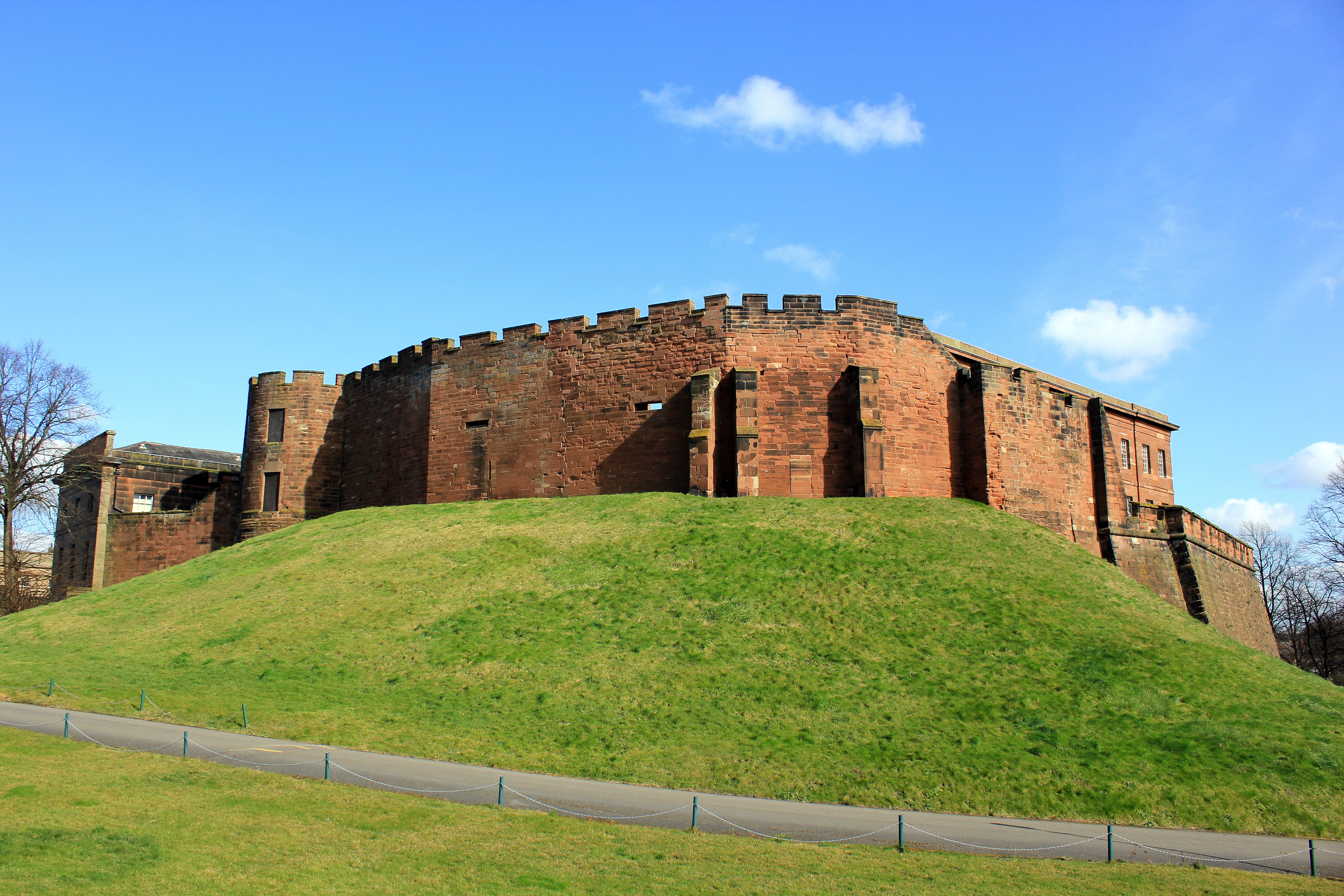
Chester Castle, where Thomas Neville was imprisoned between September 1459 and July 1460

Cromwell's executors later claimed that over £2,000 worth of goods, cash and food had been stolen from Tattershall on the day of the funeral. (Note: There was a general orgy of plunder and pillage on Cromwell's death, not the least by his own servants, who in South Wingfield—one of Cromwell's most "sumptuous" manors—were alleged by the executors to have carried off over £800 worth of goods while Cromwell was still in his deathbed, while in Norfolk, Thomas, Lord Scales drove away 1,000 of his sheep.) There seems to have been an expectation by contemporaries that Thomas would receive the support of his father in pursuing his case. John Fastolf, for example, writing to John Paston the day after Cromwell died (Note: 5 January 34 Henry VI, or 5 February 1456. Alexander Ramsay, in his 1857 reissue of Fenn's collection, reprints the same letter but erroneously gives the date as 1454. This is, of course, impossible.), told him that "Master Neville, the which hath wedded my Lady have power or interest to receive the Lord of Willoughby's debts, then he to be laboured unto. And my Lord of Salisbury will be a great helper in this cause." Resolving the legal issues was a slow process. The couple did not receive a substantial portion of her inheritance until the next year when they gained lands worth around £1,000 yearly and an option on others worth £200 at purchase. The bulk of her inheritance comprised Cromwell's entitled estate, the core of his wealth, and would have brought them vast wealth under the 1451 will. Its later iteration, however, greatly reduced the amount of land available to his heirs. Although they legally challenged the second will, they were unsuccessful in breaking it, and seem to have been reduced to arguing over goods and chattels, such as drapes and bedding that Maud claimed she had been promised. Legal disputation over the will continued until the 1470s. Ultimately, commented Friedrichs, Thomas was never able to create a major political powerbase from Cromwell's wealth.

== Final years ==
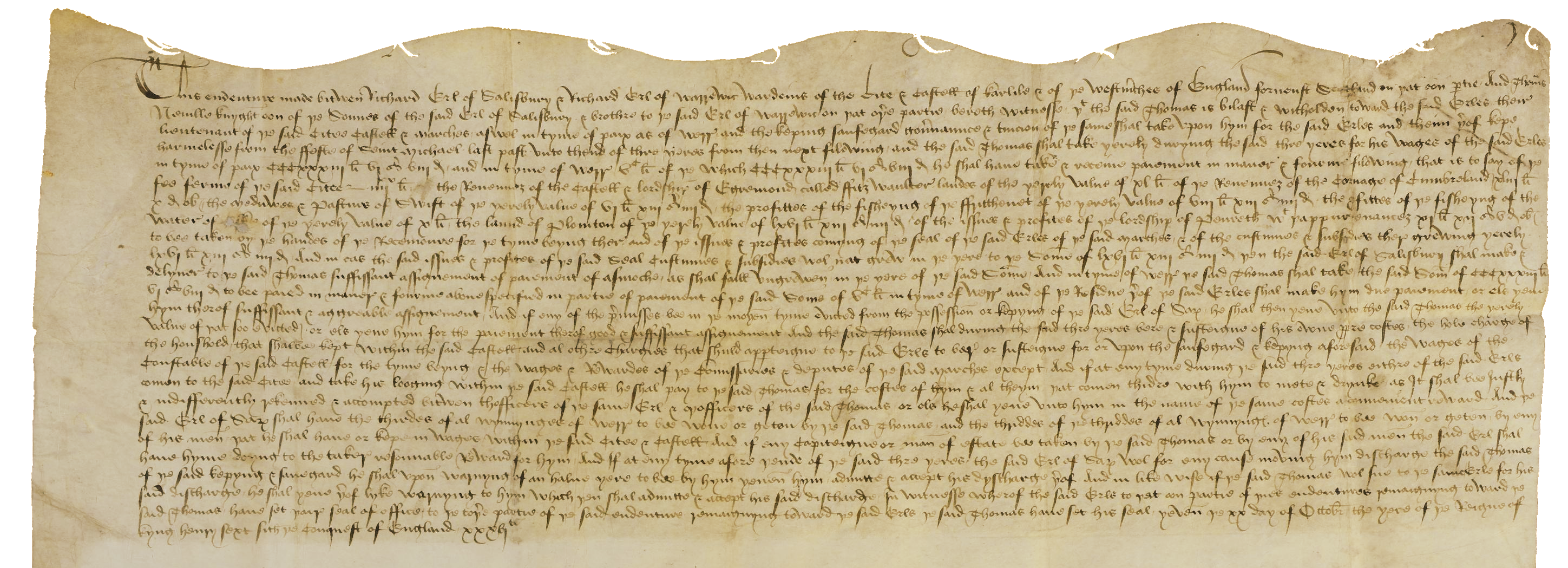
Portion of the tripartite indenture signed between Salisbury and Warwick and Sir Thomas appointing the latter their lieutenant in the West March. Dated "the xx day of Octobr[e] the yere of the Reigne of kyng Henry sext sith the conquest of England xxxvi" (20 October 1459), it opens, This indenture made bitwen Richard Earl of Salisbury & Richard Erl of Warrewic wardens of the cite & castell of Carlisle & of the West m[ar]ches of England foruenst Scotland on that oon p[ar]tie And Thom[a]s Neville knyght oon of the Sonnes of the said Erl of Salisbury & brother to the said Erl of Warrewic on that oth[er]e partie bereth winesse th[a]t the said Thomas is bilast and witholden toward the said Erles their leutenant of the said citee castell & marches aswel in tyme of paix as of warr. (Note: Currently held at The National Archives, classification TNA E 327/183.)

Government offices kept coming Thomas's way, and in 1457, he was appointed Chamberlain of the Exchequer, along with his fellow Cromwell co-heir, Bourchier. Later that year, his father and brother assigned Thomas their deputy—"lieutenant of the said city, castle and marches, as well in time of peace as of war"—on the West March towards Scotland, where they were joint Wardens. For this, he received a salary of 500 marks or £333 6s 8d, to be collected from the revenues of Penrith Castle; Salisbury, though was to have a third of all ransoms taken in the event that war broke out. Although R. L. Storey suggests that this was "less than a quarter" of Salisbury's and Warwick's official salary, more recently, Henry Summerson has argued that the wardenship was probably "a source of particular profit", at least in times of peace. (Note: Summerson notes, however, that with a man-at-arms costing 12d a day and 6d for an archer, Thomas could not have afforded the necessarily large garrison for any substantial length of time.) A few months later, he stood as surety for his uncle William, Lord Fauconberg's good behaviour (who Hicks speculates may have been involved in piracy at this time).

The year following the Nevilles' defeat of the Percys saw national politics become increasingly divided and factional. The King had been incapacitated since August 1453, (Note: Historians have speculated upon Henry's illness. Its precise nature is unknown, but Griffiths describes it as "a severe mental collapse, accompanied by a crippling physical disablement". His illness may also have had a genetic element, as Henry's grandfather, Charles VI of France, had suffered extreme bouts of insanity in his later years.) but in April the Chancellor, John Kemp died. This bought matters to a head. Only the king could appoint a new chancellor, so a new head of government was required until Henry's recovery. The lords chose Richard, Duke of York as Lord Protector, who in turn chose Salisbury as his new chancellor. However, these arrangements only lasted a year, for the king appeared to have recovered by February 1455. He immediately undid York's appointments. York and Salisbury retired to their far-flung estates. They wrote to Henry regarding their fear of political enemies, emphasising their loyalty to him. This was in spite of what they called the "doubtes and ambiguitees [and] jealousie" spread by their enemies. Henry and the Royal household left London in April 1455, and meanwhile, York and Salisbury marched south with a small army; they confronted and defeated the King at the Battle of St Albans in May.

Although Thomas's feud with the Percy sons was not directly connected to the battle, it was considered part of the general disorder. So, as part of the king's attempt to reconcile his divided nobility three years later, Salisbury entered into a bond for Thomas's good behaviour on 23 March 1458. Conversely, a few months later, the Earl of Shrewsbury was instructed to arrest around 30 men in Nottinghamshire until they could provide sureties that they would "do no hurt" to Thomas. In May 1458, he accompanied John and Warwick to Calais—of which the latter was now captain—as part of a diplomatic delegation to address infringements of the truce with Burgundy.

=== Civil war ===
By 1459 the domestic political situation—tense and partisan despite the king's efforts at reconciliation—had descended into outright civil war. When Salisbury marched south from his castle at Middleham in September to join up with the Duke of York at Ludlow, Thomas and John marched with him in a 5,000-strong army. On 23 September 1459, they encountered a larger royal force at Blore Heath, which Salisbury defeated, killing its leader, James Tuchet, Baron Audley. (Note: Little evidence survives regarding the detail of the battle, but it seems most likely that Salisbury was ambushed by a much larger royal army. Although outnumbered, Salisbury probably took the victory on account of his army of northerners being far more seasoned soldiers than Audley had at his command, while the latter may also have suffered desertions among his army. The battle was not decisive, however, and Salisbury's army retreated under cover of the night, in some confusion.) Thomas and John were captured at Acton Bridge, near Tarporley, Cheshire, the next day. Hicks has suggested that this was due to his being wounded in battle and sent home; it is also possible that they ventured too far from the main army in pursuit of fleeing Lancastrians. In any case, they were imprisoned in Chester Castle for the next nine months. Their capture endangered Salisbury's strategy: not only did he lose valuable support, but he was forced to linger longer at Market Drayton than he would otherwise have done.

Due to his imprisonment, he was not present when the Yorkist army was routed at Ludford Bridge less than three weeks after Blore Heath. Following the rout, York went into exile in Dublin, while Thomas's father, brother Warwick and York's eldest son, Edward of March, took refuge in Calais. Thomas was attainted in the Parliament of Devils in October 1459 along with the rest of his family. He was not released until the exiles had returned in May the following year and defeated a royal army at the Battle of Northampton that June. (Note: Acting as one of the king's personal bodyguard, the Nevilles' enemy Egremont was among the Lancastrian dead at Northampton.) Released into the temporary protection of Thomas, Lord Stanley, he was soon appointed to several important offices. On 22 August, he joined his father as Keeper of the Royal Mews, responsible for the royal aviary. His indenture of service recorded his authority

To purvey the king's right prises of falcons, goshawks, sakers, sakerets, 'laners', lanerets and gyrfalcons for sale through the realm, paying 20s for a falcon, 10s for a tercel gentle, 13s 1d for a goshawk, and 6s 5d each for the tercel of a goshawk, saker, laners and laneret.

This was part of the Nevilles' policy of filling the positions of political importance with their own sympathisers. (Note: Hicks has called it "decidedly a Neville-dominated regime".) Thomas was also commissioned to arrest and imprison any who disturbed the peace, and received grants of Duchy of Lancaster estates at the same time, particularly in the Midlands, where he began to establish his own authority.

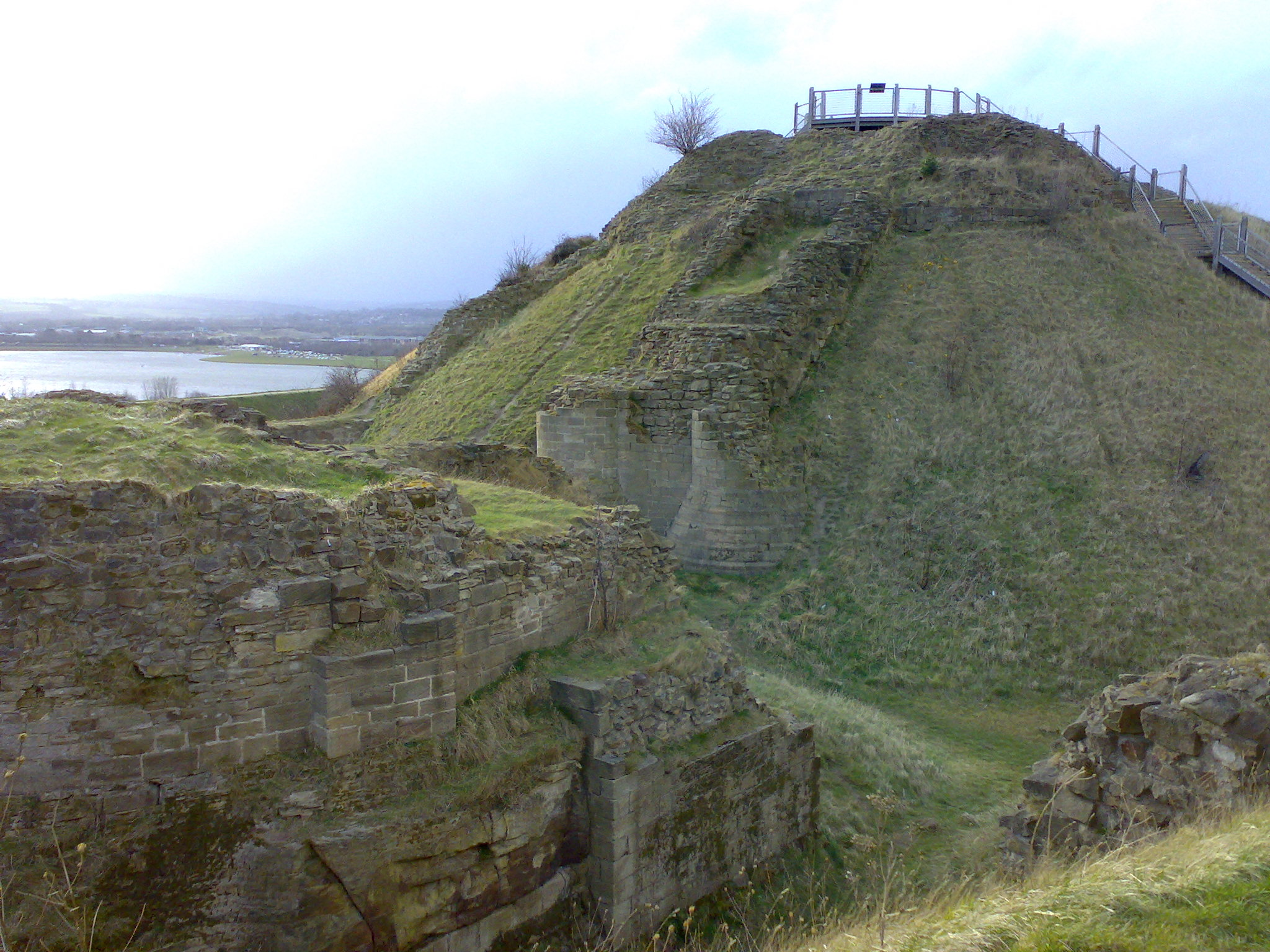
The remains of Sandal Castle, where Thomas Neville spent the last few weeks of his life, seen in 2008

When the Duke of York returned from Dublin in late September 1460, he slowly made his way to Westminster to meet the king and his peers—gathered for a forthcoming parliament—and arrived in October. To the surprise of all, he immediately claimed the throne. The Nevilles were as set against his claim as every other member of the nobility. According to P. A. Johnson, both Edward of March and the Archbishop of Canterbury, Thomas Bourchier, refused to confront the Duke of York, so on two occasions, "Thomas Neville was sent instead". He evidently backed his father in his resistance to York's claims, and first met with York at Westminster Palace on 11 October, when word reached the lords that York had evicted the King from his lodgings. York responded merely that he was intent on being crowned three days later. The lords slept on this, and then sent Thomas back that morning, where he found York preparing for his coronation. Thomas informed the duke that his position was untenable "to both lords and people". Although what was said between Thomas and the duke remains unknown, argues Johnson, his "mandate must have been both blunt and bluntly delivered", as—whatever Thomas had said—York acquiesced to a compromise agreement.

=== Battle of Wakefield ===
In the meantime, Lancastrian forces were regrouping in Yorkshire and raiding York's and Salisbury's estates and tenants. Thomas accompanied them when they marched out of London on 2 December 1460 to restore a semblance of order to the region; they arrived at York's Sandal Castle on the 21st of the month. It is possible that a Christmas truce was arranged. In any case, it is known that nine days later, York, his son Edmund, Earl of Rutland, Salisbury, Thomas, and many of their closest retainers led a sortie in strength to attack a Lancastrian army gathered near the castle. Details of the Battle of Wakefield are sparse, but the Yorkists—possibly outnumbered three to one—are known to have gone down to a crushing defeat. (Note: Historians are uncertain why York left the safety of Sandal Castle before reinforcements from the Earl of March could arrive, or why he was defeated so heavily. The French chronicler Jean de Waurin states that York could only see a small portion of the Lancastrian army, and so may have badly misjudged the odds against him. Waurin suggests the majority of the army was hidden in the forests on either side of Wakefield Green, meaning York walked into a massive ambush. It may also have been that York was running short of provisions and a foraging party was attacked. Yet another possibility is that York was betrayed. He had despatched writs of array (Note: A writ of array was a Royal writ commissioning the King's lords (York was legally acting in loco regis following the Act of Accord of the previous month), which announced a danger to the state and instructed the receiver to raise a specified number of men for a particular time and duty, being "'bound to lay to their hand' with the other lieges of the king and help to resist the malice of the enemies".), and it is possible that John, Lord Neville raised this army and brought it to York who assumed it was for his use, but which then defected with Neville to the Lancastrian army. (Note: York may have assumed that he could count on the loyalty of Lord Neville as he could the Earls of Salisbury and Warwick. Lord Neville, though, was from a different branch of the family, which had been almost dispossessed by their father, Ralph, Earl of Westmorland in favour of Salisbury's cadet branch. Indeed, it was only twenty years since the two branches of the family, including Lord Neville, had fought a minor internecine war over Salisbury. They remained loyal to the House of Lancaster through the late 1450s, although York may have been unaware of this. The simplest suggestion was that York acted rashly in the face of poor prospects.)) York died on the field. Rutland was probably knifed by Lord Clifford on Wakefield Bridge. Salisbury escaped but was captured and later executed at Pontefract Castle. Contemporaries report that Thomas died in battle. He was, says the Croyland chronicler, "without mercy or respect, relentlessly slain", while William Worcester wrote that he was "slain in the field" after around half an hour's fighting. (Note: Not all their men were killed; at least one retainer of Thomas', John Barowe, was captured and held for ransom.) Their heads were put upon stakes and taken to York—"for a spectacle to the people and a terror to the rest of their adversaryes"—where they were displayed above the gates.

== Later events ==
The Burying of an Earle

The interment of the Earl of Salisbury at Breshall [Bisham], in the shire of Buckingham (Note: The antiquarian John Gough Nichols noted in 1863, however, that "Bisham or 'Bustelham', is there misprinted and is erroneously stated to be in the county of Buckingham".) the fifteenth day of February in the second year of King Edward the Fourth, and of Sir Thomas his son, in two coffins, in one chariot with six horses in trappings, the first in St George's arms, the other covered in black, a banner of St George before him, and two behind. First, before the conveying of the body and bones of the said earl and his son, the earl of Warwick, son and heir of the said earl, rode after the chariot. Lord Montague on the right side afoot, Lord Latimer, his son, on the left hand with many knights and squires afoot on every side to the number of sixteen; the earl's banner and standard came next and immediately after the chariot; and before the earl of Warwick, meeting with the corpses a mile without the town, came two heralds and two kings of arms, bearing the coats of arms of the said earl at every corner of the chariot at which place they received the bodies and the bones so coffered...

— A collection of ordinances and regulations for the government of the Royal household, 20th-century transcription by Joel T. Rosenthal, first published by the Society of Antiquaries in 1790.

In a letter to Pope Pius II of 11 January 1461, Warwick informed him of "events in England and of the destruction of some of my kinsmen in the battle against our enemies"; his kinsmen being his father Salisbury, his brother Thomas, his cousin Edmund, and his uncle, York, as well as in-laws, such as William, Lord Harrington, who had married Warwick's sister.

Although Wakefield was a decisive blow for the Yorkists, the war was not yet over; even after news of the defeat reached Edward, now Duke of York, he continued recruiting a large army in the Welsh Marches. In early February, he inflicted a heavy defeat on the royalists under Jasper Tudor at the Battle of Mortimer's Cross. Edward made his way to London, where he met Warwick. Edward was proclaimed King Edward IV on 4 March. The Lancastrians had retreated to the north, however, and still posed a threat to the new regime. Accordingly, Edward raised a large army and followed them. On 29 March 1461, the two forces clashed at Towton in what the armourist Christopher Gravett has called "probably the largest and bloodiest battle on English soil". (Note: This view is supported by several other military historians. John Sadler describes Towton as "Britain's bloodiest day in a long history of sanguinary conflict", Philip A. Haigh as "the largest, longest fought, and bloodiest day in English medieval history", Andrew Boardman as "the biggest, longest and bloodiest military engagement on British soil", and John Goodwin as "the costliest encounter ever fought on British soil". Goodwin comments that "in the modern-day world, where something has to be the biggest, longest, even bloodiest, in order to be remarkable, then Towton has many claims to be that singular event on English soil".)

The result was a decisive victory for the Yorkists. Edward entered York in triumph the following day. The remains of Thomas Neville and the other dead of Wakefield were removed from the Micklegate Bar (Note: And replaced by Lancastrian heads, including that of the Thomas Courtenay, Earl of Devon, who, being sick, had remained in York when the Yorkists arrived. He was beheaded in Pavement the next day.) and buried at the Dominican Priory in York.

Thomas Neville's "bod[y] and bones" were reinterred in the Montagu mausoleum of Bisham Priory, Buckinghamshire with his father on 15 February 1463, a date occasioned by the death and burial there of his mother Alice in December the previous year. (Note: The scholar Alexandra Buckle argues that this was in keeping for the period, which saw "a fashion for the re-internment of relatives among the noble elite", and James Ross has pointed to similarities with the equally elaborate funerals of William Courtenay, Earl of Devon in 1511 and John de Vere, Earl of Oxford in 1513.) In a chariot drawn by six horses, accompanied by Warwick and John, Thomas and their father's bodies were conveyed south from Pontefract. They were met by another Neville brother, George, Bishop of Exeter, who conducted the service. The historian Nigel Saul has described the occasion as a "dramatic act of family piety", involving flourishes such as the presentment of Baldachin cloth and other heraldic flourishes to the newly interred. It probably acted as the blueprint upon which Edward IV's reinterment of his father and brother in 1476 was based. Warwick's choice of Bisham for his father's and brother's final resting place—rather than the Neville heartlands of northern England—was probably based on a perceived political benefits to emphasising the Montagu connection. A "rich, pageant-filled affair", continued Saul, the ceremony was accompanied by the promulgation of an elaborate commemorative roll of arms, celebrating the Neville family's lineage. Neville is portrayed with his wife Maud, as well as his parents, brothers and their wives; he and Maud wear their Arms with the tincture reversed. (Note: The heraldist Anthony Wagner has called this "a curious heraldic puzzle which remains unsolved". The importance of the document precludes it having been accidental but may have been an extra layer of differencing from the main branch of the Neville family. On the other hand, a later edition of the Roll—from around the reign of Richard III—presents the arms in their traditional colours, and, Wagner notes, no other similar usage by anyone else is known of.)

Many years later, the chronicler John Warkworth, attempting to establish the reasons for Sir Robert Welles support of Warwick and Clarence in their rebellion against Edward IV, suggested that it was due to familial ties. The connection, supposedly, was Thomas Neville, in his capacity as a "short-lived" stepfather to Welles's wife. Hicks considered this a wholly inadequate explanation. Maud married again, to Sir Gervase Clifton. An unhappy marriage, it brought Clifton into conflict with powerful Yorkists such as Anthony Woodville and Humphrey Bourchier; he was beheaded after the Battle of Tewkesbury, also in rebellion against King Edward. She lived until 30 August 1497,—a "wealthy and formidable widow"—but her connection with the Nevilles seems to have ended with the death of Thomas. The Barony of Cromwell fell into abeyance between Maud and her sister Joan at their uncle's death. Thomas's death at Wakefield temporarily left Bourchier as the sole male representative of the heirs, and he was summoned to Parliament as Lord Cromwell a month later.
