= Act of Accord =

1460 act of the Parliament of England

- Act of Parliament
- Parliament of England
- Citation: 39 Hen. 6
- Territorial extent: England

Dates
- Royal assent: 25 October 1460
- Commencement: 31 October 1460

Text of statute as originally enacted

The Act of Accord (39 Hen. 6) was an act of the Parliament of England. It was passed into law on 25 October 1460 during a period of intense political division and partisanship at the top of government. Earlier that month, Richard, Duke of York had entered the Council Chamber—in the presence of several lords—and laid his hand on the empty throne, claiming the crown of England. His grounds were that he and King Henry VI were both direct descendants of Edward III, but York possessed two claims, through both the male and female lines, and Henry's was through only one. Following discussions between royal justices, York and Parliament, the House of Lords decided that Henry was to retain the crown for life, but York and his heirs were to succeed him. This automatically removed Henry's son, Edward, Prince of Wales, from the succession. Henry agreed to the compromise, which became the Act of Accord.

Political partisanship had already erupted into the civil war the year before, and, far from lowering political pressure, the act further split the nobility§. Although Henry had publicly supported the act, Queen Margaret of Anjou refused to accept the disinheritance of their son. In this, she was joined by the majority of the English nobility, who also opposed York. King Henry, nominally the head of state, was still in London, which was controlled by the Yorkist government. Margaret, on the other hand, was in the north with her son, raising an army. This began the systematic destruction of York's and the Nevilles' Yorkshire estates. York led an army to challenge her but was killed at the Battle of Wakefield on 30 December. The Lancastrians, in turn, were defeated three months later, on the 29th March, at the bloodiest battle fought on English soil, at the Battle of Towton by York's son, who was crowned King Edward IV on 28 June 1461.

== Background ==
Throughout the 1450s, English politics became partisan and factional. Richard, Duke of York, a powerful noble and heir to the throne until 1453—when Margaret had a son—opposed King Henry VI's government. Henry was easily influenced by favourites, particularly Edmund, Duke of Somerset. In August 1453, when Henry had a nervous breakdown, becoming comatose and unable to feed himself or recognise people, (Note: The precise nature of Henry's illness is unknown, but Griffiths describes it as "a severe mental collapse, accompanied by a crippling physical disablement".) the House of Lords appointed the Duke of York Protector of the Realm. This office was effectively a resurrection of that which Humphrey, Duke of Gloucester and John, Duke of Bedford had held during the minority of Henry VI. It was decidedly limited in its powers—the Protector's authority was constrained by the council, which oversaw it. The lords favoured York for the position by way of being the King's closest adult kinsman, as had his predecessors, Gloucester and Bedford, been to Henry V. (Note: Professor Roskell notes that Gloucester and Bedford had been Henry V's closest male relatives, but this did not apply to York, as by now, the King had a son. However, Roskell comments, Prince Edward was less than two years old, and the lords had been appointed–if even in name only—someone "incapable of government by reason of age to rule on behalf of one incapacitated by imbecility [it] would have been a reductio ad absurdum of the Protector's office".) York and his allies, the powerful northern Neville family—Richard, Earl of Salisbury and his son, Richard, Earl of Warwick—now ran the government. Somerset was imprisoned for treason.

During this period, strong kings were seen as essential to sound governance and peace, but weak government led to disorder. Contemporaries attributed the rise in violence and feuding to the King's weakness. The violence between the Percys and Nevilles in Yorkshire was of such breadth that it impacted with government, and a chronicler called it the "beginning of the greatest sorrows in England". Other regional violence took place between the Bonvilles and Courtenays in the southwest, the Harrington and Stanley families in the northwest, the Earls of Shrewsbury and Wiltshire on the Welsh marches, and between William Tailboys and Ralph, Lord Cromwell in the Midlands. Those disaffected with King Henry centred around York, and as such are often known as Yorkists; those loyal to the king—most of the nobility—are Lancastrian, after the royal dynasty. (Note: The labels "York and Lancaster" oversimplify the complex networks of loyalties and connections by which the English nobility was interlinked. At the beginning of the Wars of the Roses, the House of Lancaster—whose supporters have been labelled "Lancastrian"—was the ruling, governing dynasty founded by King Henry IV. His primary title had been Duke of Lancaster, and in 1399 he usurped the throne and deposed his cousin, Richard II. The ancestors of the Duke of York accepted the new political paradigm throughout the reign of Henry IV and his son Henry V, as did York himself throughout most of Henry VI's reign. Henry was both inept as a ruler and manipulable by powerful noble advisors, and they gradually alienated the Duke from central government. Those who gathered around him in opposition to these favourites—and later the King and Queen themselves—were known as "Yorkists".)

In 1455 the king recovered his sanity and Somerset was freed but peace remained elusive and, in May, political tension became open warfare. Henry summoned a council to assemble in Leicester. In response, the Yorkists complained to him of the "doubtes and ambiguitees [and] jealousie" spread by their enemies, and several chroniclers support the view that Somerset was turning the king against York. He and the Nevilles reacted swiftly and brutally, perhaps fearing imminent arrest. In a pre-emptive strike, they ambushed the small royal army—mainly comprising just Henry's household (Note: Boardman suggests much of the King's force were men from his "stables, mews, kitchen and pantry, along with the 'above'–stairs departments of the chapel, hall, wardrobe, counting house and chamber", for example.)—at the First Battle of St Albans on 22 May. The confrontation was brief with few fatalities, but among whom were Somerset, Henry, Earl of Northumberland and Thomas, Lord Clifford. They were three of the King's most loyal and powerful supporters, and the first two were personal enemies of York and the Nevilles. The clash has been described as closer to a series of targeted assassinations to a fully fledged battle. Henry was captured by the Yorkists, who once again controlled the government. York became Protector a second time, albeit only until February 1456, when the king felt he had enough support among the lords to rule alone.

Four years of peace followed. By 1459, despite the king's efforts at reconciliation, politics again erupted into civil war. In September 1459, Salisbury, who the previous year had determined to "take the full part" with York, brought a 5,000-strong army from Middleham Castle to meet York at Ludlow. En route they encountered a larger royal force at Blore Heath, which Salisbury defeated. Salisbury's victory was temporary and, in October, the Yorkists were routed at Ludford Bridge. York went into exile in Dublin; Salisbury, Warwick and York's son, Edward of March, took refuge in the English-occupied French town of Calais. They were attainted in the Coventry Parliament soon after.

In May 1460, English politics was again overturned, when the Calais lords returned and entered London the following month. Warwick and March journeyed north and defeated the King's army at the Battle of Northampton on 10 July. Henry was once again a Yorkist prisoner.

=== York's claim to the throne ===
And coming there he walked straight on, until he came to the king's throne, upon the covering or cushion on which laying his hand, in this very act like a man about to take possession of his right, he held it upon it for a short time. But at length withdrawing it, he turned his face to the people, standing quietly under the canopy of royal state, he looked eagerly for their applause.

— Abbot Whethamstede of St. Albans Abbey, reporting on York's entrance into Westminster.

Colour chart
Red	Lancastrian claim through third son, male line
Blue	York's claim through second son, female line
Purple	York's claim through fourth son, male line
Black	No 15th-century dynastic role

Simplified York and Lancaster descent from Edward III

King Edward III (d. 1377)	Philippa of Hainault (d. 1369)
Edward the Black Prince (d. 1376)	Lionel, Duke of Clarence (d. 1368)	John of Gaunt, Duke of Lancaster (d. 1399)	Edmund, 1st Duke of York (d. 1402)
Richard II (d. c. 1400)	Philippa, 5th Countess of Ulster (d. 1381) m. Edmund Mortimer, 3rd Earl of March	Henry Bolingbroke (d. 1413), Earl of Derby, 2nd Duke of Lancaster, later Henry IV	Edward, 2nd Duke of York (d. 1415)
Roger Mortimer, 4th Earl of March (d. 1398)	Henry V (d. 1422)
Henry VI (d. 1471) m. Margaret of Anjou)
Edward of Lancaster (d. 1471)
Edmund Mortimer, 5th Earl of March (d. 1425)	Anne Mortimer (d. c. 1411)	Richard, Earl of Cambridge (d. 1415)
Richard, 3rd Duke of York, 6th Earl of March (d. 1460) m. Cecily Neville
Edward IV, 4th Duke of York, 7th Earl of March (d. 1483)	George, Duke of Clarence (d. 1478)	Richard III (d. 1485)

The House of Lancaster descended from John of Gaunt, Duke of Lancaster, the third surviving son of Edward III. This emphasised the male line of descent. On the other hand, the House of York descended from King Edward twice, from Edmund of Langley, Duke of York, the fourth surviving son of Edward, Gaunt's younger brother. York also possessed a claim through the second son, Lionel of Antwerp, Duke of Clarence and unlike the Lancastrian claim, this claim was based upon a female line of descent, as Clarence had only had a daughter, Philippa. This was considered the stronger of York's two claims, as although it was passed through the female line, it was as a descendant of an elder—so dynastically superior—son. Langley's son, Richard, Earl of Cambridge, had married Anne de Mortimer, daughter of Roger Mortimer and sister of Edmund Mortimer. York also argued that Henry Bolingbroke—son of John of Gaunt and Duke of Lancaster—had unjustly taken the throne in 1399 when he deposed King Richard II. York's assertion was essentially a legitimist de jure claim. York's claim and right to the throne had long been recognised by the Royal council and in law, but it became hypothetical after Margaret gave birth to the king's son, Edward of Westminster. Hence, when York claimed the throne before Parliament on 10 October 1460, it was legally within his right to do so; whether it was tactically sound was less certain.

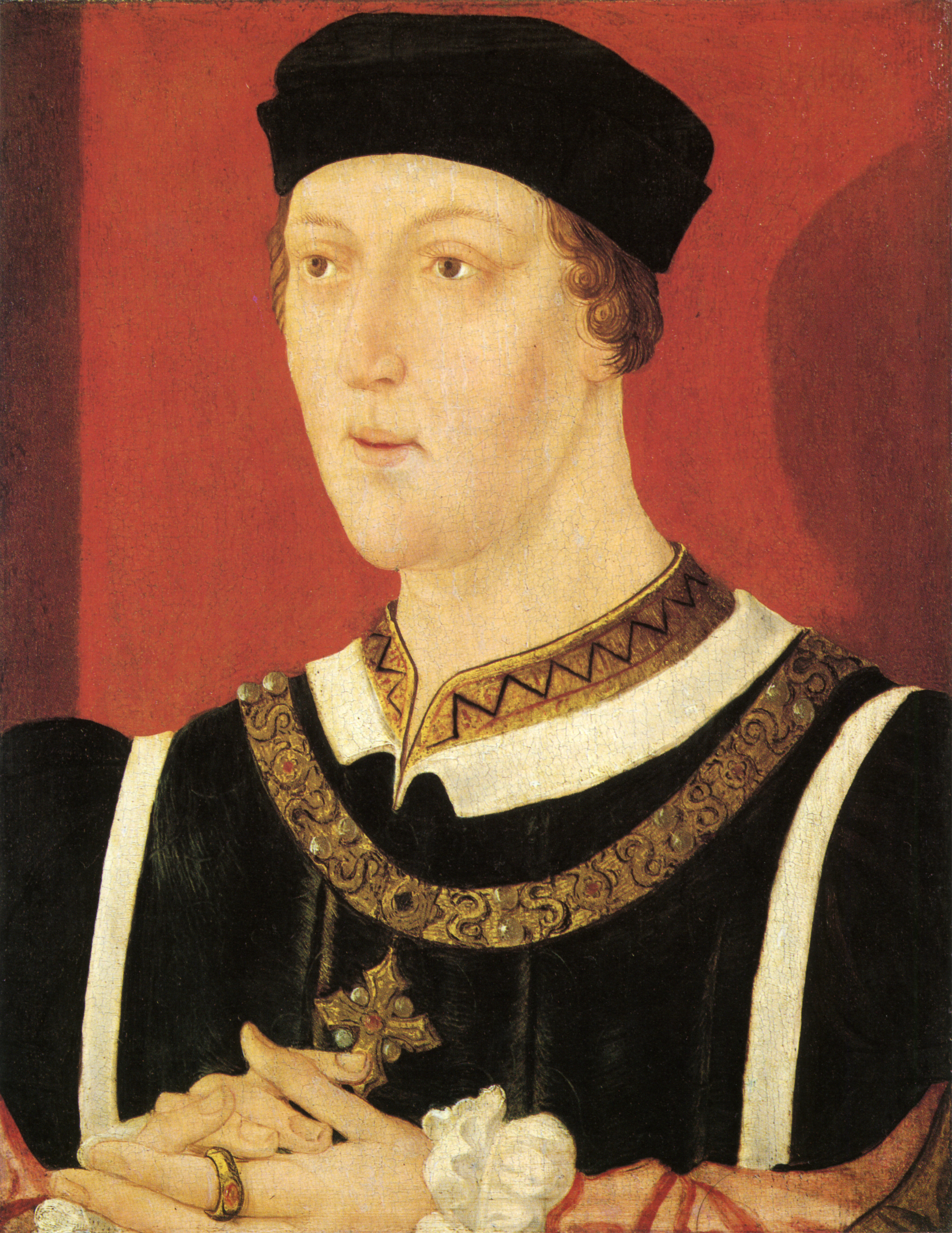
King Henry VI, whose grandfather had deposed Richard II

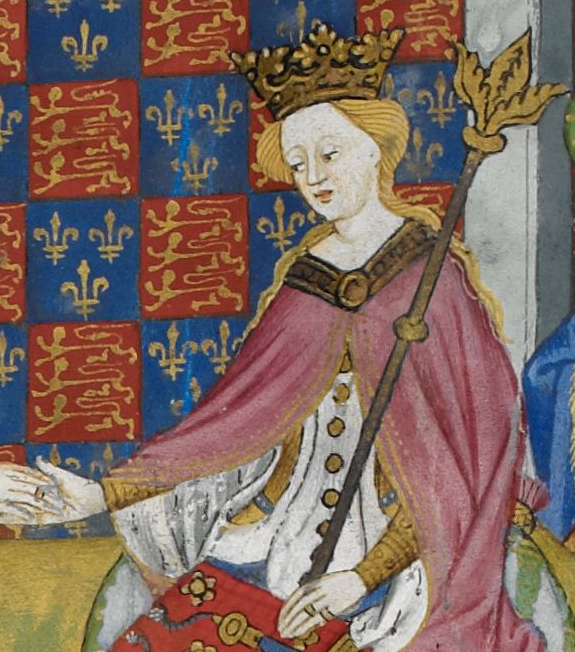
His wife, Margaret of Anjou, the eventual figurehead of her husband's government

It is not known how much the Nevilles knew of York's plan before his arrival from Ireland. Warwick had met with York in Dublin while they were both in exile. (Note: As Admiral of the Seas, Warwick had the Calais navy at his disposal, with which he sailed to Ireland on a "great journey". On the outward voyage, he seized merchant shipping for their spoils and, on his return, he effectively defeated a royal fleet under the Duke of Exeter outside Dartmouth.) It is unknown what they discussed, and they later met in Burford on York's return to England. It is possible that the earl knew of York's intentions; the medievalist Alex Brondarbit argues that Warwick "may have been pushing the duke into a step [York] had proved unwilling to take for nearly a decade". There was no swell of public acclamation when York landed as he might have expected. If Warwick had known of the duke's plans, he presumably felt it necessary to distance himself from them when he saw York's reception. The same may have gone for the Earl of March. The medievalist Michael Jones has queried whether Warwick was keen to disassociate himself from York's plan because it had been his responsibility to raise popular support in London before the duke returned, but he had failed to do so. Each of the lords concerned had, relatively recently, expressed their utmost loyalty to Henry as their liege lord; that might now be looked on as perjurous, especially if their protests of disagreement with York were now doubted.

== York claims the throne ==
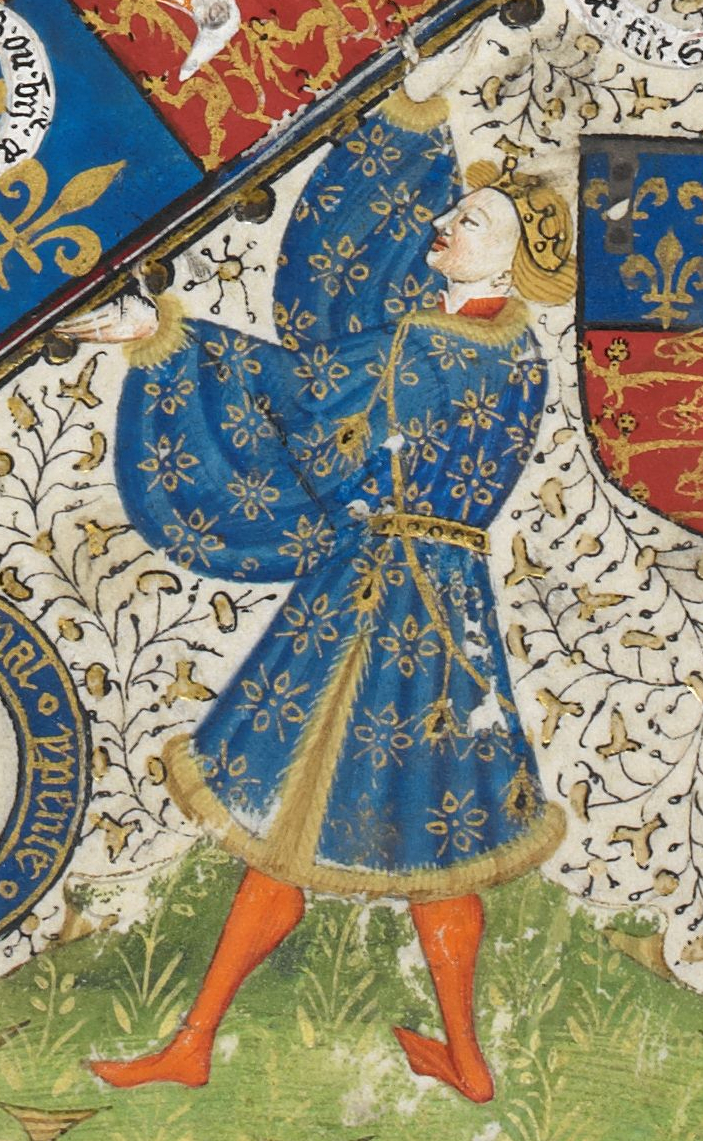
Richard of York, a descendant of Edward III and claimant to the English crown

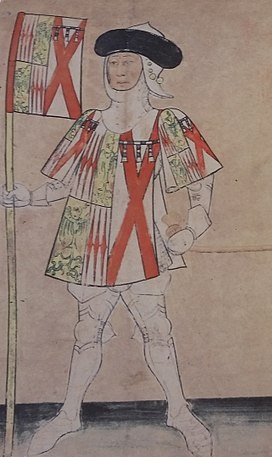
Richard, Earl of Salisbury, longtime associate of York's, leader of the House of Neville and father of the Kingmaker

York did not hide his dynastic ambitions; following his landing near Chester in early September 1460, charters and letters signed under his seal began omitting reference to the regnal year, which according to the historian Charles Ross was "quite out of conformity with usual practice". This proclaimed York's royal blood to all. On entering London, his sword was borne aloft before him, as at a coronation. (Note: The early 15th-century chronicler Thomas Walsingham described how, at Richard II's coronation, the new king's "sword was born aloft before him by Simon Burley".) Rather than just his traditional Mortimer quarterings, his trumpeters' banners were emblazoned with the Arms of England, in the manner of a king.

York travelled to Westminster to meet the king and his peers, many of whom were gathered for Parliament, which had opened on 7 October. It soon became clear that his time in Dublin had allowed him to consider his claim to the Lancastrian crown. To the surprise of all those gathered, he immediately did so. John Whethamstede, Abbot of St Albans, described how York marched across the Great Hall with armed men and reached for the throne "like a man taking possession". Whethamstede indicates that York assumed he had the support of most the English nobility. He was wrong. He waited for applause that never came. Thomas Bourchier, Archbishop of Canterbury, asked if York wanted an audience with the King. York replied, "I do not recall that I know anyone within the kingdom whom it would not befit to come sooner to me and see me rather than I should go visit him". The response was an "embarrassed" silence, and consternation. York had "shocked and angered" his colleagues, resulting in his claim being fiercely opposed. The historian Paul Johnson has called York's behaviour "an act of supreme stupidity".

The Nevilles were as averse to York's claim as other nobles. The pro-Yorkist French chronicler Jean de Wavrin reported that Warwick had "angry words for the earl [and] showed the duke how the lords and people were ill content against him because he wished to strip the king of his crown". According to Johnson, both York's eldest son, Edward of March, and Archbishop Bourchier refused to confront the Duke of York, so on two occasions, he sent Salisbury's second son Sir Thomas instead. He backed his father and brother against York's claims. By 11 October, York had Henry removed from the palace's royal quarters, so enabling York to lodge there. They were not to meet again in person until the act's ratification at the end of the month.

The king's household had been cleansed following Northampton, so he was by now surrounded by unfamiliar servants, men not of his choosing and more like keepers than aides. Now isolated, the king was effectively a prisoner. When York claimed the throne, says Griffiths, Henry's "natural timidity and alarm led him to avoid the duke in the corridors and suites of Westminster". The Lords considered that only the king had the necessary understanding of the nature of royalty required to assess York's claim, as "his seid highnes had seen and understonden many dyvers writyngs and cronicles". Henry rejected the opportunity to pass his own judgement on York's claim, wishing the lords to "find ... all such things as might be objected and laid against the claim".

York openly spoke of being crowned three days later. Thomas advised strongly against this. He reported to the nobles, who sent him back for further negotiation. This time, Thomas found York preparing for his coronation. He informed the duke that his position was untenable "to both lords and people". What was said between Thomas and the duke remains unknown, but Johnson argues that his "mandate must have been both blunt and bluntly delivered", as York abandoned his coronation plans and acquiesced to the idea of a compromise agreement.

== Negotiations and the act of Parliament ==
On Saturday, 18 October, the lords requested that the royal justices examine York's matter. Two days later, they declined to do so, arguing that the king's God-given regality was beyond their mortal and legal competence. The lords then turned the matter over to the serjeants-at-arms. They, too, refused to deal with it, "predictably", says The History of Parliament Online (HPO), on the grounds that anything that was outside the judges' remit must necessarily be beyond theirs also. The process of questioning York was returned to the lords. Their most important question to York was why, if he based his claim on his descent from Clarence, he bore the Langley arms. To this, York responded that his reasons were known to the realm at large and that just because he had never worn the Clarence arms, this did not eliminate his claim to them: "Though right for a time rest and be put to silence, yet it rotteth not nor shall it perish", York wrote in reply.

=== Parliament ===
At which parlement the commones of the reame being Assembled in the common house, comonyng & treting upon the title of the said Duke of York, sodenly fill doun the crown which hang than in myddes of the said hous, which is the ffraytor of the Abbey of Westmynster, which was take for A prodige or token that the reign of King Henry was ended. And also the Crown which stode on the highest toure of the steple in the Castel of Dover, fil down this same yere. (Note: Transcribes as, generally: At which parliament, the commons of the realm being assembled in the common house, coming and treating upon the title of the said Duke of York, suddenly fell down the crown which hung then in the midst of the said house (Note: Meaning the refectory.) of the abbey of Westminster which was taken for a prodigy or token that the reign of King Harry was ended. And also the crown which stood on the highest tower of the steeple in the castle of Dover fell down the same year.)

— The Brut chronicle

Ross argues that "York had miscalculated, but he did not intend to allow his claim to be ignored". Having failed to achieve popular acclamation, he pushed his case on a legal front, and it constitutes almost the only business recorded on the Parliamentary Roll for the October 1460 session. Both Houses are known to have debated the issue, but the sole extant copy comes from the House of Lords. Intense negotiations took place between York, the Nevilles and the lords, along with York's councillors and Henry's lawyers.

At a meeting between the Houses of Lords and Commons on 7 October, Parliament acknowledged York's position. On the 24th, it passed the Act of Accord, which was promulgated on the last day of the month. Parliament had, in effect, upheld the Yorkist claim to the throne and, according to historian Craig Taylor, "only the reluctance to remove an anointed king, and so to call into question the legality of the actions of the monarchs since the usurpation of 1399, prevented more radical action from being taken". The lords' eventual compromise intimates their own suspicion that both parties' claims were to some degree flawed. The lords were doubtless under pressure from York's councillors to reach an agreement, but before they did, the chancellor implored them to propose a better solution, even at that last minute. No one did, and the king gave his assent the next day. The resulting compromise mirrored the 1420 Treaty of Troyes, which had disinherited the French Dauphin, Charles, in favour of Henry of Monmouth (later Henry V of England), while allowing Charles VI to remain king until he died. Forty years later, the Act of Accord decreed that Henry would retain the throne for life, but that on his death, instead of it descending to the Prince of Wales, York—now heir apparent—or York's heirs would succeed instead. This also applied if Henry chose to abdicate the throne.

Boardman suggests that the lukewarm acceptance of York's claim indicates the level of support Henry still commanded. The act specifically forbade his removal by forcible means, and even though many of York's supporters felt Henry was incapable of ruling, they preferred to see him as a figurehead rather than York as a king. The nobility present at this parliament—which Ross notes is "the more remarkable" as many of Margaret and Henry's strongest supporters were not present—may still have felt latent loyalty to the king as God's anointed. It is also possible that those who might otherwise have supported him were loath to do so on account of his long absence in Dublin while the Nevilles fought his campaign. Ross suggests that the nobility's willingness to keep Henry in power but jettison his son suggests that their loyalty was to him rather than Margaret, Edward or the dynasty; they may have believed—or chosen to believe—the rumours of Edward's illegitimacy. (Note: Rumours had been spread by Warwick, as part of Yorkist propaganda, from almost the moment of Edward's birth, that he was actually the son of either a passing tradesman or the Duke of Somerset.)

For the third time in his life, York was made de facto Protector; this time he was not merely replacing one set of councillors with another, which had effectively been the extent of his powers on previous occasions. York received 10,000 marks, of which half was to be split between March and Rutland. (Note: March was to receive 3,500 marks and Rutland 1,500 marks.) The money was to come from the Prince of Wales's own patrimony as well as the revenues of the earldom of Chester and duchy of Cornwall. (Note: It is probable that from this grant stems the erroneous supposition that York was also granted these royal titles.) Perhaps most importantly, from York's perspective, the act granted him the moral high ground against his opponents and the legal machinery and wages to pursue them. Since 1351, if a "man doth compass or imagine the Death of our Lord the King, or [his] Heir", it had been deemed High Treason; now York's political opponents were legally traitors.

=== Reception ===
Most of York's supporters would probably have been satisfied with the return of their estates and titles, and indeed, this was the first item on the parliamentary agenda. The business of overturning the Coventry Parliament's attainders and forfeitures had already begun with acts of council. The Nevilles had started receiving lands in August and, on the second day of the parliament, Salisbury's attainder was overturned, says the parliamentary record, on the grounds that it had been obtained "through the sinister labours of persons intending the king's destruction". Very little other business was conducted, no new attainders being brought nor reforms inducted. On 31 October, the king, York, March and Rutland swore public oaths to keep the peace and uphold the agreement. Having sworn to protect the king's life, York presumably expected the king to reciprocate, argues George Goodwin: "He may not have been crowned, but York's person was now sacrosanct". An attack on York was now legally treason. The act was promulgated in the City of London on 9 November 1460.

The Act of Accord did not prevent civil war nor address the reasons for its cause. York's claim turned the political struggle from a partisan one to a dynastic one. Argues Boardman, "disinheritance was a grave matter", and it may have been this that turned Queen Margaret into York's implacable enemy. It may have enabled the gentry and urban gentry to support York with a clearer conscience, now that it was law; it may also have driven Yorkist loyalists away, who until now had not been forced to make a clear renunciation of the king. Margaret would never accept the disinheritance of her son and this perhaps encouraged her and her supporters to see York's death as the only chance of returning Edward to what they considered his rightful position. John Gillingham has argued that it is possible that the act made Margaret's position stronger, at least among her supporters and those previously wavering in their support. The queen and her supporters were ready to, and capable of, waging civil war in the defence of her son's interests even if her husband—then still in London under the control of the Yorkists—was not. The nobility who did not attend the parliament—long-term Lancastrian lords and enemies of York—had not been in attendance, and thus had not consented to the act, nor were they bound by it.

== Aftermath ==
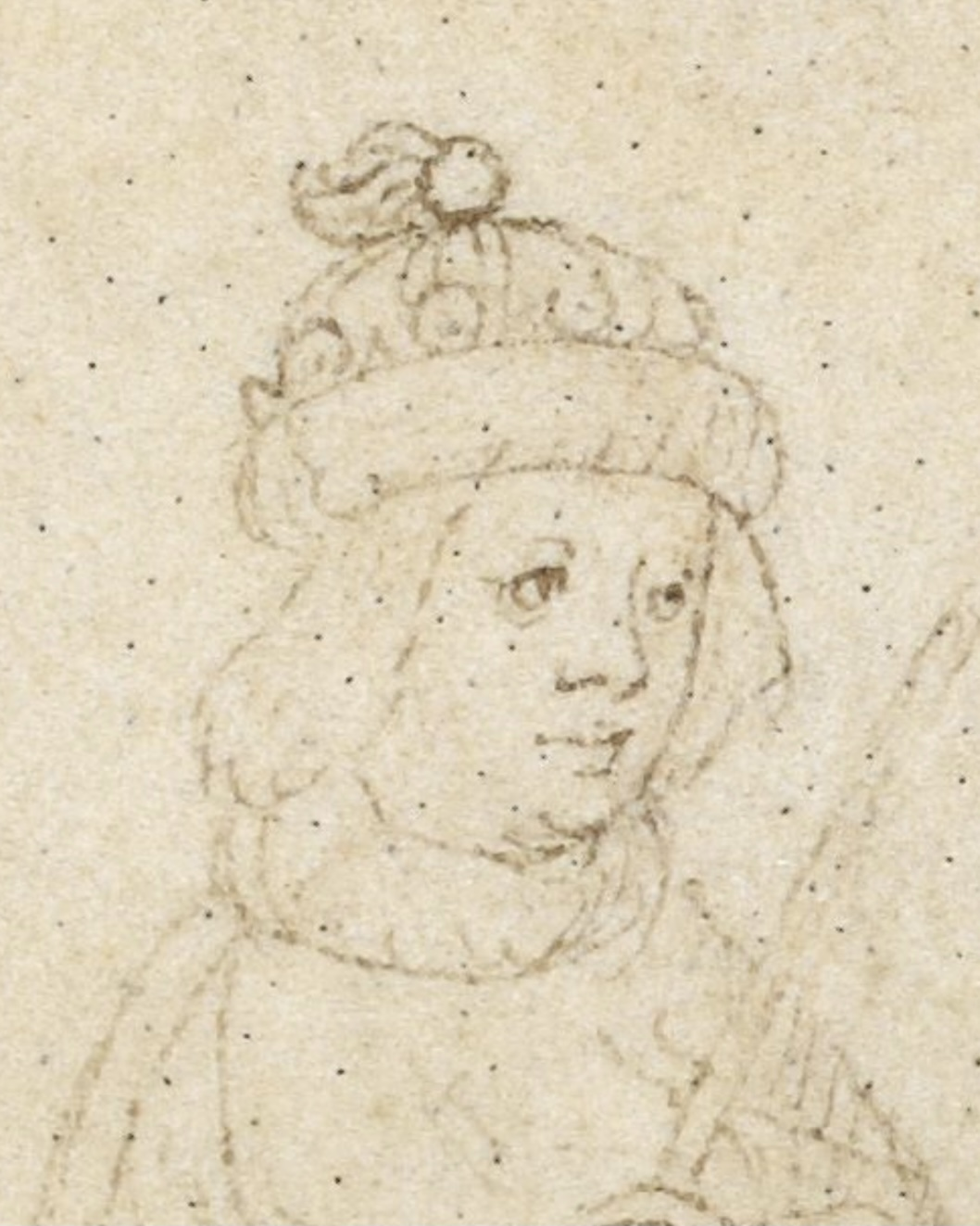
Near contemporaneous image of the disinherited Edward, Prince of Wales

Events elsewhere needed urgent government intervention. The Scots had captured Roxburgh Castle and were poised to march on Berwick. The bulk of the Lancastrian army was regrouping in Yorkshire, where much of the nobility was loyal to Henry. Margaret rapidly raised an army which began attacking York's and Salisbury's estates and tenants. Law and order were thus high on York's priorities. While no one in government could state openly that it was the queen and Henry's supporters who were behind the discontent—instead, it was phrased as a need to protect the kingdom's borders from invasion by the Scots—HPO suggests that "it is clear from indirect references that the duke received a specific royal command to deal with the unrest".

The Yorkist lords left London on 2 December 1460 to restore order to the region, arriving at York's Sandal Castle on the 21st. Nine days later, York, his son Edmund, Earl of Rutland, Salisbury, Thomas, and many of their closest retainers led a sortie in strength to attack a Lancastrian army gathered near the castle. Details of the Battle of Wakefield are sparse, but the Yorkists—possibly outnumbered three to one—are known to have suffered a crushing defeat. York and Thomas Neville died on the field. Rutland and Salisbury both attempted escape; Rutland was probably knifed by Lord Clifford on Wakefield Bridge, and Salisbury was captured after the battle, and later executed at Pontefract Castle.

Wakefield was a severe blow to the Yorkists, but the war was not over. Even after news of the defeat reached Edward, now Duke of York, in the Welsh Marches, he continued recruiting a large army; this force may have originally been intended to go north and join his father at Sandal. In early February, he inflicted a heavy defeat on the royalists under Jasper Tudor at the Battle of Mortimer's Cross. Edward made his way to London, where he met Warwick, who had just been defeated by Margaret's army at the Second Battle of St Albans. By now, the act appeared less likely to restore peace than ever, and its full implications became apparent. Since Henry's supporters had breached the agreement's terms and his own oaths, he had abrogated his kingship. Edward was proclaimed King Edward IV on 4 March. The Act of Accord was now declared null and void; it was no longer necessary. In Edward's first parliament, held in November, the Commons accused Henry of allowing "unrest, inward war and trouble, unrightwiseness, shedding and effusion of innocent blood, abusion of the laws, partiality, riot, extortion, murder, rape and vicious living" throughout the kingdom, thus breaching the act. He was then declared a usurper. The historian John Watts has argued that by re-joining Margaret's army after Second St Albans, Henry triggered the act's abdication clause. The victorious Lancastrian army had retreated to the north and still posed a threat to the new regime. Accordingly, Edward raised a large army and followed them. On 29 March 1461, the two forces clashed at the Battle of Towton, in what has been described as "probably the largest and bloodiest battle on English soil". (Note: Other similar descriptions of Towton from historians are as "Britain's bloodiest day in a long history of sanguinary conflict", "the largest, longest fought, and bloodiest day in English medieval history", "the biggest, longest and bloodiest military engagement on British soil", "the costliest encounter ever fought on British soil", and that "in the modern-day world, where something has to be the biggest, longest, even bloodiest, in order to be remarkable, then Towton has many claims to be that singular event on English soil".) The result was a decisive victory for the Yorkists, and on 28 June 1461 Edward IV was crowned at Westminster Abbey. The Lancastrians' breach of the Act of Accord, making them responsible for the civil war, became the official justification for Edward's seizure of the throne. It was announced as such, for example, by Richard Beauchamp, Bishop of Salisbury, who wrote to the papal legate, Francesco Coppini, that it was a necessary response to the fact that the "treaty, peace and composition of the last Parliament were not observed by the other side". This remained a theme of Yorkist propaganda until the end of the dynasty in 1485.
