= Richard of York, 3rd Duke of York =

Claimant to the English throne (1411–1460)

Richard of York
- Lord Protector of England Duke of York Earl of March and Ulster
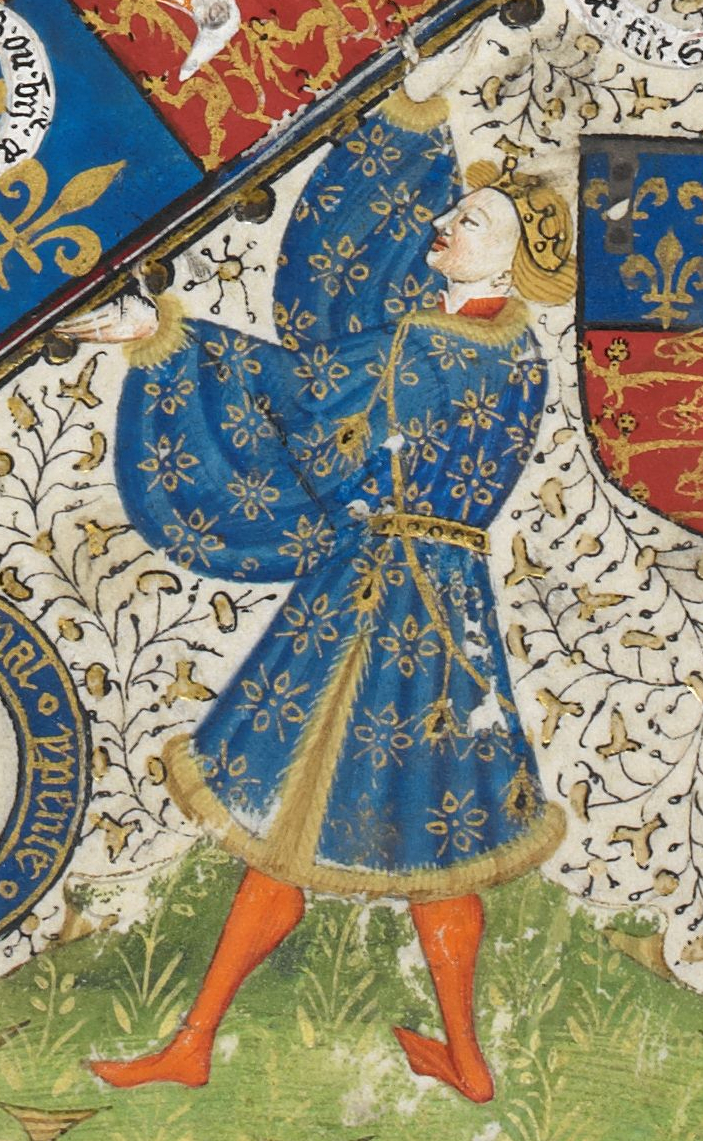
- Richard of York in the frontispiece of the Talbot Shrewsbury Book, 1445
- Born: 21 September 1411; Conisbrough Castle, Doncaster, Yorkshire, England
- Died: 30 December 1460 (aged 49); Sandal Magna, Wakefield, Yorkshire, England
- Burial: 30 July 1476; Church of St Mary and All Saints, Fotheringhay
- Spouse: Cecily Neville (m. in or before 1429)
- Issue more...: Anne, Duchess of Exeter; Edward IV of England; Edmund, Earl of Rutland; Elizabeth, Duchess of Suffolk; Margaret, Duchess of Burgundy; George, Duke of Clarence; Richard III of England
- House: York
- Father: Richard of Conisburgh, 3rd Earl of Cambridge
- Mother: Anne Mortimer

Richard of York, 3rd Duke of York (21 September 1411 – 30 December 1460), also named Richard Plantagenet, was a leading English magnate and claimant to the throne during the Wars of the Roses. He was a member of the ruling House of Plantagenet by virtue of being a direct male-line descendant of Edmund of Langley, King Edward III's fourth surviving son. However, it was through his mother, Anne Mortimer, a descendant of Edward III's second surviving son, Lionel of Antwerp, that Richard inherited his strongest claim to the throne, as the opposing House of Lancaster was descended from John of Gaunt, Duke of Lancaster, the third surviving son of Edward III. He also inherited vast estates and served in various offices of state in Ireland, France and England, a country he ultimately governed as Lord Protector due to the mental instability of King Henry VI.

Richard's conflicts with Henry's wife, Margaret of Anjou, and other members of Henry's court, such as Edmund Beaufort, 2nd Duke of Somerset, and his competing claim to the throne, were leading factors in the political upheaval of mid-fifteenth-century England, and a major cause of the Wars of the Roses (1455–1487). Richard eventually attempted to take the throne, but was dissuaded, although it was agreed that he would become king on Henry's death. However, within weeks of securing this agreement (the Act of Accord), he was killed at the Battle of Wakefield in 1460, alongside his son, Edmund. Two of his surviving sons later ascended the throne: Edward IV and Richard III.

== Descent ==
Arms of Richard of York, 3rd Duke of York: grand quarterly, 1st and 4th: royal arms of England differenced by a label of three points argent each charged with three torteaux (differenced arms of his great-grandfather King Edward III (father of Edmund of Langley, 1st Duke of York)), 2nd: Castile and León, 3rd: Mortimer quartering de Burgh; overall an inescutcheon of Holland, Earl of Kent

Richard of York was born on 22 September 1411, the son of Richard, Earl of Cambridge, and his wife Anne Mortimer. Both his parents were descended from King Edward III of England: his father was son of Edmund, 1st Duke of York (founder of the House of York), fourth surviving son of Edward III, whereas his mother Anne Mortimer was a great-granddaughter of Lionel, Duke of Clarence, Edward's second son. After the death in 1425 of Anne's childless brother Edmund, Earl of March, this ancestry supplied her son Richard, of the House of York, with a claim to the English throne that was arguably superior to that of the reigning House of Lancaster, descended from John of Gaunt, the third son of Edward III.

Richard had an only sister, Isabel. Richard's mother, Anne Mortimer, died during or shortly after his birth, and his father, the Earl of Cambridge was beheaded in 1415 for his part in the Southampton Plot against the Lancastrian King Henry V. Within a few months of his father's death, Richard's childless uncle, Edward, 2nd Duke of York, was slain at the Battle of Agincourt in 1415, and so Richard inherited Edward's title and lands, becoming 3rd duke of York. The lesser title but greater estates of the Mortimer family, along with their claim to the throne, also descended to him on the death of his maternal uncle Edmund Mortimer, 5th Earl of March, in 1425.

Richard of York already held a strong claim to the English throne, being the heir general of Edward III while also related to the same king in a direct male line of descent. Once he inherited the vast Mortimer estates, he also became the wealthiest and most powerful noble in England, second only to the king himself. An account shows that York's net income from Welsh and marcher lands alone was £3,430 in the year 1443–44.

== Childhood and upbringing ==
Upon the death of the Earl of Cambridge, Richard became a ward of the crown. As he was an orphan, his property was managed by royal officials. Despite his father's plot against the king, along with his provocative ancestry—one which had been used in the past as a rallying point by enemies of the House of Lancaster—Richard was allowed to inherit his family estates without any legal constraints. His considerable lands as duke of York meant that his wardship was a valuable gift of the crown, and in December 1423 this was sold to Ralph Neville, 1st Earl of Westmorland.

Little is recorded of Richard's early life. As a royal ward, in 1416 he was placed under the guardianship of the Lancastrian retainer Robert Waterton, under whose tutelage he remained until 1423, in a low public profile. Then, as ward of the Earl of Westmorland, York was brought up in the Neville family hearth until his majority. The earl had fathered an enormous family, having had twenty-two children, and had many daughters needing husbands; as was his right, he betrothed the thirteen-year-old Richard to his nine-year-old daughter Cecily Neville in 1424. The marriage, which took place by October 1429, meant that Richard was now related to much of the English upper aristocracy, many of whose members had themselves married into the Neville family. In October 1425, when Ralph Neville died, he bequeathed the wardship of York to his widow, Joan Beaufort. By now the wardship was even more valuable, as Richard had inherited the vast Mortimer estates on the death of the Earl of March.

Over the next few years, York was drawn more closely into the circle around the young king. On 19 May 1426 he was knighted at Leicester by John, Duke of Bedford, the younger brother of King Henry V. He was present at the coronation of King Henry VI on 6 November 1429 in Westminster Abbey, and on 20 January 1430 he acted as Constable of England for a duel in the presence of the king at Smithfield. He then followed Henry to France, being present at his coronation as king of France in Notre-Dame in 1431. Finally, on 12 May 1432, he came into his inheritance and was granted full control of his estates. On 22 April 1433, York was admitted to the knightly Order of the Garter.

== War in France ==
As York reached majority, events were unfolding in France which would tie him to the events of the ongoing Hundred Years' War. In the spring of 1434, York attended a great council meeting at Westminster which attempted to conciliate the king's uncles, the dukes of Bedford and Gloucester (heads of the regency government), over disagreements regarding the conduct of the war in France. Henry V's conquests in France could not be sustained forever, as England either needed to conquer more territory to ensure permanent French subordination, or to concede territory to gain a negotiated settlement. During Henry VI's minority, his Council took advantage of French weakness and the alliance with Burgundy to increase England's possessions, but following the Treaty of Arras of 1435, Burgundy ceased to recognise the English king's claim to the French throne.

In May 1436, a few months after Bedford's death, York was appointed to succeed him as commander of the English forces in France. York's appointment was one of a number of stop-gap measures after the death of Bedford to try to retain French possessions until the young King Henry VI could assume personal rule. His actual departure was delayed due to disagreements pertaining to the terms of his indentures. Rather than receiving the same powers Bedford had enjoyed as "regent", York was forced to settle for a lesser role as "lieutenant-general and governor", by which he was not allowed to appoint major financial and military officials.

York landed in France on 7 June 1436, disembarking at Honfleur. This was the duke's first military command. The fall of Paris (his original destination) led to his army being redirected to Rouen. Working with Bedford's captains, York had some success, recovering many lost areas in Normandy while establishing good order and justice in the duchy. The campaigns were mainly conducted by Lord Talbot, one of the leading English captains of the day, but York also played a part in stopping and reversing French advances, recapturing Fécamp and a number of towns in the Pays de Caux.

However, he was dissatisfied with the terms under which he was appointed, as he had to find much of the money to pay his troops and other expenses from his own estates. York was keen to leave France as soon as his original twelve-month term of office expired, but he was instructed to remain until the arrival of his successor, the Earl of Warwick, and he did not return to England until November 1437. In spite of York's position as one of the leading nobles of the realm, he was not included in Henry VI's Council on his return.

== France again ==
Henry VI turned to York again after peace negotiations failed. York was reappointed Lieutenant of France on 2 July 1440, this time with the same powers that the late Bedford had earlier been granted. As in 1437, York was able to count on the loyalty of Bedford's supporters, including Sir John Fastolf, Sir William Oldhall and Sir William ap Thomas. He was promised an annual income of £20,000 to support his position. Duchess Cecily accompanied him to Normandy, and his children Edward, Edmund and Elizabeth were all born in Rouen.

York reached France in 1441 and quickly moved up the Seine towards Pontoise, which was besieged by the French. Though York failed to bring the French to battle, he and Lord Talbot—in what would be the highlight of York's military career—led a brilliant campaign involving several river crossings around the Seine and Oise, chasing them almost up to the walls of Paris. In the end, all of York's efforts were in vain, for the French took Pontoise by assault in September 1441. This was to be York's only military action during his second lieutenancy.

In 1442, York continued to hold the line in Normandy. He signed a treaty with Isabel, duchess of Burgundy, at Dijon on 23 April 1443, which created an indefinite truce between England and Burgundy. Funding the war effort was becoming an increasing issue: though he was paid his annuity of £20,000 in 1441–1442, York did not receive anything more from England until February 1444.

However, in 1443 Henry VI put the newly created Duke of Somerset, John Beaufort, in charge of an army of 8,000 men, initially intended for the relief of Gascony. This denied York much-needed men and resources at a time when he was struggling to hold the borders of Normandy. Not only that, but the terms of Somerset's appointment could have caused York to feel that his own role as effective regent over the whole of Lancastrian France was reduced to that of governor of Normandy. The English establishment in Normandy expressed strong opposition to the measure, but the delegation York sent to remonstrate against the decision was unsuccessful. Somerset's campaign itself also added to the insult: his conduct brought England to odds with the dukes of Brittany and Alençon, disrupting York's attempts (conducted during 1442–43) to involve the English in an alliance of French nobles. Somerset's army achieved nothing and eventually returned to Normandy, where Somerset died in 1444. This may have been the start of the hatred that York harboured for the Beaufort family, a resentment that would later turn into civil war.

English policy now turned back to a negotiated peace (or at least a truce) with France, so the remainder of York's time in France was spent in routine administration and domestic matters. York met Margaret of Anjou, the intended bride for Henry VI, on 18 March 1445 at Pontoise.

== Role in politics before 1450 ==
York appears to have kept a low profile in English politics before his final return to England, in 1445. King Henry VI seems to have been reluctant to employ York, who was not invited to the first royal council at the end of the regency in November 1437.

Richard Duke of York in a later, imaginary engraving

York returned to England on 20 October 1445 at the end of his five-year appointment in France. He must have had reasonable expectations of reappointment. However, he had become associated with the English in Normandy who were opposed to the policy of Henry VI's Council towards France, some of whom had followed him to England (for example, Sir William Oldhall and Sir Andrew Ogard). Eventually (on 24 December 1446) the lieutenancy went to Edmund Beaufort, 2nd Duke of Somerset, who had succeeded his brother John. During 1446 and 1447, York attended meetings of Henry VI's Council and of Parliament, but most of his time was spent in the administration of his estates on the Welsh border.

York's attitude toward the Council's surrender of the French province of Maine, in return for an extension of the truce with France and a French bride for Henry, must have contributed to his appointment on 30 July 1447 as Lieutenant of Ireland. In some ways it was a logical appointment, as Richard was also Earl of Ulster and had considerable estates in Ireland, but it was also a convenient way of removing him from both England and France. His term of office was for ten years, ruling him out of consideration for any other high office during that period.

Domestic matters kept him in England until June 1449, but when he did eventually leave for Ireland, it was with Cecily (who was pregnant at the time) and an army of around 600 men. This suggests a stay of some time was envisaged. However, claiming a lack of money to defend English possessions, York decided to return to England. His financial state may indeed have been problematic, since by the mid-1440s he was owed £38,666 by the crown, (equivalent to £39.8 million in current value) and the income from his estates was declining.

== The Duke's Opposition, 1450–1453 ==
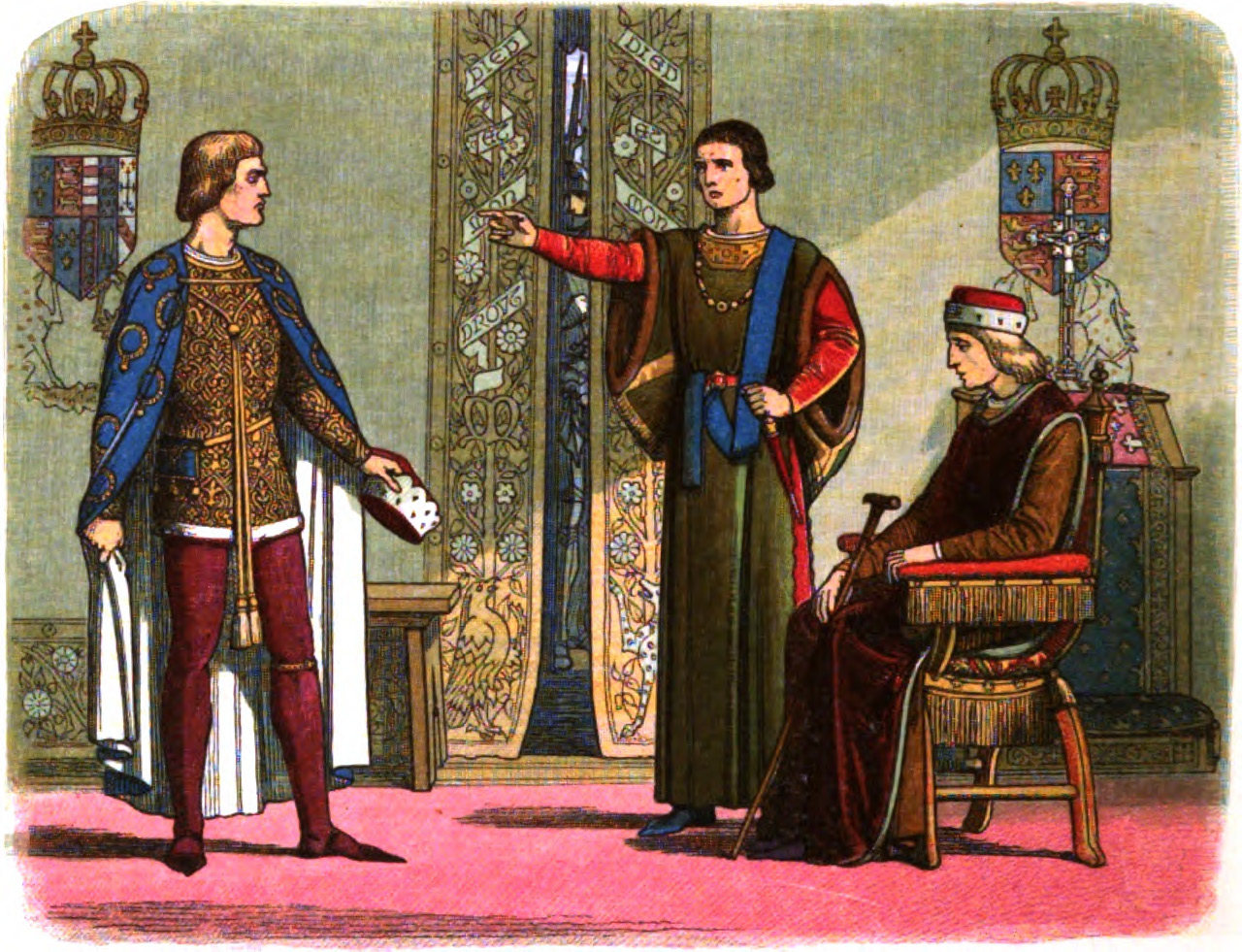
Victorian depiction of Henry VI (right) sitting while the Dukes of York (left) and Somerset (centre) have an argument

In 1450, the defeats and failures of the English royal government of the previous ten years boiled over into serious political unrest. In January Adam Moleyns, Lord Privy Seal and Bishop of Chichester, was lynched. In May the chief councillor of the king, William de la Pole, 1st Duke of Suffolk, was murdered on his way into exile. The House of Commons demanded that the king take back many of the grants of land and money he had made to his favourites.

In June 1450, Kent and Sussex rose in revolt. Led by Jack Cade (taking the name Mortimer), they took control of London and killed James Fiennes, 1st Baron Saye and Sele, the Lord High Treasurer of England. In August, the final towns held in Normandy fell to the French and refugees flooded back to England.

On 7 September 1450, York landed at Beaumaris, Anglesey. Evading an attempt by Henry to intercept him, and gathering followers as he went, York arrived in London on 27 September. After an inconclusive (and possibly violent) meeting with the king, York continued to recruit, both in East Anglia and the west. The violence in London was such that Somerset, back in England after the collapse of English Normandy, was put in the Tower of London for his own safety.

York's public stance was that of a reformer, demanding better government and the prosecution of the "traitors" who had lost northern France. Judging by his later actions, there may also have been a more hidden motive—the destruction of Somerset, who was soon released from the Tower. York's men made several attacks on the properties and servants of the Duke of Somerset, who was to be the focus of attack in parliament.

York and his ally, the Duke of Norfolk, returned to London in November with large and threatening retinues. The London mob was mobilised to put pressure on parliament itself. However, although granted another office, that of Justice of the Forest south of the Trent, York still lacked any real support outside Parliament and his own retainers. In December Parliament elected York's chamberlain, Sir William Oldhall, as speaker.

In April 1451, Somerset was released from the Tower and appointed Captain of Calais. One of York's councillors, Thomas Young, the MP for Bristol, was sent to the Tower when he proposed that York be recognised as heir to the throne, and Parliament was dissolved. Henry VI was prompted into belated reforms, which went some way to restore public order and improve the royal finances. Frustrated by his lack of political power, York retired to Ludlow.

In 1452, York made another bid for power, but not to become king himself. Protesting his loyalty, he aimed to be recognised as Henry VI's heir to the throne (Henry was childless after seven years of marriage), while also continuing to try to destroy the Duke of Somerset. Henry may have preferred Somerset to succeed him over York, as Somerset was a Beaufort descendant.

Gathering men on the march from Ludlow, York headed for London, only to find the city gates barred against him on Henry's orders. At Dartford in Kent, with his army outnumbered, and the support of only two of the nobility (the Earl of Devon and Lord Cobham), York was forced to come to an agreement with Henry. He was allowed to present his complaints against Somerset to the king, but was then taken to London and after two weeks of virtual house arrest, was forced to swear an oath of allegiance at St Paul's Cathedral.

== Protector of the Realm, 1453–1455 ==
By the summer of 1453, York seemed to have lost his power struggle. Henry embarked on a series of judicial tours, punishing York's tenants who had been involved in the debacle at Dartford. The queen consort, Margaret of Anjou, was pregnant, and even if she should miscarry, the marriage of the newly ennobled Edmund Tudor, 1st Earl of Richmond, to Margaret Beaufort provided for an alternative line of succession. By July, York had lost both of his offices, Lieutenant of Ireland and Justice of the Forest south of the Trent.

Then, in August 1453, Henry VI suffered a catastrophic mental breakdown, perhaps brought on by the news of the defeat at the Battle of Castillon in Gascony on 17 July, which finally drove English forces from France. He became completely unresponsive, was unable to speak, and had to be led from room to room. The Council tried to carry on as though the king's disability would be brief, but they had to admit eventually that something had to be done. In October, invitations for a Great Council were issued, and although Somerset tried to have him excluded, York (the premier duke of the realm) was included. Somerset's fears were to prove well grounded, for in November he was committed to the Tower.

On 22 March 1454, Cardinal John Kemp, the Chancellor, died, making continued government in the King's name constitutionally impossible. Henry could not be induced to respond to any suggestion as to who might replace Kemp. Despite the opposition of Margaret of Anjou, York was appointed Protector of the Realm and Chief Councillor on 27 March 1454. York's appointment of his brother-in-law, Richard Neville, 5th Earl of Salisbury, as Chancellor was significant. Henry's burst of activity in 1453 had seen him try to stem the violence caused by various disputes between noble families. These disputes gradually polarised around the long-standing Percy–Neville feud. Unfortunately for Henry, Somerset (and therefore the king) became identified with the Percy cause. This drove the Nevilles into the arms of York, who now for the first time had support among a section of the nobility.

== Confrontation and aftermath, 1455–1456 ==
According to the historian Robin Storey: "If Henry's insanity was a tragedy, his recovery was a national disaster." When he recovered his reason in January 1455, after 17 months of near catatonia, Henry lost little time in reversing York's actions. Somerset was released and restored to favour. York was deprived of the Captaincy of Calais (which was granted to Somerset once again) and of the office of Protector. Salisbury resigned as Chancellor. York, Salisbury, and Salisbury's eldest son, Richard Neville, 16th Earl of Warwick, were threatened when a Great Council was called to meet on 21 May in Leicester (away from Somerset's enemies in London). York and his Neville relations recruited in the north and probably along the Welsh border. By the time Somerset realised what was happening, there was no time to raise a large force to support the king.

Once York took his army south of Leicester, thus barring the route to the Great Council, the dispute between him and the king regarding Somerset would have to be settled by force. On 22 May 1455, the king and Somerset arrived at St Albans with a hastily assembled and poorly equipped army of around 2,000. York, Warwick, and Salisbury were already there with a larger and better-equipped army. More importantly, at least some of their soldiers would have had experience in the frequent border skirmishes with the Kingdom of Scotland and the occasionally rebellious people of Wales.

The First Battle of St Albans that followed hardly deserves the term battle. Possibly as few as 50 men were killed, but among them were some of the prominent leaders of the Lancastrian party, such as Somerset himself, Henry Percy, 2nd Earl of Northumberland, and Thomas Clifford, 8th Baron de Clifford. York and the Nevilles had therefore succeeded in killing their enemies, while York's capture of the king gave him the chance to resume the power he had lost in 1453. It was vital to keep Henry alive, as his death would have led, not to York becoming king himself, but to the minority rule of Henry's two-year-old son Edward of Westminster. Since York's support among the nobility was small, he would be unable to dominate a minority Council led by Margaret of Anjou.

In the custody of York, the king was returned to London with York and Salisbury riding alongside, and with Warwick bearing the royal sword in front. On 25 May 1455, Henry received the crown from York in a clearly symbolic display of power. York made himself Constable of England and appointed Warwick Captain of Calais. York's position was enhanced when some of the nobility agreed to join his government, including Salisbury's brother William Neville, Lord Fauconberg, who had served under York in France.

For the rest of the summer, York held the king prisoner, either in Hertford Castle or in London (to be enthroned in Parliament in July). When Parliament met again in November 1455, the throne was empty, and it was reported that the king was ill again. York resumed the office of Protector; although he surrendered it when the king recovered in February 1456, it seemed that this time Henry was willing to accept that York and his supporters would play a major part in the government of the realm.

Salisbury and Warwick continued to serve as councillors, and Warwick was confirmed as Captain of Calais. In June 1456, York himself was sent north to defend the border against a threatened invasion by James II of Scotland. However, the king once again came under the control of a dominant figure, this time one harder to replace than Suffolk or Somerset: for the rest of his reign, it would be the queen, Margaret of Anjou, who would control the king.

== Uneasy peace, 1456–1459 ==
Although Margaret of Anjou had now taken the place formerly held by Suffolk or Somerset, her position, at least at first, was not as dominant. York had his Lieutenancy of Ireland renewed, and he continued to attend meetings of the Council. However, in August 1456 the court moved to Coventry, in the heart of the queen's lands. How York was treated now depended on how powerful the queen's views were. York was regarded with suspicion on three fronts: he threatened the succession of the young Prince of Wales; he was apparently negotiating for the marriage of his eldest son Edward into the Burgundian ruling family; and as a supporter of the Nevilles, he was contributing to the major cause of disturbance in the kingdom—the Percy–Neville feud.

Here, the Nevilles lost ground. Salisbury gradually ceased to attend meetings of the council. When his brother Robert Neville, Bishop of Durham, died in July 1457, the new appointment was Laurence Booth. Booth was a member of the queen's inner circle. The Percys were shown greater favour both at court and in the struggle for power on the Scottish border.

Henry's attempts at reconciliation between the factions divided by the killings at St Albans reached their climax with The Love Day on 25 March 1458. However, the lords concerned had earlier turned London into an armed camp, and the public expressions of amity seemed not to have lasted beyond the ceremony.

== Civil war breaks out, 1459 ==
In June 1459 a Great Council was summoned to meet at Coventry. York, the Nevilles and some other lords refused to appear, fearing that the armed forces that had been commanded to assemble the previous month had been summoned to arrest them. Instead, York and Salisbury recruited in their strongholds and met Warwick, who had brought with him his troops from Calais, at Worcester. Parliament was summoned to meet at Coventry in November, but without York and the Nevilles. This could only mean that they were to be accused of treason.

York and his supporters raised their armies, but they were initially dispersed throughout the country. Salisbury beat back a Lancastrian ambush at the Battle of Blore Heath on 23 September 1459, while his son Warwick evaded another army under the command of the Duke of Somerset, and afterwards, they both joined their forces with York. On 11 October, York tried to move south but was forced to head for Ludlow. On 12 October, at the Battle of Ludford Bridge, York once again faced Henry just as he had at Dartford seven years earlier. Warwick's troops from Calais refused to fight, and the rebels fled—York to Ireland, Warwick, Salisbury, and York's son Edward to Calais. York's wife Cecily and their two younger sons (George and Richard) were captured in Ludlow Castle and imprisoned at Coventry.

== Wheel of fortune (1459–1460) ==
York's flight worked to his advantage. He was still Lieutenant of Ireland and attempts to replace him failed. The Parliament of Ireland backed him, providing offers of both military and financial support. Warwick's (possibly inadvertent) return to Calais also proved fortunate. His control of the English Channel meant that pro-Yorkist propaganda, emphasising loyalty to the king while decrying his wicked councillors, could be spread around southern England. Such was the Yorkists' naval dominance that Warwick was able to sail to Ireland in March 1460, meet York and return to Calais in May. Warwick's control of Calais was to prove to be influential with the wool merchants in London.

In December 1459 York, Warwick and Salisbury suffered attainder. Their lives were forfeit, and their lands reverted to the king; their heirs would not inherit. This was the most extreme punishment a member of the nobility could suffer, and York was now in the same situation as Henry of Bolingbroke (the future King Henry IV) in 1398. Only a successful invasion of England would restore his fortune. Assuming the invasion was successful, York had three options: become Protector again, disinherit the king's son so that York would succeed, or claim the throne for himself.

On 26 June 1460, Warwick and Salisbury landed at Sandwich. The men of Kent rose to join them. London opened its gates to the Nevilles on 2 July. They marched north into the Midlands, and on 10 July, they defeated the royal army at the Battle of Northampton (through treachery among the king's troops), and captured Henry, whom they brought back to London.

York remained in Ireland. He did not set foot in England until 9 September 1460, and when he did, he acted as a king. Marching under the arms of his maternal great-great-grandfather Lionel of Antwerp, 1st Duke of Clarence, he displayed a banner of the coat of arms of England as he approached London.

A Parliament called to meet on 7 October 1460 repealed all the legislation of the Coventry parliament the previous year. On 10 October, York arrived in London and took residence in the royal palace. Entering Parliament with his sword borne upright before him, he made for the empty throne and placed his hand upon it, as if to occupy it. He may have expected the assembled peers to acclaim him as king, as they had acclaimed Henry Bolingbroke in 1399. Instead, there was silence. Thomas Bourchier, the Archbishop of Canterbury, asked whether he wished to see the king. York replied, "I know of no person in this realm the which oweth not to wait on me, rather than I of him." This high-handed reply did not impress the Lords.

The next day, Richard advanced his claim to the crown by hereditary right in proper form. However, his narrow support among his peers led to failure once again. After weeks of negotiation, the best that could be achieved was the Act of Accord, by which York and his heirs were recognised as Henry's successors. However, in October 1460 Parliament did grant York extraordinary executive powers to protect the realm, and made him Lord Protector of England. He was also given the lands and income of the Prince of Wales, but was not granted the title itself or made Earl of Chester or Duke of Cornwall. With the king effectively in custody, York and Warwick were the de facto rulers of the country.

== Final campaign and death ==
While this was happening, the Lancastrian loyalists were rallying and arming in the north of England. Faced with the threat of attack from the Percys, and with Margaret of Anjou trying to gain the support of the new King of Scotland James III, York, Salisbury and York's second son, Edmund, Earl of Rutland, headed north on 2 December 1460. They arrived at York's stronghold of Sandal Castle on 21 December to find the situation bad and getting worse. Forces loyal to Henry controlled the city of York, and nearby Pontefract Castle was also in hostile hands. The Lancastrian armies were commanded by some of York's implacable enemies such as Henry Beaufort, 3rd Duke of Somerset, Henry Percy, 3rd Earl of Northumberland and John Clifford, 9th Baron de Clifford, whose fathers had been killed at the First Battle of St Albans, and included several northern lords who were jealous of York's and Salisbury's wealth and influence in the North.

On 30 December 1460, York and his forces sortied from Sandal Castle. Their reasons for doing so are not clear; they were variously claimed to be a result of deception by the Lancastrian forces, or treachery by northern lords who York mistakenly believed to be his allies, or simple rashness on York's part. The larger Lancastrian force destroyed York's army in the resulting Battle of Wakefield. York was killed in the battle. The precise nature of his end was variously reported; he was either unhorsed, wounded and overcome fighting to the death or captured, given a mocking crown of bulrushes and then beheaded. Edmund of Rutland was intercepted as he tried to flee and was executed, possibly by Clifford in revenge for the death of his own father at the First Battle of St Albans. Salisbury escaped, but was captured and executed the following night.

York was buried at Pontefract, but his severed head was put on a pike by the victorious Lancastrian armies and displayed over Micklegate Bar at York, wearing a paper crown. His remains were later moved to Church of St Mary and All Saints, Fotheringhay.

== Legacy ==
Within a few weeks of Richard of York's death, his eldest surviving son was acclaimed King Edward IV and finally established the House of York on the throne following a decisive victory over the Lancastrians at the Battle of Towton. After an occasionally tumultuous reign, he died in 1483 and was succeeded by his twelve-year-old son, Edward V, who was himself deposed after 86 days by his uncle, York's youngest son, Richard III.

Richard of York's grandchildren included Edward V and Elizabeth of York. Elizabeth married Henry VII, founder of the Tudor dynasty, and became the mother of Henry VIII, Margaret Tudor and Mary Tudor. All future English monarchs would come from the line of Henry VII and Elizabeth, and therefore from Richard of York himself.

In theatre, Richard appears in Shakespeare's plays Henry VI, Part 1, Henry VI, Part 2, and Henry VI, Part 3.

Richard of York is the subject of the popular mnemonic "Richard of York Gave Battle in Vain" to remember the colours of a rainbow in order (Red, Orange, Yellow, Green, Blue, Indigo, Violet—ROYGBIV).

== Offices ==
- Lieutenant-general and governor of France (8 May 1436 – 16 July 1437, 2 July 1440 – 29 September 1445)
- Lord Protector of the Realm of England
- Lieutenant of Ireland

== Issue ==
Richard's children who survived to adulthood

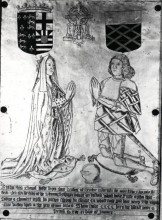
Anne, Duchess of Exeter, and her husband Thomas St. Leger

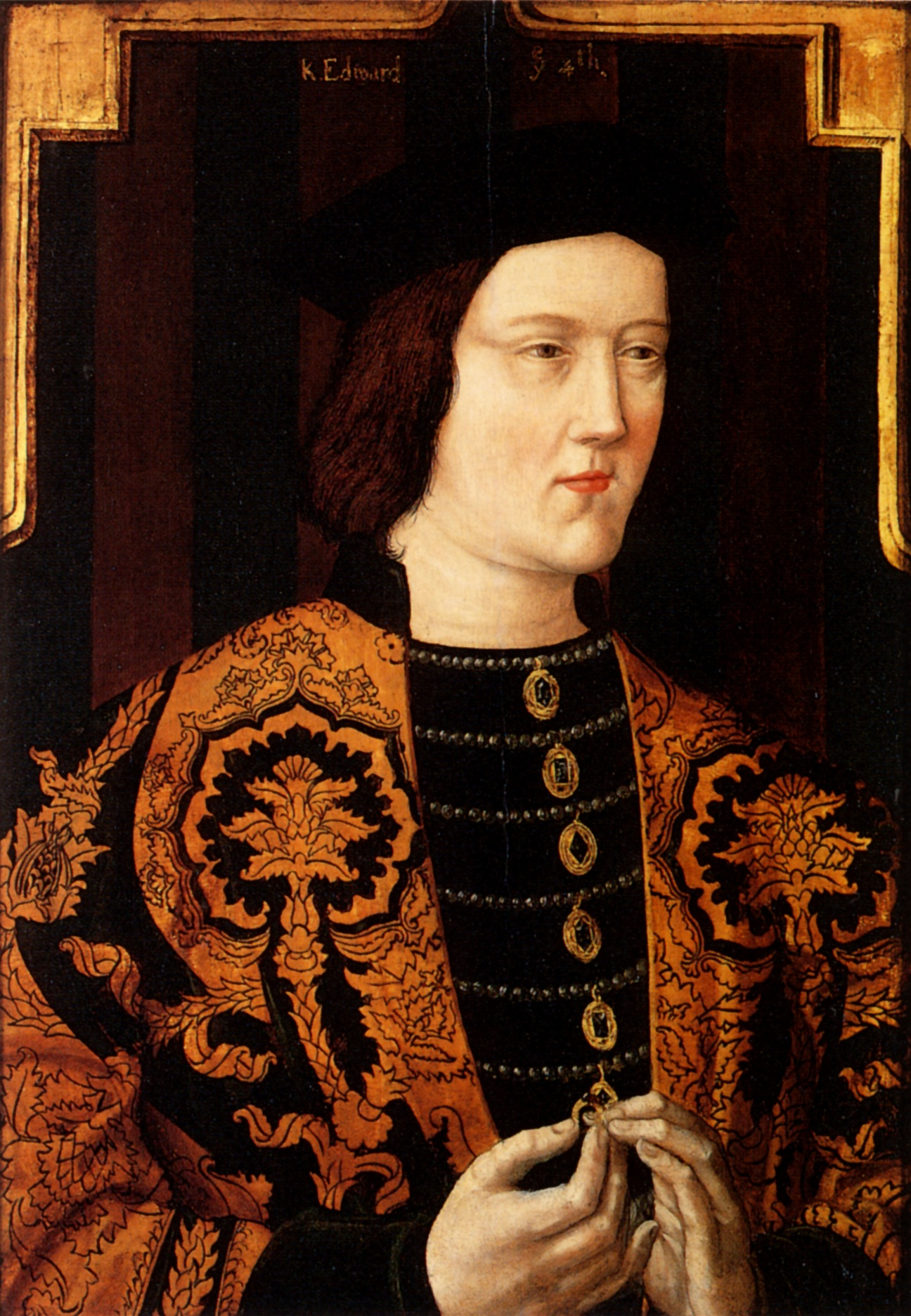
Edward IV, King of England

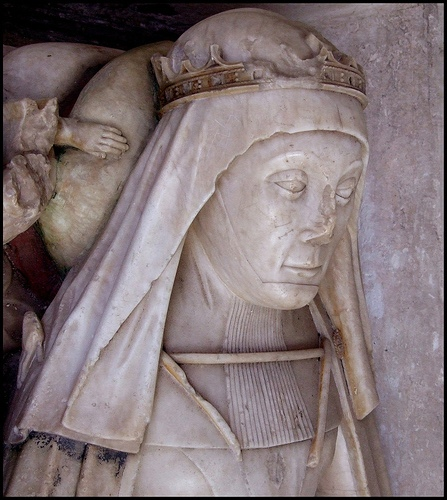
Elizabeth, Duchess of Suffolk

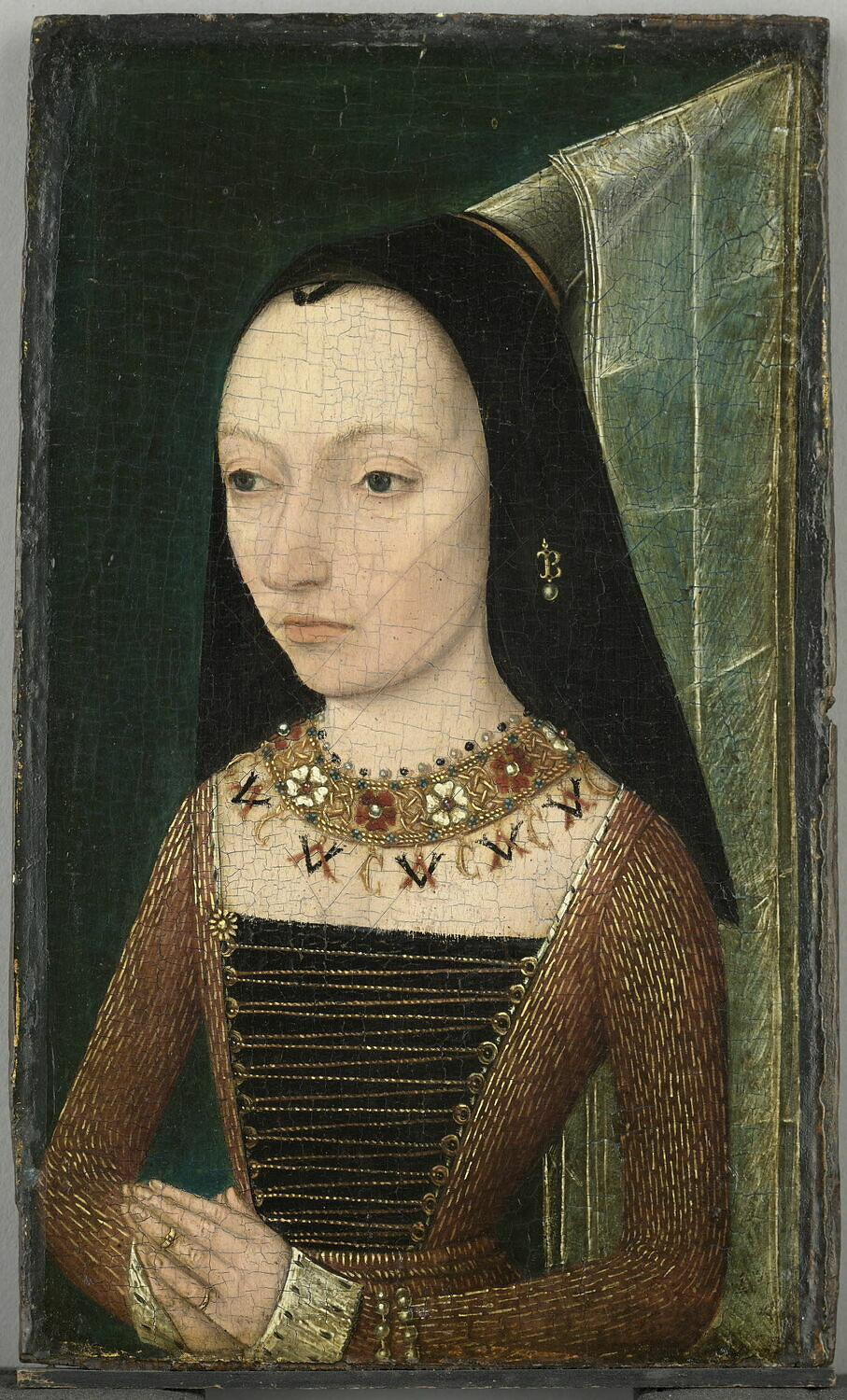
Margaret, Duchess of Burgundy

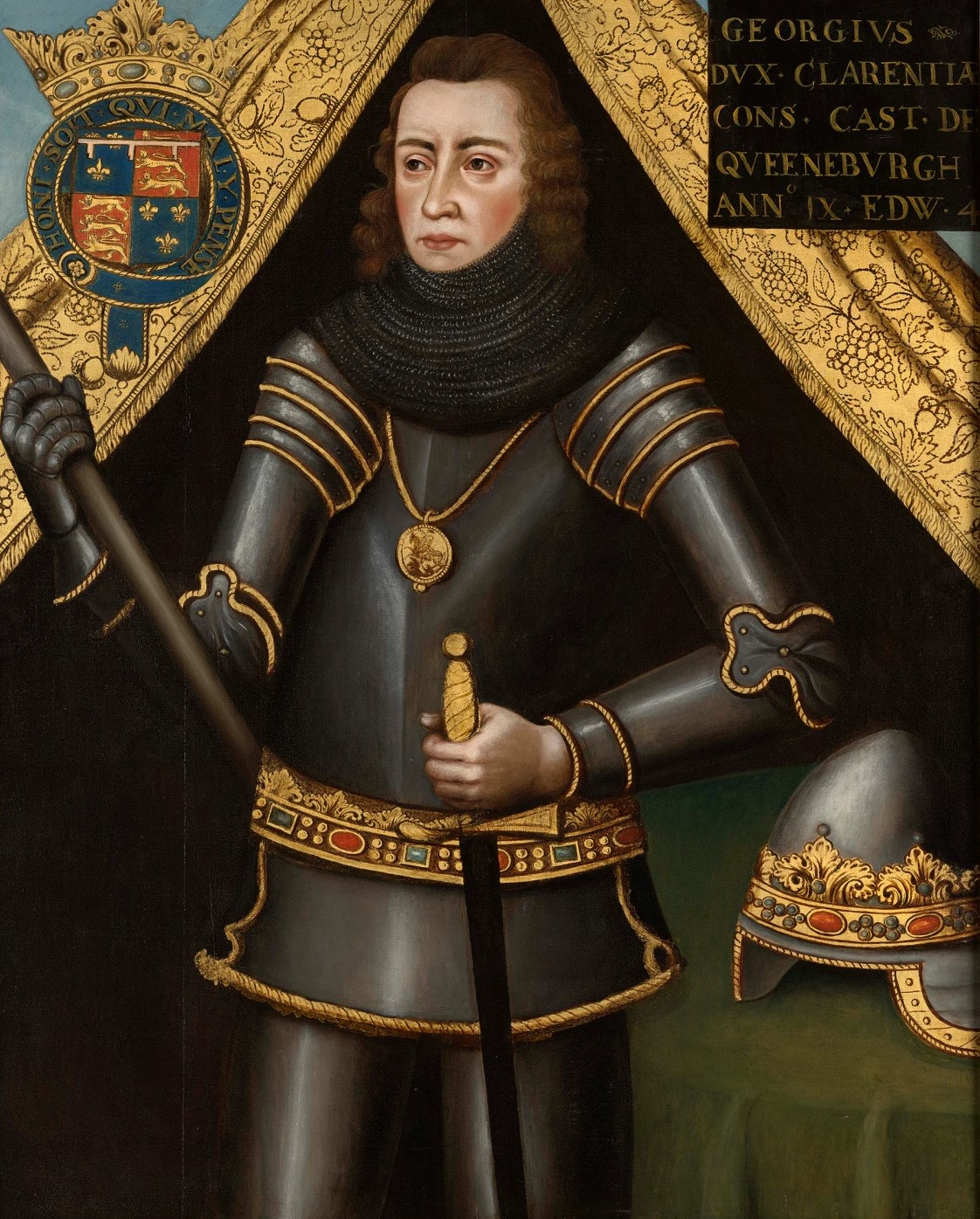
George, Duke of Clarence

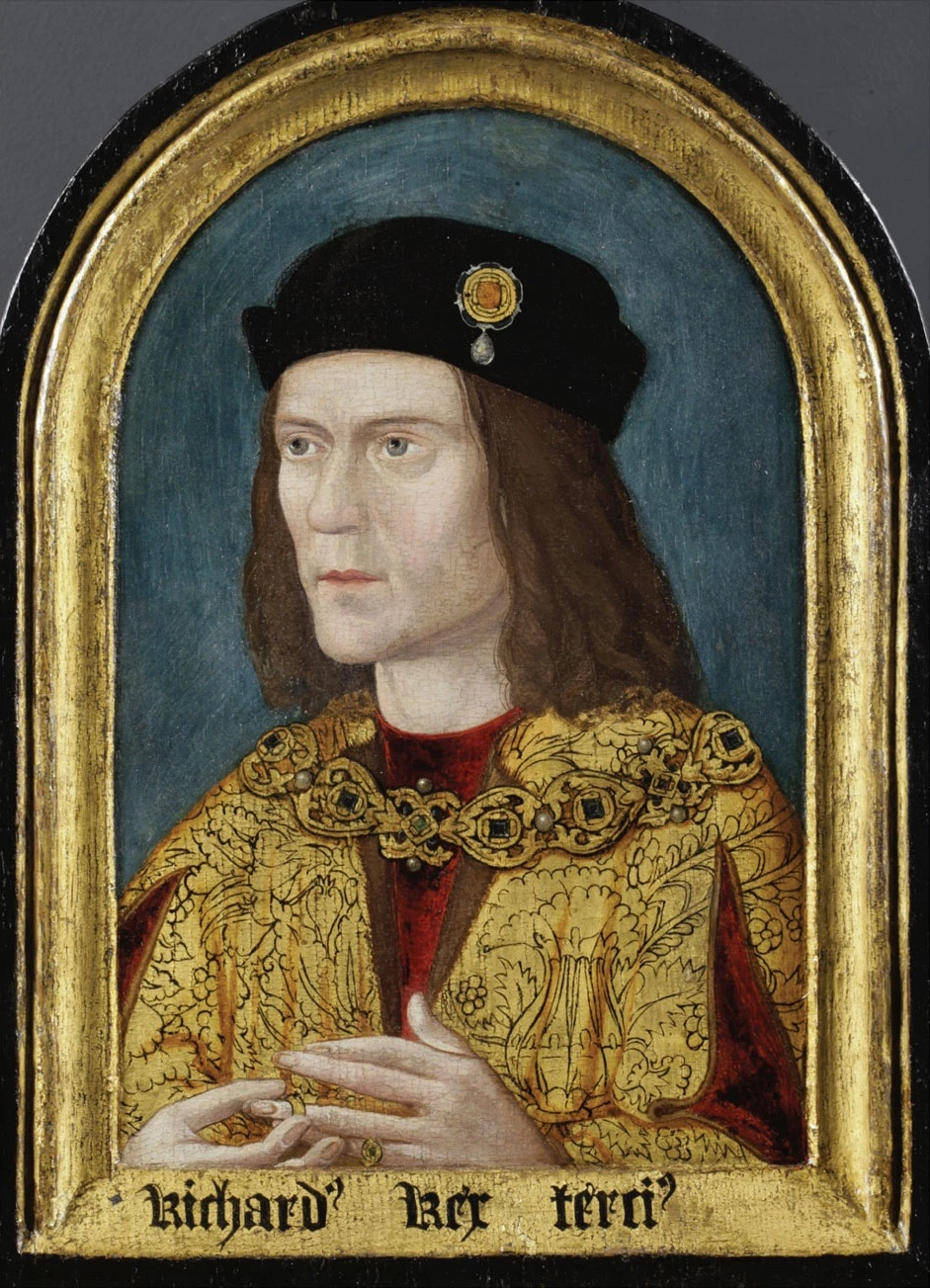
Richard III, King of England

His twelve children with Cecily Neville are:

1. Anne of York (10 August 1439 – 14 January 1476). Married to Henry Holland, 3rd Duke of Exeter, and Thomas St. Leger.
2. Henry of York (10 February 1441, Hatfield; died young).
3. Edward IV of England (28 April 1442 – 9 April 1483). Married to Elizabeth Woodville.
4. Edmund, Earl of Rutland (17 May 1443 – 30 December 1460).
5. Elizabeth of York (22 April 1444 – after January 1503). Married to John de la Pole, 2nd Duke of Suffolk (his first marriage, when a child, to Lady Margaret Beaufort was annulled when they were both aged 10 or under).
6. Margaret of York (3 May 1446 – 23 November 1503). Married to Charles the Bold, Duke of Burgundy.
7. William of York (born 7 July 1447, died young).
8. John of York (born 7 November 1448, died young).
9. George, Duke of Clarence (21 October 1449 – 18 February 1478). Married to Lady Isabel Neville. Parents of Margaret Pole, Countess of Salisbury.
10. Thomas of York (born c. 1451, died young).
11. Richard III of England (2 October 1452 – 22 August 1485). Married to Lady Anne Neville, the sister of Isabel, Duchess of Clarence.
12. Ursula of York (born 22 July 1455, died young).

== Sources ==
- Cokayne, G. (1959). G.H. White (ed.). The Complete Peerage. Vol. 12 (2nd ed.). London: St. Catherine Press.
- Gairdner, J. (1896). "Richard, Duke of York (1411–1460)" . In Lee, Sidney (ed.). Dictionary of National Biography. Vol. 48. London: Smith, Elder & Co.
- Goodman, A. (1990). Wars of the Roses: Military Activity and English Society, 1452–97. London: Routledge & Kegan Paul. ISBN 978-0-7100-0728-5.
- Griffiths, R.A. (1981). The Reign of King Henry VI. London: Ernest Benn. ISBN 978-0-510-26261-7.
- Harriss, G.L. (2004). "Richard, earl of Cambridge (1385–1415)". Oxford Dictionary of National Biography (online ed.). Oxford University Press. doi:10.1093/ref:odnb/23502. (Subscription, Wikipedia Library access or UK public library membership required.)
- Hariss, G.L. (2005). Shaping the Nation: England 1360–1461. New Oxford History of England. Oxford: Clarendon Press. ISBN 978-0-19-822816-5.
- Hicks, M.A. (1998). Warwick the Kingmaker. Oxford: Blackwell Publishers. ISBN 978-0-631-16259-9.
- Jacob, E.F. (1961). The Fifteenth Century, 1399–1485. Oxford History of England. Vol. 6. Oxford: Clarendon Press. ISBN 978-0-19-821714-5.
- Johnson, Paul A. (1988). Duke Richard of York 1411–1460. Oxford: Clarendon Press. ISBN 978-0-19-822946-9.
- Laynesmith, J. (2017). Cecily Duchess of York. Bloomsbury Academic. ISBN 978-1-4742-7225-4.
- Lyon, Ann (2003). Constitutional History of the United Kingdom. Cavendish. ISBN 9781138910676.
- Richardson, D. (2011). Kimball G. Everingham (ed.). Magna Carta Ancestry. Vol. 4 (2nd ed.). Salt Lake City. ISBN 978-1-4609-9270-8.
- Roskell, J. (1965). The Commons and their Speakers in English Parliaments 1376–1523. Manchester University Press. ISBN 978-0-7190-0078-2.
- Rowse, A.L. (1998) [1966]. Bosworth Field and the Wars of the Roses (new ed.). Wordsworth Military Library. ISBN 978-1-85326-691-1.
- Storey, R.L. (1986) [1966]. The End of the House of Lancaster (revised 2nd ed.). Stroud: Sutton Publishing. ISBN 978-0-7509-2199-2.
- Watts, John (2004). "Richard of York, third duke of York (1411–1460)". Oxford Dictionary of National Biography (online) (online ed.). Oxford University Press. doi:10.1093/ref:odnb/23503. (Subscription, Wikipedia Library access or UK public library membership required.)
- Wolffe, Bertram (2001) [1981]. Henry VI. English Monarchs series (Yale ed.). London: Yale University Press. ISBN 978-0-300-08926-4.

Richard of York, 3rd Duke of York House of York Cadet branch of the House of Plantagenet Born: 21 September 1411 Died: 30 December 1460
Legal offices
Preceded by The Duke of Gloucester	Justice in eyre south of the Trent; 1447–1453	Succeeded by The Duke of Somerset
Political offices
Preceded by The Duke of Bedford as regent	Lieutenant-general of France; 1436–1437	Succeeded by The Earl of Warwick
Preceded by The Earl of Somerset	Lieutenant-general of France; 1440–1445	Succeeded by The Marquess of Dorset
Preceded by The Earl of Shrewsbury	Lieutenant of Ireland; 1447–1460	Succeeded by The Duke of Clarence
Peerage of England
Preceded by Edward	Duke of York; 1415–1460	Succeeded by Edward Plantagenet
Preceded by Richard of Conisburgh	Earl of Cambridge; 1415–1460	Succeeded by Edward Plantagenet
Preceded by Edmund Mortimer	Earl of March; 1425–1460	Succeeded by Edward Plantagenet
Peerage of Ireland
Preceded by Edmund Mortimer	Earl of Ulster; 1425–1460	Succeeded by Edward Plantagenet
