= Fastolf =

Fastolf is a surname. Notable people with the surname include:

- John Fastolf (1380–1459), English knight
- Hugh Fastolf (died c.1392), English Member of Parliament
- Nicholas Fastolf (??? - 1330), English judge
- Thomas Fastolf (died 1361), English canon lawyer and Bishop of St Davids
