= Lord Protector =

Title in British constitutional law

Standard of Lord Protector Oliver Cromwell

Lord Protector (plural: Lords Protector) is a title that has been used in British constitutional law for the head of state. It was also a particular title for the British heads of state in respect to the established church. It was sometimes used to refer to holders of other temporary posts; for example, a regent acting for the absent monarch.

== Feudal royal regent ==
The title Lord Protector was originally used by royal princes or other nobles exercising a role as protector and defender of the realm, while also sitting (typically as chairman) on a regency council, governing for a monarch who was unable to do so (on account of minority, absence from the realm on Crusade, mental incapacity, etc.).

Notable cases in England:

- John of Lancaster, Duke of Bedford, and Humphrey, Duke of Gloucester, were (5 December 1422 – 6 November 1429) jointly Lords Protector for Henry VI (1421–1471);
- Richard Plantagenet, Duke of York, was three times (3 April 1454 – February 1455; 19 November 1455 – 25 February 1456; and 31 October – 30 December 1460) Lord Protector for Henry VI;
- Richard, Duke of Gloucester, was "Lord Protector of the Realm" (10 May 1483 – 26 June 1483) during the nominal reign of Edward V (one of the Princes in the Tower) before being offered the throne as Richard III;
- Edward Seymour, Duke of Somerset, was Lord Protector (4 February 1547 – 11 October 1549) during the early years of the reign of the young Edward VI;

and in Scotland:

- John Stewart, Duke of Albany, was "Governor and Protector of the Realm" (12 July 1515 – 16 November 1524) for James V of Scotland (1512–1542);
- James Hamilton, Duke of Châtellerault, was "Governor and Protector of the Kingdom" (3 January 1543 – 12 April 1554) for Mary, Queen of Scots.

== Cromwellian Commonwealth ==
Lord Protector of England, Scotland and Ireland
- Coat of arms

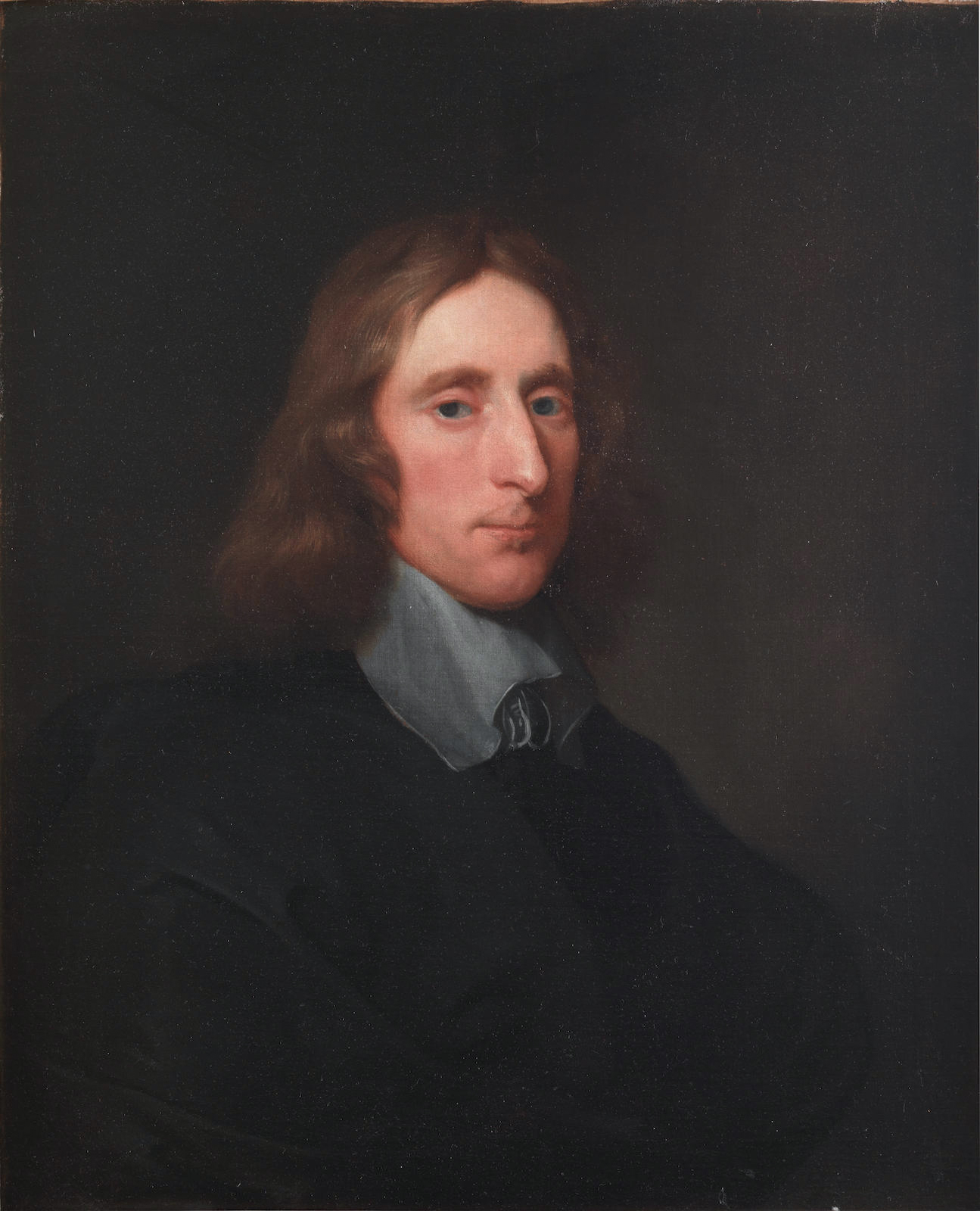
- Last holder: Richard Cromwell (3 September 1658 – 25 May 1659)
- Style: His Highness
- Residence: Palace of Whitehall
- Appointer: Elective
- Formation: 16 December 1653
- First holder: Oliver Cromwell
- Final holder: Richard Cromwell
- Abolished: 25 May 1659

The Lord Protector of the Commonwealth of England, Scotland and Ireland was the title of the head of state and head of government during the Commonwealth (often called the Interregnum), following the first period when a Council of State held executive power. The title was held by Oliver Cromwell (December 1653 – September 1658) and subsequently his son and designated successor Richard Cromwell (September 1658 – May 1659) during what is now known as The Protectorate.

The 1653 Instrument of Government (republican constitution) stated:

Oliver Cromwell, Captain-General of the forces of England, Scotland and Ireland, shall be, and is hereby declared to be, Lord Protector of the Commonwealth of England, Scotland and Ireland, and the dominions thereto belonging, for his life.

The replacement constitution of 1657, the Humble Petition and Advice, gave "His Highness the Lord Protector" the power to nominate his successor. Cromwell chose his eldest surviving son, the politically inexperienced Richard. That was a non-representative and de facto dynastic mode of succession, with royal connotations in both styles awarded (even a double invocation 16 December 1653 – 3 September 1658 "By the Grace of God and Republic Lord Protector of England, Scotland and Ireland") and many other monarchic prerogatives, such as that of awarding knighthoods.

Richard Cromwell, who succeeded after his father's death in September 1658, held the position for only eight months before he resigned in May 1659. He was followed by the second period of Commonwealth rule until the Restoration of the exiled heir to the Stuart throne, Charles II, in May 1660.

=== Lords Protector (1653–1659) ===
Lord Protector	Lifespan	Term began	Term ended
Oliver Cromwell	25 April 1599 – 3 September 1658 (aged 59)	16 December 1653	3 September 1658 (Died)
Richard Cromwell	4 October 1626 – 12 July 1712 (aged 85)	3 September 1658	25 May 1659 (Resigned)

== Post-Cromwell ==
Since the Restoration the title has not been used in either of the above manners. George, Prince of Wales, appointed to the regency in 1811, was referred to as "His Royal Highness the Prince Regent". George exercised the powers of the monarchy, just as Lords Protector had, but the title's republican associations had rendered it distasteful.

== Protector of the church ==
"Lord Protector" has also been used as a rendering of Latin Advocatus in the sense of a temporal Lord (such as a monarch) who acted as the protector of the mainly secular interests of a part of the church; compare the French title of vidame.

== In fiction ==
In the novel The Last Man by Mary Shelley, Britain becomes a republic with its elected head of state styled as Lord Protector. The title is held by Lord Raymond, and Ryland. In the 1987 television series The New Statesman's finale episode, "The Irresistible Rise of Alan B'Stard", after B'Stard's New Patriotic Party wins a landslide majority in a special general election called over British membership of the European Economic Community but with himself not having contested a seat, he briefly considered adopting the title of Lord Protector before being permitted to serve as an extra-parliamentary prime minister. In the 2008 film adaptation of C. S. Lewis' children's novel Prince Caspian, the antagonist Miraz begins as Lord Protector of Narnia before being proclaimed King (a change from the novel). In the 2020 film Wolfwalkers the Lord Protector serves as its primary antagonist.
