= R. L. Storey =

Robin Lyndsey Storey (1927 – 4 July 2005), usually cited as R. L. Storey, was an English historian specialising in late medieval English political and church history.

== Early years ==
Robin Storey was born in 1927 in Northumberland and educated at Whitley Bay Grammar School. He did National Service at the close of World War II in the RAF, which took him to the Netherlands. He studied Modern History at New College, Oxford and from 1948, moved to the University of Durham to carry out doctoral research into the career of Thomas Langley, Bishop of Durham as both 'statesman and bishop,' which was submitted in January 1954. At Durham he was a member of St Cuthbert's Society.

== Career ==
In 1953, Robin Storey joined the Public Record Office in Chancery Lane, London, as an assistant Keeper; it was there that he met his future wife. His employment provided him with the opportunity for research that would later form the basis of his studies of the Wardens of the Scottish Marches and the last years of the House of Lancaster, partly at least on the suggestion of his colleagues. This research was eventually published in 1966 as The End of The House of Lancaster by Manchester University Press. In this, Storey proposed that the fall of the Lancastrian regime, and the beginning of the Wars of the Roses were to be found in 'the compulsions of bastard feudalism', and, in Stores' own words, ''the escalation of private feuds' by the nobility. By 1962 he had joined the University of Nottingham, where he would stay for the next 28 years, finally retiring as Professor of English Medieval History. Notably, he was concurrently both Dean of his department and chair of his AUT branch.

== Support for local historical societies ==
Storey was both treasurer (1958–1965) and general editor (1969–79 and 1994–2003) of the Canterbury and York Society, as well as a councillor for the Royal Historical Society, the Thoroton Society, and the Lincoln Record Society. Having joined the Cumberland and Westmorland Antiquarian and Archaeological Society the year he moved to London, writing for them frequently, particularly on the ecclesiastical institutions and law and order issues of the fifteenth century North West England., as well as for other societies further afield.

== Publications ==
=== Books ===
- The Register of Thomas Langley bishop of Durham 1406–1437 4 vols, (Durham, 1956–61)
- The End of the House of Lancaster (Manchester, 1966)
- The Reign of Henry VII (Blandford, 1968)
- The Register of Gilbert Welton, Bishop of Carlisle 1353–1362 (Woodbridge, 1999)
- The Register of Thomas Appleby, Bishop of Carlisle: 1363–1395 (Woodbridge, 2006)

=== Articles ===
- "Marmaduke Lumley, Bishop of Carlisle, 1430–1450', Transactions of the Cumberland and Westmorland Antiquarian and Archaeological Society, NS 55 (1955), 112–31 doi:10.5284/1062604
- "The Wardens of the Marches of England towards Scotland, 1377–1489", English Historical Review, 72 (1957), 593–615
- "Episcopal King Makers in the Fifteenth Century", in Dobson, R. (ed.), The Church, Politics and Patronage in the Fifteenth Century, pp. 82–98
- "The universities during the Wars of the Roses", in Williams, D. (ed.), England in the Fifteenth Century (Woodbridge, 1987), pp. 315–327
- "The First Convocation, 1257?", in P. R. Coss and S. Lloyd (eds), Thirteenth Century England III (Woodbridge, 1991)
