= Parliament of Devils =

English parliament of 1459

The Parliament of Devils was an English Parliament held at Coventry in the Benedictine Priory of St. Mary's. The primary reason for calling the Parliament was to pass bills of attainder for high treason against Yorkist nobles following the Battle of Ludford Bridge.

This was the 21st parliament summoned in the reign of King Henry VI of England. It was summoned on 9 October 1459 for its first meeting on 20 November 1459, where Sir Thomas Tresham, knight of the shire for Northamptonshire, was elected Speaker of the House of Commons. The prominent figures condemned at this parliament were Richard Plantagenet, 3rd Duke of York, who was not invited to Parliament, his sons Edward, Earl of March (the future King Edward IV) and Edmund, Earl of Rutland, as well as Richard Neville, 5th Earl of Salisbury, and his son, Richard Neville, 16th Earl of Warwick.

The parliament was dissolved on 20 December 1459.
