= Ralph Percy =

English noble (1425–1464)

Sir Ralph Percy (11 August 1425 – 25 April 1464) was an English nobleman of the House of Percy, a knight, a Governor of Bamburgh Castle and a supporter of the Lancastrian faction in the Wars of the Roses. Percy was the son of Henry Percy, 2nd Earl of Northumberland and Lady Eleanor Neville, and the grandson of Sir Henry "Hotspur" Percy.

== Family ==
Percy married, firstly, Eleanor Acton and they had six children:

1. Sir Ralph Percy
2. Peter Percy
3. Sir Henry Percy
4. George Percy
5. John Percy
6. Margaret Percy

Sir Ralph married, secondly Jane Teye. They had a child, Catherine Percy.

== Career ==
Ralph was born on 11 August 1425 to Henry Percy, 2nd Earl of Northumberland and Eleanor Neville, Countess of Northumberland. He had three brothers, Henry, Thomas and Richard. Ralph, Thomas and Richard participated in the Percy-Neville feud, fighting at Stamford Bridge, where he and Thomas were taken prisoner in 1454. He was freed after Henry VI regained his sanity and the Duke of York dismissed as protector.

His father Henry was killed at the First Battle of St Albans in 1455. Four years later the Yorkists were charged with treason, and they fled, following the Rout of Ludford Bridge. However, when the Yorkists returned, Thomas was killed at the Battle of Northampton. Queen Margaret raised an army for the Lancastrian cause in the north, and the Percies joined her. Following victories at the Battle of Worksop and the Battle of Wakefield, where the enemy leader Richard of York was killed, and a victory at the Second Battle of St Albans, the Lancastrian cause was on the rise, but, at the disastrous Battle of Towton, his brothers were killed and he went into exile.

During 1462 and 1463, the Lancastrians attempted to destabilise the kingdom, which was ruled by their Yorkist enemy, Edward IV. These attempts were concentrated in the north of England and directed by the Lancastrian Queen, Margaret of Anjou (Henry VI's wife).

The Earl of Warwick led campaigns to neutralise the Lancastrians in the north in the early 1460s. As a result, Sir Ralph Percy surrendered Bamburgh Castle to Edward IV, on Christmas Eve 1462 in return for a free pardon. Sir Ralph swore allegiance to Edward IV who, in a policy of conciliation, returned Percy's lands, and control of both Bamburgh and Dunstanburgh Castles, to him.

Fighting in the north continued, exacerbated by a Scottish invasion led by James III, Margaret of Anjou and Henry VI in 1463. When the Scots sued for peace, Lord Montague was sent to arrange terms. On 25 April 1464, Montague was on his way to Norham. Percy and the Duke of Somerset (who had surrendered and sworn allegiance with Percy), forswearing their oaths, attacked Montague with 5,000 men. The site of that battle was Hedgeley Moor, seven miles south of Wooler. Percy led Somerset's vanguard and was killed.

== Ancestry ==
Ancestors of Ralph Percy

16. Henry de Percy, 3rd Baron Percy son of 26 and 27
8. Henry Percy, 1st Earl of Northumberland
17. Mary of Lancaster
4. Henry Hotspur Percy
18. Ralph Neville, 2nd Baron Neville de Raby
9. Lady Margaret Neville
19. Alice Audley
2. Henry Percy, 2nd Earl of Northumberland
20. Roger Mortimer, 2nd Earl of March
10. Edmund Mortimer, 3rd Earl of March
21. Lady Philippa Montagu
5. Lady Elizabeth Mortimer
22. Lionel of Antwerp, 1st Duke of Clarence son of 28 and 29
11. Philippa Plantagenet, 5th Countess of Ulster
23. Elizabeth de Burgh, 4th Countess of Ulster
1. Sir Ralph Percy
24. Ralph Neville, 2nd Baron Neville de Raby = 18
12. John Neville, 3rd Baron Neville de Raby
25. Alice Audley = 19
6. Ralph de Neville, 1st Earl of Westmorland
26. Henry de Percy, 2nd Baron Percy
13. Lady Maud Percy
27. Idoine de Clifford
3. Lady Eleanor Neville
28. Edward III of England
14. John of Gaunt, 1st Duke of Lancaster
29. Philippa of Hainault
7. Lady Joan Beaufort
30. Payne de Roet
15. Katherine Swynford
