= Lady Margaret Percy =

15th-century English noblewoman

Lady Margaret Gascoigne (née Percy) (born c. 1447) was an English noblewoman, the daughter of Henry Percy, 3rd Earl of Northumberland and Eleanor Poynings.

== Family ==
She married Sir William Gascoigne (V) (c. 1450 – 1486), son of Sir William Gascoigne (IV) (c. 1427 – c. 1463) and Joan Neville (c. 1436–1464).

The couple had the following children:

- Sir William Gascoigne VI: married firstly Alice Frognall and secondly Margaret Neville, daughter of Richard Neville, 2nd Baron Latimer of Snape. Had issue by both marriages.
- Elizabeth (1470–1559): married before April 1493 as his second wife Sir George Tailboys (c. 1467 – 1538), de jure 9th Baron Kyme and Sheriff of Lincolnshire.
- Anne or Agnes (c. 1474 – 1504): married firstly Sir Thomas Fairfax (c. 1475 – 1520). She had twin sons: Nicholas and William. Married secondly Ralph Neville, of Thornton Bridge.
- Dorothy (c. 1475 – 1527): married Sir Ninian Markenfield (died 1527).
- Margaret (d. July 1515): married Ralph Ogle, 3rd Baron Ogle (7 November 1468 – 16 January 1512/1513).

== Descendants ==
Through her daughter Elizabeth, Percy is an ancestor of actresses Dakota Fanning and Elle Fanning.

== Ancestry ==
Ancestors of Lady Margaret Percy

8. Henry 'Hotspur' Percy
4. Henry Percy, 2nd Earl of Northumberland
9. Elizabeth Mortimer
2. Henry Percy, 3rd Earl of Northumberland
10. Ralph de Neville, 1st Earl of Westmorland
5. Eleanor Neville
11. Joan Beaufort
1. Margaret Percy
12. Robert Poynings, 4th Baron Poynings
6. Sir Richard Poynings
13. Isabella Grey
3. Eleanor Poynings, 5th Baroness Poynings
14. Sir John Berkeley
7. Alianore Berkeley
15. Elizabeth Betteshorne
