= Percy–Neville feud =

15th-century skirmishes in northern England

The Percy–Neville feud was a series of skirmishes, raids, and vandalism between two prominent northern English families, the House of Percy and the House of Neville, and their followers, that helped provoke the Wars of the Roses. The original reason for the long dispute is unknown, and the first outbreaks of violence were in the 1450s, prior to the Wars of the Roses. The antagonists would later meet in battle several times during the feud.

== Origins and context ==
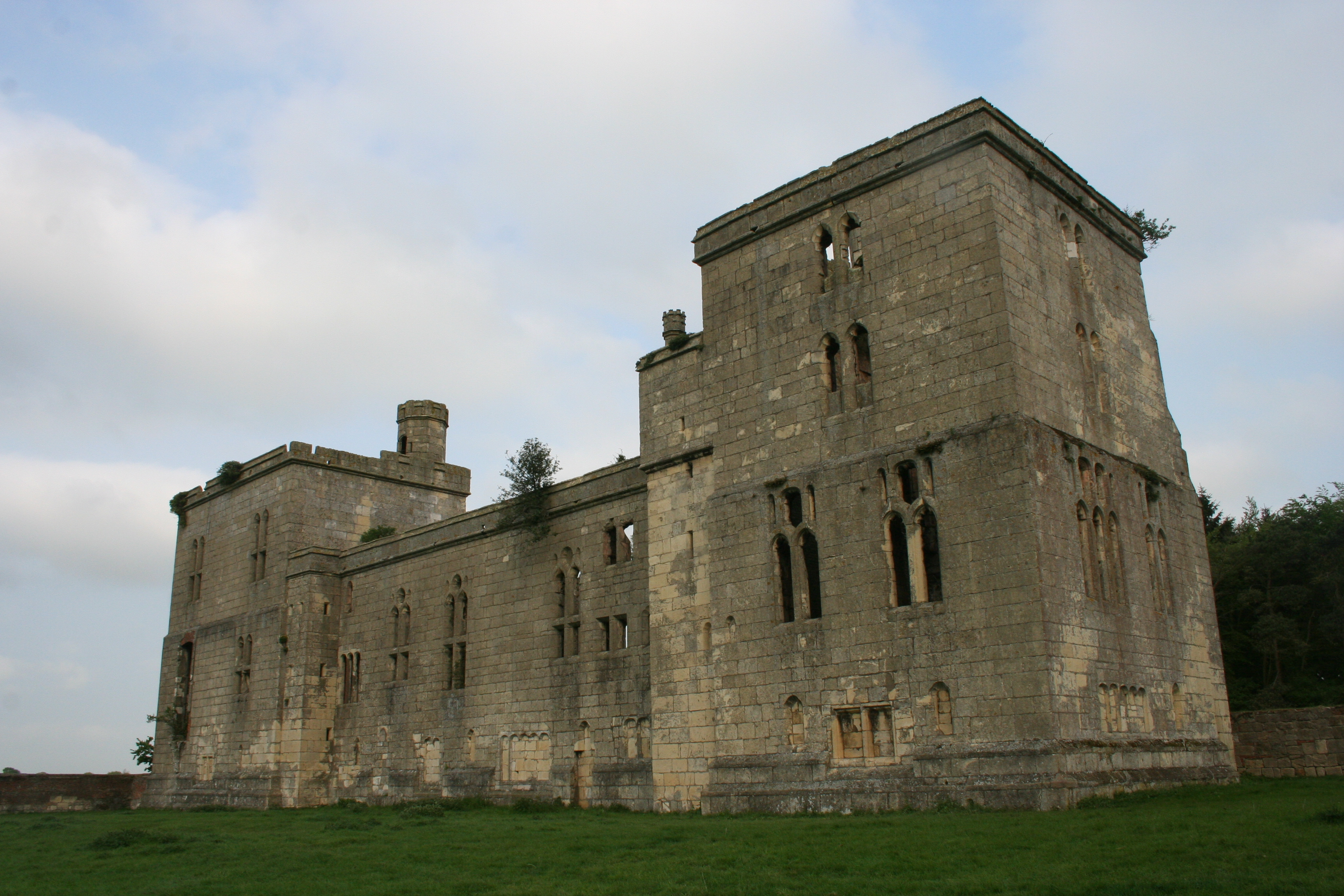
Wressle Castle in 2009: Forfeited by the Percys, it is possible they feared its loss to the Nevilles.

Yorkshire's three ridings were divided among the crown (as Duke of Lancaster), the Percy family, Richard, 3rd Duke of York, and Richard Neville, 5th Earl of Salisbury. King Henry VI and the Duke of York do not seem to have visited Yorkshire very often, which Ralph Griffiths suggests meant that any tension would be solely between Percy and Neville. Since the city of York was the most important, the capital city of the north, it 'provided a focus for their rivalries'. It is not, he said, a coincidence that 'the two virtual battles between Percy and Neville in 1453 and 1454 were fought close to the city's walls'. He also suggests that Percy tenants may have been as anti-Neville as their lords, since their estates were contiguous, this could have encouraged rivalry and bred antagonism. As A. J. Pollard has pointed out, Neville retained some of his knights from 'deep in Percy country, particularly southern Northumberland'.

Griffiths has suggested that by the mid-15th century, relations between Percy and Neville were 'poisoned by jealousy and resentment'. He has pointed out that Salisbury probably did not expect — and not receive — the assistance of the Raby branch of his family (by his father's first wife, Margaret de Stafford), which he puts down to the previous feud between the two branches of the family, over the division of Westmorland's will. Robin Storey has also pointed out how Northumberland seems to have been receiving less royal favour than Salisbury. He points out that when trouble came, it was to be the earls' sons, not the lords, that would start it. The degree to which the two earls were assisting and encouraging the feud behind the scenes has also been questioned. Griffiths has said that Thomas and John were Salisbury's direct representatives in it.

== Immediate causes for the feud ==
Various immediate causes have been ascribed to causing the outbreak of violence in 1454. Professor Griffiths has suggested that Lord Cromwell's manor of Wressle, Yorkshire, was seized by the Percys following the joining of the Cromwell and Neville families in marriage in 1453 (see below), and that Cromwell viewed the Nevilles as allies against the Percys. Likewise, Warwick's feud with Somerset in south Glamorgan may have driven him into an alliance with the Duke of York against him. Griffiths also suggests that the single most important event to precipitate the feud was the marriage of Salisbury's second son, Thomas Neville to Maud Stanhope, the widow of Robert, Lord Willoughby. Not only, says Griffiths, was any further aggrandisement for Salisbury's family anathema to the Percys, but the new Cromwell connection gave the Nevilles access to the ex-Percy manors of Wressle and Burwell, two-thirds of which had each been granted to Cromwell for life in February 1438, together with the reversion of the remainder. This grant was then converted into one in fee simple two years later, further reducing the likelihood of the Percys reclaiming it. Griffiths has calculated Burwell to have been worth an income of c. £38 10s 6d per annum in 1456. These manors had been forfeited in 1403 by the first earl of Northumberland after the failure of the Percy Rebellion against Henry IV, and Cromwell's holding them in fee-simple meant they were available to him to grant away to whomever he liked.

== Skirmish at Heworth Moor ==
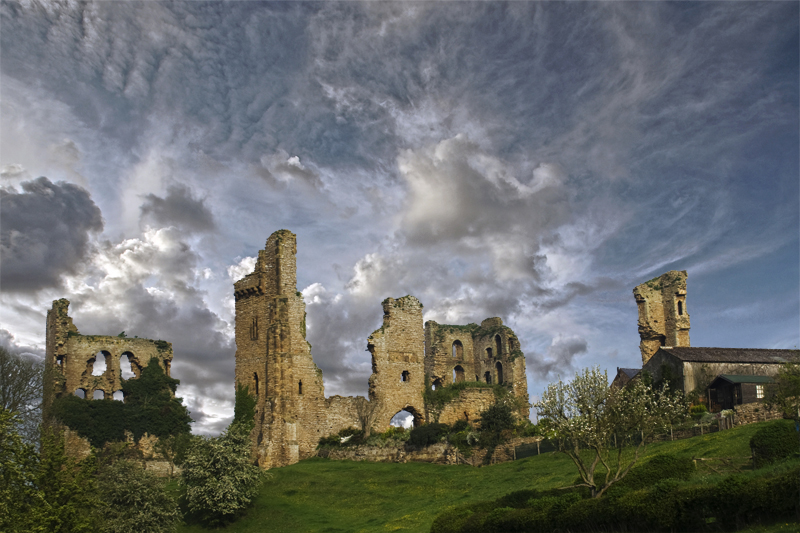
The earl of Salisbury's castle at Sheriff Hutton today

This, the first actual confrontation (and 'most serious incident to date') between the two families, in response to the marriage of Thomas Neville and Maud, a marriage which Griffiths has said must have been 'obnoxious' to the Percys, and particularly Thomas Percy, 1st Baron Egremont. This clash, on 24 August 1453, has been described as having the intention of 'the destruction of the entire Neville party' on the latter's way to the Neville stronghold of Sheriff Hutton Castle; it is, says Griffiths 'unclear' as to whether the Earl of Northumberland was party to Egremont's plans. Since only five members of the wedding party are ever named as being present by contemporary chroniclers, it is impossible to assess the strength of their force—Griffiths suggests 'their retinue must have been impressive.' It has been suggested that the earl of Salisbury was personally targeted for attack by one Sir William Buckton, due to the fact that at the later indictments, his name was individually recorded as being contra comite Sarum in campo ('against the earl of Salisbury in the field').

The prospect of Percy manors passing to the Neville family was too much for Lord Egremont, who spent days fiercely recruiting in York and ambushed the Nevilles on their way home to Sheriff Hutton. He no doubt intended to assassinate the Nevilles, but all of the family were there with their own retinues, so they probably had a larger force than Egremont expected (as earls, Salisbury and Warwick were entitled to at least a hundred soldiers each in their retinues).

Still, the Percy force was almost certainly larger in size (though 710 names have been preserved, they probably numbered over a thousand). Mutual fear of fighting a pitched battle meant there was little if any bloodshed, and the Nevilles were able to retreat swiftly to their stronghold in Sheriff Hutton. There is an alternative view; the evidence for this is found on legal rolls and nowhere else. As not a soul is recorded as being injured in the skirmish, it is possible that the Nevilles used this incitement of violence as an excuse, an early example of a legal fiction, to take the matter to the royal courts, resolving the legal case and thereby stating whose land this skirmish took place on. This view has been suggested after studying the King's Bench lists (now withdrawn from the public), where a number of skirmishes such as this are recorded but the only injuries or casualties found are a hen and occasionally a dog.

== Incidents and chronology ==
20 Oct 1453: The leaders of both Neville and Percy forces—Thomas and John Neville for the former, Egremont and Sir Richard Percy for the latter—converged respectively on their castles of Topcliffe and Sand Hutton in the North Riding. Significantly, they were, for the first time, accompanied by their fathers and elder brothers—Salisbury and Richard, Earl of Warwick accompanied John and Thomas, whilst the Percy brothers were with Northumberland and his elder brother Henry, Lord Poynings. However, the result of this near-confrontation appears to be unrecorded, says Griffiths.

Griffiths has suggested that the conflict intensified after Christmas 1453, compared to the first few months.

6 May 1454: Salisbury's house in York was broken into and his tenants attacked. Those who took part in this attack had mostly been with Egremont at Heworth. These men were also responsible for the sacking of Skipwith's York house a week later.

== Crown intervention ==
On 12 July 1453, the king and council announced a commission of Oyer and Terminer, which was headed by the earls of Salisbury and Northumberland themselves. This was however, reformed two weeks later; Griffiths has speculated that this was probably because not only was it not big enough to deal with such a serious collapse in law and order, but also the commissioners themselves 'were not very effective.' Another weakness of this commission, he suggests, is the fact that it was composed with a number of Neville retainers; thus displaying a clear partisanship which would have been obvious to the Percys, and further reduce their faith in the crown's ability—or desire—to achieve a fair settlement.

By 27 July, says Griffiths, the situation in the north had deteriorated so badly that the crown effectively abrogated its authority in the region, by writing directly to the two earls, laying responsibility for ending the dispute on them, and instructing them to keep their sons in order. It was at this point too, that the commission of Oyer and Terminer of 12 July was reissued; this time, without the presence of the earls, and with a much larger number of lawyers, 328 members included. The reissued commission was composed of Sir William Lucy of Northamptonshire, Peter Arden, John Portyngton, and Robert Danby, the latter three being lawyers and the former an uninvolved knight (who would later become High Sheriff of Warwickshire and Leicestershire). The commission also expanded geographically into Northumberland, Cumberland, Westmorland, 'and Yorkshire generally,' as opposed to the narrow remit of just York and environs as had the first one. Griffiths points to the fact that it actually found against at least four of John Neville's 'principle accomplices'- Sir John Conyers, Sir James Pickering, and Sirs Randolph and Thomas Mountford. The crown continued to write to the involved parties. On 8 October 1453, the council wrote to the earl of Westmorland and congratulated him on not assisting the Middleham branch. It also wrote again to Salisbury and Northumberland, 'more in sorrow than in anger,' as Griffiths has phrased it, exhorting them to remember their positions of Commissioners of the Peace and also as members of the king's council. At the same time, Parliament demanded that the nobility resolve their problems peaceably rather than in force. However, the king's letters 'concluded wearily' that both of them kept raising armed forces in spite of the appeals from king and parliament. Similar letters were sent to their involved younger sons using stronger terms, warning them that they could eventually suffer forfeiture. Griffiths has suggested that the crown was constrained in its attempts to suppress the law breaking because by now, the king had become incapacitated, and the council ruling in his stead were ill-able to afford alienating fellow magnates whose support might be required in government.

== Open warfare ==
In retaliation, Sir John Neville raided the absent Earl of Northumberland's house at Catton, in Yorkshire, and all but ruined it. The next day, Richard Percy attacked a house on Neville property.

The danger of civil war was intensified when both sides began summoning their retainers to strongholds in the north. On 20 October, the Percy clan had gathered 10,000 men at Topcliffe. Only four miles away, the Neville force was stationed at Sheriff Hutton. After several threats from the king, both sides reached a truce and disbanded their men. However, one chronicler said, "There was no reconciliation, the day of reckoning had merely been postponed."

Despite these precautions, it is probable that a few hundred men clashed at Stamford Bridge on 31 October or 1 November 1454, resulting in hundreds dead and more wounded. Lord Egremont was then captured and imprisoned by John Neville.

== York's protectorate ==
Michael Hicks has described the roots of the Neville's alliance with Richard, Duke of York in 1453 as being based on their having 'common enemies' (for instance, the king's chief minister, Edmund Beaufort, 1st Duke of Somerset) and that this association was significant enough to be 'a coalition of national significance.' Griffiths notes that the parliament of 1453 failed to achieve any accord in the north, and that following the mental collapse of the king, York was made protector and Salisbury Chancellor; this, Griffiths suggests, presented Salisbury with an opportunity for revenge- which the earl took. Salisbury was now in an official position to write to Egremont and his father much more threateningly than the council had attempted the previous year. Northumberland was ordered to appear before the council by 12 June 1454, and his sons on 2 June.

== Rebellion of the Duke of Exeter ==
During York's Protectorate, Somerset was imprisoned, and the Percys suffered greatly at the hands of the Nevilles. When the king recovered from his illness, York was relieved of power, and Somerset was released and was quick to ally himself with the Percys.

Six months later, Henry VI, Somerset and the Percys (the Lancastrians) met the Duke of York and the Nevilles (the Yorkists) in the First Battle of St Albans, where the Duke of Somerset and the Earl of Northumberland were slain.

== Battle of Stamford Bridge ==
Stamford Bridge, one of the earl of Salisbury's manors, was on the old Roman Road east of York. On 31 October 1454 (or, according to some accounts, 1 or 2 November) Egremont, and a short while later Richard Percy were captured by Sir Thomas Neville. Griffith's account describes there being hundreds killed and many wounded. It is likely that the Neville victory was made possible by the (to the Percys) treasonous flight of Peter Lound, the bailiff of their Pocklington manor, which was approximately two miles south of Stamford Bridge. The two Percy brothers were taken to Middleham Castle and then transferred to the duke of York's custody.

== Aftermath and consequences ==
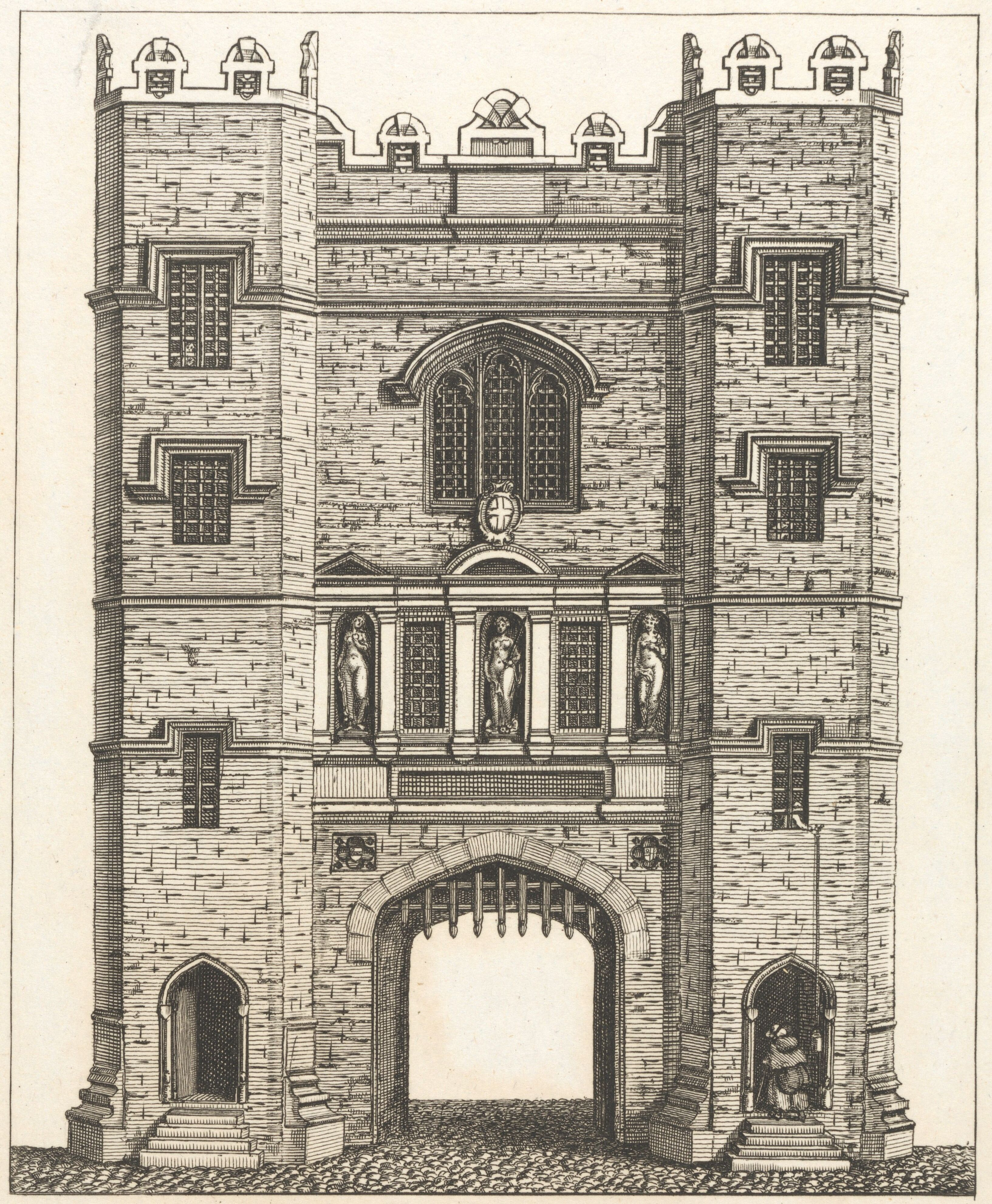
The medieval prison of Newgate, where the Percy brothers were imprisoned and whence they escaped two years later.

Following their defeat at Stamford Bridge, the Percy brothers were arraigned before a commission of Oyer and Terminer at York. This commission bound them over for massive sums; 8,000 marks payable to Salisbury, and including fines towards his countess and sons, to a total of 16,800 marks; Griffiths describes this as Salisbury's 'reckoning' of all the damage caused to his estates during the course of the feud. Griffiths has summarised the financial bonds that were intended to hold the peace together. Salisbury entered into a bond with the king for 12,000 marks on behalf of his sons Thomas and John (for being the principal Neville players). Conversely, Northumberland and his mother bound themselves for the same amount, 'for all offences' against York and the Nevilles. Salisbury also agreed that Lord Egremont was to be released from the 16,800 mark bond he had been punished with in November 1454, and would also desist from taking any action against the Newgate sheriffs responsible for Egremont's escape. Egremont himself was then obligated in bond for 4,000 marks. This would have to be paid to Salisbury if he broke the peace towards the earl and his family for the next ten years. As Griffiths put, with these bonds, it was intended that 'the slate was wiped clean.'
