= Richard Grey, 3rd Earl of Kent =

English peer

Richard Grey
- 3rd Earl of Kent
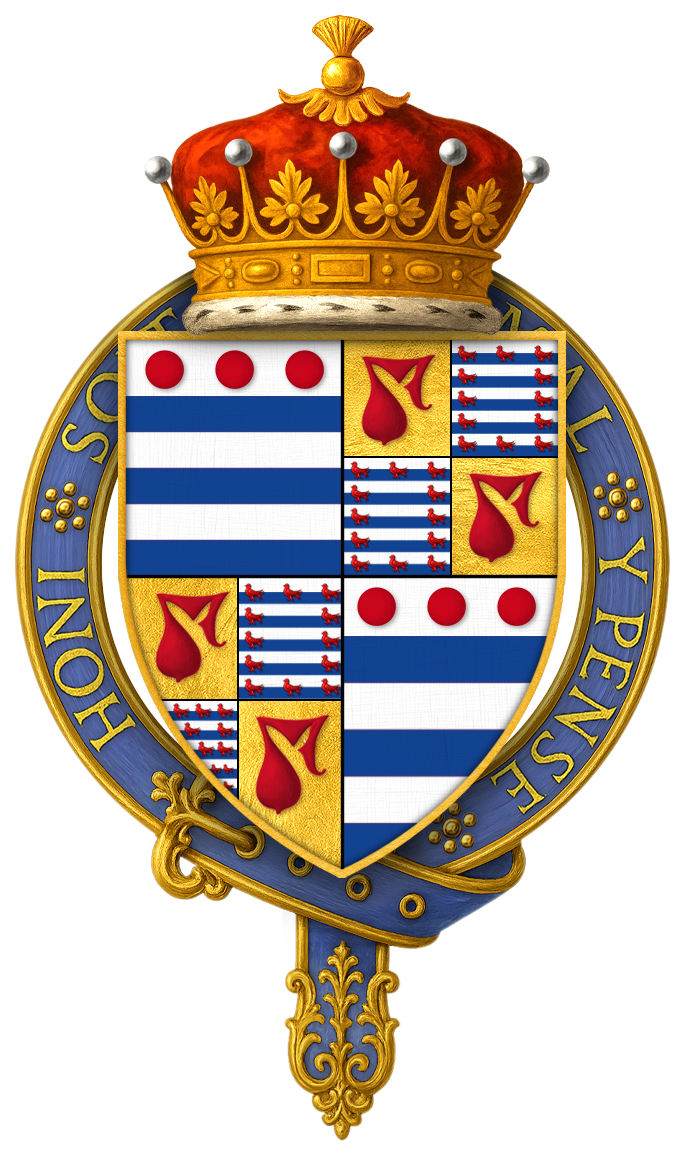
- Arms of Sir Richard Grey, 3rd Earl of Kent, KG
- Born: 1481
- Died: 3 May 1524 (aged 42–43)
- Spouses: Elizabeth Hussey; Margaret Fynche
- Father: George Grey, 2nd Earl of Kent
- Mother: Anne Woodville

Richard Grey, 3rd Earl of Kent KG (1481 – 3 May 1524) was an English peer.

== Family ==
He was a son of George Grey, 2nd Earl of Kent and his first wife Anne Woodville. His paternal grandparents were Edmund Grey, 1st Earl of Kent and Katherine Percy, Countess of Kent. His maternal grandparents were Richard Woodville, 1st Earl Rivers and Jacquetta of Luxembourg.

His father was secondly married to Catherine Herbert. His paternal half-siblings included Henry Grey, 4th Earl of Kent and Anne Grey, Baroness Hussey. His mother was previously married to William Bourchier, Viscount Bourchier. His maternal half-siblings included Henry Bourchier, 2nd Earl of Essex and Cecily Bourchier. Cecily was mother to Walter Devereux, 1st Viscount Hereford.

== Marriages ==
Richard married twice. His first wife was Elizabeth Hussey. She was a daughter of Sir William Hussey and Elizabeth Berkeley. Her father had served as Attorney General for England and Wales from 16 June 1471 to 7 May 1481 and Lord Chief Justice of England and Wales from 7 May 1481 to his death on 24 November 1495. Richard's half-sister, from his fathers second marriage to Catherine Herbert married Elizabeth Hussey's brother, John Hussey, 1st Baron Hussey of Sleaford.

His second wife was Margaret Dawes (née Fynche, formerly Curteys), daughter of James Fynche and the widow of a London alderman. There were no known children from either marriage.

== Life ==
He served as a Justice of the Peace in Bedfordshire, Buckinghamshire and Huntingdonshire from 1504. He was created a Knight of the Garter in 1505, alongside the latter Henry Stafford, 1st Earl of Wiltshire. He was Captain of the Army in France in 1513 and 1514 and accompanied Henry VIII to his meeting with Francis I of France at the Field of the Cloth of Gold in 1520.

Richard wound up heavily in debt, probably through gambling, and was forced to alienate most of his property. A good part of his lands in Bedfordshire ended up in the hands of his affine cousin (Richard's mother was the sister of Elizabeth Woodville, Henry's mother-in-law), King Henry VII (including the Marcher Lordship of Ruthin, which he sold directly to the King); historians disagree regarding what this says about the relationship of King Henry with the aristocracy.

He was also fined 2500 marks for abducting Elizabeth Trussell, whose wardship the second earl had left to Richard's half-brother Henry and then failed to keep up the instalments laid down for the payment of the fine.

He died at his house in Lombard Street, London, and was buried at Whitefriars, London. Richard was childless and was succeeded as earl by his half-brother Henry Grey. Henry tried, with little success, to reacquire the property Richard had sold, and had to live as a modest gentleman, never formally taking title as earl.

== Notes ==
Peerage of England
Preceded by George Grey	Earl of Kent; 1505–1524	Succeeded by Henry Grey
