= George Grey, 2nd Earl of Kent =

English nobleman and soldier

George Grey, 2nd Earl of Kent KB JP PC
- Born: 1454
- Died: 25 December 1505 (aged 50–51); Ampthill, Bedfordshire, England
- Spouse(s): Anne Woodville (d. 1489); Catherine Herbert
- Children: 5, including Richard, Anne and Henry
- Parents: Edmund Grey (father); Katherine Percy (mother)
- Relatives: John Grey (grandfather); Henry Percy (grandfather); Eleanor Neville (grandmother)

George Grey, 2nd Earl of Kent, KB JP PC (1454 – 25 December 1505) was the son of Edmund Grey, 1st Earl of Kent and Lady Katherine Percy. He was the Second Earl of Kent from 1490 to 1505.

== Biography ==
George Grey, 2nd Earl of Kent and 5th Baron Grey de Ruthyn, was the second son of the 1st Earl, his elder brother having died in 1480. He was made a Knight of the Bath by King Richard III in July 1483. He was a Justice of the Peace for Huntingdonshire from 1480, for Northamptonshire from 1480 and for Bedfordshire from 1483, for Buckinghamshire from 1494 and for Kent from 1496.

Grey fought for Henry VII against the Yorkist pretender Lambert Simnel at the Battle of Stoke Field on 16 June 1487. In 1491 he was a commissioner to raise money in Bedfordshire for a war against France. On 17 June 1497, he again fought in a royal army when it defeated Cornish rebels at the Battle of Deptford Bridge (also known as the Battle of Blackheath).

Grey died at Ampthill in December 1505. Earlier that year he had attended court on the visit of King Philip I of Castile (1504–1506) A letter from William Makefyr to Robert D'arcy and Giles Alington of 17 January 1506 reads [CRT190/45]: "The Earl of Kent was mounted on a sorrelled horse, harness of Venice gold with a deep fringe half a yard in length. My Lord of Kent's Coat was one bar of Gold Cloth and another crimson Velvet with a demi-mache cut off by the elbow…a true soldier too, and a favourite of Henry but survived this pageant a very short time, dying within the year".

== Family ==
Grey married Anne (died 30 July 1489), daughter of Richard Woodville, 1st Earl Rivers, and Jacquetta of Luxembourg. They had a single son:

- Richard Grey, 3rd Earl of Kent (1481–1524).

Grey secondly married Catherine (died 1506), daughter of William Herbert, 1st Earl of Pembroke and Anne Devereux. They had four children:

- Lady Anne Grey (1490–1545). Married John Hussey, 1st Baron Hussey of Sleaford.
- Henry Grey, 4th Earl of Kent (c. 1495 – 1562).
- George Grey.
- Anthony Grey. Paternal grandfather of Anthony Grey, 9th Earl of Kent

== Notes ==
Peerage of England
Preceded by Edmund Grey	Earl of Kent; 1490–1505	Succeeded by Richard Grey
