= Henry de Brumford =

Knight (1428–1471)

Henry de Brumford (c. 1428 – before 1471), was a knight who served under the command of Richard, Duke of York during the Wars of the Roses. He was noted for assisting the Duke of York personally in the First Battle of St. Albans. He continued to fight in France and died before 1471, possibly during battle.
