= The Boot, St Albans =

Pub in St Albans, Hertfordshire, England

Coordinates: 51°45′05″N 0°20′25″W

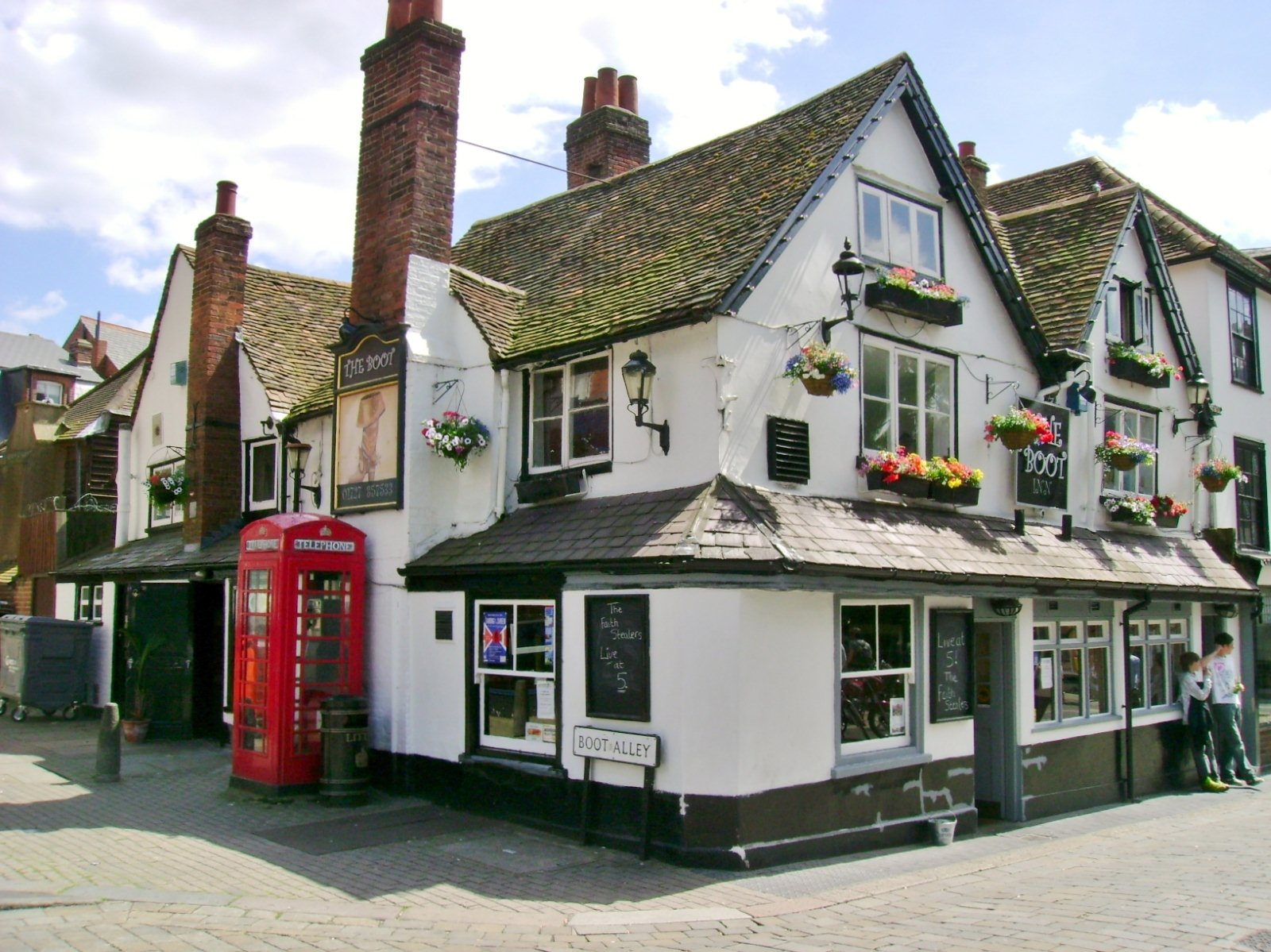
The Boot

The Boot is a public house in St Albans, Hertfordshire, UK. Located in the centre of the city, it is near the site of the First Battle of St Albans. According to St Albans Ghost Lore [Muriel Thresher and Beryl Carrington (1987) ISBN 0901194077 published by St Albans and Hertfordshire Archaeological Society], it was known as the Old Wellington pub formerly the Blue Boar .

== Architecture ==
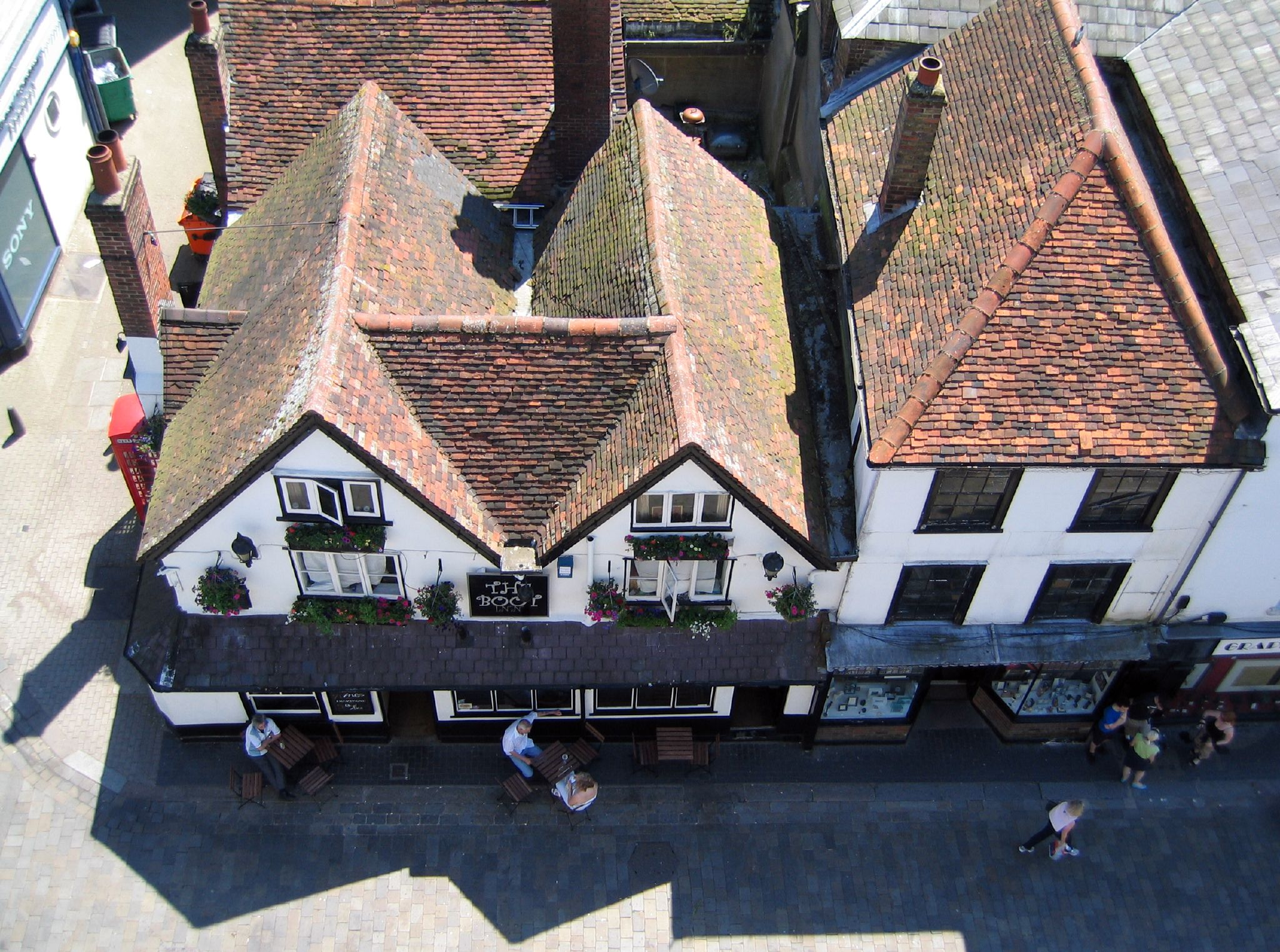
The Boot from above. Historic England describes the building having a "jumble of roofs".

The pub appears to consist of two separate buildings joined together. The building dates to around 1500, and is a grade II listed with Historic England.
