= Eleanor Neville, Countess of Northumberland =

English countess

Eleanor Neville
- Countess of Northumberland
- Born: c. 1398; Raby, Durham, England
- Died: 1472 (aged 73–74); Raby, Durham, England
- Noble family: Neville
- Spouses: Richard le Despenser, 4th Baron Burghersh; Henry Percy, 2nd Earl of Northumberland
- Issue: John Percy; Henry Percy, 3rd Earl of Northumberland; Thomas Percy, 1st Baron Egremont; Lady Katherine Percy; George Percy; Sir Ralph Percy; Sir Richard Percy; William Percy, Bishop of Carlisle; Anne Percy; Joan Percy
- Father: Ralph de Neville, 1st Earl of Westmorland
- Mother: Joan Beaufort, Countess of Westmorland

Eleanor Neville (c. 1398–1472) was the second daughter of Ralph de Neville, 1st Earl of Westmorland, by his second wife, Joan Beaufort, daughter of John of Gaunt, 1st Duke of Lancaster, and Katherine Swynford. Her second husband and four of her sons were all killed in battles during the Wars of the Roses.

== Marriage and children ==
Eleanor married firstly her second cousin Richard le Despenser, 4th Baron Burghersh, a grandson of John of Gaunt's younger brother Edmund of Langley, 1st Duke of York. He died aged 17, on 7 October 1414 and was buried in Tewkesbury Abbey.

After her first husband's early death without issue, Eleanor married secondly Henry Percy, 2nd Earl of Northumberland. He was killed at the First Battle of St Albans in 1455.

Eleanor and Henry had ten children:

- John Percy (b. 8 July 1418).
- Henry Percy, 3rd Earl of Northumberland (25 July 1421 – 29 March 1461, Battle of Towton).
- Thomas Percy, 1st Baron Egremont (29 November 1422, Leconfield, Yorkshire – 10 July 1460, Battle of Northampton, England).
- Lady Katherine Percy (28 May 1423 – d. aft 1475). She married Edmund Grey, 1st Earl of Kent.
- George Percy (24 July 1424 – 14 November 1474).
- Sir Ralph Percy (1425 – 25 April 1464, Battle of Hedgeley Moor).
- Sir Richard Percy (1426/7–29 March 1461, Battle of Towton).
- William Percy, Bishop of Carlisle (7 April 1428 – 26 April 1462).
- Joan Percy.
- Anne Percy. She was the second wife of William Fitzalan, 11th Earl of Arundel.

== Ancestry ==
Ancestors of Eleanor Neville, Countess of Northumberland

8. Ralph Neville, 2nd Baron Neville de Raby
4. John Neville, 3rd Baron Neville de Raby
9. Alice Audley
2. Ralph Neville, 1st Earl of Westmorland
10. Henry de Percy, 2nd Baron Percy of Alnwick
5. Maud Percy
11. Idonea Clifford
1. Eleanor Neville, Countess of Northumberland
12. Edward III of England
6. John of Gaunt, 1st Duke of Lancaster
13. Philippa of Hainault
3. Joan Beaufort
14. Sir Payne de Roet
7. Katherine Swynford

== Sources ==
- Amt, Emilie; Smith, Katherine Allen, eds. (2018). Medieval England, 500-1500: A Reader (2nd ed.). University of Toronto Press. ISBN 978-1-4426-3466-4.
- Ellis, Steven G. (2015). Defending English Ground: War and Peace in Meath and Northumberland, 1460-1542. Oxford University Press. ISBN 978-0-19-969629-1.
- Griffiths, Ralph A. (1981). The Reign of King Henry VI: The Exercise of Royal Authority, 1422–1461. University of California Press. ISBN 0-520-04372-3.
- Hicks, Michael (2010). The Wars of the Roses. Yale University Press. ISBN 978-0-300-18157-9.
