= Henry Percy, 2nd Earl of Northumberland =

English nobleman and military commander (1393–1455)

Henry Percy
- Earl of Northumberland
- Arms of Percy (modern), (Note: The ancient arms of Percy were: Azure, five fusils in fess or, both versions still quartered by the Percy Duke of Northumberland today) as seen on seal of Henry Percy: Or, a lion rampant azure (1&4); Gules, three lucies hauriant argent (2&3)
- Tenure: 11 May 1414 – 22 May 1455
- Predecessor: Henry Percy, 1st Earl
- Spouse: Eleanor Neville
- Issue among others: Henry Percy, 3rd Earl; Thomas, Baron Egremont; Lady Katherine Percy, Countess of Kent; Sir Ralph Percy; William, Bishop of Carlisle
- House: House of Percy
- Father: Henry "Hotspur" Percy
- Mother: Elizabeth Mortimer
- Other titles: 5th Baron Percy
- Known for: Involvement in the Wars of the Roses
- Years active: c. 1413–1455
- Born: 3 February 1393 (Note: Though the Dictionary of National Biography operates with the year 1394, other sources give his year of birth as 1393.); Alnwick Castle, Northumberland, England
- Died: 22 May 1455 (aged 62); First Battle of St Albans
- Cause of death: Killed in battle
- Buried: St Albans Abbey, Hertfordshire; 51.750556°N 0.342222°W
- Residence: Warkworth Castle
- Locality: Yorkshire, Northumberland, Cumberland
- Net worth: £3,100 gross in 1455
- Wars and battles: Anglo-Scottish Border Wars • Battle of Sark; Wars of the Roses • First Battle of St Albans
- Offices: Warden of the East March; Constable of England

Henry Percy, 2nd Earl of Northumberland (3 February 1393 – 22 May 1455) was an English nobleman and military commander in the lead up to the Wars of the Roses. He was the son of Henry "Hotspur" Percy, and the grandson of Henry Percy, 1st Earl of Northumberland. His father and grandfather were killed in different rebellions against Henry IV in 1403 and 1408, respectively, and the young Henry spent his minority in exile in Scotland. Only after the death of Henry IV in 1413 was he reconciled with the Crown, and in 1414 he was created Earl of Northumberland.

In the following years, Northumberland occasionally served with the king in France, but his main occupation was the protection of the border to Scotland. At the same time, a feud with the Neville family was developing, particularly with Richard Neville, Earl of Salisbury. This feud became entangled with the conflict between the Dukes of York and Somerset over control of national government. The conflict culminated in the first battle of the Wars of the Roses, at St Albans, where both Somerset and Northumberland were killed.

== Family background ==
Henry Percy was the son of Sir Henry "Hotspur" Percy, and Lady Elizabeth Mortimer. Elizabeth was the daughter of Edmund Mortimer, Earl of March and Philippa, Countess of Ulster, daughter of Elizabeth de Burgh and Lionel of Antwerp, son of Edward III. Hotspur's father—the young Henry's grandfather—was also called Henry Percy, and in 1377 became the first of the Percy family to hold the title of Earl of Northumberland.

Both Hotspur and his father were early and active supporters of Henry Bolingbroke, who usurped the throne from Richard II in 1399, and became King Henry IV. They were initially richly rewarded, but soon grew disillusioned with the new regime. Hotspur rose up in rebellion, and was killed at Shrewsbury on 21 July 1403.

Hotspur's father, the earl, was not present at the battle, but there is little doubt that he participated in the rebellion. After a short imprisonment, he was pardoned, and in June 1404 he delivered his grandson into the king's custody at Doncaster.

By May 1405, however, the earl was involved in another rebellion. His plans failed, and he was forced to flee to Scotland, taking his grandson with him. The following years were marked by an itinerant life and further plotting, while the young Henry remained in the custody of the Duke of Albany. On 19 February 1408, the first earl of Northumberland was killed in the Battle of Bramham Moor, leaving the young Henry Percy as heir apparent to the earldom.

Henry remained in Scotland until the accession of Henry V in 1413, when he tried to claim his grandfather's title. His cause was aided by the king's aunt, Joan Beaufort, Countess of Westmorland, who arranged his marriage to her daughter Eleanor.

It was in Henry V's interest to reconcile with the Percys, with their vast network in the north of England; on 11 May 1414, Henry Percy was restored to the Earldom of Northumberland, followed by a formal creation on 16 March 1416. (Note: This was a new creation, to stress that the attainder of the first earl had not been undone.)

== Service to the king ==
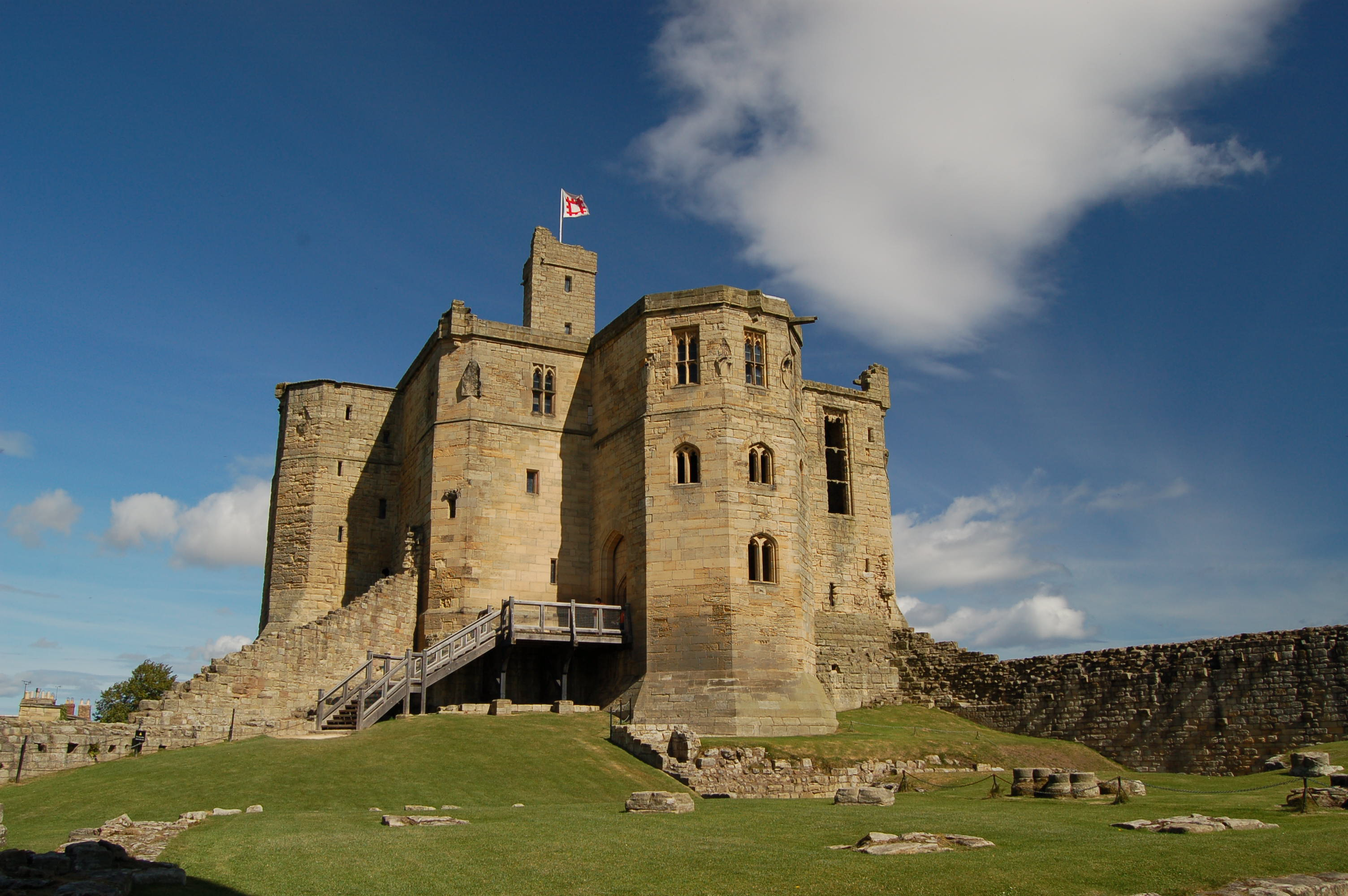
Warkworth Castle in Northumberland was the main residence of the Percy family.

Northumberland served occasionally in Henry V's wars in France over the following years. He joined the king on an expedition to the Continent in 1416, and sent a minor contingent of soldiers the next year. His main task, however, was the defence of the Scottish Borders, and on 16 December 1416 he was appointed Warden of the East March. In late August 1417, the Scots invaded northern England; while Albany laid siege to Berwick Castle, the Earl of Douglas attempted to take Roxburgh Castle. Percy lifted the siege of Berwick, and forced both Albany and Douglas across the border. At the same time, he was also involved in national political affairs, and acted as steward at the coronation of Henry's queen Catherine on 24 February 1421.

When Henry V died in 1422, Northumberland was appointed a member of the council appointed to govern during the minority of Henry VI. He might have been involved in an embassy to the Council of Siena in 1423, but still, his main area of responsibility lay in the border region. In the council, he seems to have belonged to Bishop Henry Beaufort's social circle, and he followed Beaufort—now cardinal—to peace negotiations at Berwick in 1429. As Warden of the East March, he was constantly occupied with peace negotiations and defence of northern England, but his efforts were constantly frustrated, and in 1434 he resigned his commission. The next year, Richard Neville, Earl of Salisbury, equally exasperated by the lack of royal support, gave up his commission as Warden of the West March. Northumberland was appointed joint warden with the earl of Huntingdon of both marches for one year, during which time, although suffering defeat by the Earl of Angus at the Battle of Piperdean, he was able to repel a siege on Roxburgh by James I of Scotland. In 1440 he was once more appointed Warden of the West March, and this time held the position until his death.

== Feud with Neville family ==
Initially, Northumberland's relations with the other great northern family, the Nevilles, were friendly. He was already connected to the Beaufort-Nevilles through his marriage with Eleanor Neville, and in 1426 he married his sister Elizabeth to the young Ralph Neville, 2nd Earl of Westmorland. In the early 1440s, Northumberland was involved in other disputes. A conflict over land with the Archbishop of York escalated into open violence. The king intervened on the archbishop's side, though Northumberland remained in favour at court. Nevertheless, he spent less time involved in central affairs at Westminster in the later 1440s.

In the early 1450s, the relationship between the Percy family and the Earl of Salisbury—Ralph Neville, 1st Earl of Westmorland's son by his second wife Joan Beaufort—started to deteriorate. What triggered the conflict was the marriage between Salisbury's son Thomas and Maud Stanhope, niece and heiress of Lord Cromwell. By this marriage Wressle Castle, which had traditionally been in the possession of the Percy family, would pass to the Nevilles. At the same time, the Neville-Cromwell wedding had led Huntingdon (now Duke of Exeter) to join the cause of the Percys, because of a territorial dispute with Cromwell. Northumberland himself, who was nearing sixty, did not take action at the time, but one of his younger sons did. Thomas Percy had been created Baron Egremont in 1449, relating to his possessions in the Neville-dominated county of Cumberland. On 24 August 1453, Thomas attacked the Neville-Cromwell wedding party at Heworth near York with a force of over 700 men. No one was killed in the skirmish, and the wedding party escaped intact.

The conflict, however, continued over the following years. On 8 October, Northumberland and Salisbury were summoned to court and ordered to end the conflict, but the warnings were ignored. Instead, the collective forces of the Percy and Neville families gathered at their Yorkshire strongholds of Topcliffe and Sand Hutton, respectively, only a few miles apart. Both sides had ignored royal commands to disband, and battle seemed inevitable, but eventually a truce ensued and the forces withdrew. Then, in October 1454, Thomas Percy and his brother Richard were captured by the Nevilles in a battle at Stamford Bridge. The conflict was escalating, and converging with events in national politics.

== Towards civil war ==
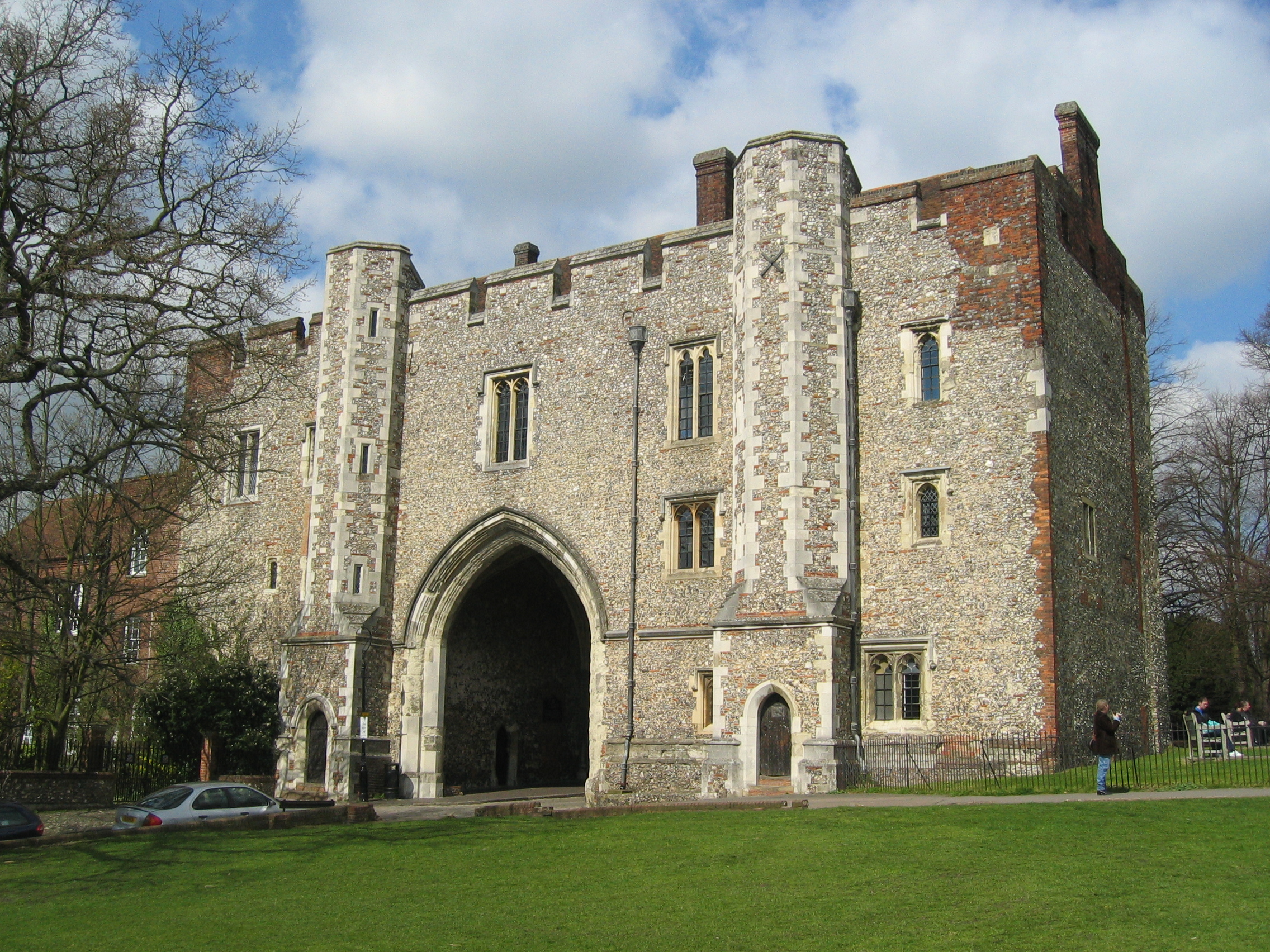
Henry Percy was buried at the abbey of St Albans Cathedral.

Discontent was brewing in England against the personal rule of Henry VI, who had been declared of age in 1437. The main antagonists were Richard, Duke of York, and Edmund Beaufort, Duke of Somerset. Somerset enjoyed great influence over the king, but after Henry had been incapacitated by mental illness in 1453, York was appointed protector in 1454. The Nevilles were by this time closely associated with York, so the natural option for Northumberland was to side with Somerset and the king. Attempts were made to reconcile Northumberland and Salisbury in the north, but little was accomplished. In December, the king rallied sufficiently to resume control of government, and York's protectorate was terminated. With Somerset back at the centre of power, civil war seemed imminent.

In May 1455, Northumberland was travelling with the king and Somerset to a great council at Leicester, when the party was intercepted by York and the Nevilles. On 22 May 1455, at the First Battle of St Albans, the royal forces clashed with the forces loyal to the Duke of York, in what has been described as the first battle of the Wars of the Roses. The battle was a complete victory for the Yorkist side, and led to another reversal of the political situation. The king was taken captive, and Somerset was killed. Northumberland was also among the casualties, and was buried at the nearby St Albans Abbey. A suggestion made by a contemporary chronicler, and supported by modern-day historians, said that the true purpose of the battle was to settle personal scores. Once York and Salisbury had killed Somerset and Northumberland, respectively, the battle was effectively over.

== Estates and family ==
The Percy estates were primarily located in the northern counties of Yorkshire, Northumberland, and Cumberland. Even though the title was restored in 1416, and the Percy estates were officially regranted, this did not mean the immediate return of all the family possessions. Protracted legal battles followed, particularly with John, Duke of Bedford. Even at the time of his death, Northumberland had not recovered all the estates once held by his grandfather.

Northumberland's marriage to Eleanor Neville produced at least ten children. Henry Percy was succeeded by his son Henry Percy, 3rd Earl of Northumberland, who himself died fighting in the Wars of the Roses, at the Battle of Towton on 29 March 1461.

Name	Birth date	Death date	Notes
John Percy	8 July 1418	–	
Henry, Baron Poynings, later 3rd Earl of Northumberland	25 July 1421	29 March 1461	Killed at the Battle of Towton
Thomas Percy, 1st Baron Egremont	29 November 1422	10 July 1460	Killed at the Battle of Northampton
Lady Katherine Percy	28 May 1423	Aft. 1475	Married Lord Edmund Grey, 1st Earl of Kent
George Percy	24 July 1424	14 November 1474	Rector of Rothbury and Caldbeck
Sir Ralph Percy	1425	25 April 1464	Killed at the Battle of Hedgeley Moor
Sir Richard Percy	1426/27	29 March 1461	Killed at the Battle of Towton
William Percy	7 April 1428	26 April 1462	Bishop of Carlisle
Joan Percy	1430	1482	a nun at Whitby
Anne Percy	3 February probably aft. 1428	5 July 1522	Married Sir Lawrence Raynsford and Sir Hugh Vaughan. Depicted in a stained glass at the Holy Trinity Church, Long Melford.

== Ancestry ==
Ancestors of Henry Percy, 2nd Earl of Northumberland

8. Henry Percy, 3rd Baron Percy
4. Henry Percy, 1st Earl of Northumberland
9. Mary of Lancaster
2. Henry Hotspur
10. Ralph Neville, 2nd Baron Neville
5. Margaret Neville
11. Alice Audley
1. Henry Percy, 2nd Earl of Northumberland
12. Roger Mortimer, 2nd Earl of March
6. Edmund Mortimer, 3rd Earl of March
13. Philippa Montagu
3. Elizabeth Mortimer
14. Lionel of Antwerp, 1st Duke of Clarence
7. Philippa, 5th Countess of Ulster
15. Elizabeth de Burgh, 4th Countess of Ulster

== Notes ==
Peerage of England
Preceded by Henry Percy	Earl of Northumberland; 1416–1455	Succeeded by Henry Percy
