= Katherine Percy, Countess of Kent =

Katherine Percy
- Countess of Kent
- Born: 18 May 1423; Alnwick, Northumberland, England
- Died: c. 1475
- Spouse: Edmund Grey, 1st Earl of Kent
- Issue: Mary Grey; Anthony Grey; Elizabeth Grey; Anne Grey; George Grey, 2nd Earl of Kent; John Grey; Edmund Grey
- Father: Henry Percy, 2nd Earl of Northumberland
- Mother: Lady Eleanor Neville

Lady Katherine Percy (18 May 1423 – c. 1475) was an English noblewoman who became Countess of Kent by marriage.

== Biography ==
Percy was born on 18 May 1423 in Alnwick, Northumberland. She was the daughter of Henry Percy, 2nd Earl of Northumberland, and Lady Eleanor Neville. Her maternal grandparents were Ralph Neville, 1st Earl of Westmorland and his second wife Joan Beaufort, a legitimized daughter of John of Gaunt.

She married Edmund Grey, 1st Earl of Kent, the son of Sir John Grey and Lady Constance Holland. They had seven children:

- Mary Grey (1440–1474);
- Anthony Grey (1446–1480), married Eleanor Woodville, daughter of Richard Woodville, 1st Earl Rivers and Jacquetta of Luxembourg;
- Elizabeth Grey (d. 1472), married Sir Robert Greystoke;
- Anne Grey (b. 1450), married John Grey, 8th Baron Grey de Wilton;
- George Grey, 2nd Earl of Kent (1454–1505), married Anne Woodville, another daughter of Richard Woodville, 1st Earl Rivers and Jacquetta of Luxembourg;
- John Grey (1455–1484);
- Edmund Grey (b. 1457).

She died about 1475.

== Ancestry ==
Ancestors of Katherine Percy, Countess of Kent

16. Henry de Percy, 3rd Baron Percy
8. Henry Percy, 1st Earl of Northumberland
17. Mary of Lancaster
4. Henry Hotspur Percy
18. Ralph Neville, 2nd Baron Neville de Raby
9. Lady Margaret Neville
19. Alice Audley
2. Henry Percy, 2nd Earl of Northumberland
20. Roger Mortimer, 2nd Earl of March
10. Edmund Mortimer, 3rd Earl of March
21. Lady Philippa Montagu
5. Lady Elizabeth Mortimer
22. Lionel of Antwerp, 1st Duke of Clarence
11. Philippa Plantagenet, 5th Countess of Ulster
23. Elizabeth de Burgh, 4th Countess of Ulster
1. Lady Katherine Percy
24. Ralph Neville, 2nd Baron Neville de Raby = 18
12. John Neville, 3rd Baron Neville de Raby
25. Alice Audley = 19
6. Ralph de Neville, 1st Earl of Westmorland
26. Henry de Percy, 2nd Baron Percy
13. Lady Maud Percy
27. Idoine de Clifford
3. Lady Eleanor Neville
28. Edward III of England
14. John of Gaunt, 1st Duke of Lancaster
29. Philippa of Hainault
7. Lady Joan Beaufort
30. Payne de Roet
15. Katherine Swynford
