= Henry Percy, 3rd Earl of Northumberland =

English magnate (1421–1461)

Henry Percy
- 3rd Earl of Northumberland
- Arms of Percy (modern), (Note: The ancient arms of Percy were: Azure, five fusils in fess or, both versions still quartered by the Percy Duke of Northumberland today) as seen on seal of Henry Percy: Or, a lion rampant azure (1&4); Gules, three lucies hauriant argent (2&3)
- Born: 25 July 1421; Leconfield, Yorkshire, England
- Died: 29 March 1461 (aged 39); Battle of Towton, Yorkshire
- Buried: St Denys's Church, York
- Family: Percy
- Spouse: Eleanor Poynings (m. 1435)
- Issue Detail: Henry Percy, 4th Earl of Northumberland; Eleanor Percy; Margaret Percy; Elizabeth Percy; Anne Percy
- Father: Henry Percy, 2nd Earl of Northumberland
- Mother: Lady Eleanor Neville

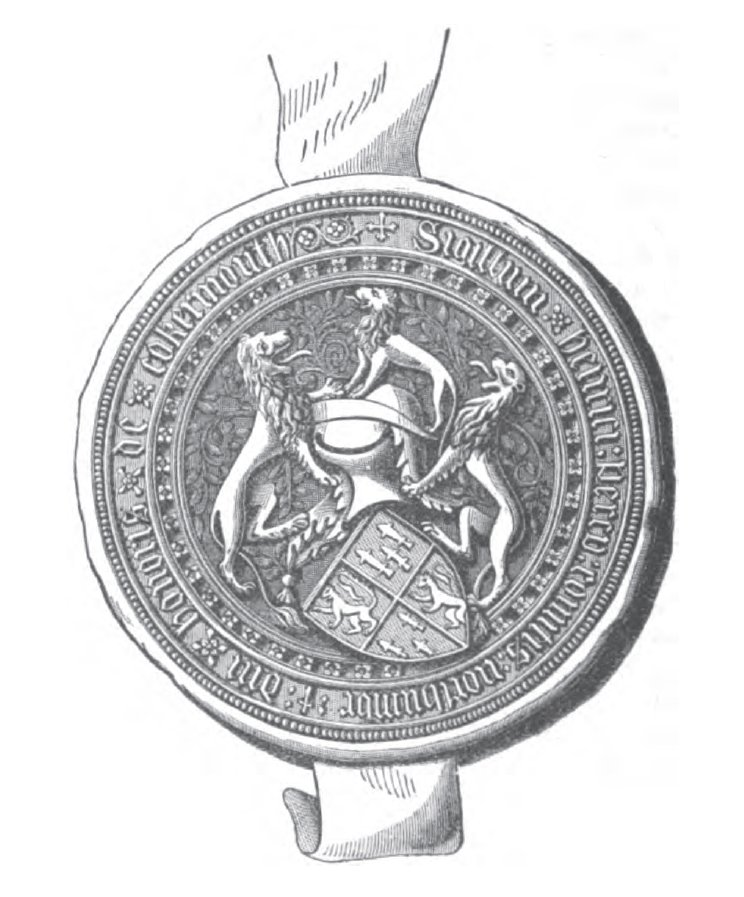
Seal of Henry Percy, 3rd Earl of Northumberland (1421–1461). Inscribed: Sigillum Henrici Percy comitis Northumbr (...) + (et) d (omin)i de Cokermouth ("seal of Henry Percy Earl of Northumberland and lord of Cockermouth"). On the escutcheon are shown arms quarterly of 4: 1&4 :Or, a lion rampant azure (Brabant (Percy)); 2&3: Gules, three lucies hauriant argent (Lucy). Crest above: On a chapeau gules turned up ermine a lion statant the tail extended azure (Percy)

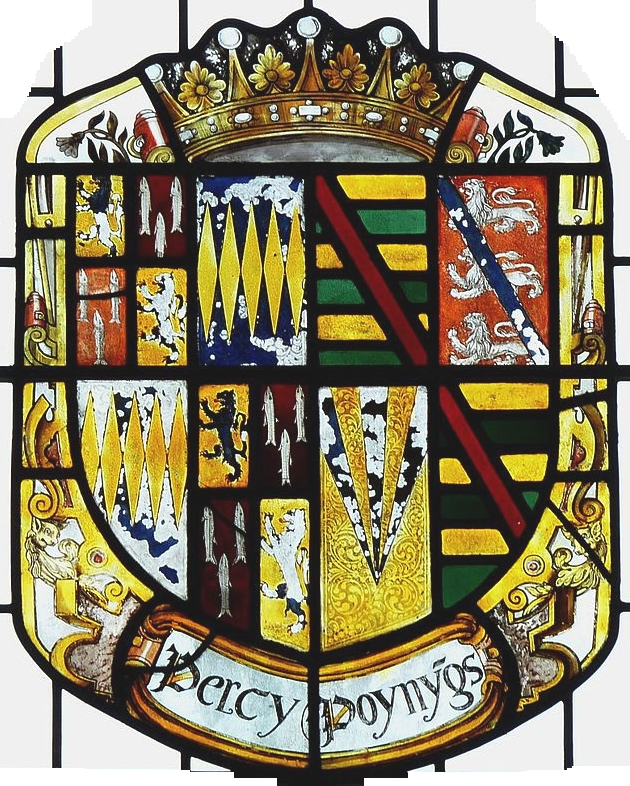
Arms of Henry Percy, 3rd Earl of Northumberland impaling Poynings, his wife's family. Detail from the 16th century stained glass Percy Window at Petworth House, Sussex

Henry Percy, 3rd Earl of Northumberland, (25 July 1421 – 29 March 1461) was an English magnate.

The Earldom of Northumberland was then one of the greatest landholdings in northern England; Percy also became Lord Poynings on his marriage. This title would bring him into direct conflict with the Poynings family themselves, and indeed, feuds with neighbouring nobles, both lay and ecclesiastical, would be a key occupancy of his youth.

Percy married Eleanor Poynings, who outlived him; together they had five children. He was a leading Lancastrian during the Wars of the Roses, from which he managed to personally benefit, although his father died early in the war. He was not, however, to live to enjoy these gains, being killed at the Battle of Towton in 1461 on the defeated Lancastrian side.

== Early life and war with Scotland ==
Percy was the son of Henry Percy, 2nd Earl of Northumberland, and Lady Eleanor Neville, daughter of Ralph Neville, 1st Earl of Westmorland, and his second wife, Joan Beaufort. (Note: Percy's maternal uncles included Richard Neville, 5th Earl of Salisbury. His maternal aunts included Cecily Neville, through whom he was closely related to the House of York: Edward IV of England, Margaret of York, George, Duke of Clarence, and Richard III of England were all first cousins.)

Percy was knighted in 1426 together with Henry VI. He was appointed Warden of the Eastern March on the Scottish border on 1 April 1440, originally for four years, and subsequent extensions in 1444, and 1445, for the next seven years. This came as well with the custody of Berwick Castle and responsibility for its defence He was to hold this post until March 1461. In May 1448, Percy, with his father and Sir Robert Ogle, invaded Scotland and burnt Dunbar and Dumfries, for which, in revenge, the Scots attacked his father's castles of Alnwick and Warkworth. King Henry made his way north, and whilst at Durham sent Percy – now Lord Poynings – to raid Dumfrieshire; the sortie – "only to return with some 500 cattle" – of around 5,000 men failed, and he was captured whilst caught in a marsh following his father's defeat at the River Sark on 23 October. Sir Robert Ogle was now outlawed and the king used half of his estates to compensate Poynings for the ransom he had expended arranging his release from captivity.

Tensions with Scotland remained, to the extent that Poynings, his father, and other nobles were requested to stay and guard the border rather than attend Parliament, for which they were excused. In summer 1451, with an Anglo-Scottish truce pending, Poynings was commissioned to treat with Scottish embassies. In July 1455, he successfully prevented an assault on Berwick by the Scottish King, James II, and was congratulated by the English King as a result.

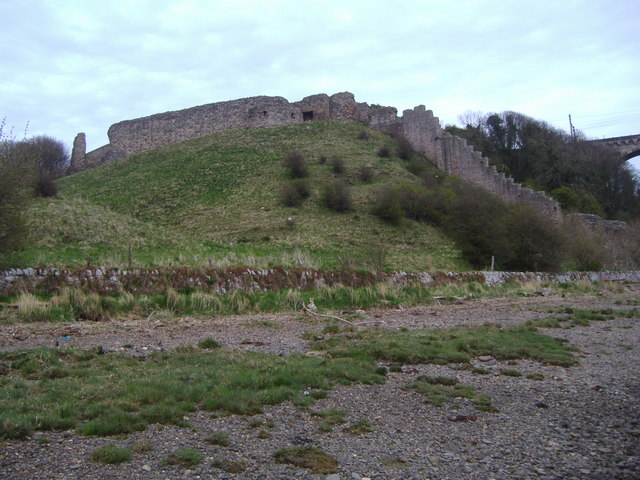
The remains of Berwick Castle today

== Feud with the Poynings ==
In the late 1440s, the Yorkshire tenants of his father, the Earl of Northumberland, were in almost constant conflict with their neighbours, those of the Archbishop of York, involving armed skirmishes which Percy's brothers led. These events were deemed so severe that in 1448 they led to the only progress north for the King during his reign. The same year, because of a dispute over the inheritance his family received as a result of Henry Percy's marriage, the Earl of Northumberland's retainers had ejected the earl's relative, Robert Poynings, from his Sussex manors. A year later, Henry Percy – now Lord Poynings by right of his wife – took direct part, with his father, in raiding the manor of Newington Bertram in Kent, which was also enfeoffed by Robert. This attack also apparently involved cattle rustling and theft, and Robert later claimed it to be so brutal that he was "deterred from seeking a remedy at law for three years".

== Feud with Nevilles ==
By the early 1450s, relations with a powerful neighbouring family, the Nevilles, became increasingly tense, and Poynings' brother Thomas, Lord Egremont, had finally ambushed a Neville force, returning from a wedding, near Sheriff Hutton, with a force of between 1,000 and 5,000 men. Although this was a bloodless confrontation, a precedent for the use of force in this particular dispute had already been laid in the previous violence in the region. By October 1453, Poynings was directly involved, with his father, brothers Egremont and Richard, and joined by Lord Clifford, in forcing a battle with John and Richard Neville at Topcliffe. The feud continued into the next year, when Poynings reportedly planned on attending parliament accompanied by a large force of men in February, and three months later both he and the earl were summoned by the king to attend council in an attempt to impose a peace; a second letter was "written but not despatched". Neither, along with John Neville or Salisbury, did as requested.

== Wars of the Roses ==
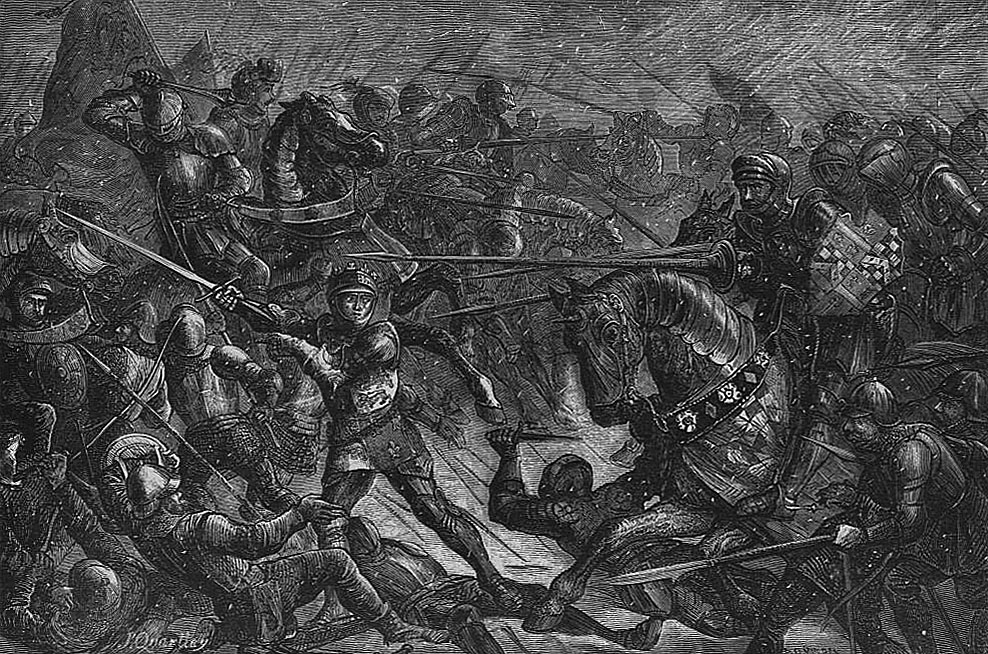
John Quartley's 19th-century depiction of the Battle of Towton

During the Wars of the Roses, Percy followed his father in siding with the Lancastrians against the Yorkists. The Earl himself died at what is generally considered to be the first battle of the wars, at St Alban's on 22 May 1455, and Poynings was elevated as third Earl of Northumberland, without having to pay relief to the Crown, because his father had died in the King's service. He in his turn "swore to uphold the Lancastrian dynasty". Although a reconciliation of the leading magnates of the realm was attempted in October 1458 in London, he arrived with such a large body of men (thought to be around 1,500) that the city denied him entry. The new earl and his brother Egremont were bound over £4,000 each to keep the peace.

When conflict broke out again, he attended the so-called Parliament of Devils in October 1459, which condemned as traitors those Yorkists accused of, among other offences, causing the death of his father four years before. On 30 December 1460, Percy led the central "battle" or section of the victorious Lancastrian army at the Battle of Wakefield, following which, the army marched south, pillaging on the road to London. He fought against Warwick at the second Battle of St. Albans on 17 February 1461, and he commanded the Lancastrian van at the Battle of Towton on 29 March 1461, however, "his archers were blinded by snowstorms", and he was either slain in close fighting or died of his wounds soon after. He was buried at St Denys's Church, York. He was posthumously attainted by the first parliament of the victorious Edward IV in November 1461, and his son and namesake was committed to the Tower.

== Estates, offices and finances ==
The estates of the Earls of Northumberland had traditionally been in constant use as a source of manpower and wages in defence of the border since the Percy family first gained the office the previous century. The wages assigned to the third Earl were substantial: £2,500 yearly in time of peace, and £5,000 during war, as well as an annual payment for the maintenance of Berwick's upkeep (£66 in peacetime and £120 in wartime). Percy often had to provide from his own resources, however, as "securing payment was not easy" from the Exchequer, (for example, in 1454 he received no payments at all). In July 1452 he gained a twenty-year fee-farm (£80 yearly, from Carlisle), although he subsequently lost it in favour of Richard Neville, Earl of Salisbury, in July 1454. Throughout the 1450s, the Crown continually made efforts at paying Percy his Warden's wages and fees promptly (paying him full wartime rates for the whole of the year 1456–7, for example), and since he was a loyal Lancastrian he achieved this more often than his counterpart on the west march, Salisbury, who by now had publicly aligned himself with York. The fee farm of Carlisle was returned to Percy in November 1459, following Salisbury's attainder in Coventry. He also benefited from the attainder of York, being granted an annuity of £66 from the latter's forfeited Wakefield Lordship in Yorkshire; he also received £200 from the profits of Penrith.

As a reward for his role in the Lancastrian victory at Ludford Bridge, he was made Chief Forester north of the River Trent and the Constable of Scarborough Castle on 22 December 1459 for life. He was nominated to a wide-ranging commission of oyer and terminer (from the old French, literally a commission "to hear and determine") on 30 May 1460, his new rank was a tactic to deal with the treasons and insurrections in Northumberland. On 3 July, he was granted Yorkshire, Derbyshire, and Cambridgeshire, all belonging to Salisbury, on a twelve-year lease. After the Yorkists captured Henry VI at the Battle of Northampton in 1460, they accused Percy of having looted York's northern estates during his exile in Ireland. This charge was likely to have had some truth in it, as it was his continued pillaging of those estates, with the Lords Clifford and Dacre, that led to York marching north to Wakefield in December 1460. These incomes, however collected, would have been vital to the Earl both personally and militarily as his northern estates especially had been a victim of feudal decline for most of the first half of the fifteenth century: even on the forfeit of the earldom to the Crown in 1461, his arrears have been calculated as still standing at approximately £12,000.

== Family ==
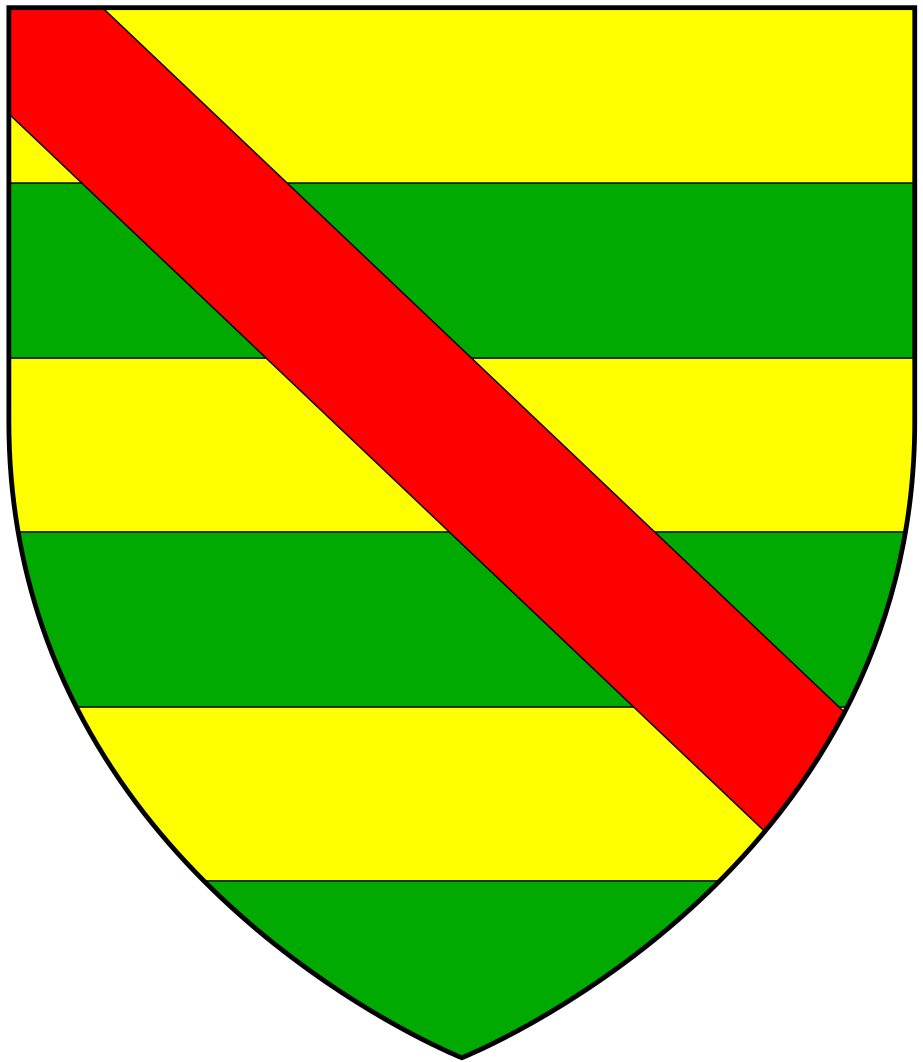
Arms of Poynings: Barry of six or and vert a bend gules. Subsequently quartered by Percy

On or before 25 June 1435, by the arrangement in 1434 of his father and Cardinal Beaufort, he married Eleanor Poynings (c. 1422 – 11 February 1484), suo jure Baroness Poynings, daughter and heiress of Sir Richard Poynings of Poynings in Sussex, by his second wife Eleanor Berkeley, a daughter of Sir John Berkeley of Beverston Castle in Gloucestershire. In 1446 she became heir general to her grandfather Robert Poynings, 4th Baron Poynings (1380–1446), inherited his title of Baron Poynings (which having been created by writ was able to descend to females) and his large estates across the south of England. He was summoned to Parliament from 14 December 1446 to 26 May 1455, by writs directed Henrico de Percy, chivaler, domino de Ponynges ("Henry de Percy, Knight, lord of the manor of Poynings"). His wife was a legatee in the 1455 will of her mother, Eleanor, Countess of Arundel (widow of John FitzAlan, 13th Earl of Arundel). They had at least one son and four daughters:

- Anne Percy (1444–1522), who married Sir Thomas Hungerford in 1460.
- Margaret Percy (b. c. 1447), who married Sir William Gascoigne
- Henry Percy, 4th Earl of Northumberland (c. 1449 – 28 April 1489), who married Maud Herbert, daughter of the first Earl of Pembroke.
- Eleanor Percy (1455-c. 1477), who married Thomas West, 8th Baron De La Warr; they had no children.
- Elizabeth Percy (1460–1512), who married Henry Scrope, 6th Baron Scrope of Bolton.

== Ancestry ==
Ancestors of Henry Percy, 3rd Earl of Northumberland

8. Henry Percy, 1st Earl of Northumberland
4. Henry "Hotspur" Percy
9. Margaret Neville (died 1372), widow of William, Lord Ros of Helmsley
2. Henry Percy, 2nd Earl of Northumberland
10. Edmund Mortimer, 3rd Earl of March
5. Lady Elizabeth Mortimer
11. Philippa, 5th Countess of Ulster
1. Henry Percy, 3rd Earl of Northumberland
12. John Neville, 3rd Baron Neville de Raby
6. Ralph de Neville, 1st Earl of Westmorland
13. Lady Maud Percy
3. Lady Eleanor Neville (Note: Married first Richard, Lord Despenser (died 1414), and then Henry Percy (Tuck 2004))
14. John of Gaunt, 1st Duke of Lancaster
7. Lady Joan Beaufort
15. Katherine Swynford

== Notes ==
Peerage of England
Preceded by Henry Percy	Earl of Northumberland; 1455–1461	Succeeded by John Neville
