= Anne Woodville =

English noblewoman

- Viscountess Bourchier
- Born: Late 1438; Grafton Regis, Northamptonshire, England
- Died: 30 July 1489 (aged 50–51)
- Noble family: Woodville
- Spouses: William Bourchier, Viscount Bourchier; George Grey, 2nd Earl of Kent
- Issue: Henry Bourchier, 2nd Earl of Essex, 6th Baron Bourchier, Viscount Bourchier, 2nd Count of Eu; Cecily Bourchier; Isabel Bourchier; Richard Grey, 3rd Earl of Kent
- Father: Richard Woodville, 1st Earl Rivers
- Mother: Jacquetta of Luxembourg
- Occupation: Lady-in-waiting

Anne Woodville, Viscountess Bourchier (c. 1438 – 30 July 1489) was an English noblewoman. She was a younger sister of Queen Consort Elizabeth Woodville to whom she served as a lady-in-waiting. Anne was married twice; first to William Bourchier, Viscount Bourchier, and secondly to George Grey, 2nd Earl of Kent. Anne was the grandmother of the disinherited adulteress Anne Bourchier, 7th Baroness Bourchier, and an ancestress of Robert Devereux, 2nd Earl of Essex.

== Family ==
Anne Woodville was born in about 1439 at Grafton Regis, Northamptonshire, the second eldest daughter, and one of the fourteen children of Richard Woodville, 1st Earl Rivers and Jacquetta of Luxembourg. Her elder sister was Elizabeth Woodville who would become Queen Consort of King Edward IV of England.

Anne's paternal grandparents were Sir Richard Wydeville and Joan Bedlisgate, and her maternal grandparents were Peter I of Luxembourg, Count of Saint-Pol, Conversano and Brienne, and Margaret de Baux.

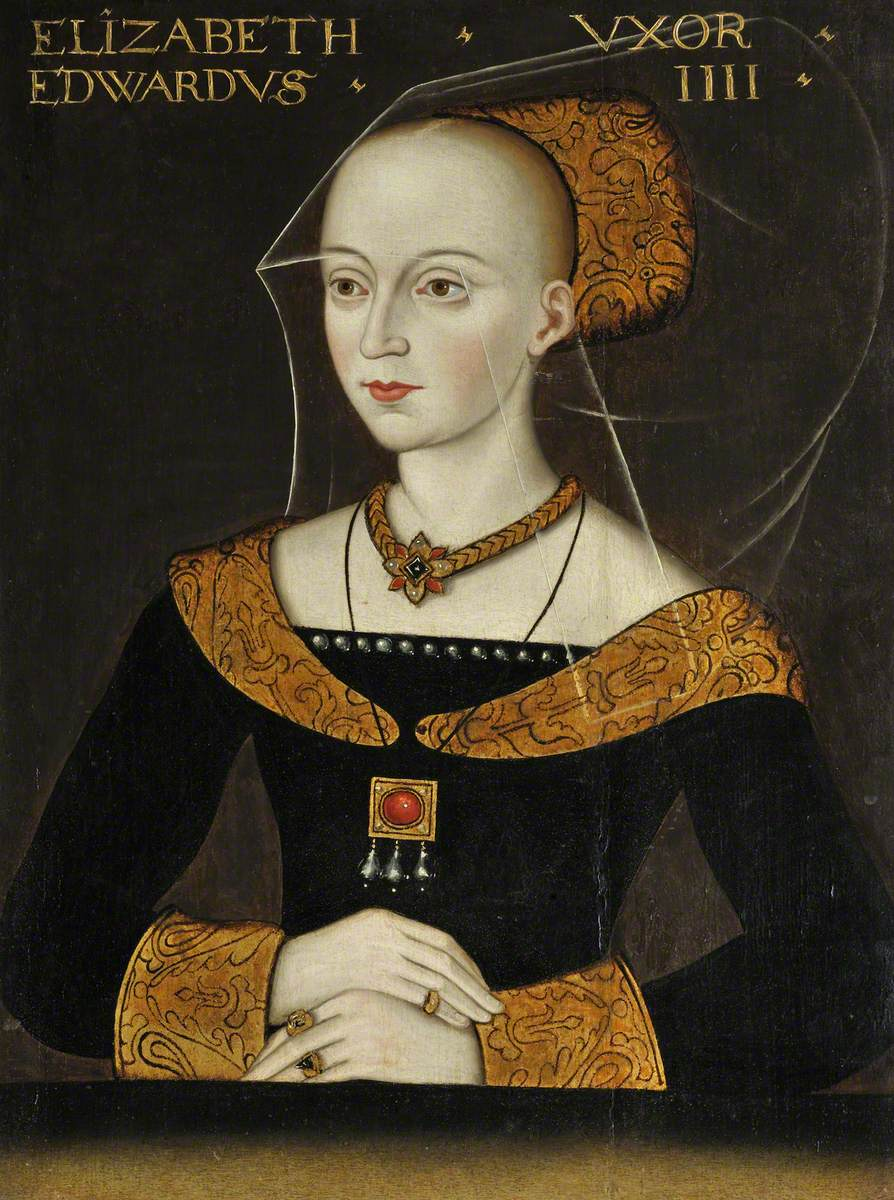
Queen consort Elizabeth Woodville, the elder sister of Anne Woodville

In 1466, two years after her sister Elizabeth's secret marriage to King Edward, and one year after her coronation, Anne became one of Queen Elizabeth's ladies-in-waiting, receiving forty pounds a year for her services.

== Marriages and issue ==
Sometime before 15 August 1467, Anne married William Bourchier, Viscount Bourchier, the son and heir of Henry Bourchier, 1st Earl of Essex, and Isabel of York.

Anne's was one of the many advantageous marriages Queen Elizabeth arranged for her siblings, with eligible scions of the most aristocratic families in the realm, with the purpose of augmenting her family's power, prestige and wealth. This ambitious policy of the Queen antagonised the old nobility and House of Commons against the entire Woodville family.

One of the most formidable enemies of the Woodvilles was Richard Neville, 16th Earl of Warwick, a former Yorkist supporter who switched his allegiance to the Lancastrians following King Edward's marriage to Elizabeth. In 1469, Warwick ordered the execution of Anne's father, Earl Rivers and her brother, John. They had both been taken prisoner when the King's army was defeated by Warwick's forces at the Battle of Edgecote Moor.

William and Anne received lands worth one hundred pounds a year. Anne was briefly the owner of the manors of Nether Hall and Over Hall in the county of Suffolk. These had previously belonged to James Butler, 5th Earl of Ormond, a staunch supporter and favourite of Queen Margaret of Anjou. He was beheaded in 1461 following the crushing Lancastrian defeat at the Battle of Towton, and his properties were subsequently forfeited to the victorious Yorkist king, Edward IV.

On 14 April 1471, William fought at the Battle of Barnet on the side of the Yorkists who won a decisive victory.

Anne had three children by her first husband William:

- Henry Bourchier, 2nd Earl of Essex, 6th Baron Bourchier, Viscount Bourchier, 2nd Count of Eu (died 13 March 1540), married Mary Say, by whom he had one daughter, Anne Bourchier, suo jure 7th Baroness Bourchier who was the sole heiress to his titles and estates. She was the first wife of William Parr, 1st Marquess of Northampton whom she deserted to elope with her lover, thus creating a scandal which resulted in the forfeiture of her estates and most of her titles.
- Cecily Bourchier (died 1493), married John Devereux, 9th Baron Ferrers of Chartley, by whom she had a son, Walter Devereux, 1st Viscount Hereford, and a daughter, Anne Devereux. Robert Devereux, Earl of Essex (1565–1601) was a notable descendant of Walter who in his turn had married Mary Grey, the daughter of Thomas Grey, 1st Marquess of Dorset and Cecily Bonville.
- Isabel Bourchier (1477 – after 1500), died unmarried.

William died on 26 June 1480. Shortly afterwards, Anne married George Grey, son and heir of Edmund Grey, 1st Earl of Kent. As George did not succeed to the title of Earl of Kent until 1490, Anne was never styled Countess of Kent, due to her death in 1489.

The marriage produced one son:

- Richard Grey, 3rd Earl of Kent (1481 – 3 May 1524), he died heavily in debt, and without legitimate issue.

== Downfall of the Woodvilles ==
In 1483, the Woodville family fortunes took a downward spiral with the death of King Edward IV in April. Anne's sister, Elizabeth, as the mother of the new young king Edward V, became the queen mother; however, in June 1483, her marriage to the late King was judged to have been invalid because Edward had allegedly been pre-contracted to Lady Eleanor Talbot. King Edward IV's younger brother Richard, Duke of Gloucester and Lord Protector, claimed the crown for himself on 22 June; this claim was supported by an act of parliament known as Titulus Regius which declared King Edward V and his siblings illegitimate. Elizabeth, now styled as Dame Grey, was forced to seek sanctuary with her daughters, while her two sons, the "Princes in the Tower" were kept in the Tower of London by the orders of King Richard III. On 25 June 1483, King Richard also ordered the executions of Anne and Elizabeth's brother Anthony Woodville, Earl Rivers, and Richard Grey who was Elizabeth's younger son by her first marriage to Sir John Grey of Groby.

== Death ==
Anne Woodville, Viscountess Bourchier, died on 30 July 1489, at the age of about fifty-one years. Her death occurred almost four years after the Battle of Bosworth when King Richard was slain by Henry Tudor who married Anne's niece Elizabeth of York. Anne was buried in Warden, Bedfordshire.

A year after Anne's death, her husband George married secondly Catherine Herbert, daughter of William Herbert, 1st Earl of Pembroke and Anne Devereux, by whom he had four more children.
