= Thomas Percy, 1st Baron Egremont =

English nobleman (1422–1460)

Thomas Percy
- 1st Baron Egremont
- Tenure: 20 November 1449 – 10 July 1460
- Years active: 1449–1460
- Born: 29 November 1422; Leconfield, Yorkshire
- Died: 10 July 1460 (aged 37); Battle of Northampton
- Wars and battles: Percy-Neville feud • Battle of Heworth Moor; Wars of the Roses • Battle of Northampton
- Spouse: (unknown)
- Issue: John Egremont (illegitimate)
- House: House of Percy
- Father: Henry Percy, 2nd Earl of Northumberland
- Mother: Eleanor Neville

Thomas Percy, 1st Baron Egremont (29 November 1422 – 10 July 1460) was a scion of a leading noble family from northern England during the fifteenth century. Described by one historian as "quarrelsome, violent and contemptuous of all authority", Egremont was involved in numerous riots and disturbances in the northern localities, and became a leading figure in the internecine Percy–Neville feud. When the Wars of the Roses began mid-decade, Egremont fought for the king on the Lancastrian side, being killed five years later at the Battle of Northampton.

== Early years ==
His youth was rarely peaceful; at the age of twenty five he was part of a force that engaged the tenants of the Archbishop of York, John Kemp in a physical confrontation (possibly to the disapproval of his father and elder brother, Henry, Lord Poynings, although it is equally possible that he began a 'propaganda campaign' against Kemp at the same time) outside the village of Stamford Bridge. Following the skirmish with the men of Beverley, he was subsequently imprisoned at York Castle- the direct result, it has been suggested of the Archbishop manipulating the jury and County Sheriff, whilst getting his own tenants released instead. It is possible that the king's clear support for the Archbishop, notwithstanding their position as one of the region's greatest magnatial families, was influential in their decision to later feud with the Percies rather than take it to the king for arbitration.

Conflict in the north was not only over local rivalries; English relations with Scotland periodically descended into warfare throughout the Middle Ages, and the mid-fifteenth century was no exception. However, Egremont seems not to have been part of the campaign of October 1448, when his father the earl and his brother Lord Poyning's led an army of 6,000 men across the border only to be routed at the Battle of Sark; Poynings himself was captured, to be eventually ransomed by the Scots.

== Lands and estates ==
Cockermouth, in Cumberland, held by Thomas Percy, was a traditional Percy Honour, as was that of Egremont; it is likely to have been due to his father's influence at court, as the earl of Northumberland was currently a Royal Councillor, and his connections with the king's chief minister Cardinal Beaufort that on 20 November 1449 he was made Lord Egremont by Letters Patent, drawing £10 per annum from the county revenues. This figure reflects the fact that Egremont was never to be a wealthy man; it has been calculated that the Percy Cumberland estates suffered a decline of 25% between 1416 and 1470. Equally diminishing to Egremont's income was that the barony itself had been divided threeways through inheritances, and at least one-third of it- that of the Fitzwalter family- had been granted to the earl of Salisbury under a 40-year lease at the time of Thomas Percy's grant.

== Percy-Neville feud ==
It is not certain exactly when the bad blood between the two families begun; A. J. Pollard has pointed out that they were cooperating together over parliamentary elections in 1449, and as late as 1453; the former husting was attended by Sir Thomas Percy shortly before his elevation to the peerage.

== See also ==
- Percy-Neville feud
- Hundred Years' War
- Wars of the Roses
