= Battle of Hedgeley Moor =

25 April 1464 battle of the Wars of the Roses

Coordinates: 55.471°N 1.924°W

- Part of the Wars of the Roses
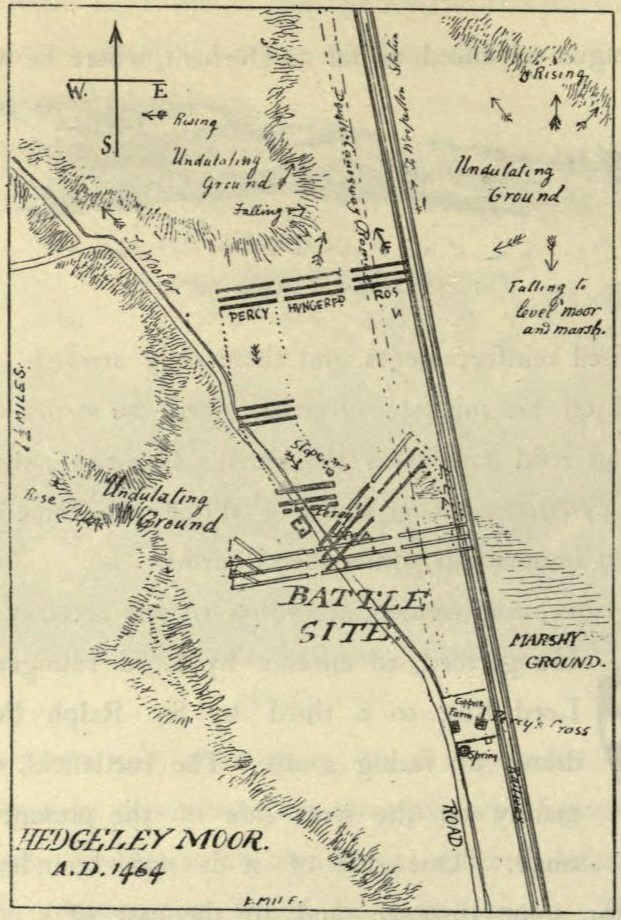
- Plan of the battle of Hedgeley Moor (Battles and Battlefields in England, 1896)
Date	25 April 1464
Location	Hedgeley Moor in Northumberland, England
Result	Yorkist victory

Belligerents
House of York	House of Lancaster

Commanders and leaders
Baron Montagu	Duke of Somerset; Baron Ros; Baron Hungerford; Sir Ralph Percy †

Strength
6,000	5,000

Casualties and losses
Unknown	Unknown

Hedgley Moor shown within Northumberland (grid reference NU049197)

The Battle of Hedgeley Moor, 25 April 1464, took place during the Wars of the Roses. It was fought at Hedgeley Moor, north of the villages of Glanton and Powburn in Northumberland, between a Yorkist army led by John Neville, Lord Montagu and a Lancastrian army led by Henry Beaufort, Duke of Somerset. The battle ended in a Yorkist victory.

== Background ==
At the beginning of 1464, after setbacks in 1463, the Lancastrians were hoping that the Welsh Marches and the West Country would rise in their support. The Yorkists wanted to remove the threat of Scottish invasion, by reaching an agreement with the Scots. The English parliament was due to meet at York on 5 May to discuss terms with a party from Scotland, but a burst of Lancastrian activity in Northumberland and North Yorkshire meant that it would be difficult for the Scottish party to travel safely to York. Lord Montagu was therefore sent north with a small force to escort them to York.

The Duke of Somerset tried to ambush Montagu near Newcastle but the latter was able to evade this attempt. He continued his journey northwards, gathering troops as he went. When Montagu reached Hedgeley Moor he had an army of five or six thousand men. There he met a Lancastrian army of five thousand men commanded by Somerset. The Lancastrian army also included Lords Ros and Hungerford and Sir Ralph Percy.

== Battle ==
The battle began with the normal exchange of archery between the two armies. Montagu (John Neville), then advanced across the 1,500 yards of moorland, only to be forced to halt and readjust his lines when the Lancastrian left flank, under Lords Ros and Hungerford (some 2,000 men), faltered, broke, and scattered.

The whole Lancastrian force gave way when the Yorkists clashed with their line. Pushed back by weight of numbers all but a few of the remaining Lancastrians fled the field. Sir Ralph Percy stayed with his household retainers and made a brave last stand. However, deserted by the rest of the army, including all the other commanders, he was soon slain. As he died he is said to have uttered the enigmatic words: ‘I have saved the bird in my bosom’.

== Aftermath ==
The defeat and dispersal of the Lancastrian forces made it possible for the Scottish negotiators to be safely escorted to York, where a peaceful solution between Edward IV's Yorkists and the Scots was successfully negotiated. With regard to the Lancastrians, this battle was shortly followed by the decisive Battle of Hexham, on 15 May 1464.

A square sandstone pillar stands near the site of the battle, and is known as ‘Percy’s Cross’. It can be found on the east side of the A697, a couple of miles north of the village of Powburn. The road at this point is following the line of the Roman road known as the Devil's Causeway.

There are two ballads commemorating the battle, The Battle of Hedgley Moor by Frederick Sheldon, and The Legend of Percy's Cross by James Service.
