= Edmund Grey, 1st Earl of Kent =

English administrator, nobleman and magnate

- Arms of Edmund Grey, Earl of Kent: Quarterly, 1st and 4th: Barry of six argent and azure in chief three torteaux (Grey); 2nd and 3rd: Or, a maunch gules (Hastings) quartering Barry of argent and azure an orle of martlets gules (Valence). From his 1442 seal.
- Born: 26 October 1416
- Died: 22 May 1490 (aged 73)
- Spouse: Katherine Percy
- Children: 4+, including George
- Father: John Grey
- Relatives: Reginald Grey (grandfather); John Holland (grandfather)

Edmund Grey, 1st Earl of Kent, KB (26 October 1416 – 22 May 1490) was an English administrator, nobleman and magnate, and the son of Sir John Grey, KG and Constance Holland. His main residence was at Wrest near Silsoe, Bedfordshire.

== Lineage ==
Through Constance Holland, he was a great-grandson of John of Gaunt, 1st Duke of Lancaster, the third son of King Edward III of England, and thus grand-nephew of King Henry IV of England.

Grey succeeded his grandfather Reginald Grey, 3rd Baron Grey de Ruthyn in 1440.

He married Lady Katherine Percy, who was also a great-granddaughter of John of Gaunt by his third wife, Katherine Swynford, and also a descendant of King Edward III of England through his second son, Lionel of Antwerp, 1st Duke of Clarence.

== Knighthood ==
Edmund Grey was knighted following service in Aquitaine in October 1440. He attended the royal council between 1456 and 1458. Active militarily in the Wars of the Roses, he especially played a decisive role in the Battle of Northampton by switching his allegiance from the Lancastrian to the Yorkist cause. For this action he was rewarded by Edward IV with a grant of the manor of Ampthill, ownership of which had come into dispute between Grey, Ralph, Lord Cromwell, and Henry Holland, Duke of Exeter.

== Treasurer of England ==
Edmund Grey's appointment as treasurer of England was enacted at Westminster on 24 June 1463, but Walter Blount succeeded him in November 1464. Edmund also held other high offices under Edward IV and Richard III.

On 5 July 1483, he was made a Knight of the Bath. In 1485, he was constable of Northampton Castle.

== Earldom ==
He was created Earl of Kent on 30 May 1465, shortly after the marriage of his eldest son, Anthony, to the king's sister-in-law, Joan Woodville (she is sometimes known as Eleanor Woodville) He was then appointed chief justice of the county of Meryonnyth, North Wales and constable of Harlech. After the death of their first son, the second, George, became his heir and eventually George Grey, 2nd Earl of Kent.

== Posterity ==
His children by Katherine Percy included:

- Anthony Grey (died in his father's lifetime), married Eleanor Woodville sister of Elizabeth Woodville. There were no children
- George Grey, 2nd Earl of Kent, married Anne Woodville then Katherine Herbert, daughter of William Herbert, 1st Earl of Pembroke
- Elizabeth Grey, married Sir Robert Greystoke
- Anne Grey, married John Grey, 8th Baron Grey of Wilton

== Notes ==
Political offices
Preceded by The Earl of Worcester	Lord High Treasurer; 1463–1464	Succeeded by The Lord Mountjoy
Peerage of England
New creation	Earl of Kent; 1465–1490	Succeeded by George Grey
Preceded by Reginald Grey	Baron Grey de Ruthyn; 1440–1490	Succeeded by George Grey
