= Battle of Northampton (1460) =

Major battle of the Wars of the Roses

Coordinates: 52°13′23.4″N 0°53′2.8″W

- Part of the Wars of the Roses
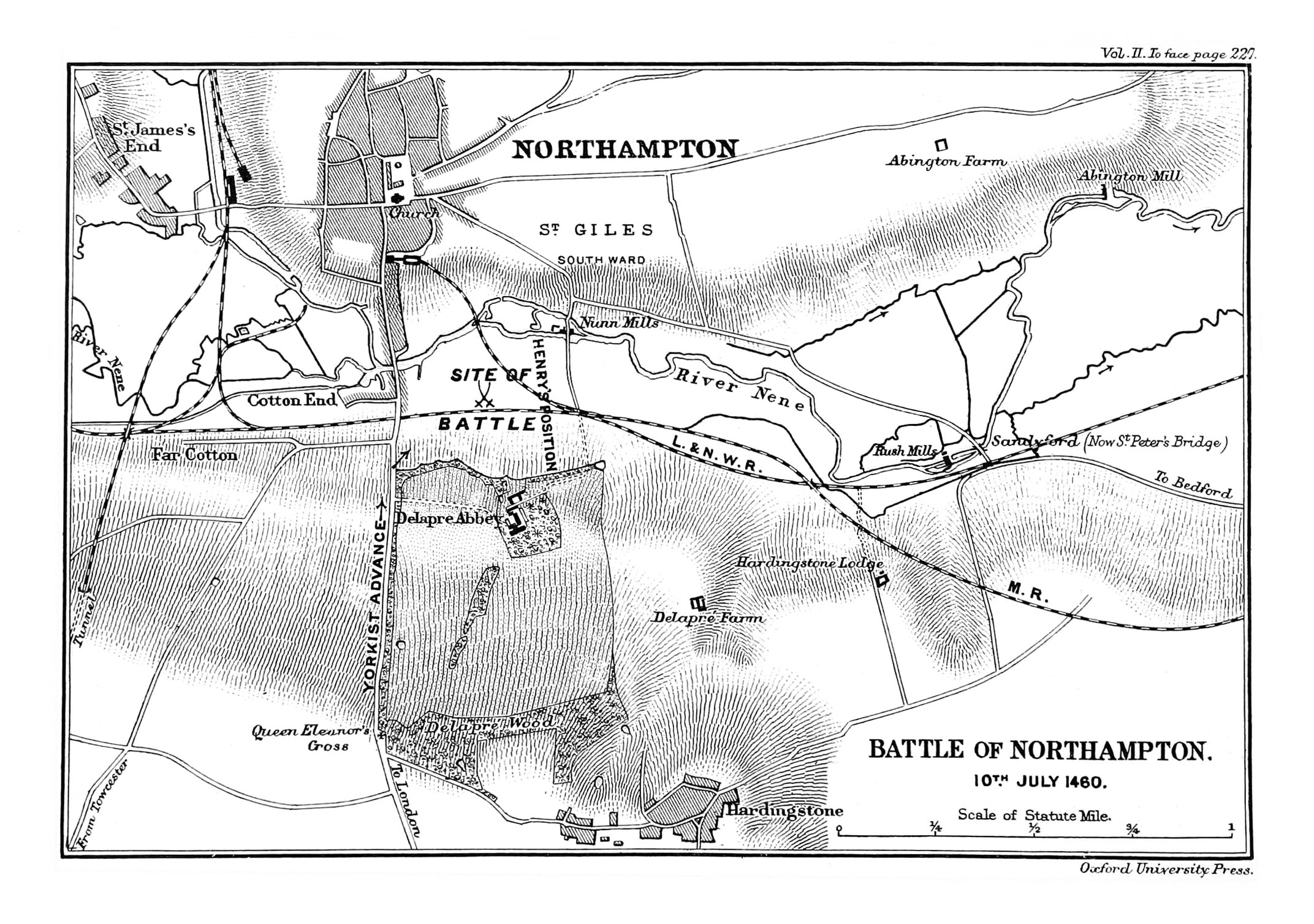
- Map of the battle by James Henry Ramsay (1892)
Date	10 July 1460
Location	Northampton, Northamptonshire, England
Result	Yorkist victory

Belligerents
House of York	House of Lancaster

Commanders and leaders
Earl of Warwick; Earl of March; Baron Fauconberg	Henry VI (surrendered); Duke of Buckingham †; Earl of Shrewsbury †; Viscount Beaumont †; Baron Egremont †; Baron Grey (switched sides)

Strength
Unknown	5,000

Casualties and losses
Unknown	300 killed

The Battle of Northampton was fought on 10 July 1460 near the River Nene, Northamptonshire. It was a major battle of the Wars of the Roses. The opposing forces were an army led by nobles loyal to King Henry VI of the House of Lancaster, his Queen Margaret of Anjou and their six-year-old son Edward, Prince of Wales, on one side, and the army of Edward, Earl of March, and Warwick the Kingmaker on the other. The battle was the first in which artillery was used in England.

== Background ==
After the disintegration of the Yorkist army at Ludford Bridge in 1459, many of the Yorkist commanders went into self-imposed exile. The Duke of York and his second son Edmund, Earl of Rutland, retired to the relative safety of Dublin, Ireland. His principal supporters the Earl of Warwick and his father the Earl of Salisbury, and York's son Edward, Earl of March, reached Calais on 2 November 1459, where Warwick found his uncle Lord Fauconberg. In England, the Lancastrians were quick to exploit the Yorkist flight. The Earl of Wiltshire was appointed Lieutenant of Ireland and the Duke of Somerset became Captain of Calais. Neither however succeeded in occupying their new posts as the Irish refused to dislodge York and the gates of Calais remained firmly closed to their new 'Captain'.

The Lancastrians gave Somerset an army to storm Calais, but first they had to cross the Channel, so the construction of a fleet was started at Sandwich in Kent. In January and May 1460, Warwick made raids on Sandwich and stole the ships. In June, the Lancastrian invasion was pre-empted by an attack on Sandwich, which had been reinforced with several hundred Lancastrian troops commanded by Osbert Mundford. The Yorkist force under Lord Fauconberg, Sir John Wenlock and John Dynham seized the port, capturing troops and armaments. Mundford was captured, taken to Rysbank tower and executed. Warwick left his uncle, Lord Fauconberg, in Sandwich with a small force of Yorkists to act as a bridgehead for his planned invasion of England.

== Battle ==
On 26 June, Warwick, Salisbury and Edward landed at Sandwich with 2,000 men-at-arms. King Henry VI and his Queen, Margaret of Anjou, were at Coventry with their small army. Warwick entered London on 2 July with an army of supporters numbering approximately 10,000.

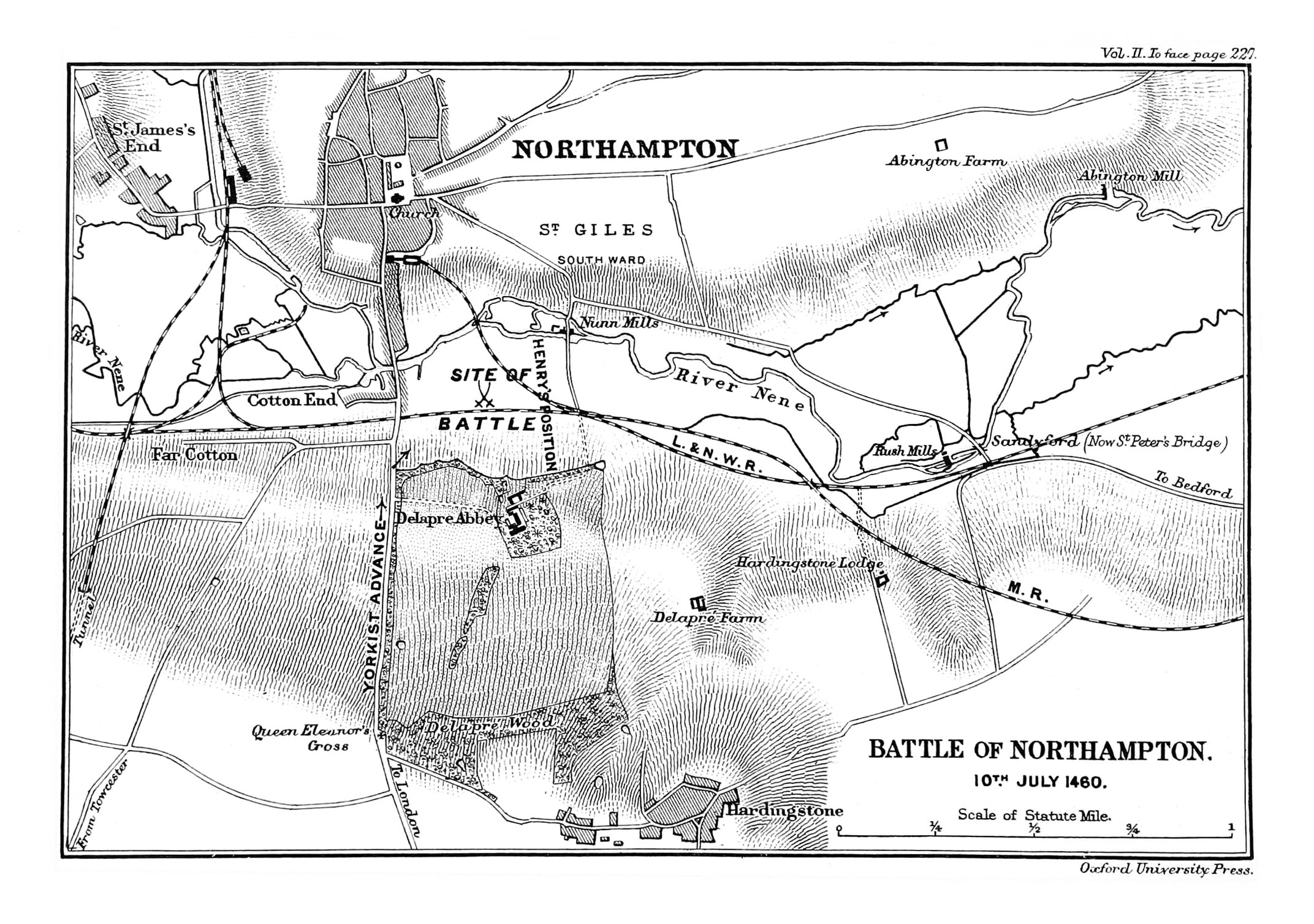
Ramsey's 1892 map of the Battle of Northampton

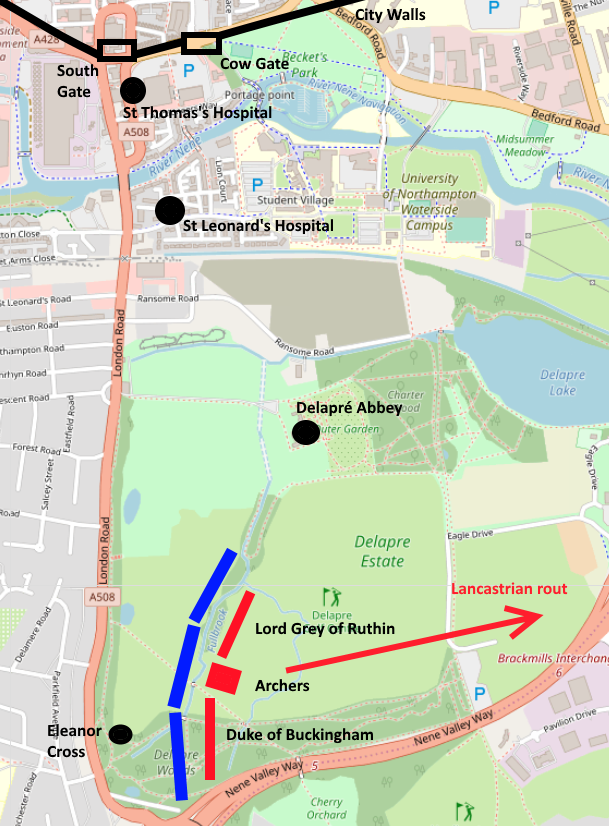
Estimated positions of the Yorkist and Lancastrian armies at Northampton, 10 July 1460

The king's forces took up a defensive position at Northampton, in the grounds of Delapré Abbey. They had constructed an artillery fortification in what is now a mixture of public park and golf course. The position was surrounded by natural watercourses, tributaries of the River Nene, backed by a palisade and gun positions. The defending army was around 5,000 strong, consisting mainly of men-at-arms. The Lancastrians also had some field artillery.

While approaching, Warwick sent a delegate to negotiate with the king on his behalf. The Lancastrian commander, the Duke of Buckingham, replied "The Earl of Warwick shall not come to the King's presence and if he comes he shall die." During Warwick's advance to Northampton he was twice more denied access to the king's person. Once in position, he sent a message to the king saying that "at ii howres after none he wolde speke with hym, or elles dye in the feeld".

At two o'clock the Yorkists advanced. The men were in column, but the hard rain blowing in their faces somewhat hindered them. As they closed with the Lancastrians, Warwick was met by a fierce hail of arrows, but the rain had rendered the Lancastrian collection of cannon quite useless.

When Warwick reached the Lancastrian left flank, commanded by Lord Grey of Ruthin, treachery ensued. Grey had his men lay down their weapons and simply allow the Yorkists to have easy access into the camp beyond. This treachery was the result of a secret message from Lord Grey to March saying that he would change sides if the Yorkists would back him in a property dispute with Henry Holland, 3rd Duke of Exeter (his maternal cousin). Certainly Warwick had ordered his men not to lay violent hands on ordinary soldiers—especially those wearing the black ragged staff of Lord Grey's men. There may also have been inducements and promises of high office by Warwick. Grey became Treasurer of England in 1463. After this, the battle lasted a mere thirty minutes. The defenders were unable to manoeuvre inside the fortifications, and fled the field as their line was rolled up by attacking Yorkists.

The Duke of Buckingham, the Earl of Shrewsbury, Lord Egremont and Lord Beaumont all died trying to save Henry from the Yorkists closing on his tent. Three hundred other Lancastrians were slain in the battle. King Henry VI was captured by an archer, Henry Mountfort.

== Aftermath ==
Henry was found in his tent by Warwick, March and Fauconberg. Showing him proper respect they escorted him to Delapré Abbey, then Northampton, and finally London, where the tower garrison surrendered soon after.

The site is a registered battlefield.

== Bibliography ==
- Goodman, Anthony (1981). The Wars of the Roses: Military Activity and English society, 1452–97. London: Routledge & Kegan Paul. ISBN 9780710007285.
- Griffiths, Ralph A. (1981). The Reign of King Henry VI: The Exercise of Royal Authority, 1422–1461. Berkeley: University of California Press. ISBN 9780520043725.
- Hicks, Michael (2010). The Wars of the Roses. New Haven: Yale University Press. ISBN 9780300114232.
- Ingram, Mike (2015). The Battle of Northampton : 1460. Northampton Battlefields Society. ISBN 978-0-9930777-9-1. OCLC 1064866723.
- Wagner, John A., ed. (2001). Encyclopedia of the Wars of the Roses. Santa Barbara: ABC-CLIO. ISBN 9781576075753.
