= Thomas Clifford, 8th Baron Clifford =

15th-century English noble

Thomas Clifford, 8th Baron de Clifford
- Arms of Clifford: Chequy or and azure, a fess gules
- Born: 25 March 1414
- Died: 22 May 1455 (aged 41); First Battle of Saint Albans
- Noble family: Clifford
- Spouse: Joan Dacre
- Issue: John Clifford, 9th Baron de Clifford; Sir Roger Clifford; Sir Robert Clifford; Sir Thomas Clifford; Elizabeth Clifford; Maud Clifford; Anne Clifford; Joan Clifford; Margaret Clifford
- Father: John Clifford, 7th Baron de Clifford
- Mother: Elizabeth Percy

Thomas Clifford, 8th Baron de Clifford, also 8th Lord of Skipton (25 March 1414 – 22 May 1455), was the elder son of John, 7th Baron de Clifford, and Elizabeth Percy.

== Family ==
Thomas Clifford was born on 25 March 1414, the elder son and heir of John, Lord de Clifford by Elizabeth Percy, daughter of Henry 'Hotspur' Percy and Elizabeth Mortimer, daughter of Edmund Mortimer, 3rd Earl of March. He had a younger brother, Henry Clifford, and two sisters, Mary and Blanche. The Clifford family was seated at Skipton from 1310 to 1676.

== Career ==
Clifford inherited the barony and the title of High Sheriff of Westmorland at the age of seven upon his father's death at the Siege of Meaux on 13 March 1422. He made proof of age in 1435/6.

In 1435 Clifford campaigned with the Duke of Bedford in France, and about 1439 led the English forces which defended Pontoise against Charles VII of France. In 1450/51 he was sent as an embassy for King James II of Scotland.

Clifford was slain fighting on the Lancastrian side at the First Battle of St Albans on 22 May 1455, the first battle in the Wars of the Roses, and was buried at St Alban's Abbey. He was succeeded by his elder son, John, 9th Baron de Clifford.

== Marriage and issue ==
After March 1424 Clifford married Joan Dacre, the daughter of Thomas, 6th Baron Dacre of Gilsland, by Philippa, daughter of Ralph Neville, 1st Earl of Westmorland, by whom he had four sons and five daughters:

- John Clifford, 9th Baron de Clifford, who married Margaret Bromflete, daughter and heiress of Sir Henry Bromflete, Baron Vessy, with whom he had two sons, Henry Clifford, 10th Baron de Clifford, and Richard Clifford, esquire, and a daughter, Elizabeth, who married Robert Aske. He was killed in a skirmish at Ferrybridge on 28 March 1461, the day before the Battle of Towton.
- Sir Roger Clifford, who married Joan Courtenay (born c.1447), the eldest daughter of Thomas Courtenay, 13th Earl of Devon, by Margaret Beaufort, the daughter of John Beaufort, 1st Earl of Somerset. Sir Roger Clifford was beheaded in 1485, and his widow married secondly, Sir William Knyvet of Buckenham, Norfolk.
- Sir Robert Clifford (d. 15 March 1508), who married Elizabeth (née Barley), widow of Sir Ralph Josselyn (d. 25 October 1478), twice Lord Mayor of London, and daughter of William Barley of Aspenden, Hertfordshire by Elizabeth Darcy. Both Sir Robert Clifford and his father-in-law, William Barley, were supporters of the pretender to the Crown, Perkin Warbeck.
- Sir Thomas Clifford.
- Elizabeth Clifford, who married firstly, Sir William Plumpton of Knaresborough, Yorkshire, slain at the Battle of Towton, and secondly, John Hamerton.
- Maud Clifford, who married firstly Sir John Harrington of Hornby, Lancashire, slain at the Battle of Wakefield in 1460, and secondly, Sir Edmund Sutton of Dudley, Staffordshire.
- Anne Clifford, who married firstly, Sir Richard Tempest, and secondly, William Conyers, esquire.
- Joan Clifford, who married Sir Richard Musgrave.
- Margaret Clifford, who married Robert Carre, 12 April 1467, Licence to the rector of Catton to marry inh Conob Cae, domestic servant of Richard 16th Earl of Warwick, and Margaret Clifford. Banns once. Ibid. (Publications of the Surtees Society, Volume 45)

== Shakespeare and Thomas Clifford ==
According to Shakespeare's, Henry VI, Part 3 following Hall's Chronicle and Holinshed's Chronicles, it was Thomas Clifford's son and heir, John Clifford, 9th Baron de Clifford, who slew, in cold blood after the Battle of Wakefield, the young Edmund, Earl of Rutland, son of Richard, 3rd Duke of York, cutting off his head and sending it crowned with paper to Henry VI's wife, Margaret of Anjou, although later authorities state that Lord Rutland had been slain during the battle.

== Ancestry ==
Ancestors of Thomas Clifford, 8th Baron Clifford

16. Robert Clifford, 3rd Baron Clifford
8. Roger Clifford, 5th Baron Clifford
17. Isabel Berkeley
4. Thomas Clifford, 6th Baron Clifford
18. Thomas Beauchamp, 11th Earl of Warwick
9. Maud Beauchamp
19. Katherine Mortimer
2. John Clifford, 7th Baron Clifford
20. William Ros, 3rd Baron Ros
10. Thomas Ros, 4th Baron Ros
21. Margery Badlesmere
5. Elizabeth Ros
22. Ralph Stafford, 1st Earl of Stafford
11. Beatrice Stafford
23. Margaret Audley, 2nd Baroness Audley
1. Thomas Clifford, 8th Baron Clifford
24. Henry Percy, 3rd Baron Percy
12. Henry Percy, 1st Earl of Northumberland
25. Mary of Lancaster
6. Henry Hotspur
26. Ralph Neville, 2nd Baron Neville
13. Margaret Neville
27. Alice Audley
3. Elizabeth Percy
28. Roger Mortimer, 2nd Earl of March
14. Edmund Mortimer, 3rd Earl of March
29. Philippa Montagu
7. Elizabeth Mortimer
30. Lionel of Antwerp, 1st Duke of Clarence
15. Philippa, 5th Countess of Ulster
31. Elizabeth de Burgh, 4th Countess of Ulster

== Notes ==
Peerage of England
Preceded by John Clifford	Baron de Clifford; 1422–1455	Succeeded by John Clifford
