= Barden Old Chapel =

Church in North Yorkshire, England

Coordinates: 54°00′38″N 1°55′25″W

Barden Old Chapel, also known as Barden Tower Chapel or Barden Church, is a historic building in Barden near Skipton in North Yorkshire, in England.

The chapel was constructed in the 16th century, to serve neighbouring Barden Tower. The interior was restored in the 19th century, but later gutted. Despite this the building was occasionally used for worship until the 1950s, but thereafter was boarded up and used only for storage. In 1954, it was grade I listed, but it was later placed on the Heritage at Risk Register. In 2015, the Bolton Abbey Estate restored the building as an events venue.

The single-storey building is constructed of stone and has a stone slate roof. It is two bays long, and is supported by an angle buttress. To the left of the buttress is the doorway, and to its left is a six-light mullioned window. There is a further three-light window in the left wall. Inside, the original font survives, along with metalwork from the 2015 renovation. There is also a kitchen, with cellar below.

== See also ==
- Grade I listed buildings in Craven
- Listed buildings in Barden, Craven
