= John Clifford, 9th Baron Clifford =

15th-century English noble

John Clifford, 9th Baron de Clifford
- Born: 8 April 1435
- Died: 28 March 1461 (aged 25); Battle of Ferrybridge
- Noble family: Clifford
- Spouse: Margaret Bromflete
- Issue: Henry Clifford, 10th Baron de Clifford; Richard Clifford; Elizabeth Aske
- Father: Thomas Clifford, 8th Baron de Clifford
- Mother: Joan Dacre

John Clifford, 9th Baron Clifford, 9th Lord of Skipton (8 April 1435 – 28 March 1461) was a Lancastrian military leader during the Wars of the Roses in England. The Clifford family was one of the most prominent families among the northern English nobility of the fifteenth century, and by the marriages of his sisters, John Clifford had links to some very important families of the time, including the earls of Devon. His father was slain by partisans of the House of York at the first battle of the Wars of the Roses, the Battle of St Albans in 1455. It was probably as a result of his father's death there that Clifford became one of the strongest supporters of Queen Margaret, who ended up as the effective leader of the Lancastrian faction because of the illness of her husband, King Henry VI.

Clifford had already achieved prominence in the north where, as an ally of the son of the earl of Northumberland, he took part in a feud against the Neville family, the Percy's natural rivals in Yorkshire. This consisted of a series of armed raids, assaults and skirmishes, and included an ambush on one of the younger Nevilles' wedding parties in 1453. Historians have seen a direct connection between his involvement in the local feud in the north with the Nevilles, and his involvement in the national struggle against the duke of York, with whom the Nevilles were closely allied in the late 1450s. Although this was supposedly a period of temporary peace between the factions, Clifford and his allies appear to have made numerous attempts to ambush the Neville and Yorkist lords.

Armed conflict erupted again in 1459, and again Clifford was found on the side of King Henry and Queen Margaret. Clifford took part in the parliament that attainted the Yorkists – by now in exile – and he took a share of the profits from their lands, as well as being appointed to offices traditionally in their keeping. The Yorkist lords returned from exile in June 1460 and subsequently defeated a royal army at Northampton. As a result of the royalist defeat, Clifford was ordered to surrender such castles and offices as he had from the Nevilles back to them, although it is unlikely that he did so. In fact, he and his fellow northern Lancastrian lords merely commenced a campaign of destruction on Neville and Yorkist estates and tenantry, to such an extent that in December 1460, the duke of York and his close ally, the earl of Salisbury, raised an army and headed north to crush the Lancastrian rebellion. This winter campaign culminated in the Battle of Wakefield in the last days of the year, and was a decisive victory for the Lancastrian army, of which Clifford was by now an important commander. The battle resulted in the deaths of both York and Salisbury, but was probably most notorious for Clifford's slaying of Edmund, Earl of Rutland, York's seventeen-year-old second son and the younger brother of the future King Edward IV. This may have resulted in Clifford's being nicknamed 'Butcher Clifford', although historians disagree as to how widely used by contemporaries this term was.

Clifford accompanied the royal army on its march south early the next year, where, although wounded, he played a leading part in the second Battle of St Albans, and then afterwards with the Queen to the north. The Yorkist army, now under the command of Edward of York and Richard, Earl of Warwick, pursued the Lancastrians to Yorkshire and eventually defeated them at the Battle of Towton on 29 March 1461. Clifford though was not present; he had been slain in a skirmish with a Yorkist advance party the previous day. Following the coronation of the by-then victorious Edward IV, he was attainted and his lands confiscated by the Crown.

== Background, youth, marriage and family ==
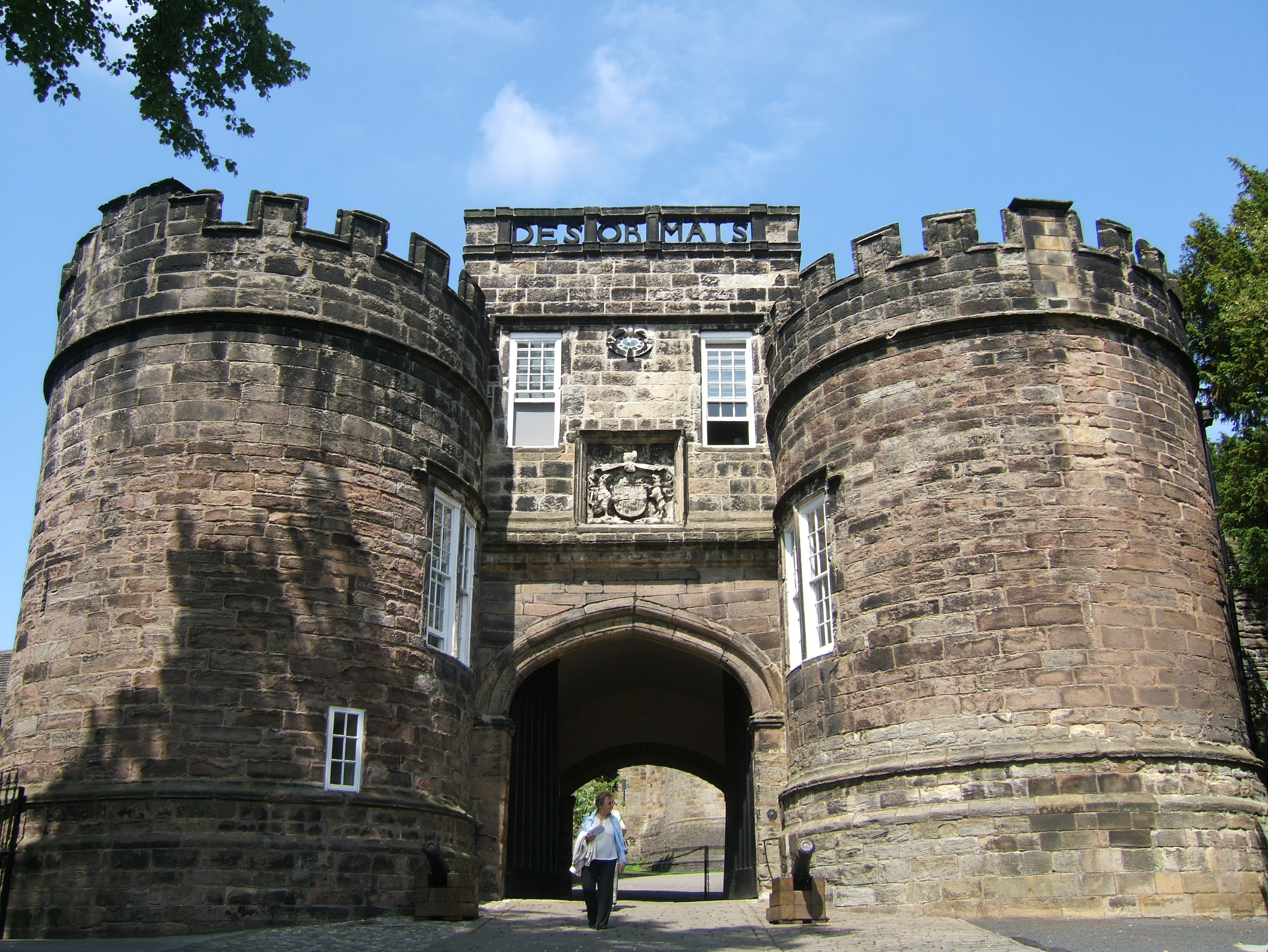
Skipton Castle, seat of the Clifford family; Craven has been described as "wild, economically backward and chronically lawless."

The Clifford family has been described as one of the greatest fifteenth-century families "never to receive an earldom." John Clifford was born and baptised at Conisborough Castle on 8 April 1435, the son of Thomas Clifford, 8th Baron Clifford (1414–1455) by his wife Joan Dacre (bef. 1424 – bef. 1455). She was the daughter of Thomas de Dacre, 6th Baron Dacre of Gilsland, and Philippa de Neville, daughter of Ralph Neville, 1st Earl of Westmorland. One of his godparents was his great-aunt Maud Clifford, Countess of Cambridge, whose dower house was Coningsburgh Castle. When she died in 1446, she left him numerous silver plate in her will. She had been the widow of Richard of Conisburgh, 3rd Earl of Cambridge, executed on 5 August 1415 for his part in the Southampton Plot, and she was said to have lived "in great estate" in the castle.

Clifford had three younger brothers and five sisters. Sir Roger Clifford, who married Joan Courtenay (born c. 1447), the eldest daughter of Thomas de Courtenay, 5th Earl of Devon, by Margaret Beaufort, the daughter of John Beaufort, 1st Earl of Somerset. She married secondly, Sir William Knyvet of Buckenham, Norfolk. Next was Sir Robert Clifford, who eventually involved himself in the Perkin Warbeck plot against Henry VII. John Clifford's youngest brother was Sir Thomas Clifford, and his nearest sister was Elizabeth. She married firstly, Sir William Plumpton (1435–1461), who was probably slain at the Battle of Towton in 1461, and secondly, John Hamerton. Another sister was Maud, who married firstly Sir John Harrington, and secondly, Sir Edmund Sutton. There was also Anne Clifford, who married firstly, Sir William Tempest, and secondly, William Conyers, esquire. John Clifford's youngest sisters were Joan (who married Sir Simon Musgrave) and Margaret (who married Robert Carr).

In 1454, John Clifford married Margaret Bromflete (1443 – 12 April 1493), who was the only daughter and heir of Sir Henry Bromflete, Baron Vessy, and his second wife Eleanor FitzHugh. With her, Clifford had two sons and a daughter; his heir, Henry, who would become 10th baron, a younger son Richard, and a daughter Elizabeth. Elizabeth was later the wife of Sir Robert Aske (d. 21 February 1531) of Aughton, Yorkshire. Margaret Clifford survived her husband, and at some time before 14 May 1467 had remarried, to Sir Lancelot Threlkeld. Historian Henry Summerson has described his marriage, which gained the Cliffords estates, as he put it, "in parts of the north relatively free from Neville domination."

== Early career ==
Little is known of Clifford's early life or career until he appears on the records of 24 August 1453, as supporting the traditional allies of his family, the Percy family. The Percys were at that time engaged in a bitter feud – known as the Percy–Neville feud by historians – with their rivals for power in Yorkshire, the House of Neville. On this day Clifford joined Thomas Percy, Lord Egremont and Sir Richard Percy, sons of the earl of Northumberland, at Heworth Moor in their attempt to ambush the returning wedding party of Thomas Neville.

Clifford's career was transformed when, on 22 May 1455, his father was killed fighting Richard, Duke of York and York's Neville allies, the earls of Salisbury and Warwick at the first Battle of St Albans. John Clifford was still under age at the time, and was not able to prove his age in order to obtain livery of his lands until 16 June 1456. He entered into his inheritance less than a month later, and was appointed a Justice of the peace in Westmorland. Clifford inherited the barony of Clifford, the family seat at Skipton Castle and the hereditary office of High Sheriff of Westmorland. He was summoned to Parliament on 30 July 1460.

It is likely that for him, the death of his father personalised an already bitter struggle with the Nevilles. Michael Hicks, for example, has suggested that "the heirs of the dead lords... now wanted revenge for their fathers' deaths. They were not particular whether by constitutional trial or by assassination." Warwick especially was held accountable. King Henry VI imposed a reconciliation between the warring factions of St Albans in early 1458, and commanded the various parties, including Clifford, to London. Clifford arrived there, a contemporary chronicler recorded, "with a grete power," and demanded compensation for his father's death. In this, he was accompanied by the other "yong lordes whoos fadres were sleyne at Seynt Albonys." Jointly with Lord Egremont and the new earl of Northumberland, Clifford is believed to have had an army of around 1,500 men in London in early 1458 where, with Egremont and the duke of Exeter, he attempted to ambush Warwick and York on their way to Westminster. It is likely that they had organised armed gangs for the purpose of arresting the Yorkist lords, if not assassinating them. The Mayor of London believed they came "agaynst the peas," and excluded them from the city. Thus, Clifford and the others were forced to lodge at Temple Bar, between the city and Westminster, probably in a house of one of the various bishops that lined the route. The king, as arbitrator, resided out of London, at Berkhamsted Castle, and Clifford visited him there on 1 March – "presumably to influence the result [but] probably unsuccessfully," says Hicks. Clifford later participated in what was known ceremonially as the 'Loveday' on the 24th of the month, which saw the king arbitrate a settlement between the warring parties. As a result of this, and as part of a general compensation package between the families of the battle's victors and losers, Clifford was to be paid £666 by the earl of Warwick. This was to be shared between John and his siblings.

King Henry's attempts at peacekeeping, however, came to little; indeed, it was around this time that Henry's forcible wife, Margaret of Anjou, became more involved in the partisan politics of the day and increasingly influential in government. Summerson has noted how Clifford's youth and energy "made him an increasingly important supporter of the Lancastrian cause." Likewise, a pro-Lancastrian poem, using a favoured contemporary metaphor for government, the ship of State, referred to Clifford as a "well good sayl" of it. A few months later he was appointed to the King's Bench for the West Riding of Yorkshire, but when a great council was summoned for October 1458, it seems that Clifford – along with other anti-York peers such as the dukes of Somerset and Exeter – were excluded from it.

== The Wars of the Roses ==
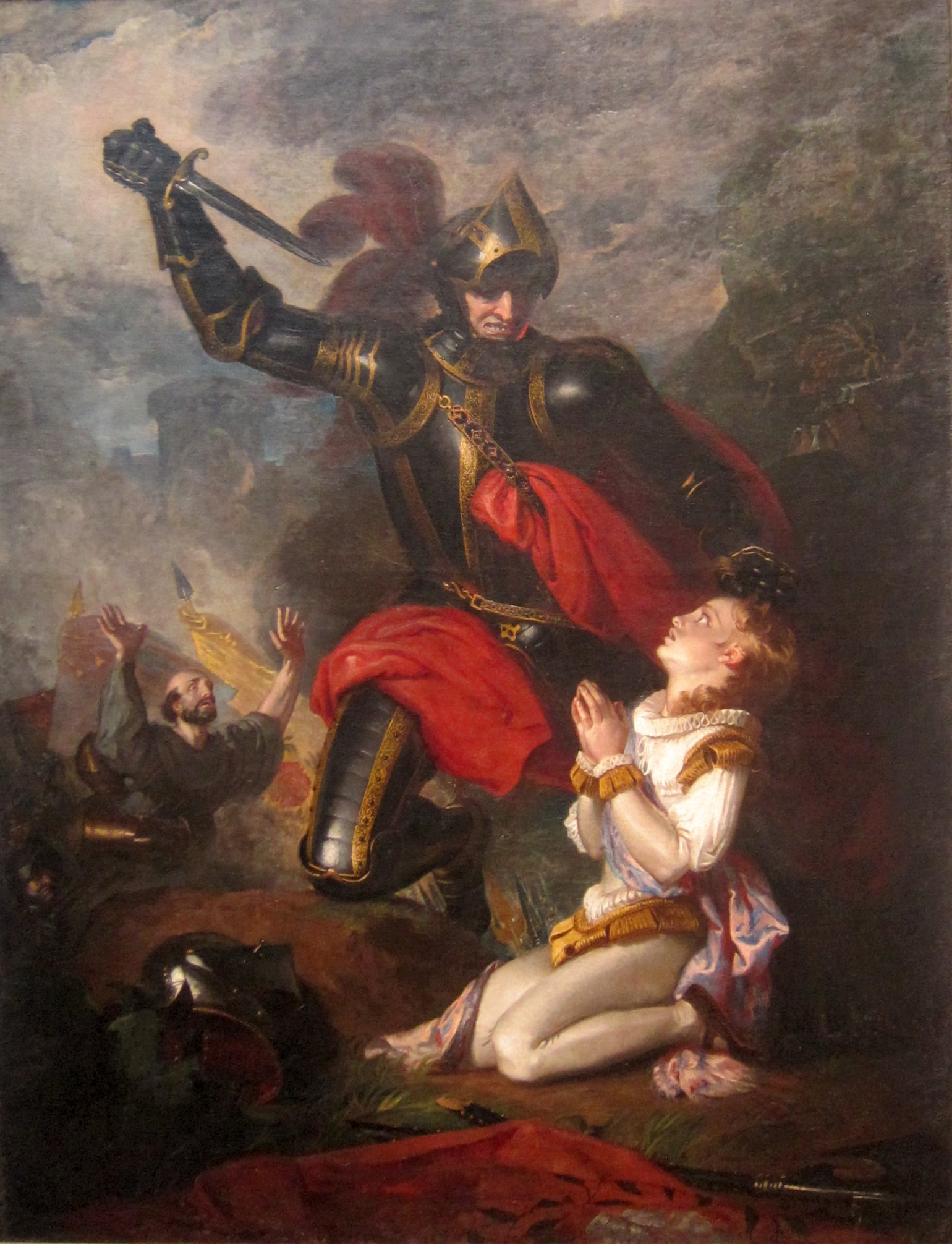
The Murder of Rutland by Lord Clifford by Charles Robert Leslie, 1815

The next point at which Clifford appears to have been fully involved in national politics was attending the parliament summoned to Coventry in November 1459. By this time the civil wars had broken out again in earnest: the Neville earl of Salisbury had defeated an attempted Lancastrian ambush of him at the Battle of Blore Heath that September, and had joined with the duke of York at the latter's castle in Ludlow. There, however, they had been forced into exile by superior crown forces, and as a result, a parliament had been called to attend to the Yorkists' attainders. This was the Parliament of Devils, and here Clifford swore allegiance to the new heir to the throne, Edward of Westminster, Prince of Wales, on 11 December. As a result of the exiled Yorkists' attainders, their estates were available for redistribution by the crown to those who had remained loyal to it, and Clifford was granted the Honour of Penrith and the Penrith Castle, which had formerly been held by Salisbury. This was close enough to their own estates Westmorland – particularly their caput of Brougham Castle, near Penrith – that it has been suggested that it had been a particular bone of contention between the two families. In April the following year he was appointed warden of the western marches, an important position in the defence of the Anglo-Scottish border. It was also a traditional office of the Nevilles, and had most recently been held jointly by the earls of Salisbury and Warwick; now Clifford was ordered to raise a force to resist the Yorkists.

In June 1460 the exiled Yorkists successfully invaded England, and on 10 July they defeated a royal army at the Battle of Northampton, and captured the king. As a result, Clifford was now ordered to surrender Penrith castle and Honour back to the earl of Salisbury. But although the now-Yorkist government repeatedly sent messages, orders and instructions to Clifford in the north, he did not acknowledge them, and with Northumberland and Lord Roos, remained in control of most of the region. In October 1460, the duke of York claimed the throne, and a parliament was summoned to discuss this. The result of its deliberations was the Act of Accord, which disinherited the Prince of Wales in favour of York and his heirs. This, it has been said, was 'repugnant' to Clifford and his colleagues and strengthened their support for the queen. It seems that, although Clifford was summoned to attend, he stayed away, and probably met with Queen Margaret in Kingston upon Hull, where she was gathering Lancastrian lords and their retainers to her. Together, they had soon gathered a fighting force of thousands. Clifford was one of these lords who was subsequently accused of 'systematically' pillaging and looting the Yorkshire estates and tenants of York and Salisbury. In response to these attacks, York, Salisbury, and the latter's son Thomas led an army to the north. Encamped at York's castle at Sandal, on 30 December 1460, the two armies met at the Battle of Wakefield, where Clifford commanded one of the wings of the Lancastrian army. The Yorkist army was routed, and all three Yorkist lords were killed. Clifford was knighted by the Lancastrian commander, Henry Beaufort, Duke of Somerset prior to the battle commencing.

=== Death of the earl of Rutland ===
One modern historian has noted, however, that although Rutland's death brought Clifford "considerable notoriety, much of it [was] first reported only several decades after the event." Henry Summerson dates the first published description of 'Butcher Clifford' as being not until the 1540s, by John Leland in his Itinerary, when he wrote that "for killing of men at this bataill [Clifford] was caullid the boucher." The annalist William Worcester, writing contemporaneously says that Clifford killed Rutland on Wakefield Bridge, whilst the latter fled the battle. In the sixteenth century, this report was expanded by Edward Hall, which became the source of Shakespeare's account. This included the addition of various confirmed historical inaccuracies, such as describing Rutland as being aged twelve rather than seventeen, and that Clifford also beheaded York after the battle, whereas the duke almost certainly fell in the fighting. Historian J.R. Lander has said that most of the later descriptions of Clifford at Wakefield "appear too late to be worthy of much credence".

== Death and attainder ==
Following the victory at Wakefield, Clifford and other Lancastrian lords in the north attended Queen Margaret's Royal council in January; they soon led their army south. Gregory's Chronicle reports that everyone wore the Prince of Wales' cognizance, the ostrich feather badge. On 17 February 1461 they encountered a Yorkist army, led by Warwick and his brother John Neville, at St Albans. This resulted in another resounding victory for the Lancastrians, and Henry VI was captured from Warwick and returned to his wife and son. It is possible that this reunion occurred in John Clifford's own tent after the battle. Instead of marching on London however, the royal army retreated to the north, Clifford with it, and a Yorkist force slowly trailing them from London. On 28 March 1461 portions of the two armies clashed whilst attempting to cross the River Aire at Ferrybridge, now called the Battle of Ferrybridge. The Lancastrian force, under Clifford, captured the bridge, but the Yorkists had forded the river upstream and flank-attacked Clifford's men. Traditionally, Clifford was killed at Dittingdale, possibly by a headless arrow in the throat, and buried in a common burial pit, along with the rest of the dead from that encounter. Despite being only a few miles away, the main Lancastrian army held its position and either did not or could not come to his aid.

The day after Clifford's death the bulk of the Yorkist and Lancastrian armies faced each other at the Battle of Towton. After what is now considered the biggest and possibly bloodiest battle ever to take place on English soil, the Lancastrians were routed, and the son of the duke of York was crowned King Edward IV. On 4 November 1461, at Edward's first parliament, Clifford was attainted and his estates and barony forfeited to the king; a large portion was later granted to the earl of Warwick. The story – which would later be repeated by George Edward Cokayne in his Complete Peerage – of how Clifford's widow, fearing her son, Henry, would be slain in retaliation for Rutland's death, sent him into hiding as a shepherd, is almost certainly a folklore. As Dr James Ross has pointed out, the young Henry Clifford was pardoned in 1472, and as early as 1466 was named publicly as receiving a bequest, although Ross does suggest that Henry may well have gone into hiding for a time from his father's enemies.

== Fictional portrayals and later reputation ==
According to Shakespeare's play Henry VI, Part 3, following Hall's Chronicle and Holinshed's Chronicles, John Clifford, after the Battle of Wakefield, slew in cold blood the young Edmund, Earl of Rutland, son of Richard, 3rd Duke of York. However, later authorities state that Rutland was slain during the battle.

Clifford is depicted in Sharon Kay Penman's historical novel, The Sunne in Splendour.

Peerage of England
Preceded by Thomas Clifford	Baron de Clifford; 1455–1461	Succeeded by Henry Clifford
