= Edmund, Earl of Rutland =

English nobleman

Edmund of York
- Earl of Rutland
- Born: 17 May 1443; Rouen, Normandy, France
- Died: 30 December 1460 (aged 17); Wakefield, Yorkshire, England
- Burial: 30 July 1476; Church of St Mary and All Saints, Fotheringhay, Northamptonshire
- House: York
- Father: Richard, 3rd Duke of York
- Mother: Cecily Neville

Edmund, Earl of Rutland (17 May 1443 – 30 December 1460), was the fourth child and second surviving son of Richard Plantagenet, 3rd Duke of York, and Cecily Neville. He was a younger brother of Edward, Earl of March, the future King Edward IV who came to the throne in 1461, the year after Edmund's death. He was born in Rouen, then the capital of English-occupied France and his father held the office of Lieutenant of France. He was killed at the age of 17 either during or shortly after the Battle of Wakefield, during the Wars of the Roses.

He was created Earl of Rutland by King Henry VI probably at some time before 1454, aged about 11, as Edmund and his elder brother Edward signed a letter to their father on 14 June 1454 as "E. Rutland" and "E. Marche". No record of the creation survives.

== Lord Chancellor of Ireland ==
In 1451, Edmund's father, who held the title of Lord Lieutenant of Ireland, appointed Edmund as Lord Chancellor of Ireland. As Edmund was underage, the duties of the position were held by Deputy Chancellors. His first Deputy Chancellor was Edmund Oldhall, Bishop of Meath. His brother Sir William Oldhall was Chamberlain to the Duke of York and was likely behind that appointment. He acted as de facto Chancellor until 1454.

Oldhall was replaced by John Talbot, 2nd Earl of Shrewsbury, who also held the office of Lord High Steward of Ireland. He would continue serving as the de facto Chancellor until his death at the Battle of Northampton (10 July 1460).

His appointment and those of his Deputies were acknowledged by the Parliament of Ireland which at this time first asserted its independence. The Parliament declared that Ireland held separate legislature from the Kingdom of England and its subjects were only subject to the laws and statutes of "the Lords Spiritual and Temporal and Commons of Ireland, freely admitted and accepted in their Parliaments and Great Councils".

According to Parliamentary decisions during his term, the Irish subjects were only bound to answer writs by the Great Seal of Ireland, held by the Lord Chancellors. Any officer attempting to enforce the rule of decrees from England would lose all of his property in Ireland and be subject to a fine.

The House of York in Ireland had won the support of Thomas FitzGerald, 7th Earl of Kildare, and James FitzGerald, 6th Earl of Desmond. Several allies of the FitzGeralds followed them in their loyalties. On the other hand, the House of Lancaster found its main Irish supporter in the person of James Butler, 5th Earl of Ormond.

== Death ==
Edmund died at the age of seventeen either during or shortly after the Battle of Wakefield (30 December 1460) during the Wars of the Roses. He had fought in the battle at the side of his father. After the tide of battle turned against his father he attempted to escape over Wakefield Bridge, but was overtaken and killed, possibly by the Lancastrian John Clifford, 9th Baron Clifford, to avenge Clifford's father's death at the First Battle of St Albans.

By the account given by Roderick O'Flanagan in his 1870 biography of Edmund:

Urged by his tutor, a priest named Robert Aspell, he was no sooner aware that the field was lost than he sought safety by flight. Their movements were intercepted by the Lancastrians, and Lord Clifford made him prisoner, but did not then know his rank. Struck with the richness of his armour and equipment, Lord Clifford demanded his name. "Save him", implored the Chaplain; "for he is the Prince's son, and peradventure may do you good hereafter."
This was an impolitic appeal, for it denoted hopes of the House of York being again in the ascendant, which the Lancastrians, flushed with recent victory, regarded as impossible. The ruthless noble swore a solemn oath: "Thy father", said he, "slew mine; and so will I do thee and all thy kin;" and with these words he rushed on the hapless youth, and drove his dagger to the hilt in his heart. Thus fell, at the early age of seventeen, Edmund Plantagenet, Earl of Rutland, Lord Chancellor of Ireland.

However this story does not appear in any of the accounts of the battle written by the chroniclers of the time.

Edmund was possibly executed on the orders of the Lancastrian Lord Clifford, or by some accounts, by Lord Clifford himself. His head was displayed spiked upon the gate of York, Micklegate Bar, along with those of his father and of his uncle, Richard Neville, 5th Earl of Salisbury.

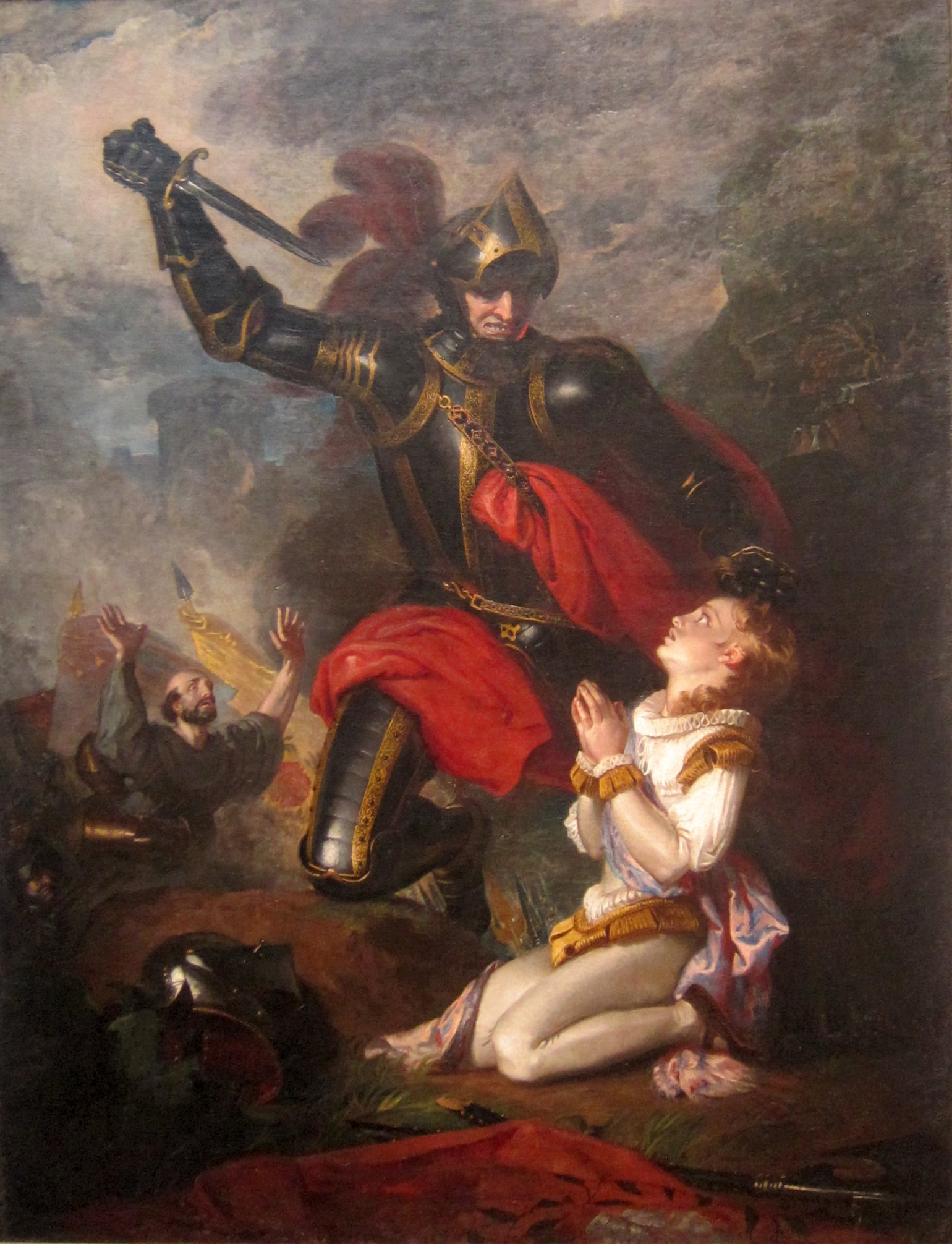
The Murder of Rutland by Lord Clifford by Charles Robert Leslie (1794–1859). Pennsylvania Academy of the Fine Arts.

Edmund and his father were buried at Pontefract Priory. The bodies were reburied, with great pomp, in the family vault at Fotheringhay Church on 29–30 July 1476.

Lord Clifford was slain in March 1461 at the Battle of Ferrybridge.

== In popular culture ==
In Shakespeare's play, Henry VI, Part 3, Rutland is portrayed as a young boy who is brutally murdered by Clifford after pleading for his life; the source appears to be Edward Hall's 1548 Chronicle, which says, incorrectly, that Rutland is "scarce of the age of twelve years" at his death.

In Sharon Kay Penman's revisionist historical novel The Sunne in Splendour, Edmund is portrayed as a brave, sensitive and wise young man who mentors his youngest brother, Richard, and whose tragic death haunts his oldest brother, Edward, long after he becomes king.

== Arms ==
Coat of arms of Edmund, Earl of Rutland
Notes Edmund of York used the arms of the kingdom, differentiated by a label argent per pale lions purpure (for his paternal great-grandmother, Isabel of Castile) and torteaux (presumably three each) gules (for York). Adopted c. 1454 Escutcheon Quarterly, 1st, quarterly, 1st and 4th, France ancien, 2nd and 3rd England, with a label of five points Argent the two dexter points charged with lions rampant purpure and three sinister points each with three torteaux, 2nd and 3rd de Burgh, 4th Mortimer. Symbolism Both Edward (later King Edward IV) and Edmund quartered the arms of de Burgh and Mortimer, emphasising their descent from Lionel of Antwerp, on which Edward's Yorkist claim to the throne was based. These quarterings were used by his niece Catherine of York, Countess of Devon, and can be seen sculpted on the south porch of Tiverton Church in Devon.

== Ancestors ==
Ancestors of Edmund, Earl of Rutland

8. Edmund of Langley, 1st Duke of York
4. Richard of Conisburgh, 3rd Earl of Cambridge
9. Isabella of Castile
2. Richard Plantagenet, 3rd Duke of York
10. Roger Mortimer, 4th Earl of March
5. Anne de Mortimer
11. Alianore Holland
1. Edmund, Earl of Rutland
12. John Neville, 3rd Baron Neville de Raby
6. Ralph Neville, 1st Earl of Westmorland
13. Maud Percy
3. Cecily Neville
14. John of Gaunt, 1st Duke of Lancaster
7. Joan Beaufort
15. Katherine Swynford

Legal offices
Preceded by Walter Devereux	Lord Chancellor of Ireland; 1451–1460 with deputies Edmund Oldhall (1451–1454) and John Talbot, 2nd Earl of Shrewsbury (1454–1460)	Succeeded by John Dynham
