= Listed buildings in Barden, Craven =

Barden is a civil parish in the county of North Yorkshire, England. It contains 17 listed buildings that are recorded in the National Heritage List for England. Of these, three are listed at Grade I, the highest of the three grades, and the others are at Grade II, the lowest grade. The parish does not contain any significant settlements, and consists of countryside and moorland, mainly along the valley of the River Wharfe. The most important buildings in the parish are Barden Tower, a ruined tower house, and associated buildings, all of which are listed at Grade I. The other listed buildings consist of farmhouses and farm buildings, houses, and a bridge.

== Key ==
Grade	Criteria
I	Buildings of exceptional interest, sometimes considered to be internationally important
II	Buildings of national importance and special interest

== Buildings ==
Name and location	Photograph	Date	Notes	Grade
Barden Tower; 54.01079°N 1.92389°W		c. 1500	A tower house now in ruins, it is in stone and without a roof. There is a rectangular plan with an L-shaped extension on the southeast. The main part has three storeys and four bays. The openings have chamfered surrounds, the doorways have four-centred arched heads, and the windows are either lancets or mullioned, some with hood moulds and relieving arches.	I
Barden Church; 54.01044°N 1.92347°W	—	1515––17	The chapel is in stone with a band, a parapet with moulded coping, and a stone slate roof. There is a single storey and two bays. The doorway has a four-centred arch, and the windows are moulded, chamfered and mullioned, with elliptical-headed lights and hood moulds.	I
Priest's House; 54.01055°N 1.92342°W		16th century	The building is in stone with a stone slate roof. There are three bays. The right bay a three-stage tower with a parapet, a crocketed pinnacle on the corners, and a large stepped buttress. The left two bays are lower, and have parapeted gables. The windows have chamfered surrounds, and either a single light, or are mullioned with elliptical-headed lights. The doorway has a chamfered surround and an elliptical head.	I
Cruck Barn, Drebley Cottage; 54.02820°N 1.92188°W	—	16th century	The barn has a cruck frame, it is encased in stone with quoins, and has a corrugated iron roof. There is a single storey and three bays. The barn contains a projecting cart entrance, a stable door and windows. Inside there are three massive full-height cruck trusses.	II
Barn southwest of Drebley Farm; 54.02756°N 1.92158°W	—	16th century	The barn is in stone and has a heather thatched roof covered in corrugated iron. There is a single storey and four bays. On the left is a projecting wagon entrance with a stone slate roof, and to the right is a doorway and a casement window. Inside there are three cruck trusses.	II
Barden Scale Cottage; 54.00669°N 1.92285°W	—	17th century	The cottage is in stone with quoins and a stone slate roof. There are two storeys and three bays. In the centre is a doorway with a chamfered surround and triangular arch under a square head. The windows are double-chamfered with two or three lights, one with a hood mould.	II
Barden Scale Farmhouse; 54.00638°N 1.92203°W	—	17th century	The farmhouse is in stone with quoins and a stone slate roof. There are two storeys and three bays. The doorway has a chamfered surround and a basket-arched lintel. The windows are double-chamfered with two to four lights, those in the ground floor under a continuous hood mould.	II
Crossfield House; 54.02916°N 1.90691°W	—	17th century	A stone house with a stone slate roof, two storeys and three bays. In the centre is a doorway with a chamfered surround, and the windows are chamfered with mullions with two to four lights.	II
Fold House Farmhouse; 54.02888°N 1.91968°W	—	17th century	The farmhouse is in stone with quoins and a slate roof. There are two storeys and three bays. In the left bay is a doorway with a chamfered surround and a massive lintel, and the other bays contain chamfered mullioned windows, those in the ground floor with hood moulds.	II
Little Gate Farmhouse; 54.02844°N 1.92099°W	—	17th century	A stone farmhouse with a slate roof, two storeys and four bays. The doorway has a chamfered surround and a triangular head. In the ground floor are mullioned windows, one with a hood mould, and in the upper floor are sash windows.	II
Barden Bridge; 54.01260°N 1.92186°W		1676	The bridge carries a road over the River Wharfe, and was rebuilt after the previous bridge was destroyed in 1673. It is in stone, and consists of three segmental arches with voussoirs and hood moulds. The cutwaters have a triangular section, and rise to form pedestrian refuges. At the east end of the north parapet is an inscription.	II
Barn northwest of Watergate; 54.01575°N 1.91799°W	—	Early 18th century	The barn is in stone with quoins and a corrugated sheet roof. There is a single storey and three bays. The openings include doorways, windows and a dormer.	II
Wood End Farmhouse; 54.03626°N 1.94287°W	—	18th century	The farmhouse is in stone with a stone slate roof, two storeys and two bays. In the centre is a doorway with a plain surround, and the windows are mullioned with three lights, and contain sashes or fixed lights.	II
Gamsworth Farmhouse and barn 54.02279°N 1.91555°W	—	Late 18th century	The farmhouse and the barn attached to the left are in stone with a stone slate roof. The house has quoins, two storeys and two bays. The doorway has a plain surround, the ground floor windows are sashes and in the upper floor are two-light mullioned windows. The barn has a large central buttress and a segmental-headed door.	II
Laund House Farmhouse; 54.00105°N 1.88934°W		Late 18th to early 19th century	The farmhouse and the barn attached to the left are in stone with a stone slate roof, and each has two storeys and three bays. On the front of the house are a porch, a doorway, sash windows and three-light mullioned windows. The barn has an L-shaped plan, the left bay gabled. It contains a wagon door under an elliptical arch with voussoirs, a stable door, a casement window, and cross-shaped vents.	II
Holme House Farmhouse; 54.01028°N 1.91745°W		Early 19th century	The farmhouse is in stone with a stone slate roof, two storeys and three bays. In the centre is a doorway with a plain surround, and the windows are mullioned and contain sashes.	II
Eastwood Head Farmhouse; 54.03663°N 1.89364°W	—	Mid 19th century	A stone farmhouse with a slate roof, two storeys and four bays. The doorway has a chamfered surround, a four-centred arched head, a fanlight and a hood mould. The windows are chamfered, either with a single light, or with mullions and two or three lights.	II
