= Barden Tower =

Medieval building in North Yorkshire, England

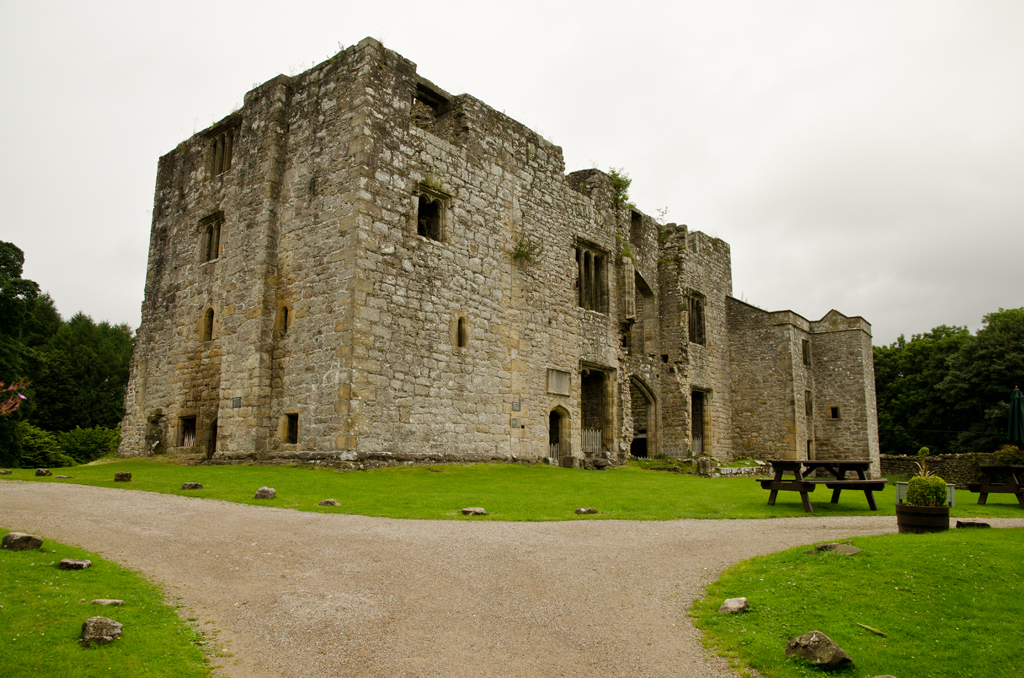
- Barden Tower

- Location within North Yorkshire
- 54.0107°N 1.9239°W
- Type: Fortified House
- Location: Barden, North Yorkshire
- Nearest city: Bradford, West Yorkshire
- OS grid reference: SE050572

History
- Founded: c.1485-1490
- Founder: Henry Clifford

Site notes
- Elevation: 492 feet (150 m)
- Restored: c.1678
- Restored by: Anne Clifford
- Current use: Tower derelict House used as cafe
- Owner: Bolton Abbey Estate

Barden Tower is a ruined building in the Parish of Barden, in Wharfedale, North Yorkshire, England. The tower was used as a hunting lodge in the 15th and 16th centuries, and despite a renovation in the 1650s, it fell into disrepair in the 18th century. The tower is now part of the Bolton Estate and is listed as a medieval fortified tower. Along with other buildings on the Bolton Estate, it is a focal point and many people visit the tower. It is also a way marker on the 100-mile (160 km) Lady Anne's Way long distance path.

== History ==
The tower is located equidistant between Bolton Bridge on the A59 road to the south, and the village of Burnsall to the north (4 miles (6.4 km) each way). A lodge of sorts had been located in the Forest of Barden since early Plantagenet times, but it was rebuilt in stone c.1485–1490 by Henry Clifford, who was also known as the Lord Shepherd. (Note: This was a legend borne out by the supposition that as a boy, Clifford was at risk from his father's enemies and so was raised in shepherd's houses in and around Craven and Wharfedale. Modern scholars have cast doubt on this tale, although it is generally agreed that he was disinherited from his father's titles and estates after John Clifford was killed before the Battle of Towton. Henry Clifford was awarded the estates back after King Richard was killed in 1485 at the Battle of Bosworth.) Clifford chose the area around Barden as his main residence over his castle at Skipton. Barden Tower was one of six forest lodges which were in the possession of the Clifford family between the 14th and 17th centuries. Besides Barden, the Cliffords had lodges at Drebley, Gamsworth, Howgill and Laund. The sixth lodge at a site known as Ungaine, has not yet been identified. (Note: Speight lays claim to Ungaine (Ungayne) being directly east of the Priory at Bolton on the left bank of the river.) The tower became the focal point for the hamlets and farmhouses in the area; because there was no nuclear village to gather to, the tower became a de facto village centre.

The tower, along with the chapel next to it and Skipton Castle, were renovated and rebuilt by Lady Anne Clifford in the 1650s. The tower had been "de-roofed" during the Civil War; the roof was believed to have been made of thatch (a request from the 15th century states a claim for "soddes for the towre toppe [sic]"). It was in the 16th and 17th centuries that the outbuildings of a farmhouse and chapel were built next to the tower. The priesthouse has been tentatively dated to 1513, and was reputedly built by Henry Clifford for his private chaplain when the Clifford household were in residence at the tower. After Lady Anne's death in 1676, the estates and Barden Tower were taken over by the Earls of Cork and fell into disrepair in the 18th century. The tower has been in a ruinous state for over 200 years.

During the Jacobite rising of 1745, a band of militia were garrisoned at the tower to defend the area against the Scots army, should they so be needed. 150 men with pikes, staffs, halberts and drums were recorded as being present at the tower. Whilst the Jacobite Army did go through Yorkshire, there is no record of Barden Tower being involved in any skirmishes.

The second roof was made out of lead, and it was de-roofed again c. 1800, but the buildings were still the focal point for those who lived around it, which had become easier since the opening of Barden Bridge in 1659. There was a school and a chapel at the site, which were both used well into the 20th century (the chapel was last used in the 1960s for Anglican worship). Baptisms and burials were not permitted to take place at the chapel next to the tower, but marriages were conducted there.

In 1881, a 3,500-tonne (3,900-ton) steam ship was named Barden Tower on the River Tyne in Northumberland. She sank in the English Channel in 1893.

All three historical buildings on the site were grade I listed in 1954. The Priesthouse part of the buildings was converted in 2016 into a restaurant and wedding venue. The whole area around the tower, the land underneath the buildings and the tower, are listed together collectively as an ancient monument. It is a popular location for tourists and visitors, and is well signposted from the walks in the area, particularly those along the River Wharfe.

== See also ==
- Grade I listed buildings in North Yorkshire (district)
- Listed buildings in Barden, Craven

== Gallery ==
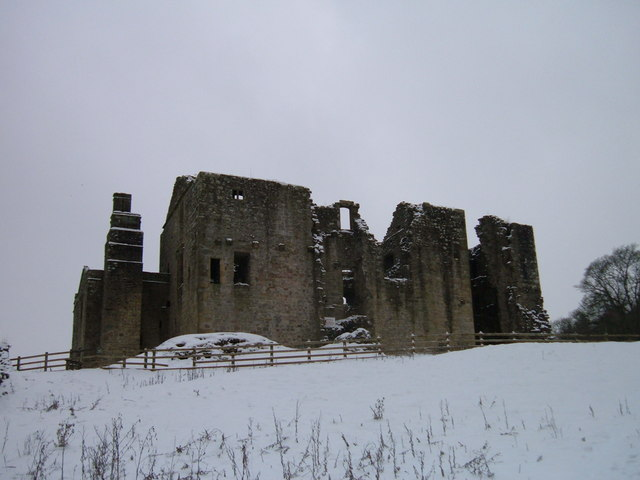
Barden Tower rear

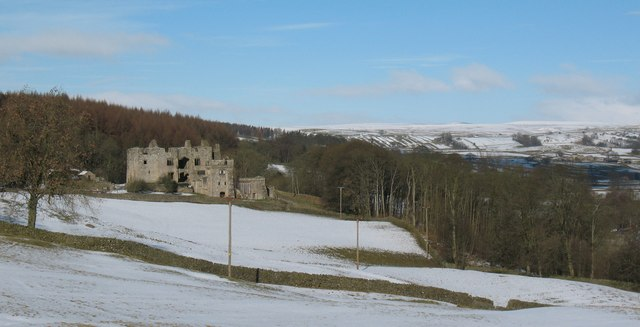
Barden Tower from Barden Scale

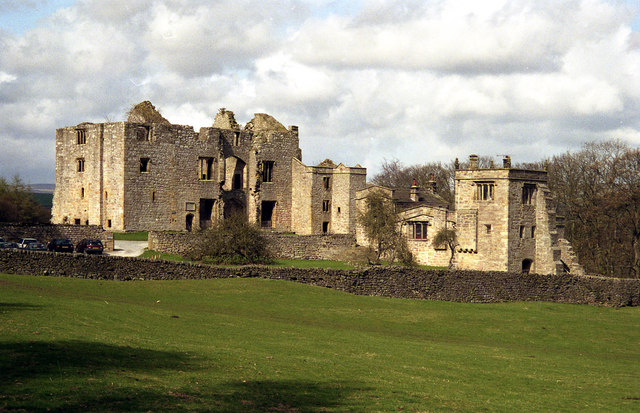
Barden Tower

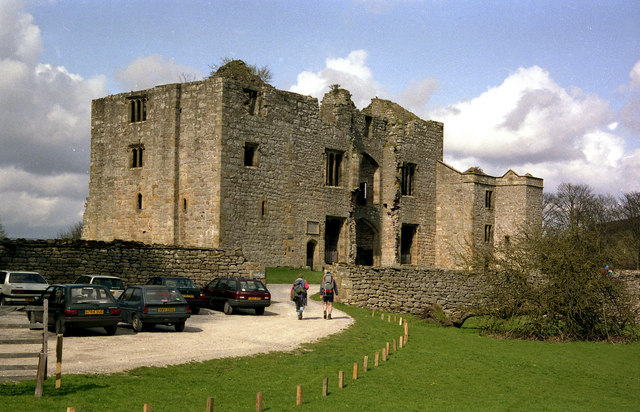
Barden Tower

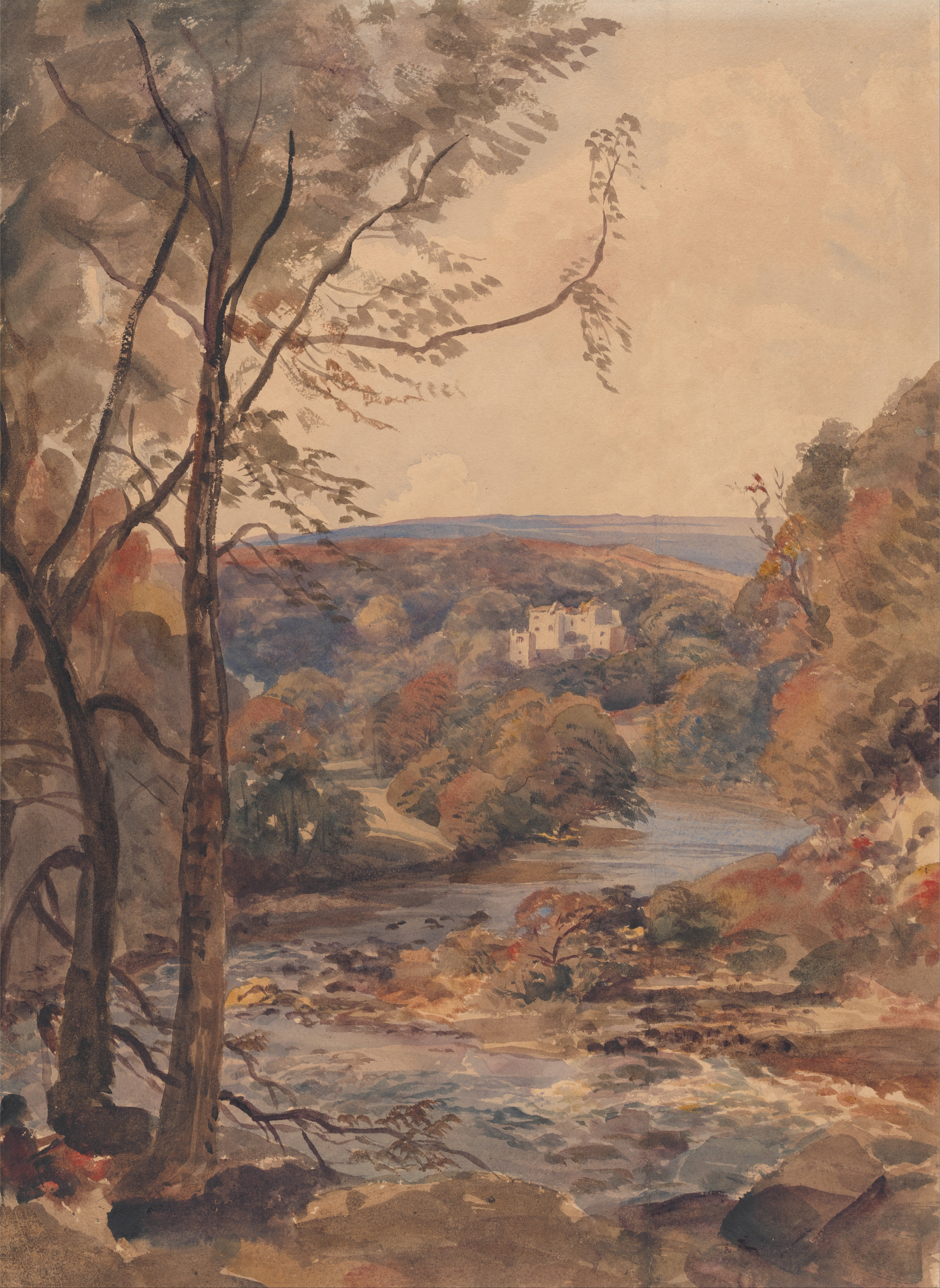
Peter DeWint - Barden Tower, Yorkshire
