= Barden, Craven =

Civil parish in North Yorkshire, England

Coordinates: 54°00′46″N 1°55′23″W

Barden
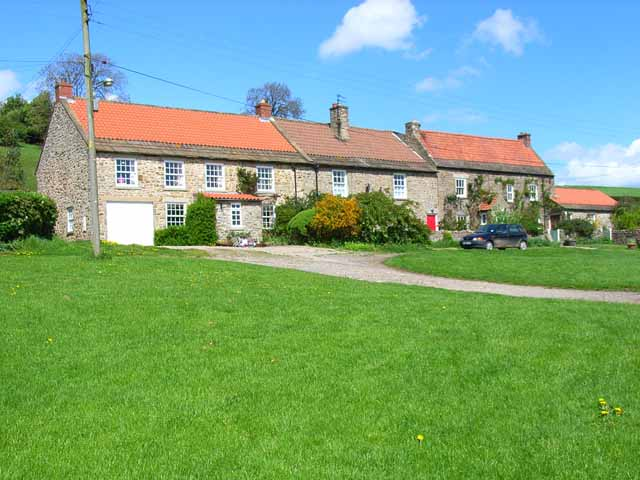
- Barden, Craven

- Location within North Yorkshire
- OS grid reference: SE050571
- Civil parish: Barden
- Unitary authority: North Yorkshire
- Ceremonial county: North Yorkshire
- Region: Yorkshire and the Humber
- Country: England
- Sovereign state: United Kingdom
- Post town: SKIPTON
- Postcode district: BD23
- Police: North Yorkshire
- Fire: North Yorkshire
- Ambulance: Yorkshire

Barden is a civil parish in the county of North Yorkshire, England. It consists of the hamlet of Drebley and a few scattered houses in Wharfedale in the Yorkshire Dales. The parish also includes two areas of moorland, Barden Fell to the east of the River Wharfe and Barden Moor to the west of the river. Both moorlands are access land, and are popular with walkers. Barden Fell rises to the prominent peak of Simon's Seat, and Barden Moor includes two scenic 19th century reservoirs. Much of the parish is on the Bolton Abbey estate.

The parish is sparsely populated. At the 2011 Census the population of the civil parish was less than 100, and the census statistics for the parish were therefore merged with those of the adjoining civil parish of Hazlewood with Storiths. In 2015, North Yorkshire County Council estimated that the population of the parish was 90.

Until 1974 it was part of the West Riding of Yorkshire. From 1974 to 2023 it was part of the Craven District, it is now administered by the unitary North Yorkshire Council.

Barden is derived from the Old English berdene, and means the valley where the barley is grown.

== Buildings and history ==
To the south, Barden Tower is a ruined late 15th-century tower house built by Sir Henry Clifford. This was made Henry Clifford, 10th Baron de Clifford's chief residence after the Clifford estates, confiscated by the Yorkists, were restored to him on the accession of Henry VII. Because Clifford led a troop of dalesmen to victory at the Battle of Flodden, halberds used at that battle were passed down to descendants and, as late as the middle of the 20th century, could still be found in some farmhouses in the area.

Earlier there was also a mill used for drying and grinding corn (Hough Mill) which was rebuilt by Lady Anne Clifford in 1657. This fell out of use after Skyreholme Dam burst in 1899, sweeping away the smaller dam which supplied the mill. Tom Lister, the last besom-maker of Wharfedale made his wares in the top story during the 1930s.

Near Barden Tower, Barden Bridge carries a single track local road across the River Wharfe, linking together the parts of the parish on both banks. At a further remove, the bridge also gives access to Appletreewick and Parcevall Hall from the B6160 road. The bridge was built in 1659 and is Grade II listed.

In the west side of the parish on Barden Moor are Upper and Lower Barden Reservoirs. These both feed water into Barden Beck, which flows into the River Wharfe. The Upper reservoir also is connected to the Nidd Aqueduct, which sends water from Nidderdale and Wharfedale to the Chellow Heights treatment plant in Bradford. Barden Moor itself covers an area of 25 square miles (65 km^{2}) and stretches from Embsay in the west and Bolton Abbey in the south, to Burnsall in the north and the River Wharfe in the east. The moor is used for shooting grouse between August and December each year, which can lead to paths across it being closed for public safety.

The Dales Way from Ilkley to the Lake District also passes through the parish on a north–south axis.

== See also ==
- Listed buildings in Barden, Craven
