= The Murder of Rutland by Lord Clifford =

Painting by Charles Robert Leslie

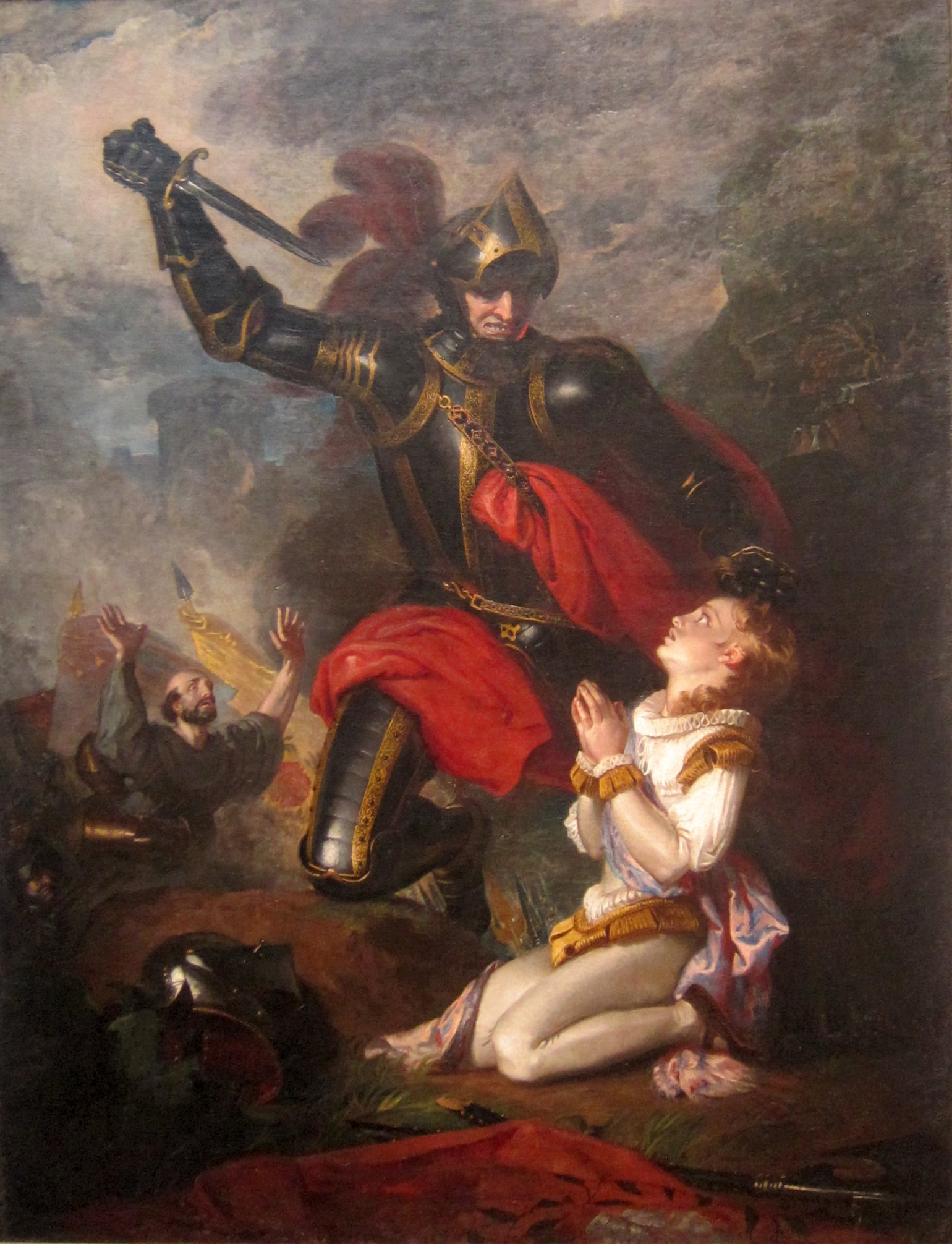
- Artist: Charles Robert Leslie
- Year: 1815
- Type: Oil on canvas, history painting
- Dimensions: 245.7 cm × 202 cm (96.7 in × 80 in)
- Location: Pennsylvania Academy of the Fine Arts, Philadelphia

The Murder of Rutland by Lord Clifford is an oil on canvas history painting by the British-American artist Charles Robert Leslie, from 1815. It is held at the Pennsylvania Academy of the Fine Arts, in Philadelphia.

It depicts a scene from the Wars of the Roses, inspired by William Shakespeare's play Henry VI, Part 3, in which the young Edmund, Earl of Rutland, is killed by the Lord Clifford in the aftermath of the 1460 Battle of Wakefield.

Leslie got his friend Edwin Landseer, then a student at the Royal Academy Schools, to model the role of Rutland, with Landseer later fondly remembering the experience Today the painting is in the collection of the Pennsylvania Academy of the Fine Arts, in Philadelphia.

== Bibliography ==
- Danly, Susan. Telling Tales: Nineteenth-century Narrative Painting from the Collection of the Pennsylvania Academy of the Fine Arts. American Federation of Arts, 1991.
- Evans, Dorinda. Benjamin West and His American Students. National Portrait Gallery, 1980.
- Ormond, Richard. Sir Edwin Landseer. Philadelphia Museum of Art, 1981
