= Henry Summerson =

British professor

Henry Summerson is an English historian. He is the author of a number of books.

Summerson, the son of an industrialist, was educated at Harrow and Pembroke College, Cambridge, where he was awarded a BA in History in 1970 and a PhD in 1976 for his thesis "The maintenance of law and order in England, 1227–1263". He worked for the Carlisle Archaeological Unit and wrote a history of medieval Carlisle (1993). He was then employed by English Heritage writing a number of guidebooks on English castles. He is an editor of the Oxford Dictionary of National Biography, for which he has written 165 articles. He was Research Edition for the Dictionary's medieval and Tudor articles, and is now an associate research editor. He has taken part in the Oxford Holinshed Project.

A participant in the Magna Carta Project, Summerson has written commentaries chapter by chapter of the original Magna Carta of 1215, and its sequel of 1225.

Summerson is a Fellow of the Royal Historical Society.

== Works ==
- The maintenance of law and order in England, 1227–63. Ph.D. dissertation 1975, University of Cambridge, supervisor D. J. V. Fisher
- Crown Pleas of the Devon Eyre of 1238 (1985), court records, editor
- Medieval Carlisle: The City and the Borders from the Late Eleventh to the Mid-Sixteenth Century (1993, 2 vols.)
- Crown Pleas of the Wiltshire Eyre, 1268 (2012), court records, editor with Brenda Farr and Christopher Robin Elrington
- Carlisle Castle (2013), with M. R. McCarthy, and R. G. Annis
