= Battle of Ferrybridge =

1461 battle in the English Wars of the Roses

- Part of Wars of the Roses
Date	28 March 1461
Location	Ferrybridge in Yorkshire, England 53°42′45″N 1°16′25″W
Result	Indecisive

Belligerents
House of Lancaster	House of York

Commanders and leaders
Baron Clifford †; Baron Neville †	Earl of Warwick; Baron Fauconberg; Baron FitzWalter (DOW)

Strength
Unknown	Unknown

Casualties and losses
- 3,000

The Battle of Ferrybridge, 28 March 1461, was a preliminary engagement between the houses of York and Lancaster before the larger battle of Towton, during the period now known as the Wars of the Roses.

== Background ==
After proclaiming himself king, Edward IV gathered together a large force and marched north towards the Lancastrian position behind the Aire River in Yorkshire. On 27 March the Earl of Warwick (leading the vanguard) forged a crossing at Ferrybridge, bridging the gaps (the Lancastrians having previously destroyed it) with planks. In the process he lost many men, both to the freezing winter water and to the frequent hail of arrows coming from a small but determined Lancastrian force on the other side. Once the crossing was managed and the Lancastrians seen off, Warwick had his men repair the bridge while camp was established on the north side of the river.

== Battle ==
Early next morning the Yorkists were ambushed by a large party of Lancastrians under Lord Clifford and John, Lord Neville, a younger brother of the 2nd Earl of Westmorland (Warwick's first cousins of the half blood). Completely surprised and confused, Warwick's forces suffered many losses. Warwick's second-in-command at camp, Lord FitzWalter was mortally wounded while trying to rally his men (he died a week later). The Bastard of Salisbury, Warwick's half-brother, was slain and in the process of retreating the Earl of Warwick himself was injured, struck by an arrow in the leg. Jean de Wavrin states that nearly 3,000 men perished in the fighting.

== Aftermath ==
After the battle Edward arrived with his main army and together Warwick and Edward returned to the bridge to find it in ruins. Warwick sent his uncle, Lord Fauconberg with the Yorkist cavalry upstream to where they crossed the ford at Castleford and pursued Lord Clifford. Fauconberg pursued Lord Clifford, his half grand nephew, in sight of the main Lancastrian army and defeated him after a fierce struggle. Clifford was killed by an arrow in the throat, having removed the piece of armour that should have protected this area of his body, most likely so he could more easily issue commands. (Note: He probably unhinged his bevor so he could breathe better, more quickly scan the battlefield and shout commands but he was killed moments later.)

== Date ==
Some doubt exists over what date the battle took place on due to the way the historical sources refer to the different times of the day. No contemporary source explicitly states that the battle took place on 28 March but refers to Palm Sunday eve which could refer to the morning before dawn on the 29th. Archaeology evidence indicates that the subsequent engagement near Dittingdale after crossing the river is too close to the location of the main battle at Towton to have been fought on a separate day. As the historical sources all agree that Lord Clifford was killed on the same day as the engagement at Ferrybridge, a new interpretation has been given of there being three consecutive engagements in one day – starting before dawn on 29 March and ending at Towton. If this is the case it has been suggested the quoted casualty figures given for the battle of Towton may include those killed at Ferrybridge.
