= Humphrey Neville of Brancepeth =

English knight and insurgent

Humphrey Neville
- Born: 1439; Slingsby Manor, Yorkshire
- Died: 29 September 1469 (aged 29–30); York, Yorkshire
- Family: House of Neville
- Father: Thomas Neville of Brancepeth
- Mother: Elizabeth Beaumont

Sir Humphrey Neville (c. 1439 – 29 September 1469) of Brancepeth was an English knight and insurgent during the Wars of the Roses. A scion of the noble House of Neville, he was a son of Thomas Neville of Brancepeth and a nephew of Ralph Neville, 2nd Earl of Westmorland, and belonged to a senior but disinherited branch of the family. Humphrey and his family supported the House of Lancaster during the Wars of the Roses, while his junior but richer Neville cousins, chiefly represented by the famous Earl of Warwick, supported the House of York. Humphrey almost single-handedly led the Lancastrian resistance during the early years of the reign of Edward IV, until he was executed in 1469, in the king's presence.

== Family ==
Humphrey is said to have been born in 1439 at Slingsby Manor, near Malton, in Yorkshire. He was the eldest son and heir of sir Thomas Neville of Brancepeth (d. c. 1459) by Elizabeth, daughter of Henry Beaumont, 5th Baron Beaumont, son of John Beaumont, 4th Baron Beaumont (d. 1413). He had a younger brother, Charles, and also an illegitimate one, George.

Thomas Neville and his brothers, the Earl of Westmorland and Lord Neville (Humphrey's uncles), were sons of John Neville (c. 1387–1420), the eldest son and heir of Ralph Neville, 1st Earl of Westmorland, a powerful magnate from northern England. The earl's remarriage to Joan Beaufort, a half sister of Henry IV, prompted him to disinherit John, his eldest son, in favour of his issue by Joan, the eldest of which was Richard Neville, 5th Earl of Salisbury. Upon Ralph Neville's death, most of the Neville family estates went to Joan Beaufort and her children.

The senior Neville branch disputed their disinheritance, resulting in the Neville–Neville feud with the Earl of Salisbury. The dispute became entangled in the Wars of the Roses, with Salisbury and his son Warwick supporting the Yorkists while the senior branch supported the Lancastrians. The 2nd Earl of Westmorland became incapacitated and so the family cause was taken by his brothers. Humphrey's father Thomas died early in the conflict, while his uncle, Lord Neville, was killed at the Battle of Towton in 1461.

== Life account ==
Humphrey shared the Lancastrian sentiments of the elder branch of the house of Neville, the offspring of Westmorland's first marriage, and he declared for Henry VI when, on 26 June 1461, he, with Lord Roos and others, made a descent into Durham as far as Brancepeth from Scotland, whither he had fled after Towton. Neville, who is described as 'esquire of Brancepeth', and filled the office of bailiff of Hexham, was captured and attainted in the parliament held in the following November. A Thomas Neville, clerk of Brancepeth, also attainted for the same offence, was no doubt a relative. Humphrey remained some time in the Tower, but ultimately managed to break out, and, returning to Northumberland, 'made commotion of people against our sovereign lord the king [Edward IV]'. But finally suing for pardon, the king, 'having respect to his birth,' took him into his grace by letters patent, and he was knighted. The family influence had doubtless been exerted in his favour.

Nevertheless, in April 1464, Sir Humphrey Neville was again in arms with the Lancastrians at Bamburgh Castle, and, with eighty spearmen and some archers, lay in ambush in a wood near Newcastle for his distant cousin, John Neville, Lord Montagu, who was on his way to the border to escort the Scottish peace commissioners to York. But Montagu, warned in time, escaped the snare. Sir Humphrey would seem to have fought at the Battle of Hexham, and, flying southwards, took refuge in a cave on the banks of the Derwent, which here for some distance forms the boundary between Northumberland and Durham. He and Sir Ralph Grey, the defender of Bamburgh Castle, were alone excepted from the amnesty proclaimed on 11 June, and one contemporary document, printed in the notes to Warkworth's 'Chronicle', almost implies that he, too, was in Bamburgh. But, as Bamburgh surrendered to the Earl of Warwick at the end of June, this is improbable.

Humphrey Neville is said to have remained in his cave, leading the life of a freebooter for five years, until, in the summer of 1469, Edward IV fell into the hands of the Earl of Warwick and was carried captive into the north. The Lancastrians had given their assistance to the movement against Edward, and were apparently dissatisfied with the use Warwick made of his victory. Sir Humphrey, whose attainder had been renewed in January 1465, once more came forward and raised the standard of revolt on the border. Warwick had to release the king before he could get forces to follow him against Neville, but then easily suppressed the rising. Humphrey and his brother Charles were captured, carried to York, and executed there on 29 September in the presence of Edward IV. The Latin extract quoted by Surtees without giving his authority, according to which Neville was captured in Holderness, may possibly contain a confusion of the Yorkshire with the Durham Derwent.

According to Surtees, Neville left a son, Arthur Neville (d. circ. 1502) of Scole Acle, who had two sons: Ralph Neville of Scole Acle and Coveshouses, in Weardale; and Lancelot Neville, who married Anne, daughter of Rowland Tempest of Holmeside. Ralph Neville's grandson, Ralph Neville, died in 1615, leaving only a daughter Anne, and with her this branch of the Nevilles, the Nevilles of Weardale, seems to have died out.
