= Arbour Hill, Hornby =

Building in Hornby, North Yorkshire, England

Coordinates: 54°19′42″N 1°39′32″W

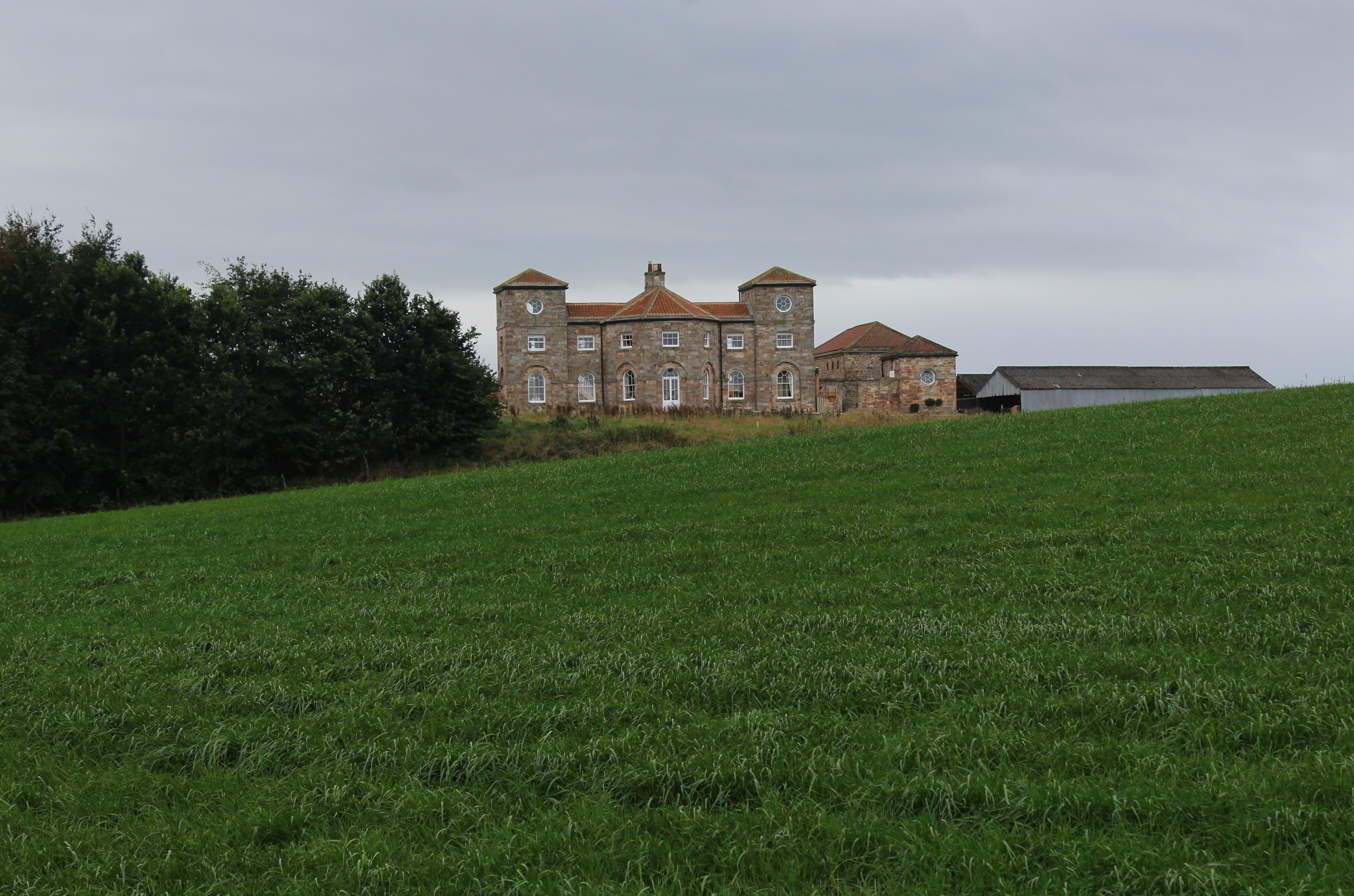
The house, in 2024

Arbour Hill is a historic building in the parish of Hornby, near Bedale in North Yorkshire, in England.

The building was commissioned as one of four model farms by Robert Darcy, 4th Earl of Holderness of Hornby Castle. It was designed by John Carr, its composition inspired by his earlier farm, Street House in Ainderby Miers, and was completed in about 1760. It was grade II listed in 1967. One of its barns was converted into accommodation in the 1980s, then in 2010 the house was restored along with its outbuildings. The dovecote and summerhouse flanking the house were converted into holiday accommodation.

The house is built of sandstone on a plinth, with an impost band, an eaves band, and pantile roofs. The house has two storeys and seven bays, the middle three bays projecting and canted, and the outer bays are three-storey pavilions with pyramidal roofs. The house is flanked by screen walls, each containing a doorway. To the left is a two-storey dovecote, and to the right is a two-storey summerhouse, both with a pyramidal roof. The windows in the house are sashes, and in each pavilion is an oculus. Inside the house is an 18th-century staircase.

== See also ==
- Listed buildings in Hornby, Richmondshire
