= Earl Ralph =

More than one Ralph held the title and rank of earl. They include:

- Ralph the Timid, Earl of Hereford (d. 1057)
- Ralph de Gael, Earl of East Anglia (d. c. 1096)
- Ralph Stafford, 1st Earl of Stafford (d. 1372)
- Ralph de Neville, 1st Earl of Westmorland (d. 1425)
- Ralph Neville, 2nd Earl of Westmorland (d. 1484)
- Ralph Neville, 3rd Earl of Westmorland (d. 1499)
- Ralph Neville, 4th Earl of Westmorland (d. 1549)
- Ralph Gore, 1st Earl of Ross (d. 1802)
- Ralph Howard, 7th Earl of Wicklow (d. 1946)

== See also ==
- Ralph Verney, 1st Earl Verney
- Ralph Verney, 2nd Earl Verney
