= Battle of Wakefield =

1460 Wars of the Roses battle

Coordinates: 53°40′48″N 1°29′32″W

- Part of the Wars of the Roses
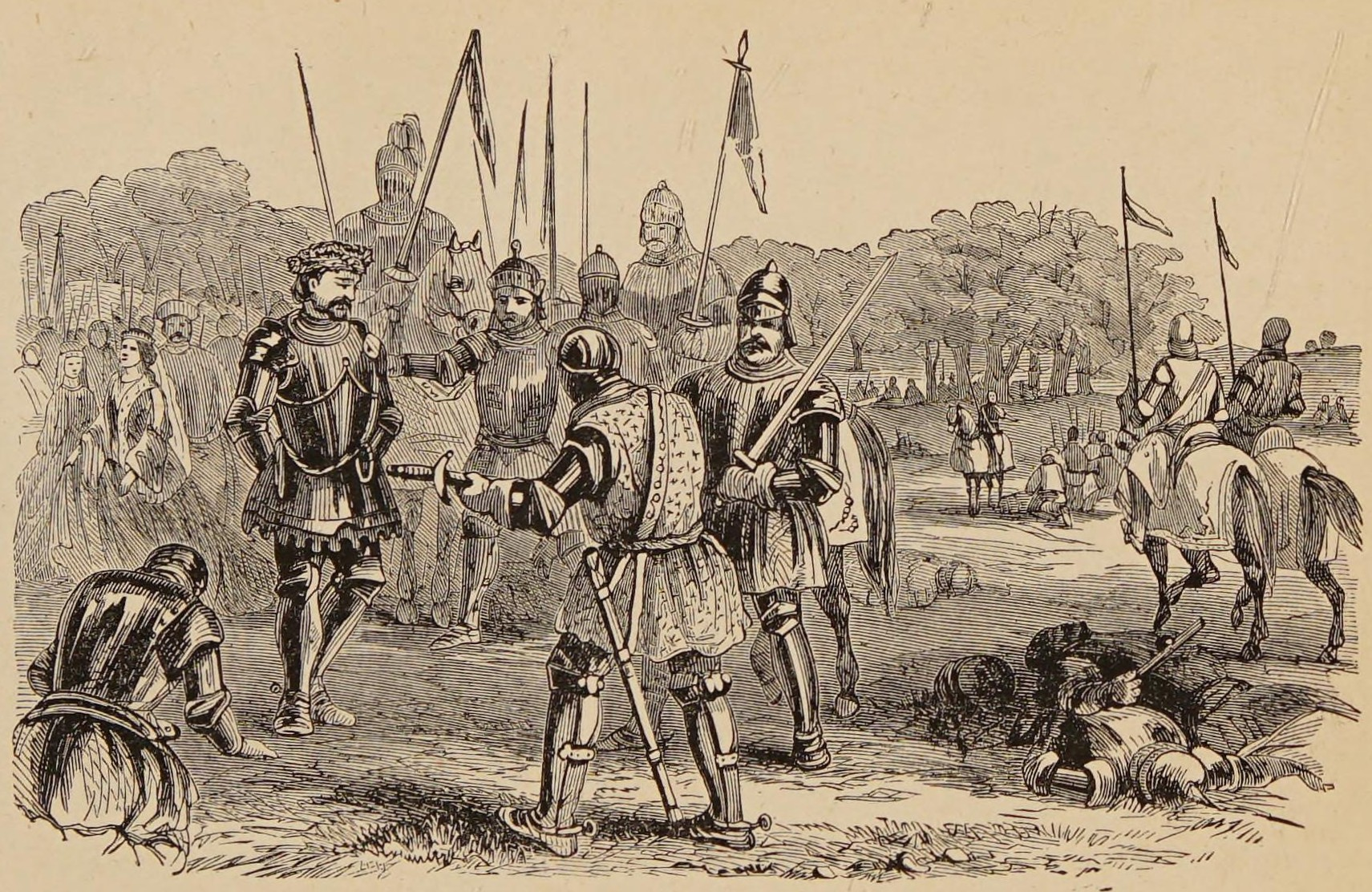
- Last hours of Richard Plantagenet, father of Richard III (illustration from 1904)
Date	29 December 1460
Location	Wakefield, Yorkshire, England
Result	Lancastrian victory

Belligerents
House of Lancaster; Supported by: Kingdom of Scotland	House of York

Commanders and leaders
Earl of Northumberland; Baron Clifford	Duke of York †; Earl of Rutland (executed); Earl of Salisbury (executed)

Strength
Unknown	c.60

Casualties and losses
Unknown	12-15 killed

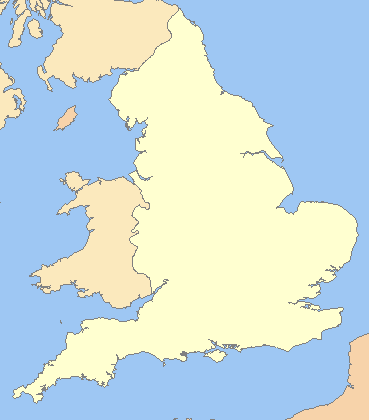
Locations:

– Battle of Wakefield; – other battles; – other places

The 'Battle' of Wakefield has traditionally been said to have taken place in Sandal Magna near Wakefield in northern England, on 30 December 1460. Recent research demonstrates that it was not a battle in the proper sense of a word, but a small-scale skirmish that resulted in the capture and subsequent deaths of Richard of York, 3rd Duke of York, his second son, Edmund, Earl of Rutland, and Richard Neville, 5th Earl of Salisbury.

For several years before the battle, the Duke of York – a descendant of two (both the second and fourth) of Edward III's surviving sons – had become increasingly opposed to the court of the mentally incapacitated Lancastrian King Henry VI (descended from Edward III's third surviving son) and his Queen, the formidable Margaret of Anjou. After open warfare broke out between the factions and Henry became his prisoner, he laid claim to the throne, but lacked sufficient support. Instead, in an agreement known as the Act of Accord, he was made Henry's heir to the throne, displacing from the succession Henry and Margaret's 7-year-old son Edward, Prince of Wales. Margaret of Anjou and several prominent nobles were irreconcilably opposed to this accord and massed their armies in the north. Richard of York marched north to deal with them.

As the King’s Lancastrian supporters held Pontefract Castle, York made for his manor at nearby Wakefield. Later Yorkist and Tudor accounts claimed he took residence in Sandal Castle, but the manorial accounts show that he stayed in the town itself, probably at the Moot Hall. The traditional accounts give several unlikely reasons for him leaving the supposed safety of Sandal Castle to engage a larger Lancastrian army, but the earliest accounts, documentary and chronicle, are in agreement that the Duke and his followers were ambushed, captured and murdered on 29 December, probably as they left Wakefield for York.

== Background ==
King Henry VI ascended the throne in 1422, when he was only nine months old. He grew up to be an ineffective king, and prone to spells of mental illness. There were increasingly bitter divisions among the officials and councillors who governed in Henry's name, mainly over the conduct of the Hundred Years' War with France. By the early 1450s, the most important rivalry was that between Richard, Duke of York, and Edmund Beaufort, Duke of Somerset. York argued for a more vigorous prosecution of the war, to recover territories recently lost to the French, while Somerset belonged to the party which tried to secure peace by making concessions. York had been Lieutenant in France for several years and resented being supplanted in that office by Somerset, who had then failed to defend Normandy against French armies.

York was not only the wealthiest magnate in the land, but was also descended through both his parents from King Edward III, leading to calls that he be recognised as successor to the childless King Henry. His rival, Somerset, belonged to the Beaufort family, who were originally illegitimate descendants of Edward III. The Beauforts had been made legitimate by a papal bull, but due to a proclamation of Richard II were supposedly barred from the line of succession to the throne. However, there was always the possibility that this could be circumvented, and the Beaufort line eventually produced King Henry VII and the Tudor dynasty via Somerset's niece, Margaret Beaufort.

York was appointed Lieutenant of Ireland, effectively exiling him from court, while Somerset increased his influence over the king. In 1452, York marched on London in an attempt to force Henry to dismiss Somerset from the government, but at this stage he lacked support and was forced to swear not to take arms against the king at Old St Paul's Cathedral. Then in 1453, Henry VI suffered a complete mental breakdown. The Great Council of peers appointed York Lord Protector and he governed the country responsibly, but Henry recovered his sanity after eighteen months and restored Somerset to favour. During Henry's madness his queen, Margaret of Anjou, had given birth to a son, which dashed York's hopes of becoming king if Henry died.

Fearing arrest for treason, York and his most prominent allies, the Nevilles (York's brother in law, the Earl of Salisbury, and Salisbury's son the Earl of Warwick, later known as the "Kingmaker"), finally resorted to armed force in 1455. At the First Battle of St Albans, many of York's and Salisbury's rivals and enemies were killed, including Somerset, the Earl of Northumberland (whose family, the Percys, had been involved in a long-running feud with the Nevilles) and Lord Clifford.

After the battle, York reaffirmed his loyalty to King Henry, who had been found abandoned in a shop in the town. He was reappointed Lord Protector and Lieutenant of Ireland. Margaret of Anjou nevertheless suspected York of wishing to supplant her infant son, Edward, as Henry's successor, and the heirs of the Lancastrian nobles who were killed at St Albans remained at deadly feud with York.

== Events of the year preceding Wakefield ==
After an uneasy peace during which attempts at reconciliation failed, hostilities broke out again in 1459. Richard of York once again feared indictment for rebellion by a Great Council dominated by his opponents. He and the Nevilles concentrated their forces near York's stronghold at Ludlow Castle in the Welsh Marches but at the confrontation with the much larger royal army which became known as the Battle of Ludford, some of Warwick's contingent from the garrison of Calais, led by experienced captain Andrew Trollope, defected overnight. York and the Nevilles promptly abandoned their troops and fled. The next day, the outnumbered and leaderless Yorkist army surrendered.

York went to Ireland, where he had unchallenged support, while Salisbury, Warwick and York's eldest son Edward, Earl of March, made their way to Calais, where Warwick was Constable. They narrowly forestalled the new Duke of Somerset who, with Trollope, had been sent to regain it. Lancastrian attempts to reassert their authority over Ireland and Calais failed, but York and his supporters were declared traitors and attainted. The victorious Lancastrians became reviled for the manner in which their army had looted the town of Ludlow after the Yorkist surrender at Ludford Bridge, and the repressive acts of a compliant Parliament of Devils which caused many uncommitted peers to fear for their own property and titles. The country remained in disorder.

In 1460, the Nevilles invaded England through a foothold they had already established at Sandwich and rapidly secured London and the South of England where Warwick had popular support. Warwick and March then advanced north to engage Henry's army in the Midlands. At the Battle of Northampton, part of the Lancastrian army defected and the rest were decisively defeated. Henry was captured on the battlefield for the second time. He was taken to London, and confined in the Bishop of London's palace. George Neville, Bishop of Exeter, was appointed Chancellor of England and Viscount Bourchier (another of York's brothers in law) was appointed Treasurer.

The Duke of York landed in Chester some weeks later and made his way to London with much pomp. Entering Parliament, he attempted to claim the throne, but was met with stunned silence. Even his close allies were not prepared to support such a drastic step. Instead, after the House of Lords had considered his claim, they passed the Act of Accord, by which Henry would remain king, but York would govern the country as Lord Protector. Henry's son was disinherited, and York or one of his heirs would become king on Henry's death. The powerless and frightened Henry was forced to assent.

=== Lancastrian moves ===
When the Battle of Northampton was fought, Queen Margaret and her seven-year-old son Edward had been at Eccleshall Castle near Stafford, from where they fled via Cheshire to Harlech Castle in North Wales. There they joined Lancastrian nobles (including Henry's half-brother Jasper Tudor and the Duke of Exeter) who were recruiting armies in Wales and the West Country. They later proceeded by ship to Scotland, where Margaret negotiated, unsuccessfully it seems, for troops and other aid for the Lancastrian cause from the queen and regent, Mary of Guelders.

At the same time, other Lancastrians were rallying in Northern England. Many of them, including the Earl of Northumberland and Lords Clifford and Ros, had estates and influence in the north. They were later joined by the Duke of Somerset (Note: Somerset had been besieging Calais, but was outwardly reconciled to Warwick on 8 August 1460 and allowed to return to England.) and the Earl of Devon, who brought their forces from the West Country.[10] Northumberland, Clifford and Somerset were the sons of York's and Salisbury's rivals who had been killed at St. Albans. The Lancastrian forces mustered near Kingston upon Hull, and were said (in Gregory's Chronicle, a near-contemporary account) to number 15,000. Legal cases brought against York's and Salisbury's murdered estimated the force at 20,000, but in reality the Lancastrians' numbers were far smaller, probably only a few hundred. The Lancastrians seem to have gathered at Pontefract and began pillaging York's and Salisbury's estates in the north of England.

=== York's response ===
Faced with these challenges to his authority as Protector, York despatched his eldest son Edward to the Welsh Marches to contain the Lancastrians in Wales and left the Earl of Warwick in charge in London. He himself left London for the north on 9 December, accompanied by his second son Edmund, Earl of Rutland, and the Earl of Salisbury. According to one later chronicler, he tried to bring a train of artillery under "one called Lovelace, a gentleman of Kent" but bad weather forced the artillery to return to London. York did have artillery with him when he was captured, so it seems likely that this story was another invention designed to construct a narrative that explained York's death by betrayal and treason. Lovelace later featured in pro-Yorkist chronicles as a servant of Richard Neville, Earl of Warwick who was captured at Wakefield and persuaded to betray his Yorkist masters for gold.

York's and Salisbury's army was said by some to number 8,000 to 9,000 men, but it was more likely to have numbered only a few hundred strong. York may have underestimated both the numbers of the Lancastrian army in the north and the degree of opposition he had provoked by his attempt to seize the throne. On an earlier expedition to the north during his first protectorship in 1454, he and the Nevilles had easily subdued a rebellion by the Percys and the Duke of Exeter. In 1460, not only had almost every other northern peer joined the Lancastrian army, but York's nominal supporters were also divided. The Nevilles were one of the wealthiest and most influential families in the North and in addition to controlling large estates, the Earl of Salisbury had held the office of Warden of the Eastern March for several years. However, in the Neville–Neville feud, the cadet branch of the family headed by Salisbury had largely disinherited and eclipsed the senior branch (sometimes referred to as the "northern Nevilles") under his great-nephew, the Earl of Westmoreland. Westmoreland had spent several years trying to recover his lands. He had since become too ill, perhaps with some mental disorder, to play any active part. His younger brother, John Neville of Raby, had much to gain by York's and Salisbury's destruction.

According to the pro-Yorkist Annales, York's scouts clashed with the Lancastrians on 16 December, at Worksop in Nottinghamshire. If this event happened it was, at best, a minor skirmish, but by the terms of an act passed in Parliament just prior to York's departure from London, it would have constituted an act of treason against the heir to the throne.

== The 'Battle' of Wakefield ==
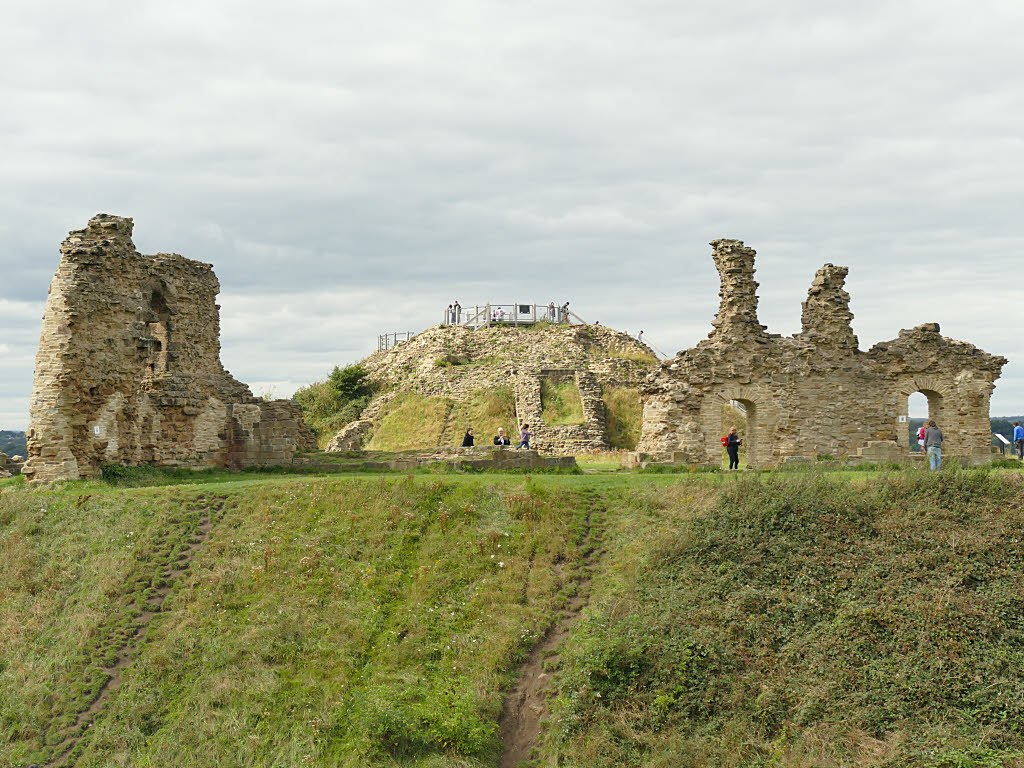
Sandal Castle

Tradition has it that York reached Sandal Castle on 21 December. However, manorial accounts show that he was still at nearby Conisbrough Castle at Christmas and only reached the town of Wakefield, accompanied by a small riding household, after 25 December. The same manorial accounts show that Sandal was simply not equipped to accommodate the ducal party, let alone an army, and it seems certain that the duke remained in Wakefield until he set out to ride north to York on 29 December.

What exactly happened next is unclear. According to Thomas Colt, one of the duke's closest servants and later administrator of his goods, York was ambushed on 29 December. He was robbed of goods, including his armour and other weapons. He seems to have been taken alive, unlike others in his party, suggesting that there was some combat. Richard Anson, the mayor of Kingston-upon-Hull and a long-standing supporter of York, was among those killed on 29 December (although a later chronicler would claim that Anson was taken to Pontefract and beheaded). Precisely where York was captured is unclear, but it seems certain it was not south of Wakefield or near Sandal Castle. It seems likely that he was captured near Stanley (from where bandages were bought either to treat the wounded or bind the hands of the captured) before being taken back to Wakefield and then onto Pontefract.

The earliest sources are unambiguous that York was captured and subsequently murdered, not killed in battle. The Act of Attainder against Edward IV's enemies in November 1461 accused the Duke of Somerset and others of murdering York. The London chronicler Robert Bale, writing in the early 1460s stated that 'the duke of york, the Erle Rutland his sone and the Erle Salesbury wer trayterously and ageinst lawe of armes be taking of Tretys graunted, mordered and slain.' The genealogical chronicle of the Yorkist kings known as the Chronicle of England from Rollo to Edward IV, written between 1461 and 1465, is clear on the nature of York's demise: Duke Richard was 'innocent goyng toward Yorke at Wakefelde [when his enemies] sette vpon hym oute of array [that is, without his armour and unprepared for battle] and kelled hym and his sonne the Erle of Routeland, the Erle of Salusbury and Lord Harrington with othir diuers gentills and comoners.'

=== The traditional account ===
By the late 1460s this initial narrative of what had transpired at Wakefield was changing into something quite different. Beginning with accounts written in the Burgundian Low Countries, probably inspired by newsletters circulated by the Earl of Warwick via Calais, York was increasingly portrayed as dying in battle and his ambush and capture transformed into a defeat in battle as a result of trickery or rashness in leaving the relative safety of Sandal Castle. The Burgundian chronicles introduced the notion that York was tricked by one of the Duke of Somerset's servants, Andrew Trollope, who became something of a bête noire of pro-Yorkist literature in the early 1470s. An English Chronicle stated that York was deceived by his distant kinsman, John, Lord Neville, although a letter in the Hull archives shows that Neville was still in his castle at Raby in County Durham on 28 December and not, as the Chronicle claimed, raising troops in Yorkshire.

The most influential accounts, however, were by the Tudor chroniclers, Polydore Vergil and Edward Hall. Both wrongly portrayed Margaret of Anjou as the leader of the Lancastrians although she was in Scotland at the end of December 1460. Hall's account proved irresistible to Victorian and many later historians. York, goaded by taunts from Queen Margaret, abandoned Sandal Castle and was overwhelmed by superior Lancastrian forces hidden in the woods and deer park that surrounded the castle. Research into the manorial records of Wakefield has demonstrated the impossibility of this account. In December 1460 the landscape traditionally identified as the battlefield would likely have been inundated, while a large fishpond occupied the middle of it.

=== Casualties ===
Later chroniclers gave wildly inflated numbers for those killed at Wakefield, involving up to 2,700 Yorkist dead for the loss of only 200 Lancastrians. In fact, only Richard Anson, Sir James Harrington and his son John, and possibly the London mercer John Harowe were named as being killed on 29 December. The 1461 Act of Attainder gave 30 December 1460 as the date of York's death and it seems he was taken to Pontefract and beheaded alongside his son, Rutland, and several others. Edward Hall's tale of Rutland's death at the hands of Lord Clifford on Wakefield Bridge, later immortalised by William Shakespeare, is almost certainly apocryphal.

The circumstances around Salisbury's death seem less controversial, although he may not have been involved in the incident that led to the death of York and Rutland. Most contemporary sources agree that he was taken to Pontefract and beheaded on 31 December. An English Chronicle recounts how his captors 'tooke hym owte of the castelle by violence and smote of his hed.' The pseudo-Worcestre Annales, however, stated that Salisbury was captured in the evening of the 29 December and murdered the next day by one of the illegitimate brothers of the Duke of Exeter. The short chronicle of events between 1431 and 1471 copied into the commonplace book of the Londoner John Vale stated that York, Rutland and Salisbury were captured at Wakefield 'and there beheded.' Significantly, he differentiated their deaths from those of 'the two lordis of Haringtonys the older and the yonge slayne in battell’ the same day. The bodies of York, Salisbury and Rutland were initially laid to rest in the Dominican Friary of St. Richard of Chichester in Pontefract.

== Aftermath ==
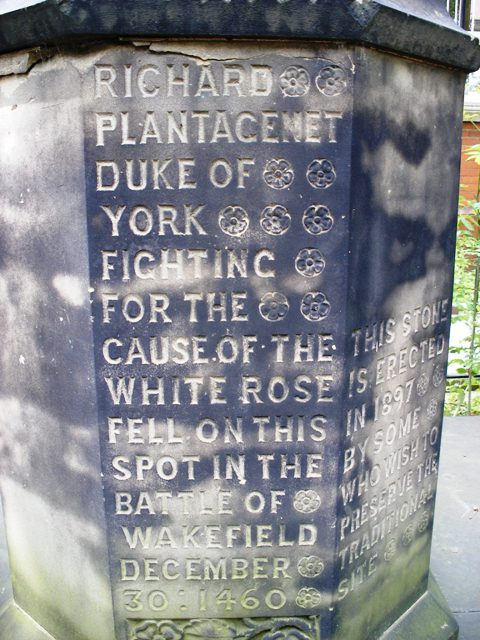
Monument to Richard of York

After the battle the heads of York, Rutland and Salisbury were displayed over Micklegate Bar, the south-western gate through the York city walls, the Duke wearing a crown made of either paper or reeds.

In 1476 King Edward IV ordered that the bodies of Richard, Duke of York and his younger son Edmund, Earl of Rutland, who had originally been buried at Pontefract following their deaths at Wakefield, be exhumed and translated with ceremony to St Mary and All Saints Church in Fotheringhay, the Yorkist family mausoleum. The reburial was marked by an elaborate procession and services attended by nobility, underlining the Yorkist dynasty's status and Edward's efforts to honour his father's memory.

The death of Richard of York did not end the wars, or the House of York's claim to the throne. The northern Lancastrian army which had been victorious at Wakefield was reinforced by Scots and borderers eager for plunder, and marched south. They defeated Warwick's army at the Second Battle of St Albans and recaptured the feeble-minded King Henry, who had been abandoned on the battlefield for the third time, but were refused entry to London and failed to occupy the city. Warwick and Edward of March reoccupied London, and within a few weeks, Edward of March was proclaimed King Edward IV.

At the first Battle of St Albans, York had been content with the death of his rivals for power. At Wakefield and in every battle in the Wars of the Roses thereafter, the victors would eliminate not only any opposing leaders but also their family members and supporters, making the struggle more bitter and revenge driven.

In 1897 the local historian Dr J W Walker erected a monument in Manygates Lane on the spot where the Duke of York is supposed to have perished. It has been suggested that this was near to the spot where an older monument once stood, one which was destroyed during the English Civil War, but there is no archaeological evidence of this. A cross in memory of York's son, Rutland, was erected at the Park Street end of Kirkgate in Wakefield. Archaeologist Rachel Askew suggested that the memorial cross to the Duke of York may be fictional as the late-16th- and early-17th-century antiquarian John Camden did not mention it in his description of the location.

== In literature and folklore ==
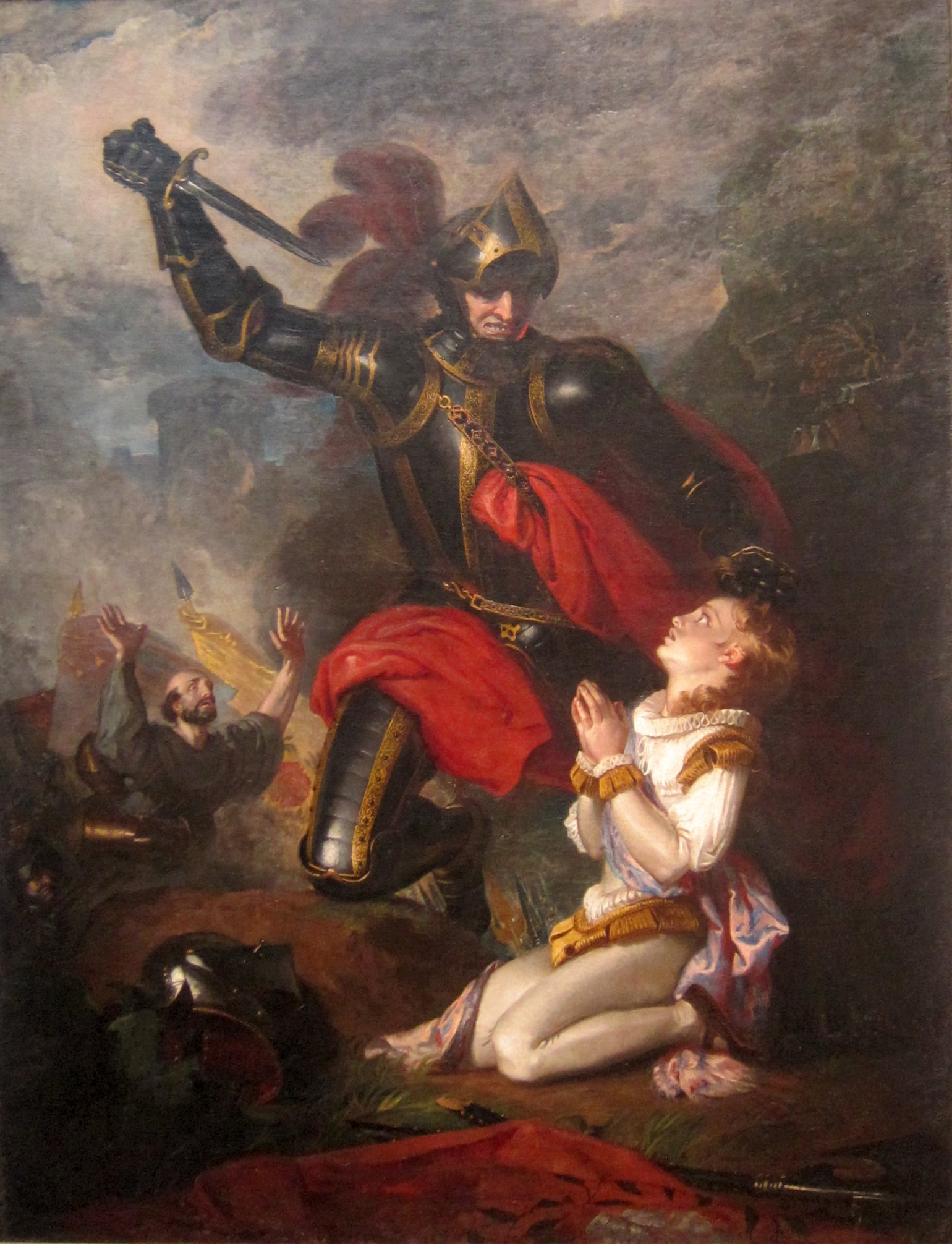
The Murder of Rutland by Lord Clifford by Charles Robert Leslie, 1815

Many people are familiar with William Shakespeare's melodramatic version of events in Henry VI, Part 3, notably the murder of Edmund of Rutland, although Edmund is depicted as a small child, and following his unnecessary slaughter by Clifford, Margaret torments his father, York, before murdering him also. In fact, Rutland, at seventeen, was more than old enough to be an active participant in the fighting. Margaret was almost certainly still in Scotland at the time.

The battle is said by some to be the source for the mnemonic for remembering the traditional colours of the rainbow, Richard Of York Gave Battle in Vain, and also the mocking nursery rhyme, "The Grand Old Duke of York", although this much more likely refers to the eighteenth-century Duke of York, son of George III.

"Dicky's Meadow", a well-known Northern expression, is commonly believed to refer to Sandals Meadow, where the battle of Wakefield took place and where Richard met his end. The common view held that Richard was ill-advised to fight here. The expression is usually used to warn against risky action, as in "If you do that you'll end up in Dicky's Meadow." However, the first known usage of that phrase did not appear until the 1860s, around 400 years after the battle took place.
