= Ralph Neville, 3rd Earl of Westmorland =

English peer (c. 1456–1499)

- Born: c. 1456; Raby Castle, Durham, England.
- Died: 6 February 1499; Hornby Castle, Yorkshire, England.
- Buried: St Mary's Church, Hornby
- Noble family: Neville
- Spouse: Isabel Booth
- Issue: Ralph Neville, Lord Neville; Lady Anne Neville
- Father: John Neville, Baron Neville
- Mother: Lady Anne Holland

Ralph Neville, 3rd Earl of Westmorland (c. 1456 – 6 February 1499) was an English peer. He was the grandfather of Ralph Neville, 4th Earl of Westmorland.

== Origins ==
He was born in about 1456, the only child of John Neville, Baron Neville (younger brother of Ralph Neville, 2nd Earl of Westmorland) by his wife Anne Holland, daughter of John Holland, 2nd Duke of Exeter (1395-1447).

== Career ==
Neville's father was slain fighting for the Lancastrians at the Battle of Towton on 29 March 1461, and attainted on 4 November of that year. On 6 October 1472 Ralph Neville obtained the reversal of his father's attainder and the restoration of the greater part of his estates, and thereby became Lord Neville (1459 creation).

On 18 April 1475 Neville was created a Knight of the Bath together with the sons of King Edward IV. He was a justice of the peace in Durham. For his 'good services against the rebels', on 23 March 1484 King Richard III granted Neville manors in Somerset and Berkshire and the reversion of lands which had formerly belonged to Margaret, Countess of Richmond. In September 1484 he was a commissioner to keep the truce with Scotland. On 3 November 1484 his uncle, Ralph Neville, 2nd Earl of Westmorland, died, and Neville succeeded as 3rd Earl of Westmorland and Lord Neville (1295 creation).

After the Yorkist defeat at Bosworth, Westmorland entered into bonds to the new king, Henry VII, of £400 and 400 marks, and on 5 December 1485, he gave custody (and the approval of the marriage of his eldest son and heir), Ralph Neville (d.1498), to the King.

Westmorland held a command in the army sent into Scotland in 1497 after James IV supported the pretensions to the crown of Perkin Warbeck.

== Marriage and issue ==
Before 20 February 1473, Neville married Isabel Booth, the daughter of Sir Roger Booth, esquire (1396–1467) and Catherine Hatton, and the niece of Lawrence Booth, Archbishop of York, by whom he had a son and a daughter:

- Ralph Neville, Lord Neville (d. 1498). As noted above, on 5 December 1485, his father had granted his custody (and the approval of the marriage of his eldest son) to the King. Accordingly, Lord Neville married firstly, in the presence of King Henry VII and his Queen, Elizabeth of York, Mary Paston (born 19 January 1470), the eldest daughter of Sir William Paston (b. 1436 – died before 7 September 1496) by Lady Anne Beaufort, daughter of Edmund Beaufort, 2nd Duke of Somerset. She died of measles at court, about Christmas 1489. There was no issue from the marriage.
  Lord Neville married secondly, again in the royal presence, Edith Sandys (d. 22 August 1529), sister of William Sandys, 1st Baron Sandys, by whom he had four children:
  - Ralph Neville, 4th Earl of Westmorland
  - a son who died young
  - Isabel Neville, who married firstly, Sir Robert Plumpton, and secondly, Lawrence Kighley.
  - Cecilia Neville, who married John Weston (d. after 1525), of Weeford, Staffordshire, and was the mother of Robert Weston, Lord Chancellor of Ireland

After Lord Neville's death in 1498, his widow, Edith, married Thomas Darcy, 1st Baron Darcy of Darcy, who was beheaded on Tower Hill on 30 June 1537.

- Lady Anne Neville, who married firstly, William Conyers, 1st Baron Conyers, and secondly, Anthony Saltmarsh (1473–1550) of Langton by Wragby, Lincolnshire.

== Death ==
Westmorland's eldest son died in 1498. Westmorland died at Hornby Castle, Yorkshire, the seat of his son-in-law, Sir William Conyers, on 6 February 1499, allegedly of grief for his son's death, and was buried in St Mary the Virgin, the parish church in the village of Hornby. His grandson, Ralph Neville, succeeded to the earldom as 4th Earl of Westmorland.

== Footnotes ==
Peerage of England
Preceded by Ralph Neville; 2nd Earl	Earl of Westmorland; 3 November 1484 – 6 February 1499	Succeeded by Ralph Neville; 4th Earl; 2nd Baron
Vacant Attainted Title last held by John Neville	Baron Neville; 6 October 1472 – 6 February 1499; 2nd creation	Succeeded by Ralph Neville; 4th Earl; 2nd Baron
