= John Neville (died 1420) =

English nobleman (1387–1420)

- Lord Neville
- Born: c. 1387
- Died: May 1420 (aged c. 33); Verneuil
- Family: House of Neville
- Spouse: Elizabeth Holland (m. c. 1394)
- Issue: Ralph Neville, 2nd Earl of Westmorland; Margaret Neville; John Neville, Baron Neville; Thomas Neville of Brancepeth
- Father: Ralph Neville, 1st Earl of Westmorland
- Mother: Margaret Stafford

Arms of Neville: Gules, a saltire argent

Sir John Neville (c. 1387 – May 1420) was the eldest son of Ralph Neville, 1st Earl of Westmorland (c. 1364 – 1425), a powerful nobleman in northern England, and Margaret Stafford (d. 1396), his first wife. As heir apparent to the earldom of Westmorland, he was styled 'Lord Neville'.

== Life ==
John was born in or before 1387. Little is known of his upbringing or youth, but he was clearly expected to inherit his father's powerful position in northern England. John acquired a castle at Kirkbymoorside, about 13 miles north of his father's caput of Sheriff Hutton. Ralph had been Warden of the West March since 1403, and John took his place in 1414. He played a significant part in helping his father achieve the return of the young Henry Percy from Scotland (where his father, the Earl of Northumberland, had exiled them both), so that Percy marry John's half-sister, Eleanor.

However, sometime before 1396, his father had married Joan Beaufort, a legitimated daughter of John of Gaunt, and soon after, and possibly as a direct consequence, the earl commenced a long string of enfeoffments in favour of the children he was now having with Joan, particularly the eldest son, Richard, later Earl of Salisbury. This effectively disinherited John who, curiously, seems to have "acquiesced" in the process as, on one occasion at least, he acted as a witness to one of the transfers. It is possible that Ralph did not intend to deprive John of as much as he eventually did: Ralph made a will in 1404, which, many years later, John's son (also Ralph) appears to have believed very much favoured his side of the family.

This will was superseded by a much later one, written after John had predeceased his father, which happened whilst he was in France, shortly before 20 May 1420 (probably at Verneuil). His demise led to a dispute between his sons and siblings for the distribution of the inheritance of the Earl of Westmorland. This created lasting divisions within the Neville family, resulting in the Neville–Neville feud, which later subsumed into the Wars of the Roses. It has been suggested that John Neville is one of the figures in the Neville Book of Hours of c. 1431.

== Marriage and issue ==
John Neville married Elizabeth Holland (c. 1388 – 1423), daughter of Thomas Holland, 2nd Earl of Kent, around 1394. They had three sons and one daughter:

1. Ralph Neville, 2nd Earl of Westmorland (4 April 1406 – 3 November 1484)
2. Margaret Neville (c. 1408 – between 5 May 1426 and 5 May 1434), who married Sir Thomas Lucy and left no issue
3. John Neville, Baron Neville (c. 1410 – 29 March 1461), second son, slain at the Battle of Towton. His son succeeded to the earldom of Westmorland.
4. Sir Thomas Neville of Brancepeth (d. 22 February c. 1459), third son, he married Elizabeth daughter of Henry Beaumont, 5th Baron Beaumont son of John Beaumont, 4th Baron Beaumont. father of Sir Humphrey Neville of Brancepeth
