= Ralph de Neville =

Ralph de Neville may refer to:

- Ralph Neville (died 1244), Lord Chancellor of England and Bishop of Chichester
- Ralph Neville, 1st Earl of Westmorland (c. 1364– 1425), English nobleman

== See also ==
- Ralph Neville (disambiguation)
