= List of historical figures dramatised by Shakespeare =

This list contains the biographies of historical figures who appear in the plays of William Shakespeare. (Note that it does not contain articles for characters; see instead Category:Shakespearean characters.) It should be possible to cross-reference historical characters to their dramatic counterpart at List of Shakespearean characters (A–K) and (L–Z).

In the following list, figures are listed by the name of the character, as it appears in Shakespeare's plays, and includes a narrative of the role of the character in the play: which may, or may not, reflect the role of the figure in history. The list contains duplicates: for example, Henry Percy, Earl of Northumberland will be found listed under N and P. To avoid unnecessary duplication of entries, various names will all redirect to one source, usually the most common name used in the actual texts, with links that direct to the proper initial.

== A ==
- Lord Abergavenny is Buckingham's son-in-law in Henry VIII.

For Aenobarbus (or AEnobarbus or Ænobarbus) see Enobarbus.

- Agrippa is a follower of Caesar in Antony and Cleopatra who proposes that the widowed Antony should marry Octavia.
- Alcibiades is a soldier who turns renegade when one of his junior officers is sentenced to death; he is a true friend to the title character in Timon of Athens.
- The Duke of Alençon is one of the French leaders in Henry VI, Part 1.

For Alexander Iden see Iden.

- Anne:
  - Anne Bullen is a maid of Honour to Katherine who later becomes King Henry's second wife in Henry VIII.
  - Lady Anne is the widow of Prince Edward, wooed by Richard over the corpse of her late father-in-law (Henry VI) in Richard III.
- Mark Antony (often just Antony, and sometimes Marcus Antonius) turns the mob against Caesar's killers and becomes a Triumvir in Julius Caesar. His romance with Cleopatra drives the action of Antony and Cleopatra.

For Sir Anthony Denny see Denny.

- Archbishop:
  - Archbishop of Canterbury:
    - The Archbishop of Canterbury is an important character in the first act of Henry V. He expounds Henry's claim to the French throne.
    - Thomas Cranmer, Archbishop of Canterbury is a major character in the last act of Henry VIII, hauled before the privy council by his enemies and threatened with imprisonment, but protected by the king.
    - See also Cardinal Bourchier, who was Archbishop of Canterbury at the time dramatised in Richard III.
  - Archbishop of York:
    - The Archbishop of York (1) is one of the rebel leaders in Henry IV, Part 1 and Henry IV, Part 2.
    - The Archbishop of York (2) assists Queen Elizabeth and the little Duke of York to obtain sanctuary in Richard III.
- Arthur is a child, the nephew of the king in King John. He persuades Hubert not to put out his eyes, but dies in an attempt to escape captivity.
- Aumerle is a companion and cousin of Richard in Richard II.

For Duke of Austria see Limoges.

- The Countess of Auvergne (Jacquette du Peschin) receives Talbot after his capture in Henry VI, Part 1.

== B ==
- Bagot is a favourite of Richard in Richard II.
- Lord Bardolph is a nobleman, one of the Percy faction, in Henry IV, Part 2.
- The Bastard of Orleans is one of the French leaders in Henry VI, Part 1.

For Beaufort see Bishop of Winchester.
For Bedford see Prince John of Lancaster, who was the Duke of Bedford.

- Lord Berkeley acts as messenger from York to Bolingbroke in Richard II.
- The Duke of Berry is a French leader in Henry V.
- Bishop:
  - The Bishop of Carlisle supports Richard in Richard II.
  - Bishop of Ely:
    - The Bishop of Ely (1) conspires with the Archbishop of Canterbury in the opening scene of Henry V.
    - The Bishop of Ely (2) ultimately shows his opposition to Richard in Richard III.
  - Bishop of Winchester:
    - The Bishop of Winchester (later "the Cardinal") is the uncle and chief enemy of Humphrey Duke of Gloucester in Henry VI, Part 1 and Henry VI, Part 2.
    - For The Bishop of Winchester in Henry VIII, see Gardiner.

For The Bishop of Lincoln see Bishop of Lincoln.

- Blanche is King John's niece, married (by arrangement among the kings, to seal an alliance) to the Dauphin.
- Blunt:
  - Sir James Blunt is a supporter of Richmond in Richard III.
  - Sir John Blunt is a supporter of the king in Henry IV, Part 2.
  - Sir Walter Blunt is a soldier and messenger to the king in Henry IV, Part 1. He is killed by Douglas while wearing the king's armour.
- Roger Bolingbroke is chaplain to the Duchess of Gloucester and orchestrates the demon-summoning in Henry VI, Part 2.
  - For Bolingbroke see also King Henry IV.
- Lady Bona is King Lewis's sister-in-law, whose hopes to marry Edward are thwarted in Henry VI, Part 3.
- The Duke of Bourbon fights on the French side in Henry V.

For Cardinal Bourchier see Cardinal.

- Boy in Richard III is the young son of the murdered Clarence (described in one speech as little Ned Plantagenet).
- Brackenbury is the Lieutenant of the Tower of London in Richard III.
- The Duke of Britain is a French leader in Henry V.
- Brutus:
  - Marcus Brutus (usually just Brutus) is a central character of Julius Caesar, who conspires against Caesar's life and stabs him.
  - See also Decius Brutus.
- Buckingham:
  - The Duke of Buckingham (1) is a Lancastrian in Henry VI, Part 2. His death is reported in Henry VI, Part 3.
  - The Duke of Buckingham (2) is a Yorkist in Henry VI, Part 3, and is a co-conspirator with Richard—although he is eventually rejected, then murdered on Richard's orders—in |Richard III.
  - The Duke of Buckingham (3), an enemy of Wolsey, falls from grace and is executed by Henry in Henry VIII.

For Anne Bullen see Anne.

- The Duke of Burgundy brokers the peace treaty between the kings of France and England in the last act of Henry V, and fights firstly in alliance with the English, and later in alliance with the French, in Henry VI, Part 1.
- Bushy is a favourite of Richard in Richard II.
- Doctor Butts is the king's physician in Henry VIII. He alerts the king to Cranmer's humiliation in refused admittance to the council chamber.

== C ==
- Caesar:
  - Julius Caesar is the title character of Julius Caesar, an Emperor of Rome who is stabbed in the Capitol, on the Ides of March.
  - Octavius Caesar is one of the Triumvirs, the three rulers of Rome after Caesar's death, in Julius Caesar and Antony and Cleopatra.
- Caius:
  - Doctor Caius is a French doctor in The Merry Wives of Windsor. He challenges Parson Hugh to a duel.
  - See also (Caius) Cassius, Caius Martius Coriolanus and Caius Ligarius.
- Calphurnia is the wife of Caesar, whose dream predicts her husband's death, in Julius Caesar.
- The Earl of Cambridge is one of the three conspirators against the king's life (with Scroop and Grey) in Henry V.

For Cardinal Campeius see Cardinal.

- Canidius is a follower of Antony in Antony and Cleopatra.

For Canterbury see Archbishop of Canterbury.

- Lord Caputius is an ambassador from the Holy Roman Emperor in Henry VIII.
- Cardinal:
  - Cardinal Bourchier delivers the little Duke of York from sanctuary, and into the hands of Richard and Buckingham, in Richard III.
  - Cardinal Campeius is the papal legate at the trial of Katherine in Henry VIII.
  - Cardinal Wolsey orchestrates the fall from grace of Buckingham and Katherine, but himself falls from grace and dies, in Henry VIII.
  - See also the Bishop of Winchester, who becomes a Cardinal in the course of Henry VI, Part 1.

For The Bishop of Carlisle see Bishop.

- Casca is one of the conspirators against Caesar in Julius Caesar. He has an important role in the early parts of the play, reporting offstage events.
- Caius Cassius, usually known just as Cassius, is a central character in Julius Caesar. He incites the conspiracy against Caesar, and recruits Brutus to the conspirators' ranks.
- Catesby is a double agent—seemingly loyal to Lord Hastings but actually reporting to Buckingham and Richard—in Richard III.

For Lord Chamberlain and Lord Chancellor see Lord Chamberlain and Lord Chancellor.

- King Charles VI of France is Henry's hated enemy in Henry V.

For King Charles VII of France see Dauphin.
For The Lord Chief Justice see Lord Chief Justice.

- Christopher Urswick is a minor character: a priest acting as messenger for Lord Stanley in Richard III.
- Cinna:
  - Cinna is one of the conspirators against Caesar in Julius Caesar.
  - Cinna is a poet, mistaken for the conspirator Cinna in Julius Caesar. Realising they have the wrong man, the mob "kill him for his bad verses".
- Clarence:
  - George, Duke of Clarence is the younger brother of Edward and the elder brother of Richard in Henry VI, part 3 and Richard III. He is often known as "perjured Clarence", having broken his oath to Warwick and fighting instead for his brother's faction. He is eventually drowned in a butt of malmsey wine.
  - Thomas, Duke of Clarence is Hal's younger brother, who appears in Henry IV, Part 2 and Henry V.
- Cleopatra is the lover of Antony in Antony and Cleopatra. She commits suicide using a poisonous asp.
- Clifford:
  - Clifford (sometimes called Young Clifford) is a staunch Lancastrian, and is the Yorkists' most hated enemies—as the killer of Rutland—in Henry VI, Part 2 and Henry VI, Part 3.
  - Old Clifford, father of Clifford, is a Lancastrian leader in Henry VI, Part 2.
- The Constable of France leads the French forces in Henry V.
- Constance is Arthur's mother in King John and a fierce advocate for her son's right to the English throne.
- Caius Martius Coriolanus, usually known just as Coriolanus, is the central character of Coriolanus, who earns the title "Coriolanus" in recognition of his skill at smiting Volscians in Coriolai.

For Thomas Cranmer see Archbishop of Canterbury.

- Thomas Cromwell is secretary to Wolsey, and later to the Privy Council, in Henry VIII.
- Cymbeline, the title character of Cymbeline, is king of the Britons, and father to Imogen, Guiderus and Arviragus.

== D ==
- Dauphin (sometimes Dolphin in older texts):
  - The Dauphin is Henry's chief enemy in Henry V.
  - The Dauphin, later King Charles VII of France leads the French forces, with Joan, in Henry VI, Part 1.
  - See also Lewis.
  - Decius Brutus is one of the conspirators against Caesar in Julius Caesar.
- Sir Anthony Denny is a minor character in Henry VIII, who brings Cranmer to the King.
- Lord Stanley, Earl of Derby is a military leader who ultimately reveals his loyalty to the Richmond faction, in spite of his son being a hostage to Richard, in Richard III.

For Doctor (title) see William Butts or John Caius.

- Dorset and Grey are the two sons of Queen Elizabeth (wife of Edward IV) from her first marriage, who are arrested and executed on the orders of Buckingham and Richard in Richard III.
- Donablain is the brother of Malcolm and a minor character in Macbeth.
- Duchess:
  - Duchess of Gloucester:
    - The Duchess of Gloucester (1) is the widow of Thomas of Woodstock, Duke of Gloucester. His murder (before the play opens) drives much of the action of Richard II.
    - The Duchess of Gloucester (2) is the wife of Humphrey, Duke of Gloucester in Henry VI, Part 2, in which she dabbles in witchcraft with disastrous results.
  - Duchess of York:
    - The Duchess of York (1) (unnamed) character in Richard II, a composite of Isabella of Castile, Duchess of York, died 1392, the mother of Aumerle, and Joan Holland, who bore no children
    - The Duchess of York (2) is the wife of Richard, Duke of York (1) in Henry VI, Part 3. She outlives him to mourn the death of two of their sons in Richard III.

For Duke see Duke of Austria (under Limoges), Duke of Bedford (under Prince John of Lancaster), Duke of Berry, Duke of Bourbon, Duke of Britain (or Brittany), Duke of Buckingham, Duke of Burgundy, Duke of Clarence, Duke of Exeter, Duke of Gloucester, Duke of Lancaster, Duke of Norfolk, Duke of Orleans, Duke of Somerset, Duke of Suffolk, Duke of Surrey or Duke of York.

- King Duncan is the former Scottish king, preceding Macbeth, before being killed in Macbeth by Macbeth.

== E ==
For Earl see Earl of Cambridge, Earl of Derby, Earl of Essex, Earl of Huntingdon, Earl of Northumberland, Earl of Oxford, Earl of Pembroke, Earl of Richmond (under King Henry VII), Earl Rivers, Earl of Salisbury, Earl of Surrey, Earl of Warwick, Earl of Westmoreland or Earl of Worcester.
For Edmund Mortimer see Mortimer.

- Edward:
  - Edward later King Edward IV is the eldest son of Richard, Duke of York (1) in Henry VI, Part 2 and Henry VI, Part 3, in the latter of which he becomes king. He dies in Richard III.
  - Edward the Confessor does not appear on stage nor does he have any dialogue, but he is mentioned and described as a king who possesses healing powers (the royal touch) in Macbeth.
  - Prince Edward:
    - Prince Edward is the son of Henry VI, who joins his mother Queen Margaret as a leader of the Lancastrian forces in Henry VI, Part 3. He is killed by the three Yorks (Edward, George and Richard).
    - Prince Edward of York later King Edward V is the eldest son of Edward IV and Queen Elizabeth. He appears in Henry VI, Part 3, and is the elder of the two princes in the tower in Richard III.
- Eleanor:
  - Queen Eleanor is the mother of the title character in King John. She takes a liking to Philip the Bastard, and recruits him to John's court.
  - See also Eleanor, Duchess of Gloucester.
- Queen Elizabeth is a suitor to, and then queen to, Edward IV in Henry VI, Part 3 and Richard III. She is a major character in the later play, and a foil to Richard.
- Ely:
  - The Bishop of Ely (1) conspires with the Archbishop of Canterbury in the opening scene of Henry V.
  - The Bishop of Ely (2) ultimately shows his opposition to Richard in Richard III.
- Enobarbus is a major character in Antony and Cleopatra, a follower of Antony who later abandons him to join Caesar.
- Sir Thomas Erpingham is the commander of the longbowmen at Agincourt in Henry V.
- The Earl of Essex is a minor character at John's court in King John.
- Exeter:
  - The Duke of Exeter (1) is an uncle of Henry V. He acts as emissary to the French King in Henry V. He has a more choric role in Henry VI, Part 1.
  - The Duke of Exeter (2) is a Lancastrian leader in Henry VI, Part 3.

== F ==
- Sir John Falstaff (based on both Sir John Oldcastle and Sir John Fastolfe) is a central character of Henry IV, Part 1, Henry IV, Part 2, and The Merry Wives of Windsor. In the Henry plays, he is "bad angel" to prince Hal, and is eventually rejected by him. He is the lecherous gull of the title characters in Merry Wives. His death is reported in Henry V, although he is not a character in that play.
- Sir John Fastolfe (John Fastolf) is a coward, stripped of his garter in Henry VI, Part 1.
- Lord Fitzwalter (Walter FitzWalter, 5th Baron FitzWalter) is among those who challenges Aumerle in Richard II.

For France see King Charles VI, King Charles VII, The Constable of France, King Lewis XI, King Philip II

== G ==
- Gallus is a follower of Caesar in Antony and Cleopatra.
- Gardiner is the King's secretary, and later Bishop of Winchester. He is Cranmer's chief enemy in Henry VIII.
- Sir Thomas Gargrave is killed along with the Earl of Salisbury during the Siege of Orléans in Henry VI, Part 1.
- Garter King of Arms officiates at Anne Bullen's coronation and the christening of Princess Elizabeth in Henry VIII.

For Gaunt see John of Gaunt, Duke of Lancaster.
For George see George, Duke of Clarence.

- Girl in Richard III is the young daughter of the murdered Clarence.
- Sir William Glansdale survives the cannon shot on the tower which kills the Earl of Salisbury during the Siege of Orléans in Henry VI, Part 1.
- Owen Glendower, a warrior and magician who tries the patience of Hotspur, leads the Welsh forces in the rebellion in Henry IV, Part 1.
- Gloucester:
  - Humphrey, Duke of Gloucester appears as a brother of Hal in Henry IV, Part 2 and Henry V. He is a much more important character as the protector in Henry VI, Part 1 and Henry VI, Part 2, in which he is murdered by his rivals.
  - For Richard, Duke of Gloucester see King Richard III.
  - See also Duchess of Gloucester.
- Matthew Gough is an enemy of Jack Cade's rebels in Henry VI, Part 2.
- Governor:
  - The Governor of Harfleur surrenders to the English king in Henry V.
  - The Governor of Paris has an oath of allegiance administered to him by Gloucester (but has no lines of his own) in Henry VI, Part 1.
- John Gower is the "Presenter", a narrator, of Pericles, Prince of Tyre.
- Green is a favourite of Richard in Richard II.
- Grey:
  - Grey and Dorset are the two sons of Queen Elizabeth from her first marriage, who are arrested and executed on the orders of Buckingham and Richard in Richard III.
  - Sir Thomas Grey is one of the three conspirators against the king's life (with Cambridge and Scroop) in Henry V.
  - For Lady Grey see Queen Elizabeth.
- Sir Henry Guildford welcomes guests to Cardinal Wolsey's party in Henry VIII.

== H ==
- Hal, later King Henry V (sometimes called The Prince of Wales, Prince Henry or just Harry) is a central character in Henry IV, Part 1 and Henry IV, Part 2 and is the title character of Henry V. He has a closer relationship with Falstaff than with his father (Henry IV), but he eventually ascends the throne, rejects Falstaff, and leads the English to victory at Agincourt.

For Harfleur see Governor of Harfleur.
For Harry see Hotspur, Bolingbroke or Henry.

- Lord Hastings is the prime minister, beheaded on Richard's orders in Richard III.
- Henry:
  - Bolingbroke, later King Henry IV leads a revolt against King Richard in Richard II. He is the title character of Henry IV, Part 1 and Henry IV, Part 2 which chart the rebellions against him by the Percy faction, and his difficult relationship with his eldest son, Hal.
  - King Henry VI, the title character of Henry VI, Part 1, Henry VI, Part 2, and Henry VI, Part 3, is a weak and ineffectual king, and the plays chart the rebellions against him, leading to his overthrow and murder.
  - The Earl of Richmond, later King Henry VII leads the rebellion against the cruel rule of King Richard III in the play of that name, and eventually succeeds him as king.
  - King Henry VIII is the central character of the play Henry VIII, portrayed as a wise and strong ruler.
  - Prince Henry appears towards the end of King John, as successor to the title character.
  - See also Sir Henry Guildford.
- Sir Walter Herbert is a follower of Richmond in Richard III.
- Hotspur or Harry Percy, brave and chivalrous but hot-headed and sometimes comical, is an important foil to Hal, and leader of the rebel forces, in Henry IV, Part 1.
- Hubert is a henchman in King John. He resolves to put out Arthur's eyes, on John's orders, but eventually relents.

For Sir Hugh Mortimer see Mortimer.
For Humphrey see Gloucester.

- The Earl of Huntingdon is a non-speaking follower of the king in Henry V.

== I ==
- Alexander Iden kills Jack Cade in Henry VI, Part 2.
- Queen Isabel of France appears in the last act of Henry V.

== J ==
- Jack Cade leads a proletarian rebellion in Henry VI, Part 2.
- Joan la Pucelle (Joan of Arc) leads the Dauphin's forces against Talbot and the English in Henry VI, Part 1.
- John:
  - John of Gaunt, Duke of Lancaster, uncle to King Richard and father to Bolingbroke, dies in Richard II, having delivered his famous "This sceptred isle..." speech.
  - King John is the title character of King John: a king whose throne is under threat from the claim of his young nephew, Arthur.
  - Prince John of Lancaster, the younger brother of Hal, would be a fairly minor character in Henry IV, Part 1, Henry IV, Part 2, and Henry V, were it not for his central, unscrupulous, role in the Gaultree Forest episode of Henry IV, Part 2. He is also the Duke of Bedford who is Regent of France in Henry VI, Part 1.
  - See also Sir John Blunt, Sir John Falstaff, Sir John Fastolfe, John Gower, Sir John Montgomery, Sir John Mortimer, Sir John Stanley, Sir John Talbot or John Talbot.
- Julius Caesar is the title character of Julius Caesar, an Emperor of Rome who is stabbed in the Capitol, on the Ides of March.

== K ==
For Kate see Lady Percy.

- Katharine/Katherine:
  - Katharine is the French princess who marries Henry in Henry V.
  - Queen Katherine of Aragon is the first wife of King Henry in Henry VIII. She falls from grace, is divorced and dies.

For King see King Charles of France, King Duncan, King Edward, King Henry, King John, King Lewis of France, King Philip of France or King Richard.

== L ==
- Lady:
  - Lady Macbeth is the wife of Macbeth. She helps him plot the murder of King Duncan in Macbeth.
  - Lady Mortimer, daughter of Glendower and wife of Edmund Mortimer, sings in Welsh in Henry IV, Part 1.
  - Lady Northumberland is the Earl of Northumberland's wife, who dissuades him from joining the rebels at Gaultree Forest in Henry IV, Part 2.
  - Lady Percy (sometimes called Kate) is Hotspur's wife in Henry IV, Part 1, and returns (as his widow) in Henry IV, Part 2.
  - See also Lady Anne and Lady Bona.

For Lancaster see John of Gaunt, Duke of Lancaster, Prince John of Lancaster or King Henry IV (aka Bolingbroke). Other members of the House of Lancaster include King Henry V, King Henry VI, Queen Margaret, Prince Edward and Lady Anne.

- Lepidus is one of the Triumvirs, the three rulers of Rome after Caesar's death, in Julius Caesar and Antony and Cleopatra.
- Lewis: (Note: "Lewis" in Shakespeare is equivalent to a historical "Louis".)
  - King Lewis XI of France, insulted by Edward IV's marriage to Lady Grey, allies himself with Warwick and Margaret in Henry VI, Part 3.
  - Lewis is the Dauphin in King John. He marries John's niece, Blanche, to cement an alliance with England. Later he leads forces against John.
- Caius Ligarius is one of the conspirators against Caesar in Julius Caesar.
- Limoges is the Duke of Austria in King John. He is intimidated—and eventually beheaded in battle—by the Bastard. The character is a composite of Aimar V of Limoges and Leopold V, Duke of Austria.
- The Bishop of Lincoln speaks in favour of Henry's divorce in the trial scene of Henry VIII.
- The Lord Mayor of London (historically Edmund Shaa, although not identified as such in the play) is fooled by Richard and Buckingham, and supports Richard's succession, in Richard III.
- The Lord Chamberlain in Henry VIII is a conflation of two historical Lords Chamberlain, one of them Lord Sandys, who is also a character in the play. (The other is the Earl of Worcester.)
- The Lord Chancellor (historically Sir Thomas More, although not identified as such in the play) is among the Privy Counsellors who accuse Cranmer in Henry VIII.
- The Lord Chief Justice is a dramatic foil to Falstaff in Henry IV, Part 2.
- Sir Thomas Lovell is a courtier of King Henry in Henry VIII.

For Louis see Lewis.

== M ==
- Macbeth is the title character of Macbeth who became king after defeating King Duncan; he is, however, portrayed as a usurper.
- Maecenas is a follower of Caesar in Antony and Cleopatra.

For Marcus see (Marcus) Brutus, (Marcus Aurelius) Lepidus, and Mark, which is often interchangeable with Marcus.

- Malcolm is a son of Duncan that appears in the play Macbeth.
- Queen Margaret is a fairly epic character, one of the greatest in that respect in Shakespeare. She appears as a naive girl in Henry VI, Part 1 and as an embittered old woman in Richard III. She is a central character of the two intervening plays, Henry VI, Part 2 and Henry VI, Part 3, in which she is the wife of Henry VI and a leader of his armies. In her most notable scene she supervises the murder/execution of Richard Duke of York.

For Mark Antony see Mark Antony.
For Marquess see Marquess of Dorset, Marquess of Montagu and Marquess of Suffolk (under Duke of Suffolk).

- Matthew Gough is an enemy of Jack Cade's rebels in Henry VI, Part 2.
- The Mayor of York, historically Thomas Beverley, reluctantly supports the Yorkists in Henry VI, Part 3.
- Menas, a follower of Pompey, suggests cutting loose the boat where the triumvirs are feasting in Antony and Cleopatra.
- Menecrates is a follower of Pompey in Antony and Cleopatra.
- Metellus Cimber is one of the conspirators in Julius Caesar.
- Sir John Montgomery (historically Thomas Montgomery) is a minor Yorkist character in Henry VI, Part 3.
- Mortimer:
  - Edmund Mortimer is a claimant to the English throne, and a leader of the rebel forces, in Henry IV, Part 1 and explains the Yorkist claim to the crown to Richard Plantagenet, Duke of York, in Henry VI, Part 1. He is a composite of two figures, a child claimant and his adult uncle, both named Edmund Mortimer.
  - Lady Mortimer, daughter of Glendower and wife of Edmund Mortimer, sings in Welsh in Henry IV, Part 1.
  - Sir Hugh Mortimer is an uncle of Richard Duke of York in Henry VI, Part 3.
  - Sir John Mortimer is an uncle of Richard Duke of York in Henry VI, Part 3.
  - See also Jack Cade, who falsely claims to be one John Mortimer, a claimant to the throne.
- Mowbray:
  - Lord Mowbray is a rebel leader in Henry IV, Part 2.
  - Thomas Mowbray, Duke of Norfolk is Bolingbroke's enemy, exiled by Richard, in Richard II.

== N ==
- Sir Nicholas Vaux is a minor character in the scene leading to Buckingham's execution in Henry VIII.
- Norfolk:
  - The Duke of Norfolk (1): see Thomas Mowbray
  - The Duke of Norfolk (2) is a supporter of the Yorkists in Henry VI, Part 3.
  - The Duke of Norfolk (3) is a supporter of Richard in Richard III.
  - The Duke of Norfolk (4) is an associate of Buckingham in Henry VIII. He is associated with both the second and third dukes.
  - See also Mowbray.
- Northumberland:
  - Henry Percy, Earl of Northumberland is Bolingbroke's chief ally in Richard II; in Henry IV, Part 1 and Henry IV, Part 2 he leads the rebellion against his former ally, who is now king.
  - The Earl of Northumberland fights for the Lancastrians in Henry VI, Part 3.
  - See also Lady Northumberland.

== O ==
- Octavia, sister of Octavius, marries Mark Antony when he is widowed in Antony and Cleopatra. Their marriage causes great distress to Antony's lover, Cleopatra.
- Octavius Caesar is one of the Triumvirs, the three rulers of Rome after Caesar's death, in Julius Caesar and Antony and Cleopatra.

For Old Clifford see Clifford.

- The Duke of Orleans fights on the French side in Henry V.

For Owen Glendower see Glendower.

- The Earl of Oxford is a staunch Lancastrian, supporting Henry in Henry VI, Part 3, and Richmond in Richard III.

== P ==
- Pembroke:
  - The Earl of Pembroke, together with Salisbury and Bigot, fear for the life of young Arthur, and later discover his body, in King John.
  - The Earl of Pembroke is a non-speaking Yorkist in Henry VI, Part 3.

For Percy see Northumberland, Lady Percy, Worcester or Lady Northumberland.

- King Philip of France allies himself with Constance in support of Arthur's claim, but later makes peace with King John.
- The Duke of Suffolk (William de la Pole) is a manipulative character, lover of Queen Margaret, in Henry VI, Part 1 and Henry VI, Part 2.
- Pompey or Sextus Pompeius is the enemy of the Triumvirate in Antony and Cleopatra.
- Portia is the wife of Brutus in Julius Caesar.

For Prince see Edward, Henry and John of Lancaster.

- Proculeius is a follower of Caesar in Antony and Cleopatra.

== Q ==
For Queen see Queen Eleanor, Queen Elizabeth, Queen Isabel(la), Queen Katherine or Queen Margaret.

- The Queen in Richard II is unnamed and seems to be a conglomerate of Isabella of Valois, Richard's child bride, and his previous (deceased but adult) wife Anne of Bohemia.

== R ==
- Sir Richard Ratcliffe is a confidant of Richard in Richard III.
- René or Regnier is the impoverished king of Naples and Jerusalem, and father to Queen Margaret, in Henry VI, Part 1.
- Richard:
  - King Richard II is the title character of Richard II: a king who is deposed and eventually murdered.
  - Richard, Duke of Gloucester, later King Richard III, brave but evil, is the third son of Richard, Duke of York (1). He is a fairly minor character in Henry VI, Part 2, is more prominent in Henry VI, Part 3, and is the title character—and murderer of many other characters—in Richard III.
  - Richard Plantagenet, later Richard Duke of York, is a central character in Henry VI, Part 1, Henry VI, Part 2 and Henry VI, Part 3. He is the Yorkist claimant to the throne of England, in opposition to Henry VI, and he is eventually killed on the orders of Queen Margaret.
  - See also Richard Duke of York.
  - Sir Richard Vernon is a follower of the rebel forces in Henry IV, Part 1.
- The Earl of Richmond, later King Henry VII, leads the rebellion against the cruel rule of Richard III, and eventually succeeds him as king.
- Earl Rivers is the brother to Queen Elizabeth in Henry VI, Part 3 and Richard III. He is arrested and executed on the orders of Richard and Buckingham.
- Lord Ross is a supporter of Bolingbroke in Richard II.
- Rutland is the youngest son of Richard Duke of York (1), killed in battle while still a boy, by Clifford, in Henry VI, part 3. (Historically, Rutland was not the youngest of the four York brothers depicted in the plays. Shakespeare made him so using dramatic licence.)

== S ==
- Salisbury:
  - The Earl of Salisbury (1) delivers bad news to Constance in King John.
  - The Earl of Salisbury (2) remains loyal to King Richard in Richard II.
  - The Earl of Salisbury (3) fights for the king in Henry V. He is killed by the Master Gunner's Boy in Henry VI, Part 1.
  - The Earl of Salisbury (4) supports the Yorkists in Henry VI, Part 2.
- Lord Sandys is a courtier in Henry VIII.
- Lord Saye is an enemy of Jack Cade, killed by the rebels, in Henry VI, Part 2.
- Lord Scales is an enemy of Jack Cade's rebels in Henry VI, Part 2.
- Scroop:
  - Lord Scroop is one of the three conspirators against the king's life (with Cambridge and Grey) in Henry V.
  - Sir Stephen Scroop supports Richard in Richard II.
  - See also Archbishop of York.
- Seleucus is Cleopatra's treasurer in Antony and Cleopatra.

For Sextus Pompey see Pompey.

- Seyward or Siward:
  - Seyward is the Earl of Northumberland in Macbeth.
  - Young Seyward is the son of the Earl of Northumberland in Macbeth.
- Sinel (note: probably because of a misinterpretation between the similarities of early modern "s" and "f" typography, this name starts with an "s" instead of an "f") is the father of Macbeth from whom he inherits the title Thane of Cawdor in Macbeth.
- Somerset:
  - The Duke of Somerset (1) is a follower of King Henry in Henry VI, Part 1.
  - The Duke of Somerset (2) appears among the Lancastrian faction in Henry VI, Part 2. His head is carried onstage by Richard (later Richard III) in the opening scene of Henry VI, Part 3.
  - The Duke of Somerset (3) is a conflation by Shakespeare of two historical Dukes of Somerset (Henry Beaufort, 3rd Duke of Somerset and Edmund Beaufort, 4th Duke of Somerset). He supports both factions at different stages of Henry VI, Part 3.
- Southwell, with Hume, Jourdain and Bolingbroke, are the supernatural conspirators with Eleanor Duchess of Gloucester in Henry VI, Part 2.
- Stafford:
  - Lord Stafford is a non-speaking Yorkist in Henry VI, Part 3.
  - Sir Humphrey Stafford is an enemy of Jack Cade in Henry VI, Part 2.
  - Stafford's Brother is an enemy of Jack Cade in Henry VI, Part 2.
- Stanley:
  - Lord Stanley, Earl of Derby is a military leader who ultimately reveals his loyalty to the Richmond faction, in spite of his son being a hostage to Richard, in Richard III.
  - Sir John Stanley supervises Eleanor's penance in Henry VI, Part 2.
  - Sir William Stanley, the historical brother of Lord Stanley from Richard III, is a minor character of the Yorkist faction in Henry VI, Part 3.
- Suffolk:
  - William de la Pole, Marquis of Suffolk, later Duke of Suffolk, is a manipulative character, loved by Queen Margaret, in Henry VI, Part 1 and Henry VI, Part 2.
  - The Duke of Suffolk is a courtier, cynical about the King's relationship with Anne Bullen in Henry VIII.
- Surrey:
  - The Duke of Surrey accuses Aumerle of plotting Woodstock's death in Richard II.
  - The Earl of Surrey is a supporter of the king in Henry IV, Part 2.
  - The Earl of Surrey is a son-in-law of Buckingham in Henry VIII.
- A Surveyor to the Duke of Buckingham gives evidence of his (alleged) treachery, in Henry VIII.
- Sweno, the son of Cnut the Great, appears in Act one, Macbeth.

== T ==
- Talbot:
  - Sir John Talbot is the leader of the English forces in France, and therefore the chief enemy of Joan, in Henry VI, Part 1.
  - John Talbot is the son of Sir John Talbot. They die together bravely in battle in Henry VI, Part 1.
- Taurus is a follower of Caesar in Antony and Cleopatra.
- Thidias is a follower of Caesar in Antony and Cleopatra, sent with messages to Cleopatra and to Antony.
- Thomas More was Chancellor under Henry VIII (though historically had been allowed to resign before the birth of Elizabeth depicted in Henry VIII).
- Timon is the central character of Timon of Athens. His over-generosity leads him into poverty, and his friends abandon him.
- Trebonius is one of the conspirators against Julius Caesar.
- Sir James Tyrrell is employed to murder the Princes in the Tower in Richard III.

== V ==
- Sir Thomas Vaughan is executed, alongside Rivers and Grey, in Richard III.
- Vaux:
  - Sir Nicholas Vaux is a minor character in the scene leading to Buckingham's execution in Henry VIII.
  - Vaux is a minor character of the Lancastrian party in Henry VI, Part 2.
- Ventidius is a follower of Antony in Antony and Cleopatra.
- Sir Richard Vernon is a follower of the rebel forces in Henry IV, Part 1.
- Virgilia is the title character's wife in Coriolanus.
- Volumnia is the title character's mother in Coriolanus. She persuades her son not to attack Rome, leading to his destruction.

== W ==
- Earl of Warwick:
  - The Earl of Warwick (1) is a supporter of King Henry in Henry IV, Part 2.
  - The Earl of Warwick (2) is an important player in the Wars of the Roses, firstly for the Yorkist party, and then for the Lancastrians. He appears in Henry VI, Part 1, Henry VI, Part 2, and Henry VI, Part 3.
- Earl of Westmoreland:
  - The Earl of Westmoreland (1) is one of the leaders of the royal forces in Henry IV, Part 1, Henry IV, Part 2, and Henry V.
  - The Earl of Westmoreland (2) fights for King Henry in Henry VI, Part 3.
- Willoughby is a supporter of Bolingbroke in Richard II.

For Winchester see Bishop of Winchester.

- Cardinal Wolsey orchestrates the fall from grace of Buckingham and Katherine, but himself falls from grace and dies, in Henry VIII.
- Woodville:
  - Woodville is Lieutenant of the Tower of London in Henry VI, Part 1.
  - See also Queen Elizabeth, Rivers, Dorset and Grey, all of whom are of the Woodville clan.
- The Earl of Worcester is the brother of the Earl of Northumberland, and a leader of the rebel forces, in Henry IV, Part 1.
- Thomas Wriothesley appears as Garter King of Arms in Henry VIII.

== Y ==
- York:
  - The Duke of York (1) is the uncle of both Richard and Bolingbroke, and the father of Aumerle, in Richard II.
  - The Duke of York (2) is a minor character, the leader of the "vaward" in Henry V. (Historically this character is one and the same person as Aumerle.)
  - Richard, Duke of York is the younger of the two Princes in the Tower, murdered on the orders of Richard in Richard III.
    - See also Richard Duke of York.
  - For Duchess of York see Duchess of York.
  - For Archbishop of York see Archbishop of York.
  - For Mayor of York see Mayor of York.
  - See also King Edward V, Edmund Mortimer, Aumerle, Queen Elizabeth and Lady Anne, all of whom are "of the House of York" directly or through marriage.

== See also ==
- List of Shakespearean characters (A–K)
- List of Shakespearean characters (L–Z)
- Shakespearean history
