= Thomas Neville =

Thomas Neville or variant spellings may refer to:

- Thomas Nevill, 5th Baron Furnivall (died 1407), English nobleman
- Thomas Neville (died 1460) (c. 1429 – 1460), Yorkist captain during the early years of the Wars of the Roses
- Thomas Neville (died 1471) (1429–1471), rebel during the Wars of the Roses
- Thomas Nevill (c. 1484 – 1542), English Speaker of the House of Commons in 1515
- Thomas Nevile (died 1615), English clergyman and academic
- Thomas Nevill (priest) (1901–1980), English Anglican priest and school teacher
- Tom Neville (hurler) (1939–2018), Irish retired hurler
- Tom Neville (offensive tackle) (born 1943), American football offensive tackle
- Tom Neville (guard) (1961–1998), former guard in the National Football League
- Tom Neville (politician) (born 1975), Irish politician
- Tom Neville (musician), British musician featured on With the Music I Die
- Thomas Neville of Brancepeth (born before 1439), father of Humphrey Neville of Brancepeth

== Fictional ==
- Tom Neville, a character in Revolution
