= Ralph Neville (disambiguation) =

Ralph Neville (died 1244) was Lord Chancellor of England and Bishop of Chichester.

Ralph Neville may also refer to:

- Ralph Neville, 1st Baron Neville de Raby (1262–1331), English aristocrat
- Ralph Neville, 2nd Baron Neville (c. 1291–1367), English peer and soldier
- Ralph Neville, 1st Earl of Westmorland (c. 1364–1425), English peer and Earl Marshal
- Ralph Neville, 2nd Earl of Westmorland (1408–1484), English peer
- Ralph Neville, 3rd Earl of Westmorland (1456–1499), English peer
- Ralph Neville, 4th Earl of Westmorland (1497–1549), English peer and soldier
- Ralph Neville-Grenville (1817–1886), British MP for Windsor, Somerset East and Somerset Mid
- Ralph Neville (judge) (1848–1918), British MP for Liverpool Exchange, 1887–1895
