= Listed buildings in Hornby, Richmondshire =

Hornby is a civil parish in the county of North Yorkshire, England. It contains 23 listed buildings that are recorded in the National Heritage List for England. Of these, two are listed at Grade I, the highest of the three grades, and the others are at Grade II, the lowest grade. The parish contains the village of Hornby and the surrounding area. The most important buildings in the parish are St Mary's Church and the fortified manor house of Hornby Castle. Both of these are listed, together with items in the churchyard, and structures associated with the house in the gardens or grounds. The other listed buildings include farmhouses, farm buildings, a bridge and a well-head.

== Key ==
Grade	Criteria
I	Buildings of exceptional interest, sometimes considered to be internationally important
II	Buildings of national importance and special interest

== Buildings ==
Name and location	Photograph	Date	Notes	Grade
St Mary's Church; 54.33891°N 1.65943°W		c. 1080	The church has been altered and extended through the centuries, including work done by J. Loughborough Pearson in 1877. The church is built in stone with lead roofs, and consists of a nave with a clerestory, north and south aisles, a south porch, a chancel with a north vestry and organ chamber and a south chapel, and a west tower, The tower has four stages, the bottom stage being the oldest part of the church. The lower two stages contain round-arched windows, in the third stage is a clock face, and the top stage contains two-light bell openings each divided by a baluster with a cushion capital. At the top is an embattled parapet on corbels, and corner pinnacles.	I
Weathered effigy 54.33883°N 1.65960°W	—	Medieval	The effigy is in the churchyard of St Mary's Church, to the west of the church. It is in sandstone, and consists of a carved figure lying on the ground, about 1.5 metres (4 ft 11 in) long. It is in a weathered condition, and appears to have crossed legs.	II
Cross shaft 54.33875°N 1.65951°W		Late medieval	The cross shaft is in the churchyard of St Mary's Church, to the south of the porch. It is in gritstone, about 1 metre (3 ft 3 in) high, and chamfered on a chamfered base. On the top is a smaller section and a later sundial.	II
Hornby Castle; 54.33844°N 1.65421°W		Late 15th century	A fortified manor house in sandstone, with a string course, embattled parapets, and roofs of lead and stone slate. The south range has two storeys and nine bays, with a turret over the left bay, the middle three bays are canted, and there is a recessed three-storey two-bay tower to the right. The windows are sashes with hood moulds, and in the middle bay is a coat of arms. The right two bays contain a gateway with a four-centred arch. In the tower are sash windows, windows with chamfered surrounds, and gargoyle-like grotesques. To the right of the tower is an embattled screen wall with a semicircular bay.	I
Old Park House; 54.32399°N 1.66843°W	—	Early 17th century	The farmhouse is in stone, with quoins, and a tile roof with coped raised verges and shaped kneelers. There are two storeys, four bays, a rear outshut, and single-storey ranges to the left and the right. The doorway has a chamfered quoined surround and a hood mould, and most of the windows are mullioned with some mullions missing. In the right gable end of the main range is a pigeoncote.	II
Hole chest tomb 54.33894°N 1.65912°W1	—	c. 1746	The chest tomb is in the churchyard of St Mary's Church, to the east of the chancel, and is in sandstone. It has a moulded lid with an inscription, on the sides are panels of pointed quatrefoils, and at the ends are pilasters.	II
Ha-ha, gate and gate piers north of Arbour Hill House; 54.32843°N 1.65884°W	—	Mid 18th century	The ha-ha is in stone with saddleback coping, it is about 1 metre (3 ft 3 in) high, and has a circular plan. In the centre is an opening flanked by square stone gate piers with pyramidal caps. The gate is in wrought iron and has plain round bars.	II
Home Farmhouse, wall, pavilion and outbuildings 54.33551°N 1.66693°W	—	Mid 18th century	The buildings are in sandstone. The house has a plinth, quoins, a cornice and a hipped artificial slate roof. There are two storeys and three bays. In the ground floor is an arcade of round arches with pilasters and an band. The central arch contains a doorway with a quoined surround, a fanlight and a lintel with a keystone. This is flanked by sash windows with lintels and keystones, and the upper floor contains sash windows with segmental heads. To the left is a screen wall and a pavilion with two storeys and one bay, and a tile roof. To the right are two outbuildings, one with a stone slate roof, and the other with a tile roof.	II
Granary northwest of Home Farmhouse; 54.33564°N 1.66710°W	—	Mid 18th century	The granary is in stone on a plinth, with sandstone dressings, quoins, a floor band, and a hipped Welsh slate roof. There are two storeys and four bays. The ground floor openings include doorways with lintels and keystones, and windows, and in the upper floor are a pitching door and circular windows.	II
Arbour Hill House, walls, dovecote and summerhouse 54.32824°N 1.65888°W		c. 1760	A farmhouse, later a private house, in sandstone on a plinth, with an impost band, an eaves band, and pantile roofs. The house has two storeys and seven bays, the middle three bays projecting and canted, and the outer bays are three-storey pavilions with pyramidal roofs. The house is flanked by screen walls, each containing a doorway. To the left is a two-storey dovecote, and to the right is a two-storey summerhouse, both with a pyramidal roof. The windows in the house are sashes, and in each pavilion is an oculus.	II
Barn southwest of Arbour Hill House; 54.32813°N 1.65922°W	—	c. 1760	The barn is in sandstone, with quoins, a floor band, an eaves band, and a pantile roof with stone slates at the eaves. There are two storeys and five bays. The openings, some of which are blocked, include doorways, windows, a doorway with a depressed segmental arch, and pitching holes.	II
Former barn southeast of Arbour Hill House; 54.32804°N 1.65867°W	—	c. 1760	The barn, later converted into a house, is in sandstone on a plinth, with quoins, a floor band, an eaves band, and a hipped pantile roof with stone slates at the eaves. There are two storeys and three bays. On the front are two recessed porches, a stable door, and sash windows with wedge lintels.	II
Swale chest tomb 54.33888°N 1.65908°W	—	c. 1768	The chest tomb is in the churchyard of St Mary's Church, to the east of the church. It is in sandstone, and has a moulded lid with an inscription. On the sides are arcaded panels, between which are traceried pilasters, and there are traceried end pilasters.	II
Group of four chest tombs 54.33879°N 1.65962°W	—	Late 18th century	The chest tombs are in the churchyard of St Mary's Church, to the south of the tower. They are in sandstone and have moulded lids with inscriptions. The three southern ones have plain sides on moulded bases, and the northern one has pilasters and ogee panels.	II
Bowling Green Bridge; 54.33675°N 1.65757°W	—	Before 1777	The bridge, which crosses a stream between two lakes in the grounds of Hornby Castle, was designed by John Carr. It is in stone, and consists of five round arches with voussoirs. The bridge has a band and a small parapet.	II
Forster chest tomb 54.33890°N 1.65917°W	—	c. 1798	The chest tomb is in the churchyard of St Mary's Church, to the south of the chancel, and is in sandstone. The longer sides each contains a carved central sunflower in a circle, flanked by fluted panels, and end pilasters. The shorter sides also have fluted panels and pilasters, and on the moulded lid is an inscription.	II
Garden walls 54.33959°N 1.66022°W	—	Late 18th to early 19th century (probable)	The walls of the former kitchen garden of Hornby Castle are in orange-red brick and stone with stone slab coping. They have a rectangular plan, consisting of an inner garden within a larger irregularly-shaped walled area. The inner wall contains a blocked round-arched doorway and a bothy. The outer walls have quoins and stepped pilaster buttresses. In the southeast corner is a doorway with a chamfered surround and a four-centred arched head, and in the northeast corner is a segmental-arched carriageway.	II
Hornby Lodge; 54.33933°N 1.65881°W		Late 18th to early 19th century	The estate lodge is in sandstone on a plinth, with string courses and an embattled parapet. There are two storeys and one bay. The doorway has a chamfered surround and a four-centred arched head, the windows are mullioned, and all the openings have hood moulds.	II
Gate piers near Hornby Lodge; 54.33933°N 1.65871°W		Late 18th to early 19th century	The gate piers flanking the entrance to the drive of Hornby Castle are in sandstone. Each has a square plan, a chamfered base, a hollow-chamfered capital and a ball finial.	II
Gate piers near Lawn Lodge; 54.33975°N 1.65319°W	—	Late 18th to early 19th century	The four gate piers flanking the pedestrian and carriage entrances of the drive to Hornby Castle are in sandstone. Each has a square plan, a chamfered base, a hollow-chamfered capital and a ball finial.	II
Museum; 54.33707°N 1.65896°W		Early 19th century	A Gothic folly, originally used as a museum, in the grounds of Hornby Castle, it is in sandstone lined with brick, and is in ruins. There is one storey and a basement, and three bays. On the east front is a canted bay containing a doorway with a pointed arch, in the basement are quatrefoil windows within pointed arches, and above are triangular crenellations and corner pinnacles. In the basement of the west front is a doorway with a four-centred arch. Above it are windows with quoined surrounds and pointed arches, a string course and an overhanging parapet.	II
Sarcophagus; 54.33907°N 1.65927°W	—	Early 19th century	The sarcophagus is in the churchyard of St Mary's Church, to the northeast of the church. It is in sandstone, and has a rectangular plan, tapering towards the bottom. On the sides are fielded panels, on the east side is an inscription, and the ends have fluted pilasters.	II
Well head 54.3392°N 1.66083°W		Early 19th century	The well head is in stone, and consists of a basin set into the ground. It is surrounded by four fluted columns carrying three circular slabs, the upper two stepped out over the lower ones.	II
