= Church of St Mary the Virgin, Hornby =

Grade I listed church in North Yorkshire, England

St Mary's Church, Hornby
- Church of St Mary the Virgin, Hornby
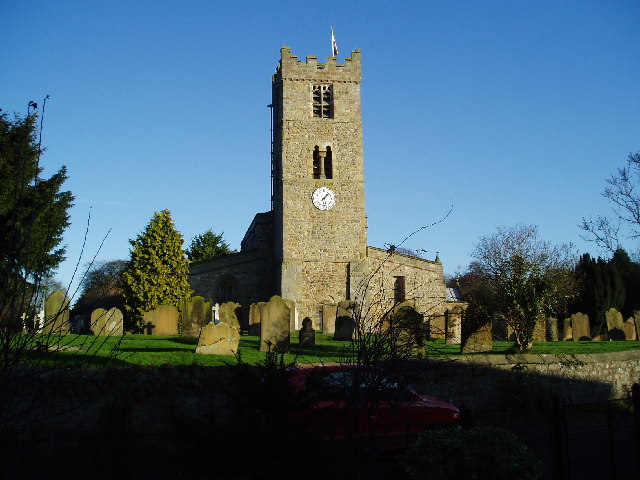
- St Mary's, Hornby

- Church of St Mary the Virgin, Hornby
- 54.3388°N 1.6592°W
- OS grid reference: SE 22243 93758
- Location: Hornby, North Yorkshire
- Country: England
- Denomination: Church of England
- Website: Official website

History
- Status: Active

Architecture
- Style: Norman; Perpendicular; Decorated

Administration
- Diocese: Leeds
- Archdeaconry: Richmond and Craven
- Deanery: Wensley
- Benefice: Lower Wensleydale
- Parish: Hornby (460226)

Clergy
- Vicar: Chris Lawton

Listed Building – Grade I
- Designated: 13 February 1967
- Reference no.: 1318321

St Mary's Church Hornby, is the parish church for the village of Hornby, Richmondshire in North Yorkshire, England. The church is one of six in the Benefice of Lower Wensleydale. The oldest parts of the building date back to the 11th century. It is 6 miles (9.7 km) south east of Richmond and 5 miles (8 km) north of Bedale.

== History ==
In medieval times, the approach to the village of Hornby from Richmond, was from the west. This afforded a good view of the church's tower set against the castle on the slight hill beyond. The village of Hornby is clustered around the church and the castle is set higher with a commanding view of the former Hornby Castle Park.

The church, its earnings and one carucate of land, were bestowed upon St Mary's Abbey in York, in the early part of the 12th century by Stephen, Earl of Richmond (along with other lands and the churches at Burneston and Middleton Tyas). Soon afterwards, Archbishop Walter Grey gave it to the common fund of the church of York. Because of the distance from York, it became a peculier (like Middleham or Masham) only without a court of its own to decide on matters.

The oldest part of the church is the tower, which dates back to 1080. Its architecture is mostly Norman, though the very top of the tower is Perpendicular in nature, so was added between the 14th and 16th centuries. Most of the main structure of the building was added in the Norman period, though the chantry dates from the 1330s and a contract from 1410 exists for the building of the south arcade. The church was reconstructed by John Conyers in 1413 and has also had work done in the 15th and 16th centuries. It refurbished a second time in 1877 at the behest of Fanny Georgiana, who was the Duchess of Leeds and resided at the adjacent Hornby Castle.

Whilst the church was the property of various mother churches in York, the surrounding land was owned by the Duchy of Leeds. In the 1840s, the Duchess of Leeds, Louisa Catherine Hervey-Bathurst, created a Catholic church in one of the houses in the village.

The clerestory is furnished with Perpendicular square headed windows, whilst the north aisle has Decorated windows. There are some effigies in the chancel and the aisles which date back to the 14th century, though the font, which dates to the 1780s and was a gift of a lady of Holderness, (Note: The font used to be inscribed with the following; "A gift of Mary, Countess of Holdernesse, [sic] 1783) was described as being modern in 1869. The parish of Hornby and Holderness in East Riding of Yorkshire have a history; several of the families established in the village after the Conquest came from Holderness (the Daltons, the De La Mare's and the St Quintin's). This led to the chapel in the church being labelled The Holderness Chapel on account of the effigies and memorials contained within. The church was grade I listed in 1969.

The graveyard contains five Commonwealth War Graves Commission type burial plots. Four of the graves are from the victims of the Catterick Bridge Explosion of 1944.

== Parish details ==
The church is in the Benefice of Lower Wenseydale and is one of six in that benefice, the other five are St Andrew's Finghall, St Gregory's Crakehall, St Michael Spennithorne, St Oswald's Hauxwell and St Patrick's in Patrick Brompton. The Parish of Hornby (parish code 460226) includes the villages of Hornby and Hackforth, along with the hamlet of Arrathorne. Historically, it also used to cover the villages of Ainderby Miers and High Holtby and was described as being an extensive parish.

Attendance at the church was an average of 20 people per week in 2017. This was down from 25 per week on average in 2008.

== Clergy ==
Vicars incumbent at St Mary's are recorded as far back as 1274. Listings are taken from H.B. McCall's Richmondshire Churches and church records. During the tenure of Reverend Jonathan Alderson, the curate in charge was the Reverend Mark James Pattison, who was the father of Sister Dora. Somes sources indicate that the incumbents without dates in the 14th and 15th centuries (Robert de Killum, John Orre and Thomas Shyerwynd), were not actually the priests in charge, as Speight maintains that between 1349 and 1896, there were 31 vicars with an average of 17.5 years each between them.

Year	Incumbent	Year	Incumbent	Year	Incumbent
1274	Richard de Mileford	1558	George Lumley	1829	George Alderson†
1349	Ralph Harpur♦†	1560	Ninian Hunt	1880	Henry Dawson Moore
1353	Robert de Hamerton‡		John Johnson‡	1894	Henry Travis Boultbee‡
	Robert de Killum (Note: Some sources state Robert de Billum)	1581	William Sewell	1903	William Frederick Drury
1359	William Coushanks	1626	Laurence Newton	1914	George Sulivan Cogcome
1399	John de Laysyngby	1650	Thomas Brockhall	1924	Samuel Bywater Porritt
	John Orre†	1670	Nicholas Pinder	1931	John Foster Beamish
1440	John Shirewynd	1677	Henry Lightfoot‡	1938	Reginald Moss Blundell
1475	James Hogeson	1684	Cuthbert Allen‡	1946	Benjamin William Crawford
	Thomas Shyerwynd‡	1715	James Hayton	1975	William Frederick Greetham
1482	Peter Cou	1770	John Piggott‡	1982	Raymond Joseph Pearson
1503	Simon Welden	1774	John Eyre	1995	David James Christie
1508	Richard Fisher	1783	James Norris†	2012	Bryan Stanley Dixon (Note: Held in plurality with the parishes of Finghall, Crakehall and Patrick Brompton.)
1516	Richard Atkinson	1783	Thomas Kirkby†	2017	Robin David Christopher Lawton
1548	William Fildeshende†	1800	William Alderson†		
1549	Peter Glenton‡	1804	Jonathan Alderson		

- †Died in office
- ‡Resigned office, usually on taking up another post elsewhere
- ♦Interregnum between incumbent and previous when dates are incorrect, period appears too long or records are incomplete.

== See also ==
- Grade I listed buildings in North Yorkshire (district)
- Listed buildings in Hornby, Richmondshire
