= John Neville, Baron Neville =

English noble (c. 1410–1461)

John Neville Baron Neville
- Born: c. 1410
- Died: 29 March 1461 (aged ~50); Dintingdale, near Saxton, Yorkshire
- Cause of death: Slain in battle
- Spouse: Anne Holland (married c. 1452)
- Children: Ralph Neville, 3rd Earl of Westmorland
- Parents: Sir John Neville (father); Elizabeth Holland (mother)
- Relatives: Ralph Neville, 2nd Earl of Westmorland (brother); Richard, Earl of Salisbury (uncle); Richard, Duke of York (uncle)
- Family: Neville

John Neville, Baron Neville (c. 1410 – 29 March 1461) was an English nobleman who fought for the House of Lancaster during the Wars of the Roses. He belonged to a senior but impoverished branch of the Neville family of northern England, which had earlier been disinherited in favour of a younger branch headed by John's half-uncle, Richard, Earl of Salisbury. John Neville and his brothers spent several years feuding with Salisbury over the contested inheritance and, when the dynastic wars broke out, John sided with the Lancastrians whilst the junior Nevilles sided with the House of York.

John was a beneficiary of the spoils of war after the Yorkists fled England in 1459, being awarded many of his rival Neville cousins' confiscated lands and offices, and was also raised to the rank of baron. When Richard of York returned in 1460 and claimed the throne, Lord Neville initially posed as an ally, but went back to the Lancastrian side just before the Battle of Wakefield. York gave battle, likely thinking Neville would arrive to reinforce him, but was instead attacked and slain. Lord Neville himself, however, was killed shortly thereafter in an ambush leading up to the Battle of Towton in 1461. His son later inherited the earldom of Westmorland.

== Family and background ==
Arms of Neville: Gules, a saltire argent, with a fleur-de-lis azure on the center

He was born in about 1410, the second son of Sir John Neville (1387–1420) (eldest son and heir apparent of Ralph Neville, 1st Earl of Westmorland by his first wife Margaret de Stafford) by his wife Elizabeth Holland (c. 1388 – 1423), fifth daughter of Thomas Holland, 2nd Earl of Kent by his wife Alice FitzAlan (died 1416).

He had two brothers, Ralph Neville, 2nd Earl of Westmorland, and Sir Thomas Neville (died 1458) of Brancepeth Castle, County Durham, and one sister, Margaret Neville, who married Sir William Lucy of Woodcroft, Bedfordshire.

At sometime before 5 February 1452 he married (as her second husband) Anne Holland (died 1486), the daughter of John Holland, 2nd Duke of Exeter by his first wife Anne Stafford (a daughter of Edmund Stafford, 5th Earl of Stafford and the widow of Edmund Mortimer, 5th Earl of March). Anne Holland was the widow of his nephew Sir John Neville (died 1450), son of Ralph Neville, 2nd Earl of Westmorland by his first wife Lady Elizabeth Percy. Anne Holland outlived him and married, thirdly, to James Douglas, 9th Earl of Douglas (died 1491), but had no issue by him. She died 26 December 1486, and was buried in St. Anne's Chapel in the Blackfriars in the City of London. By Anne he had one son:

- Ralph Neville, 3rd Earl of Westmorland son and heir and heir to his uncle the 2nd Earl. He obtained a reversal of his father's attainder on 6 October 1472.

== Life ==
=== Neville–Neville rivalry ===
In the 1430s, John Neville's older brother, the Earl of Westmorland, waged what was virtually a private war with their uncle, the Earl of Salisbury, and the Beaufort branch of the Neville family, regarding an inheritance dispute. John joined his brother and played an important part in the struggle. He was mentioned in a 1438 letter to the king's chancellor reporting that the rival Nevilles had "assembled great routs and companies upon the field", done "great and horrible offences" and engaged "in slaughter and destruction" of the northern English local populace. The dispute was an uneven one, for the Earl of Salisbury was wealthier and better connected with powerful members of the nobility and clergy, aside from also being a blood relation of the English royal family. Salisbury got the better end of the dispute, and the parties were outwardly reconciled in 1443, in a settlement that heavily favoured the earl. The senior Nevilles, for their part, continued to resent their cousins over the matter. This rivalry ensured that, in the factional and turbulent politics of the 1450s, each branch of the family took opposite sides: when Salisbury and his son the Earl of Warwick sided with Richard, Duke of York, the senior branch took the side of the House of Lancaster, thus merging the family feud into the larger Wars of the Roses.

After the Neville settlement of 1443, the Earl of Westmorland appears to have largely given up his role in national politics, so it was his brother John whom the party of Queen Margaret of Anjou tried to recruit as an ally against the Duke of York and the earls of Salisbury and Warwick. Sir John Neville was summoned as a knight of the shire for the West Riding of Yorkshire to a great council which was to meet at Leicester on 21 May 1455. York, Salisbury and Warwick anticipated that charges would be brought against them at the meeting, so they intercepted and attacked the royal party at St Albans, their victory at which led to a brief protectorate by the Duke of York which lasted until February 1456. After the queen wrested back control over the government, she encouraged John Neville and his family to renew their rivalry in the north with York's ally, the Earl of Salisbury. In 1457, with the death of Salisbury's brother Robert, bishop of Durham, the queen secured the appointment of her man, Laurence Booth, to the vacant see. Booth (whose niece John's son later married) promptly began replacing Salisbury's relatives with members of the senior Neville branch in the administrative offices of the bishopric, with Sir John nominated justice of assize (becoming "the leading member of the Durham judiciary"). John also gained part of the goods sequestrated from the late bishop Robert.

=== Breakout of war ===
After the rout and flight of the Yorkist lords at Ludford in October 1459, Sir John Neville received substantial rewards comprising largely the forfeited estates and offices of the Earl of Salisbury. On 20 November 1459, he was raised to the peerage as Lord Neville by a writ of summons to parliament; this was the "Parliament of Devils", at which York and the junior Nevilles were attainted. On 19 December, "for good services against the rebels", he was appointed constable of Salisbury's castles of Middleham and Sheriff Hutton and steward of their associated lands, and was also granted a share of the forfeited lands of the Yorkist Sir John Conyers. In County Durham, Lord Neville became constable of Barnard Castle and master forester of Teesdale forest with an annuity of 40 marks. On 18 March 1460, he received another grant from Salisbury's empire: a yearly rent of 100 marks from the manors of Worton and Banbridge and the forest of Wensleydale.

Lord John responded to this patronage by raising men for the Lancastrian cause before their defeat at the Battle of Northampton in July 1460. He appears to have initially acquiesced to the new regime established by the Earl of Warwick in the aftermath of the battle, being summoned to parliament on 30 July 1460 and gaining initial trust from the Yorkists, who do not seem to have considered him an irreconcilable enemy. Neville was absent from the Parliament in October at which Richard, Duke of York claimed the throne, but was given a commission to proceed against the Lancastrian "rebels" assembling in the north. He then joined them instead, attending the muster of Margaret of Anjou in Yorkshire and being among those who devastated the northern estates of the Yorkist lords. Still, the Yorkist government (appearing to be unaware of this) put him on a commission of oyer and terminer on 8 December.

=== From Wakefield to Towton ===
In December the Duke of York marched north in person to deal with the unexpectedly quick rising of the queen and her supporters. Under pretence of being an ally, Lord Neville visited him and received a commission to raise men on the duke's behalf, but joined the enemy with his recruits. He was thus with the Lancastrian party at the ensuing Battle of Wakefield, 30 December, where York was defeated and slain. John's uncle and enemy, the Earl of Salisbury, and his son Sir Thomas Neville were also killed. One theory explaining why Richard of York left the safety of Sandal Castle to confront the stronger Lancastrian host is that he thought John Neville would arrive to reinforce him, but Neville then instead switched sides as soon as the duke exposed himself.

Lord Neville joined the queen's army which marched south and looted towns along the way. His troops in particular sacked Beverley on 12 January 1461. On the 20th, at York, John, his brother the Earl of Westmorland and other lords declared their approval of an agreement which entailed the cession of Berwick to the Scots in exchange for their support. Neville probably fought at the second Battle of St Albans on 17 February, where his cousin the Earl of Warwick, leading the Yorkists, was defeated. In March, the Yorkists once again marched north, now under the leadership of Richard of York's son Edward (proclaimed King Edward IV). Neville and his cousin Lord Clifford (whose grandmother was a Neville of the elder branch) commanded a force which ambushed the Yorkist vanguard under Warwick at the Battle of Ferrybridge at dawn on 28 March. While retreating north towards the main Lancastrian host, they were caught in a counter-ambush by John Neville's uncle William, Lord Fauconberg (of the junior Neville branch), at a valley called Dintingdale, near the village of Saxton. Neville, Clifford and most of their force were killed.

The Battle of Towton the following day secured the English throne for the House of York. Neville was attainted on 4 November 1461 and his lands escheated to the crown, leaving his widow unprovided for. John's son and heir, Ralph Neville, obtained a reversal of the attainder on 6 October 1472. Ralph later succeeded John's childless older brother as earl of Westmorland.

== Arms ==
Lord John Neville's coat of arms were the conventional Neville arms differenced by a fleur-de-lis azure on the center.

== Citations ==
Peerage of England
New creation	Baron Neville; 1459–1461	Succeeded by Ralph Neville
