= Neville–Neville feud =

Fifteenth-century feud within an English noble family

Neville family feud
- Part of fifteenth-century England
- Neville family coat of arms; this was worn by the senior branch, whilst Salisbury's—as a younger son—would have been differenced.
Date	c. 1428 – 26 August 1443; Hostilities resumed in the Wars of the Roses
Location	Northern England
Result	Political, dynastic, and financial victory for the Earl of Salisbury

Belligerents
Nevilles of Raby (senior branch)	Nevilles of Middleham (cadet branch)

Commanders and leaders
Earl of Westmorland	Earl of Salisbury

The Neville–Neville feud was an inheritance dispute in the north of England during the early fifteenth century between two branches of the noble Neville family. The inheritance in question was that of Ralph Neville, 1st Earl of Westmorland, a prominent northern nobleman who had issue from two marriages. Westmorland favoured as his heirs the children of his second wife, Joan Beaufort, closely related to the royal family, over those of his first wife, Margaret Stafford.

After Ralph Neville's death in 1425, many of the Neville family holdings were transferred through legal means to the children of Joan Beaufort (the Middleham cadet branch of the Neville family), in effect disinheriting the senior branch (the Nevilles of Raby). This led to more than a decade of rivalry between both branches of the family. Ralph Neville's eldest son, John Neville, had died before his father. John Neville's son, also named Ralph, became the 2nd earl of Westmorland. Though the title earl of Westmorland passed to the senior Nevilles, for legal reasons, many holdings, particularly those of the Neville patrimony in Yorkshire and Raby Castle in Durham were transferred to Joan and her children. The Beaufort Nevilles were also able to consolidate their control over the County Palatine of Durham after Robert Neville assumed the office of Bishop of Durham in 1437.

The senior branch disputed their disinheritance — both legally and by force of arms — but Joan Beaufort's eldest son, Richard Neville, prevailed due to his family's greater political connections. The feud continued through the 1430s, until an agreement was reached in 1443. This settlement was largely favourable to Salisbury, and both branches of the family remained at odds with each other. The dispute between the senior and junior branches of the Neville family continued into the Wars of the Roses. During the prolonged civil war, the senior branch sided with the Lancastrians, while their cousins sided with the Yorkists. Margaret Stafford's grandsons gave Salisbury no support during the conflict and he was captured fighting for Richard of York at the Battle of Wakefield. Rather than being ransomed according to the usual custom of the time, Salisbury was beheaded by the common people "who loved him not."

== Background and causes ==
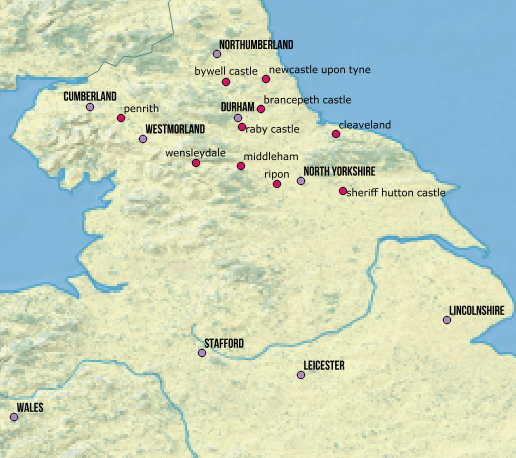
Neville holdings in Yorkshire, Cumberland, Northumberland, Westmorland and Durham in the 15th century.

Disputes over divided inheritances were not uncommon in later medieval England; apart from the dispute between branches of the Neville family, there were similar disputes within the Talbot and Mountford families. Historian Michael Hicks described these three disputes, where property was transferred from a senior line to a junior line, as "particularly large scale and high profile".

Ralph Neville, the 1st earl of Westmorland (c. 1364–1425) married twice. His first wife Margaret Stafford, daughter of the earl of Stafford, died in 1396. Shortly after her death, Ralph Neville married Joan Beaufort, daughter of John of Gaunt and cousin of King Richard II. They had 9 sons and 5 daughters together: the eldest, Richard Neville, became earl of Salisbury; their second son, William Neville, became earl of Kent and was created Baron Fauconberg; George Neville became the 1st Baron Latimer, Edward Neville was Baron Abergavenny and their youngest, Robert Neville, eventually assumed the office of Bishop of Durham. Historian Anthony Tuck writes that this marriage "was to have major consequences both for the Neville family and for the English nobility" throughout the 15th century.

Neville's new proximity to the royal family through his marriage to the Richard II's cousin, and his loyalty to the Crown during the crisis of July 1397, led to his elevation to the peerage as earl of Westmorland in 1397. Joan and Ralph were granted numerous offices, lands, wardships and pensions. They continued to enjoy royal favour until the death of King Henry IV in 1413.

The Neville patrimony included lands in Yorkshire, Durham, Westmorland and Cumberland. After marrying Joan Beaufort, Ralph Neville began the process of disinheriting the children from his first marriage through a legal process called enfeoffment. The earl's eldest son John Neville, had previously agreed to a settlement in which he would inherit only Raby Castle and Brancepeth Castle in Durham. This transfer of property to the cadet branch resulted in the "virtual disinheritance" of the senior branch of the family. It was done legally and left the senior Nevilles with no legal recourse. Charles Ross has noted that the earl's eldest son does not seem to have attempted to stop his father or prevent his son's disinheritance, but may even have assisted with some of the transfers.

This process of transfer of property, the so-called "Neville trust" or "Neville–Beaufort trust", had as its architect William Gascoigne, one of the crown's most prominent lawyers. This might reflect an interest of the crown in retaining the Neville lands with Beaufort descendants, who would be closely related to the royal family due to their shared Lancastrian ancestry.

== Course of the dispute ==
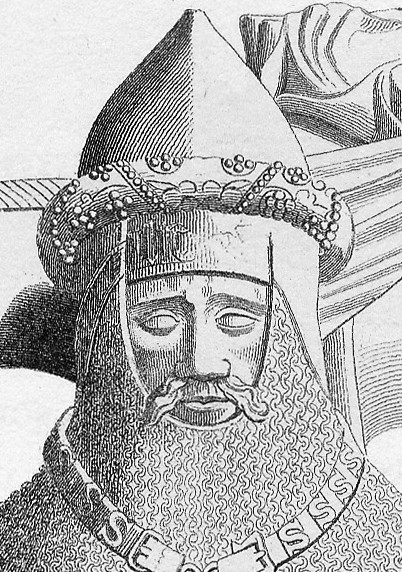
Drawing of Ralph Neville, 1st Earl of Westmorland's tomb.

When Ralph Neville died in 1425, the title earl of Westmorland passed to his eldest grandson Ralph "in tail male", but neither of his sons by Margaret Stafford were mentioned in his will. Joan immediately took possession of Middleham Castle, Penrith Castle and Sheriff Hutton Castle for her eldest son. She also held Raby Castle in Durham as part of her dower until her death in 1440. Historian J. R. Lander has written that the second earl of Westmorland was as "poor in land as an Earl as his father had been in early life as a baron."

Only some estates in Brancepeth, Northumberland, Lincolnshire, two inns in London and Newcastle upon Tyne, Bywell Castle and property in Ripon were left for the senior Neville inheritance. The vast Yorkshire properties of Middleham Castle, Sheriff Hutton Castle and Wensleydale all went to Richard Neville, who also became Warden of the West March when he inherited the Honour of Penrith in Cumberland. His wife, 15-year-old Alice Montagu, was the sole heir of the late Earl of Salisbury, so Richard also inherited the title earl of Salisbury in 1428 when his father-in-law was killed in the Hundred Years' War.

Westmorland spent much of life trying to recover the properties at Middleham, Sheriff Hutton, Penrith and Raby, but he was largely unsuccessful, because Joan Beaufort had powerful allies amongst the nobility including Thomas Langley, the Bishop of Durham, and her brother Cardinal Beaufort. Langley withheld the patronage of the county palatine from the second earl, and denied him any available official offices or positions under the bishop's grant. Westmorland entered into recognisances with the Beaufort-Nevilles in 1430, after Salisbury brought the matter before the King's council. When Salisbury departed for the Hundred Years' War in 1431 and again in 1436, Westmorland was once again bound over to keep the King's peace. However, in 1435, complaints from the North reached the Lord Chancellor that the dispute between the elder and junior branches of the Neville family had resulted in the assembling "by manner of war and insurrection, great routs and companies upon the field, which have done all manner of great offences".

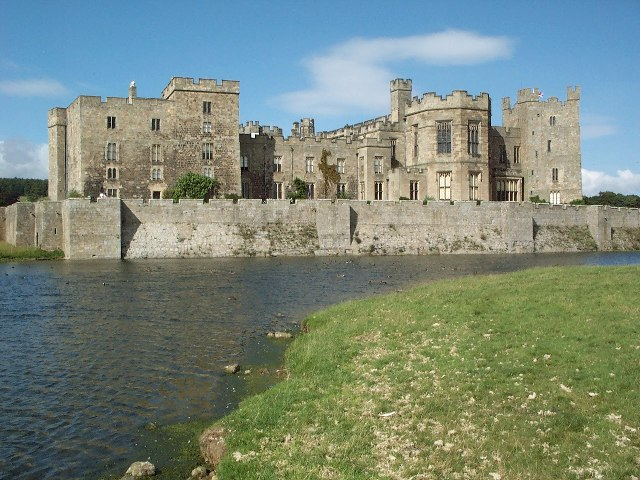
Raby Castle, seat of the Neville Earls of Westmorland, until it was inherited by Joan Beaufort, who held the Durham property in dower until her death in 1440.

When the bishop of Durham died in 1437, Cardinal Beaufort used his influence on the king's council to help Joan's younger son Robert Neville become the new bishop. The House of Beaufort was able to gradually consolidate its control over the holding. By 1441, Salisbury's younger brother Lord Fauconberg was steward and military commander of Durham. There were a number of attempts to arbitrate a settlement in council, and between 1441 and 1443 both parties were constrained by bonds not to enter each other's estates except with permission. Historian R. L. Storey has questioned—with Salisbury being such a significant member of the council—whether Westmorland ever had "much faith in its impartiality".

== Aftermath and consequences ==
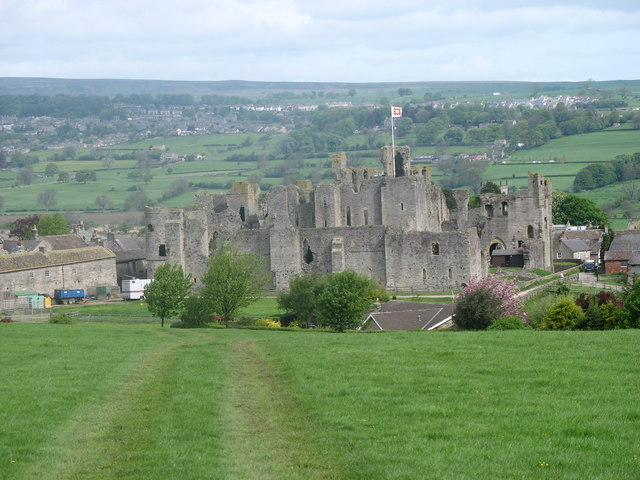
Middleham Castle, seat of Joan Beaufort and later her son the Earl of Salisbury.

A peace was finally agreed between Salisbury and Westmorland on 26 August 1443. Pollard writes that the "settlement" signified a "crushing defeat" for Ralph II and that the "odds had been heavily stacked" against him from the start. True, he was confirmed in his right to the Lordship of Raby Castle, but had to surrender everything else he had previously claimed from Salisbury back to him. He was also placed in bonds of £400 to keep to the agreement in the future, not just to Salisbury, but to his four brothers as well. Westmorland had to renounce all claims to the Neville lands in County Durham, and had to pay annual rents to Salisbury for various Northumberland manors. Salisbury was not subject to similar constraints, merely having to agree to not claim the £400 pension while Westmorland adhered to their agreement.

J. R. Lander described the Neville–Neville feud as illustrating how the Neville family "never could and never did work together". The dispute between the senior and junior branches of the Neville family continued into the Wars of the Roses. During the prolonged conflict that ravaged the English nobility, Westmorland gave his half-brother no support at all; in fact Westmorland's younger brother, Lord John Neville died fighting for the Lancastrian Henry VI at the Battle of Towton in 1461. Salisbury himself was captured at the Battle of Wakefield and instead of being ransomed, he was beheaded by the common people, who "loved him not." Lander also suggested that if had been united as a family behind Salisbury, who supported Richard of York during the Wars of the Roses, York's "power in the land would have been overwhelming".

== See also ==
- Bonville–Courtenay feud
- Berkeley-Lisle feud
