= John Holland, 2nd Duke of Exeter =

English nobleman and admiral (1395–1447)

John Holland
- Duke of Exeter; Earl of Huntingdon and Ivry
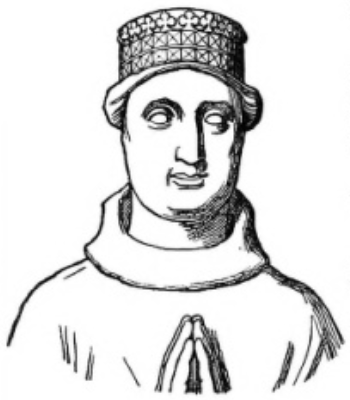
- John Holland's effigy, Chapel of St. Peter ad Vincula, Tower of London
- Born: 29 March 1395; Dartington, Devonshire, England
- Died: 5 August 1447 (aged 52); Stepney, Middlesex, England
- Buried: St Katharine's by the Tower, London
- Family: Holland
- Spouses: Lady Anne Stafford; Beatrice of Portugal; Lady Anne Montacute
- Issue more...: Henry Holland, 3rd Duke of Exeter; Anne Holland, Baroness Neville
- Father: John Holland, 1st Duke of Exeter
- Mother: Elizabeth of Lancaster

Arms of John Holland, 2nd Duke of Exeter

John Holland, 2nd Duke of Exeter, 2nd Earl of Huntingdon (29 March 1395 – 5 August 1447) was an English nobleman and military commander during the Hundred Years' War. His father, the 1st Duke of Exeter, was a maternal half-brother to Richard II of England, and was executed after King Richard's deposition. The Holland family estates and titles were forfeited, but John was able to recover them by dedicating his career to royal service. Earl of Huntingdon, of the Castle, town, manor of Barnstable and manors of Dartington, Fremington, South Molton, Torrington, Devon, Stevington, Bedfordshire, Ardington, Berkshire, Haslebury, Blagdon and Somerset. Holland rendered great assistance to his cousin Henry V in his conquest of France, fighting both on land and on the sea. He was marshal and admiral of England and governor of Aquitaine under Henry VI.

== Origins ==
He was the second son of John Holland, 1st Duke of Exeter, by his wife Elizabeth of Lancaster. His paternal grandparents were Thomas Holland, 1st Earl of Kent, and Joan of Kent (a granddaughter of King Edward I), who after Holland's death had married Edward, the Black Prince. His father was a half-brother of King Richard II of England, and through his mother he was nephew of Henry IV of England, a first cousin of Henry V of England, and a first cousin once removed of Henry VI of England.

== Career ==
Holland was just a boy when his father conspired against Henry IV and was attainted and executed. Nevertheless, he was given a chance to serve Henry V in the 1415 campaign in France, where he distinguished himself at Agincourt. The next year Holland was restored in blood and to his father's earldom of Huntingdon, and was made a Knight of the Garter. (His older brother Richard had died in 1400.) Over the next five years he held various important commands with the English forces in France and in 1420 was made Constable of the Tower of London. He was captured by the French in 1421 at the Battle of Baugé and spent four years in captivity, not being released until 1425.

== Marriages and issue ==
He married three times:

- Firstly, on 6 March 1427 to Lady Anne Stafford (d. 20 or 24 September 1432), widow of Edmund Mortimer, 5th Earl of March, and daughter of Edmund Stafford, 5th Earl of Stafford. By Anne he had two children:
  - Henry Holland, 3rd Duke of Exeter (1430–1475).
  - Lady Anne Holland (d. 26 December 1486), who married, firstly, Sir John Neville (d. before 16 March 1450), son of her second cousin Ralph Neville, 2nd Earl of Westmorland. The marriage is said to have been unconsummated. She was married, secondly, to her second cousin, John Neville, Baron Neville (uncle of her first husband), slain at the Battle of Towton on 29 March 1461. She married, thirdly, James Douglas, 9th Earl of Douglas.
- Secondly, on 20 January 1433, he married Beatrice of Portugal;
- Thirdly, he married Lady Anne Montagu (d. 28 November 1457), a daughter of John Montacute, 3rd Earl of Salisbury.

== Mistresses ==
By an unnamed mistress or mistresses he also had several illegitimate children, two of whom he named in his will. William, Thomas and Robert, the so-called "Bastards of Exeter", were active in the Lancastrian struggles, and Stow reported that two of them were among the notable dead at the Battle of Towton.

== Appointments ==
In July 1416 he was appointed Lieutenant General to High Admiral of England Thomas Beaufort, Duke of Exeter (the post later became known as Lieutenant of the Admiralty) until 1435. In November 1432 he was made Deputy Marshall of England until September 1436. In 1435 he was appointed High Admiral of England, Ireland and Aquitaine. In March 1438 Holand was appointed Commander of the Army for relieving the castle of Guînes. In 1439 he was made the king's lieutenant in Aquitaine. He was made count of Ivry in France by John, Duke of Bedford. Holland recovered his father's dukedom of Exeter on 6 January 1443/1444, and was given precedence just below the Duke of York. He was succeeded as duke by his son Henry.

== Death and burial ==
There is an effigy of this John Holland in the Chapel of St. Peter ad Vincula in the Tower of London. It had originally been in St Katharine by the Tower.

John Holland, 2nd Duke of Exeter Born: 29 March 1395 Died: 5 August 1447
Political offices
Preceded by The Duke of Bedford	Lord High Admiral of England; 1435–1447	Succeeded by The Earl of Suffolk
Peerage of England
Vacant Forfeiture Title last held by John Holland	Duke of Exeter; 1443 – 1447	Succeeded by Henry Holland
Vacant Forfeiture Title last held by John Holland	Earl of Huntingdon; 1416 – 1447	Succeeded by Henry Holland
