= Hornby, Richmondshire =

Village and civil parish in North Yorkshire, England

Coordinates: 54.33943°N 1.66000°W

Hornby
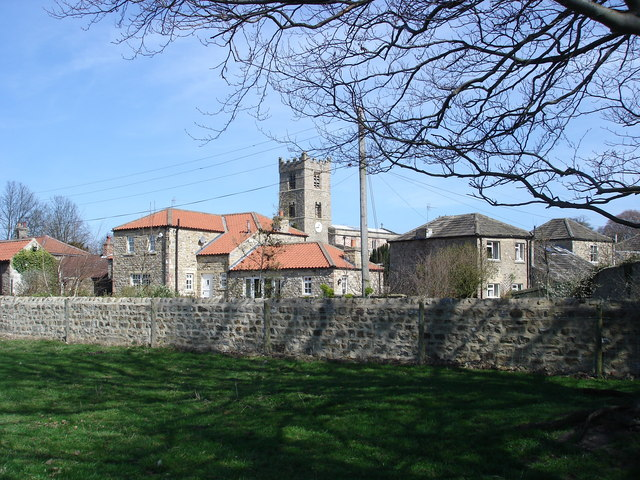
- The village of Hornby and the Church of Saint Mary

- Location within North Yorkshire
- Population: 280 (Including Appleton East and West, and Arrathorne 2011 census)
- OS grid reference: SE222938
- Civil parish: Hornby
- Unitary authority: North Yorkshire
- Ceremonial county: North Yorkshire
- Region: Yorkshire and the Humber
- Country: England
- Sovereign state: United Kingdom
- Post town: Bedale
- Postcode district: DL8
- Police: North Yorkshire
- Fire: North Yorkshire
- Ambulance: Yorkshire

Hornby is a small village and civil parish located about 4 miles (6.4 km) north-west of Bedale in the county of North Yorkshire, England.

== Etymology ==
The name of the village is first attested in the Domesday Book of 1086 as Hornebi and Horneby. It derives from the Old Norse personal name Horni and the word bý ('farm'). Thus the name once meant 'farm belonging to Horni'.

== Governance ==
Hornby is part of the electoral ward of Hornby Castle. This ward stretches north to Brough with St. Giles, with a total population of 1,766.

From 1974 to 2023 it was part of the district of Richmondshire, it is now administered by the unitary North Yorkshire Council.

== See also ==
- Listed buildings in Hornby, Richmondshire
