= Hornby Castle, North Yorkshire =

Castle in North Yorkshire, England

Coordinates: 54.339°N 1.653°W

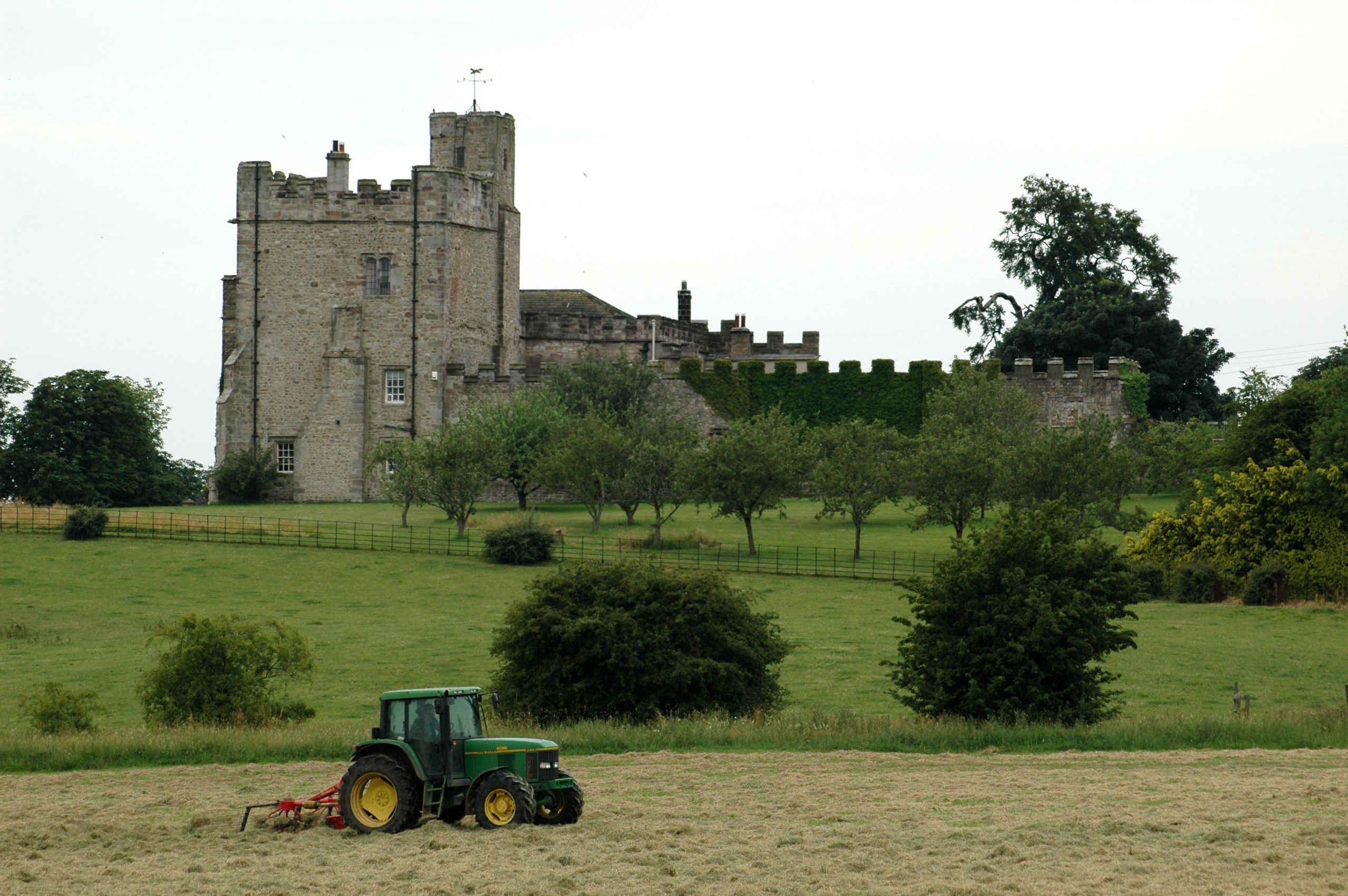
Hornby Castle today

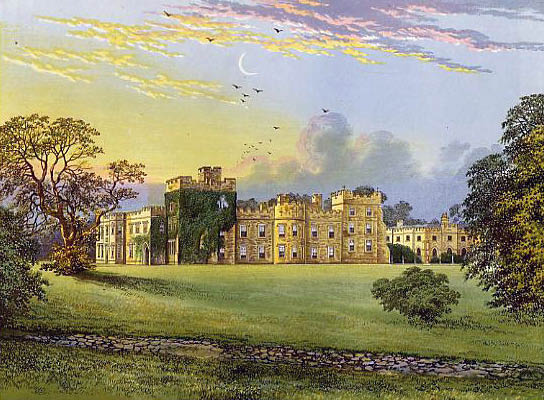
Hornby Castle before partial demolition

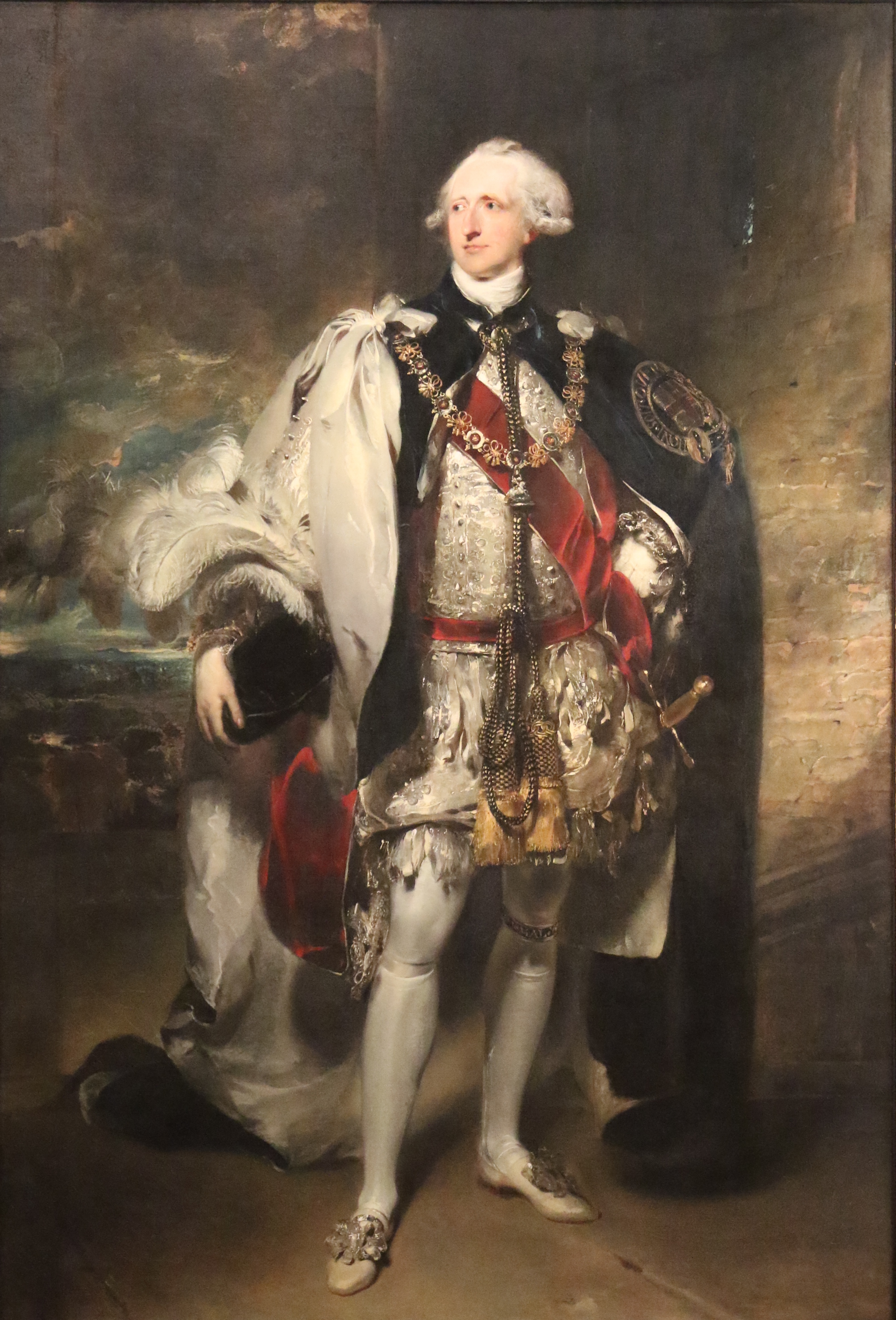
Portrait of the Duke of Leeds by Thomas Lawrence, 1796

Hornby Castle is a grade I listed fortified manor house in the village of Hornby on the edge of Wensleydale between Bedale and Leyburn, in the county of North Yorkshire, England.

Originally 14th century, it was remodelled in the 15th, 18th and 20th centuries. It is constructed of coursed sandstone rubble with lead and stone-slate roofs. The present building is the south range of a larger complex, the rest of which has been demolished.

== History ==
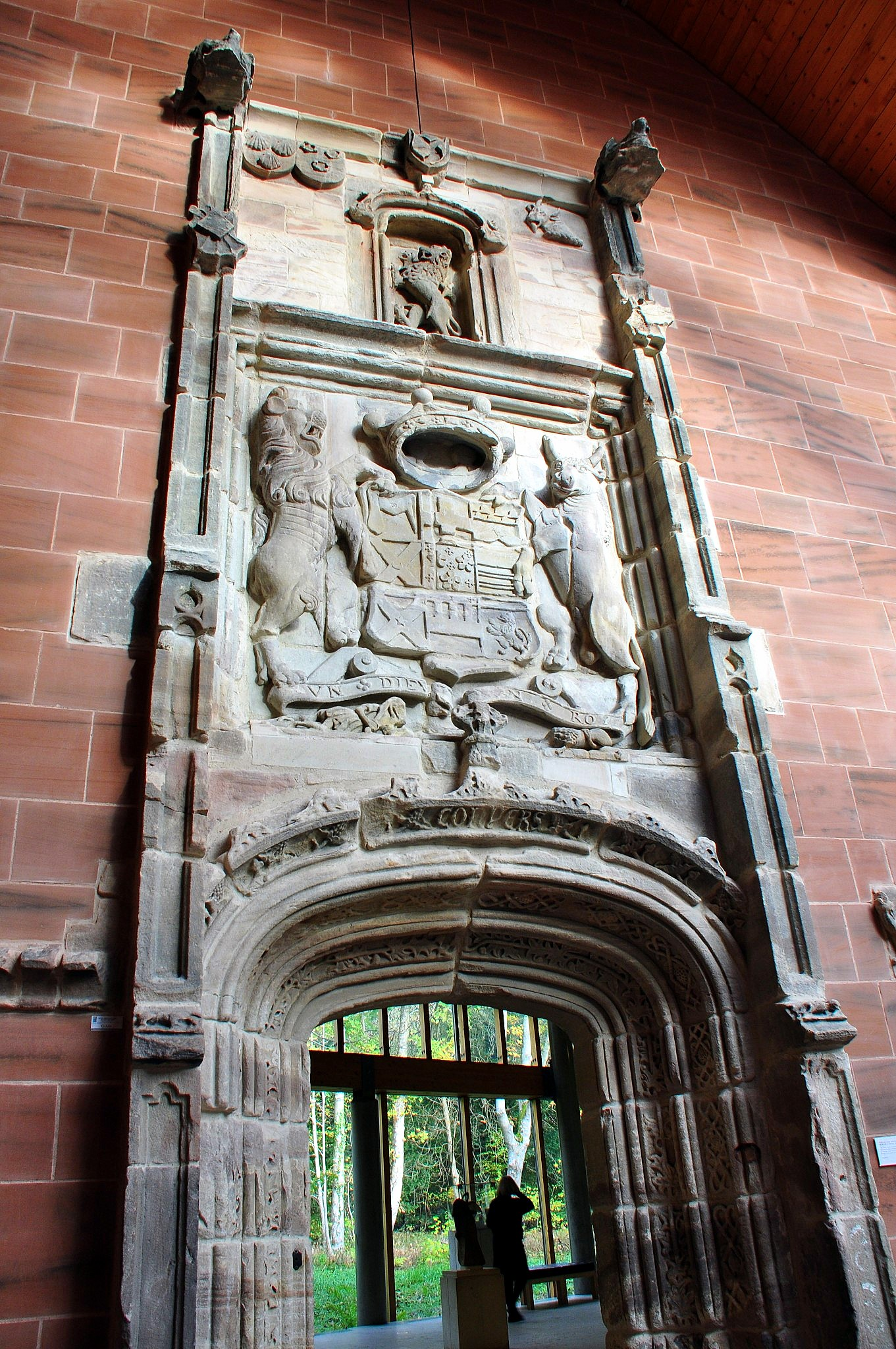
Sandstone portal from Hornby Castle, Yorkshire. 6.86 x 2.29 m. The Burrell Collection

At the end of the 14th century Hornby castle belonged to the St Quintin family until heiress Margaret Quintin married John Conyers (died 1422).

It was largely rebuilt in the fifteenth century by William Conyers, 1st Baron Conyers, but retained the fourteenth-century St Quintin’s tower (demolished in 1927) named after the previous owners. On the death in 1557 of John Conyers, 3rd Baron Conyers, the estate passed to his daughter Elizabeth, who was married to Thomas Darcy. It descended in the Darcy family (made the Earls of Holderness in 1682) to Robert Darcy, 4th Earl of Holderness, who died in 1778. Conyers Darcy, 2nd Earl of Holderness, was elected MP for Boroughbridge in 1660 and for Yorkshire in 1661.

During the English Civil War the castle was taken by Colonel Ralph Assheton, commander-in-chief of the Parliamentary forces in North Lancashire, but an order to slight it was not carried out. The house was largely rebuilt in the 1760s by John Carr of York, who was responsible for the surviving south range and the east range (demolished in the 1930s) and outbuildings, for the 4th Earl of Holderness.

The 4th Earl's daughter and heir, Amelia, Baroness Darcy and Baroness Conyers, married Francis Osborne, Marquess of Carmarthen, who later became the 5th Duke of Leeds. He assembled at Hornby rich early eighteenth-century furniture from several houses, illustrated in the books of Percy Macquoid. On Amelia's death in 1784 the estate passed to her son George Osborne, 6th Duke of Leeds (1775–1838). After Kiveton Hall was demolished in 1811 Hornby became the main seat of the Dukes of Leeds until George Osborne, 9th Duke of Leeds.

In 1930 the estate was broken up and most of the house demolished. A 16th-century main doorway is preserved in the Burrell Collection, Glasgow.

The remaining property, originally the south range, was bought in 1936 by Major-General Walter E. Clutterbuck and passed down to his grandson Roger Clutterbuck. The castle grounds include a deer park and working farm. As a private residence the castle is not open to the public, though the gardens are at certain times of the year.

== See also ==
- Grade I listed buildings in North Yorkshire (district)
- Listed buildings in Hornby, Richmondshire
- Hornby Castle, Lancashire
