= Ralph Neville, 2nd Earl of Westmorland =

English noble (c. 1406–1484)

Ralph Neville Earl of Westmorland
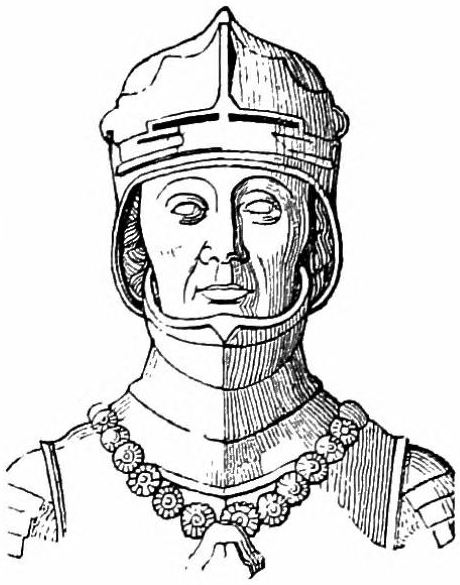
- Drawing of his effigy, after Charles Stothard
- Born: c. 1406; Cockermouth Castle, Cumberland
- Died: 3 November 1484 (aged 78)
- Resting place: St. Brandon's Church, Brancepeth
- Spouse(s): Elizabeth Percy; Margaret Cobham
- Children: 2 (both died young)
- Relatives: Sir John Neville (father); Elizabeth Holland (mother); Ralph, 1st Earl (grandfather); Ralph, 3rd Earl (nephew); John, Lord Neville (brother)
- Family: Neville

Ralph Neville, 2nd Earl of Westmorland (c. 1406 – 3 November 1484) was an English nobleman in northern England.

== Origins ==
Ralph Neville was born at Cockermouth Castle (which was temporarily in Neville family hands following a rebellion of the rival Percy family), Cumberland in northern England, and was baptized there on 4 April 1406. He was the eldest son of Sir John Neville (d. 1420), and Elizabeth Holland (c. 1388–1423), daughter of Thomas Holland, 2nd Earl of Kent.

He had two brothers, John Neville, Baron Neville (c. 1410 – 1461), who was killed at the Battle of Towton on 29 March 1461, and Sir Thomas Neville (died 22 February 1458) of Brancepeth, and one sister, Margaret, who married Sir William Lucy of Woodcroft, Bedfordshire.

== Career ==
When his father died shortly before 20 May 1420 while campaigning in France, Ralph Neville became heir apparent to his grandfather, Ralph Neville, 1st Earl of Westmorland. He succeeded to the earldom in 1425, but spent much of the rest of his life attempting to recover his inheritance, which his grandfather, the 1st Earl, had settled on his second wife, Lady Joan Beaufort (d.13 November 1440), the legitimated daughter of John of Gaunt and the children he had had by her, giving rise to the Neville–Neville feud.

In 1426, Westmorland had licence to enter his lands, and on 14 May of that year was knighted by King Henry VI. In the same year he married Elizabeth Percy, the daughter of Sir Henry Percy (1364–1403), KG (Hotspur), and widow of John Clifford, 7th Baron Clifford. They had one son, Sir John Neville, who married his second cousin-once-removed Lady Anne Holland, the daughter of John Holland, 2nd Duke of Exeter, and died without issue shortly before 16 March 1450.

Westmorland married secondly, before February 1442, Margaret Cobham, 4th Baroness Cobham (d. 1466x71), daughter and heiress of Reginald Cobham, 3rd Baron Sterborough, 3rd Lord Cobham, and sister-in-law of Humphrey, Duke of Gloucester. By her, he had one daughter, Margaret, who died young.

As noted, Westmorland was involved in an ongoing struggle (the Neville–Neville feud), sometimes violent, to regain his inheritance from his grandfather's second wife, Lady Joan Beaufort, and his half-uncle Richard Neville, 5th Earl of Salisbury, Cardinal Henry Beaufort, and Thomas Langley, Bishop of Durham. Lady Joan Beaufort died in 1440, and eventually, a settlement was reached in 1443 which, according to Pollard, represented a "crushing defeat" for Neville, who regained the barony of Raby but was forced to concede the rest of the disputed lands to Salisbury.

Westmorland was appointed a Commissioner of Array in 1459 and 1461, and is said to have led troops raised in his name on the Lancastrian side in Durham in November 1460, but otherwise took little part in the military campaigns or political affairs of the day, and according to Pollard had by this time 'succumbed to a mental disorder', and been placed under the guardianship of his brother, Sir Thomas Neville (died 1458). Westmorland's two brothers gained some influence in the late 1450s, but the death of his brother John (c. 1410 – 1461) at the Battle of Towton and his subsequent attainder on 4 November 1461 put an end to any renewed hope of the recovery of Westmorland's inheritance. Sir Humphrey Neville (c. 1439 – 1469), son and heir of Westmorland's brother, Sir Thomas, took up the cause for a time against his cousin Richard Neville, 16th Earl of Warwick, the 'Kingmaker', who championed the position taken earlier by the Beauforts, but Humphrey was beheaded on 29 September 1469.

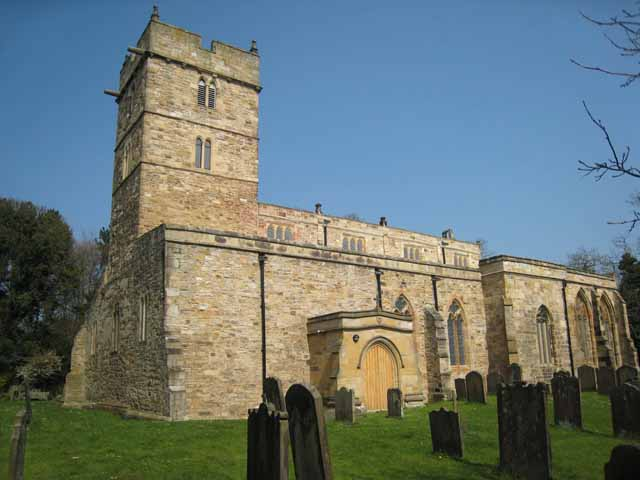
St. Brandon's Church, Brancepeth

According to Pollard, it is unclear who, if anyone, became Westmorland's guardian after the death of his brother, Sir Thomas Neville; however, surviving documents indicate that Richard, Duke of Gloucester, the future Richard III, acquired an interest in Westmorland's estates, and occasionally used Raby Castle as his own residence.

== Death ==
Westmorland died on 3 November 1484, and was buried at St. Brandon's church, Brancepeth, Durham. He was predeceased by his second wife, Margaret, who died between 20 November 1466 and 26 April 1471, and was buried in the church of the Greyfriars, Doncaster. Westmorland was succeeded in the earldom by his nephew, Ralph Neville.

== Literature ==
Westmorland is among the historical figures who appear in the opening scene of Shakespeare's Henry VI, Part 3.

== Footnotes ==
Peerage of England
Preceded by Ralph Neville; 1st Earl	Earl of Westmorland; 1425–1484	Succeeded by Ralph Neville; 3rd Earl
