= Joan Beaufort, Countess of Westmorland =

English noblewoman (c. 1379–1440)

Joan Beaufort
- Countess of Westmorland
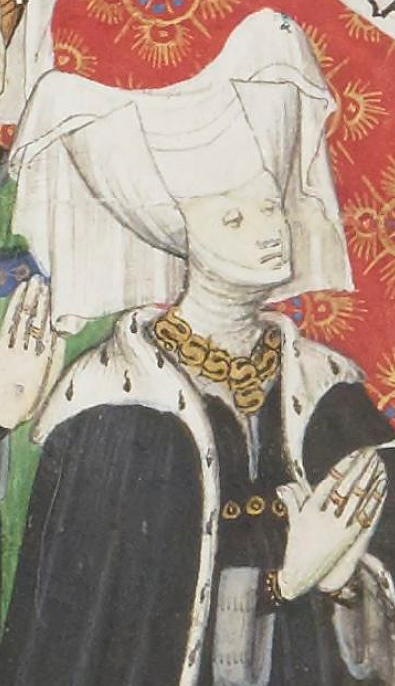
- Image of the Countess of Westmorland in the Neville Hours
- Born: c. 1379
- Died: 13 November 1440 (aged 60–61); Howden, Yorkshire, England
- Buried: Lincoln Cathedral, Lincolnshire, England
- Family: Beaufort
- Spouses: Robert Ferrers of Wem (m. 1391; died 1396) Ralph de Neville, 1st Earl of Westmorland (m. 1396; died 1425)
- Issue more...: Katherine Mowbray, Duchess of Norfolk; Eleanor Percy, Countess of Northumberland; Richard Neville, 5th Earl of Salisbury; Robert Neville, Bishop of Durham; William Neville, 1st Earl of Kent; George Neville, 1st Baron Latimer; Anne Stafford, Duchess of Buckingham; Edward Neville, 3rd Baron Bergavenny; Cecily Neville, Duchess of York
- Father: John of Gaunt
- Mother: Katherine Swynford

Arms of the Beaufort family, legitimised descendants of John of Gaunt: Royal arms of King Edward III within a bordure compony argent and azure

Joan Beaufort (c. 1379 – 13 November 1440) was the youngest of the four legitimised children and only daughter of John of Gaunt, 1st Duke of Lancaster (third surviving son of King Edward III), and his mistress, later third wife, Katherine Swynford. She married Ralph Neville, 1st Earl of Westmorland, and in her widowhood, she became a powerful landowner in the north of England, as countess of Westmorland. Through her daughter Cecily, Joan was the maternal grandmother of kings Edward IV and Richard III, and great-great-grandmother of Henry VIII.

== Early life ==
The year and place of Joan's birth is unknown. She may have been born at Kettlethorpe in Lincolnshire, the seat of the Swynford family, or at Pleshey in Essex, the home of Joan Fitzalan, Countess of Hereford. The usual date given for Joan's birth is 1379, as wine was ordered by John of Gaunt to be sent with all speed to Kettlethorpe in that year and he dated a couple of documents at that time from Kettlethorpe; thus, Joan's father may have been present for her birth or arrived shortly thereafter. Alison Weir, however, believes 1377 may be more accurate. Joan may have been named after Joan of Kent, at the time of her birth Dowager Princess of Wales. In September 1396 she, together with her siblings, the children of John of Gaunt and Katherine Swynford, were legitimised by papal bull.

== Marriages and issue ==
=== First marriage ===
In 1386 her father arranged for her to be betrothed to Robert Ferrers, 5th Baron Boteler of Wem (d. c. 1395). The marriage took place in 1391/2 at Beaufort-en-Vallée, Anjou and the couple remained in the household of her father. Ferrers died only three years after the marriage, having had two daughters by Joan:

- Elizabeth Ferrers, 6th Baroness Boteler of Wem (1393–1474). She married John de Greystoke, 4th Baron Greystoke (1389–1436) on 28 October 1407 in Greystoke Castle, Greystoke, Cumberland, and had issue. She is buried at Black Friars Church, York.
- Mary or Margery (1394 – 25 January 1457/1458). She married her stepbrother, Sir Ralph Neville, son of Ralph Neville, 1st Earl of Westmoreland, before 1411 in Oversley, Warwickshire and had issue.

=== Second marriage ===
Arms of Neville: Gules, a saltire argent. Borne by Joan's progeny but with difference a of label three points compony of Beaufort (i.e. compony argent and azure)

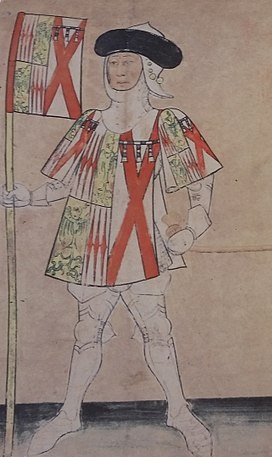
Richard Neville, 5th Earl of Salisbury, who displays the arms of Neville (tinctures transposed in error) with a label compony of Beaufort for difference. Salisbury Roll of Arms

In November 1396 Joan married, secondly, to the recently widowed Ralph Neville, 1st Earl of Westmorland (d. 1425), who had twelve children by his first wife and fathered a further fourteen by Joan. On the marriage her father settled on the couple for life an annuity of £206 13s 4d. The couple's primary residence was the ancient Neville seat of Raby Castle in the county of Durham. Joan Beaufort and Ralph Neville had the following 14 children:

- Lady Katherine Neville (c. 1397 – c. 1483), married, firstly, on 12 January 1411 John Mowbray, 2nd Duke of Norfolk; married, secondly, Sir Thomas Strangways; married, thirdly, John Beaumont, 1st Viscount Beaumont; married, fourthly, Sir John Woodville (d. 12 August 1469).
- Lady Eleanor Neville (c. 1398 – 1472), married, firstly, Richard le Despenser, 4th Baron Burghersh, married, secondly, Henry Percy, 2nd Earl of Northumberland.
- Richard Neville, 5th Earl of Salisbury (1400–1460), married Alice Montacute, suo jure 5th Countess of Salisbury. Had issue
- Henry Neville (c. 1402), died in infancy
- Robert Neville (1404–1457), Bishop of Durham
- William Neville, 1st Earl of Kent (c. 1405 – 1463), married Joan Fauconberg
- John Neville (c. 1406), died in infancy
- George Neville, 1st Baron Latimer (c. 1407 – 1469)
- Lady Anne Neville (c. 1408 – 1480), married Humphrey Stafford, 1st Duke of Buckingham.
- Thomas Neville (c. 1410), died as a child
- Cuthbert Neville (c. 1411), died in infancy
- Joan Neville (c. 1412 – 1453), became a nun of the Order of St. Clare
- Edward Neville, 3rd Baron Bergavenny (c. 1414 – 1476), married Elizabeth Beauchamp
- Lady Cecily Neville (1415–1495) ("Proud Cis"), married Richard, 3rd Duke of York, and mothered kings Edward IV and Richard III.

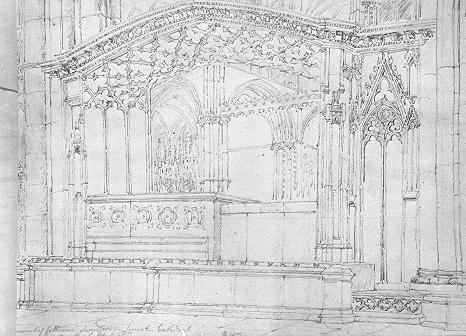
Joan Beaufort and mother Katherine Swynford's tomb – 1809 drawing

== Life ==
In 1399 Joan was made a Lady of the Order of the Garter (LG) by King Richard II. Although that king had created Ralph as the first Earl of Westmorland, Ralph sided with Joan's half-brother Henry Bolingbroke, who deposed Richard in 1399 and assumed the throne as King Henry IV. Joan and Ralph were granted numerous offices, lands, wardships and pensions under Henry IV. Joan was named in royal grants as "the King's sister."

Ralph and Joan used their relationship with Henry IV to seek out the best marriages for their children, often purchasing the wardships and marriages of children orphaned by aristocratic rebellions. For example, in 1423, Ralph purchased the wardship of Richard of York, 3rd Duke of York who lived with the family at Raby Castle and was accordingly later married to Cecily Neville, one of the daughters of Ralph and Joan. J. R. Lander called these machinations "the most amazing series of child marriages in English history." By the time of her death, Joan was the mother of an earl, three barons, a countess, three duchesses and a bishop.

In about 1413 Joan invited the mystic Margery Kempe to the family home and it is likely that she helped to fund Margery's pilgrimage to Jerusalem. In 1422 Joan acquired an indult permitting her to stay with any order of nuns attended by "eight honest women."

== Later life ==
After Ralph's death in 1425, the title Earl of Westmorland passed to Ralph's eldest grandson from his first marriage but many of the Neville lands were transferred to Joan's eldest son Richard Neville, 5th Earl of Salisbury. This sparked the Neville–Neville feud between the two lines descended from Ralph, which continued into the Wars of the Roses.

During her widowhood Joan became a patron of literature. In about 1430 Joan and her family were depicted by Pol de Limbourg in the Neville Hours. In 1428 Joan undertook a religious pilgrimage and joined the Sisterhood of the Abbey of St. Alban's. At some point during her widowhood Joan swore a vow of chastity.

== Death and burial ==
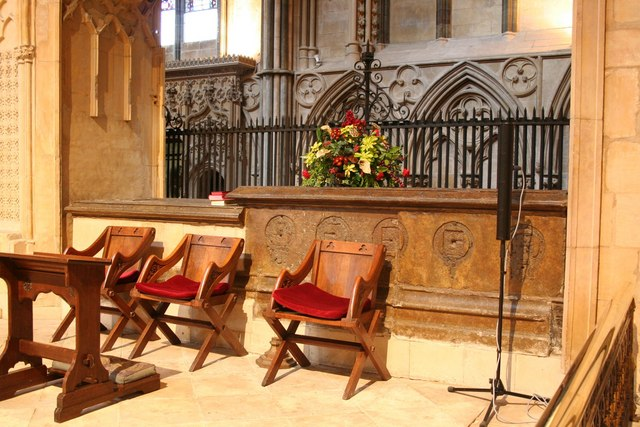
The tomb of Joan Beaufort and her mother Katherine Swynford the presbytery of Lincoln Cathedral.

Joan died on 13 November 1440 at Howden in Yorkshire and was buried beside her mother in Lincoln Cathedral.
