= John Mowbray, 3rd Duke of Norfolk =

English magnate and nobleman (1415–1461)

John Mowbray KG
- 3rd Duke of Norfolk (1397)
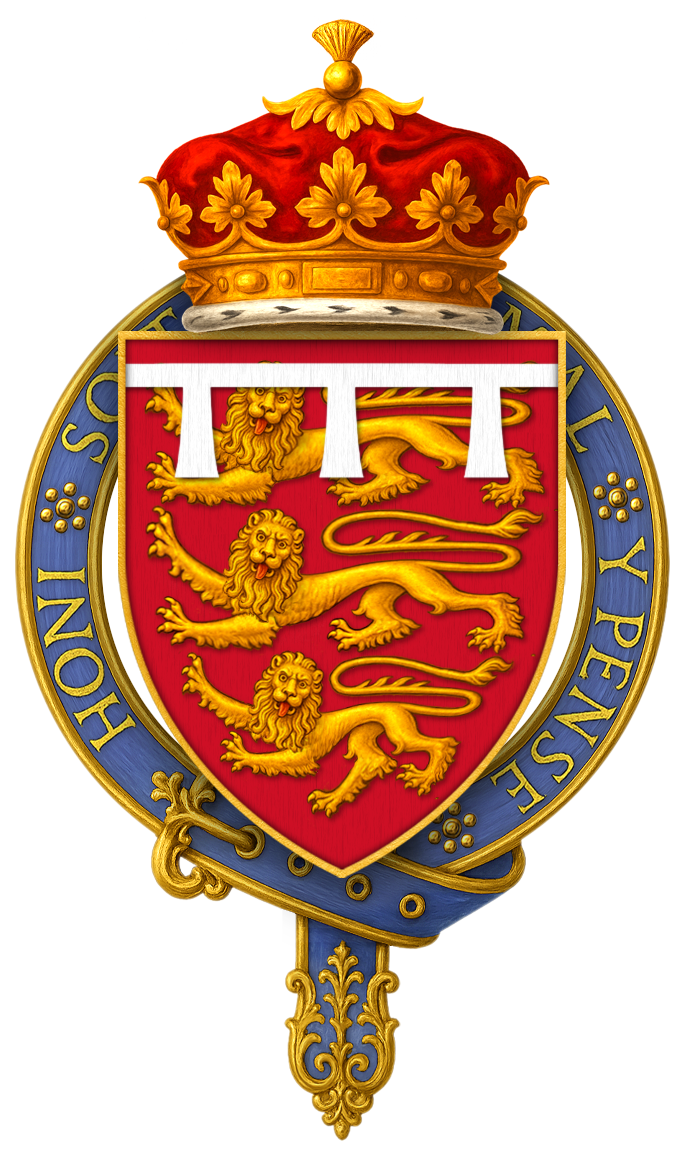
- Coat of arms
- Tenure: 19 October 1432 – 6 November 1461
- Other titles: 4th Earl of Nottingham (1383); 6th Earl of Norfolk (1312); 9th Baron Mowbray (1283); 10th Baron Segrave (1295)
- Born: 12 September 1415; Epworth, Lincolnshire, England
- Died: 6 November 1461 (aged 46)
- Buried: Thetford Priory
- Locality: East Anglia
- Wars and battles: Wars of the Roses; Second Battle of St Albans; Battle of Towton
- Offices: Earl Marshal; Warden of the Eastern March
- Spouse: Eleanor Bourchier
- Issue: John de Mowbray, 4th Duke of Norfolk
- House: Mowbray
- Father: John de Mowbray, 2nd Duke of Norfolk
- Mother: Katherine Neville

John Mowbray, 3rd Duke of Norfolk, KG, Earl Marshal (12 September 1415 – 6 November 1461) was a fifteenth-century English magnate who, despite having a relatively short political career, played a significant role in the early years of the Wars of the Roses. Mowbray was born in 1415, the only son and heir of John de Mowbray, 2nd Duke of Norfolk, and Katherine Neville. He inherited his titles upon his father's death in 1432. As a minor he became a ward of King Henry VI and was placed under the protection of Humphrey, Duke of Gloucester, alongside whom Mowbray would later campaign in France. He seems to have had an unruly and rebellious youth. Although the details of his misconduct are unknown, they were severe enough for the King to place strictures upon him and separate him from his followers. Mowbray's early career was spent in the military, where he held the wartime office of Earl Marshal. (Note: Along with the Lord High Constable of England, the marshalcy was one of the two great military officers of the medieval English crown, and has also been described as being of the "utmost importance in matters of ceremony and frequently involved questions of precedence", as well as being responsible for the marshalling of parliament. Archer notes, however, that "specific instances of the earl [marshal] undertaking tasks arising from his office are extremely rare".) Later he led the defence of England's possessions in Normandy during the Hundred Years' War. He fought in Calais in 1436, and during 1437–38 served as Warden of the Eastern March on the Anglo-Scottish border, before returning to Calais.

Mowbray's marriage to Eleanor Bourchier in the early 1430s drew him into the highly partisan and complex politics of East Anglia, and he became the bitter rival of William de la Pole, Earl (later Duke) of Suffolk. (Note: William de la Pole entered East Anglian political society in 1431, after fifteen years of campaign in France. His increasing power in East Anglia, which so often thwarted Mowbray's ambitions, was not confined to regional politics. Under a weak King such as Henry VI, de la Pole "virtually governed the country". According to Roger Virgo, Mowbray was "forced into a position of inferiority, even humiliation" by de la Pole's dominance.) Mowbray prosecuted his feuds with vigour, often taking the law into his own hands. This often violent approach drew the disapproving attention of the Crown, and he was bound over for massive sums and imprisoned twice in the Tower of London. His enemies, particularly de la Pole, also resorted to violent tactics. As a result, the local gentry looked to Mowbray for leadership, but often in vain; de la Pole was a powerful local force and a favourite of the King, while Mowbray was neither.

As law and order collapsed in eastern England, national politics became increasingly factional, with popular revolts against the King's councillors. Richard, Duke of York, who by the 1450s felt excluded from government, grew belligerent. He rebelled twice, and both times Mowbray defended King Henry. Eventually, Mowbray drifted towards York, with whom he shared enmity towards de la Pole. For much of the decade, Mowbray was able to evade direct involvement in the fractious political climate, and aligned with York early in 1460 until York's death later that year. In March 1461, Mowbray was instrumental in Edward's victory at the Battle of Towton, bringing reinforcements late in the combat. He was rewarded by the new regime but did not live to enjoy it. He died in November 1461, and was succeeded as Duke of Norfolk by his only son, John.

== Background and youth ==
John Mowbray was the only son of John de Mowbray, 2nd Duke of Norfolk, and his wife Katherine Neville, who was a daughter of Ralph Neville, 1st Earl of Westmorland, a powerful magnate in northern England. (Note: Westmorland's eldest son, Mowbray's uncle, Richard Neville, 5th Earl of Salisbury would later ally with Richard, 3rd Duke of York from the mid-1450s and into the early years of the Wars of the Roses; Salisbury's son was Richard Neville, 16th Earl of Warwick, known today as "Kingmaker.") The younger Mowbray was born on 12 September 1415 while his father was in France campaigning with Henry V. Mowbray was seventeen at his father's death and still legally a minor. During his minority, his estates were granted by Henry VI to Humphrey, Duke of Gloucester for a farm of 2000 marks (approximately £1,667). Until his majority, the Mowbray lands were administered by the English exchequer to the benefit of the crown, at a time when the government was in dire need of cash, due to the Hundred Years' War. Mowbray's wardship, and the right to arrange his marriage, was sold to Anne of Gloucester, Countess of Stafford for £2,000. By March 1434, Anne had arranged for Mowbray's marriage to her daughter Eleanor Bourchier.

For the good rewle and governaunce of my lord of Northfolk beyng in the Kynges ward, it semeth expedient that he as wele as tho that shall be a boute hys person kepe and observe as hit towcheth hem severally the rewle comprised in tharticles undir wryton ....

(I.e., For the benefit of the Duke of Norfolk as the King's ward, it is expedient that he and those with him obey the rules written below as far as he and his followers are affected by them)

— The National Archives, Chancery Masters' Exhibits, C 115/K2/6682 fo. 251, Ordinances for John Mowbray, Duke of Norfolk, c. 1435.

As a young adult, Mowbray appears to have been raucous and troublesome, and surrounded himself with equally unruly followers. This seems to have drawn the King's attention: Mowbray had only recently—with the other lords—sworn an oath in parliament not to recruit or welcome villains and wrong-doers into his affinity, nor to maintain them. He was summoned before the King and his council. Mowbray was instructed in how to conduct himself henceforth, and a precise regimen was imposed upon him. Exactly which aspects of Mowbray's behaviour were viewed as problematic is unknown, but since it resulted in unprecedented council-imposed restrictions upon him, his conduct must have been viewed as "abnormal". The ordinances not only dictated the time he should go to bed at night and rise in the morning, (Note: There was a religious focus to this regimen. Specific restrictions on Mowbray included having to rise between 6 am and 7 am each morning, attend matins, prime and the lesser hours with his own chaplain, then attend morning mass. A similar pattern was to be repeated in the evening, with prayers to the Virgin before a 10 pm curfew.) but the conditions addressed his demeanour also. His unruly followers were dismissed and replaced with those deemed suitable by Henry VI. Their stated role was to turn Mowbray towards "good reule and good governaunce," and they were not just to guide Mowbray but to report any disobedience of the council's instructions back to that body.

=== Inheritance ===
On his father's death in 1432, Mowbray inherited the office of Earl Marshal, but not yet his father's lands or titles. Mowbray's father lacked full control of his estates, as they were encumbered by two Mowbray dowagers, the elder Mowbray's mother Elizabeth Fitzalan (until her death in 1425), and his sister-in-law, Constance Holland. They each held a third of the inheritance as their dower, a situation which repeated itself on the elder Mowbray's death in 1432, leaving Constance and Katherine as the two dowagers. (Note: The legal concept of dower had existed since the late twelfth century as a means of protecting a woman from being left landless if her husband died first. He would, when they married, assign certain estates to her—a dos nominata, or dower—usually a third of everything he was seised of. By the fifteenth century, the widow was deemed entitled to her dower. The situation the Mowbray heirs experienced was not uncommon in the late middle ages. The Holland family inheritance had been more or less the same for the previous eighty years, but when the last Holland Earl of Kent Edmund inherited the title from his brother Thomas (who died childless), in 1404, the estates had to support the dowers of Edmund's mother Alice, his brother's widow, Joan Stafford, and his aunt, Elizabeth of Lancaster, Duchess of Exeter. Edmund died in 1408; his wife then became the fourth dowager on the inheritance, and, there being no male heirs, it was broken up and divided amongst them and Edmund's five sisters.) Constance died in 1437, but Mowbray's mother survived until around 1483. (Note: The precise date of Katherine Neville's death is unknown, but she is known to have attended the coronation of King Richard III in June 1483; Rowena Archer places her death as occurring at Epworth "in the late summer" that year.) Because of this, the historian Rowena Archer—who made one of the few full-length studies of the Mowbray family—described Mowbray as inheriting a "hopeless" and "onerous" legacy. It also had political consequences for the future. As he never held much property in the counties where his inheritance was (only holding, for example, seven of the twenty-six manors held by the Mowbrays in Norfolk and Suffolk), his influence was thus restricted there.

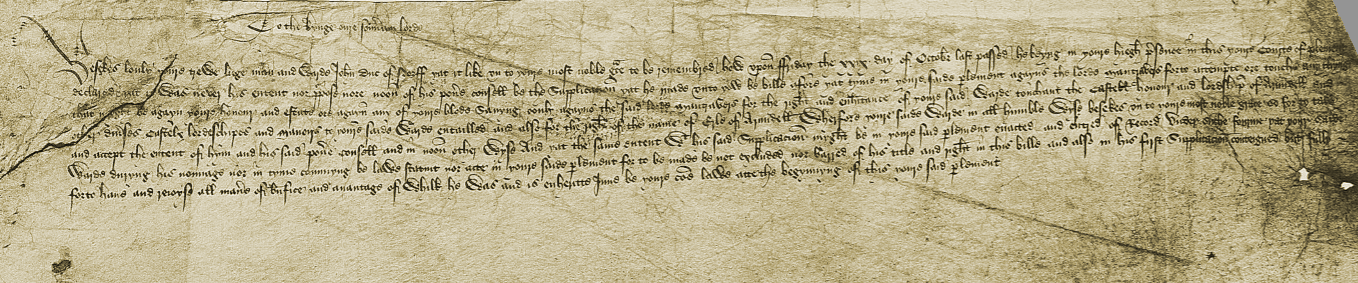
Mowbray's 1433 petition to parliament over the lordship of Arundel and the right to the earldom of Arundel

Immediately after his father's death, Mowbray made claim to the earldom of Arundel, setting him against John, Lord Maltravers, who had also made claim. This was an old dispute. Mowbray's father and grandfather had also sought the earldom, blocking Maltravers' father's claim. Mowbray based his right through his grandmother Elizabeth Fitzalan, Duchess of Norfolk; Maltravers through his great-grandfather Richard FitzAlan, 11th Earl of Arundel. In July 1433 Mowbray presented a petition to Parliament (receiving special permission to attend as a minor). Mowbray—"in a rather remarkable decision," says Archer—lost the case. Maltravers, though, died in May 1435 and so was never summoned to parliament under his new title. (Note: Since the next parliament was in October 1435. Rowena Archer considers this "proof that at a critical moment there was no substitute for the personal, determined stance of an adult lord" when it came to defending a family's privileges.)

Mowbray's ancestors had been largely Midlands magnates based around Lincolnshire estates. Even his father—after he became duke of Norfolk and inherited his mother's East Anglian dower lands—was often an absentee lord. (Note: Helen Castor says of the second Duke of Norfolk, he "spent a considerable proportion of the years between 1415 and 1425 serving in France, but that on his periodic returns to England, he seems to have visited East Anglia relatively rarely, dividing his time instead between London and Epworth".) Mowbray's father was thus never able to establish a sizeable (or "particularly coherent") regional following there, and this was the situation Mowbray inherited.

== Royal service ==
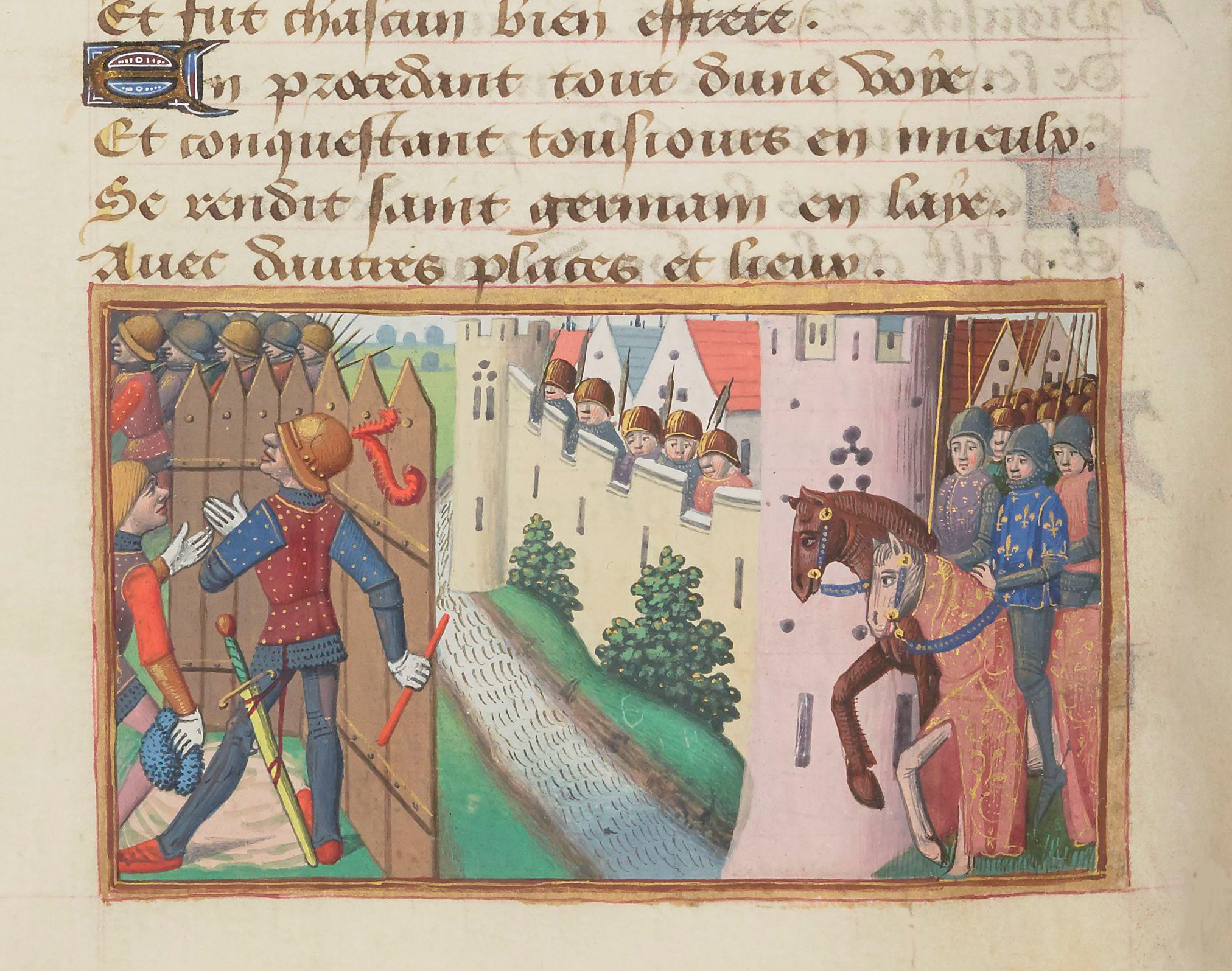
The 1436 Siege of Calais, as illustrated in Martial d'Auvergne's Vigiles du roi Charles VII

In August 1436 Mowbray accompanied the Duke of Gloucester on a campaign to relieve Calais, (Note: Calais had been an English possession since 1347. Although economically and industrially it was little different to other towns on the north-French coast, for the English its greatest advantage lay in its location as the nearest good harbour to England. Even before 1347 Edward III had spent much time attempting to build alliances with the town burghers, although unsuccessfully. Says David Grummitt, author of the most recent study of Calais as it stood in the fifteenth century, "As the last foothold of English kings on the continental mainland, Calais became the focus of the crown's military and diplomatic efforts to assert its pretensions to the French throne," and that, "despite its importance in the English wool export trade, Calais was ... above all, a 'town of war.'") then under siege by Philip the Good, Duke of Burgundy. The expedition, in which Mowbray provided a contingent, was "one of the largest English armies assembled during the fifteenth century." The campaign was a success, and Burgundy was forced to withdraw. On 13 September that year, Mowbray received livery of his inheritance, and immediately began a busy period devoted to royal service. In 1437, possibly because of Gloucester's patronage, Mowbray was appointed Warden of the Eastern March for a one-year term. He had little experience of the north of England, yet was paid wartime wages of £5,000 to campaign against the Scots.

Mowbray returned to Calais and Guînes in 1438, leading an expedition to strengthen their defences as Burgundy still presented a threat. Although he shortly after returned to England, in June 1439 he was again back in Calais, at Oye, escorting Archbishop John Kemp's diplomatic mission to the peace conference. Possibly Mowbray disapproved of royal foreign policy, which was then aimed at making peace with the French.

== Feud with William de la Pole ==
For much of the 1430s, Mowbray had problems in East Anglia, where the bulk of his estates now lay. William de la Pole become increasingly powerful, both at court and in the region, and was Mowbray's biggest rival. Mowbray had enough political clout in the 1430s to control parliamentary representation in Suffolk, but the local importance of the duke weakened his grasp. Mowbray clashed with de la Pole, and committed many illegalities doing so. These included damaging property of rivals, assaults, false allegations of outlawry (with confiscation of goods), and even murder.

For Mowbray, East Anglia as the focus of his landed authority was forced upon him since this was where the majority of his estates were located: much of his Lincolnshire inheritance was held by his mother as dower. He was then a newcomer to political society in the region, and had to share influence with others. By the time of his majority, de la Pole—with his links to central government and the King—was an established power in the region. He hindered Mowbray's attempts at regional domination for over a decade, leading to a feud that stretched from the moment Mowbray became Duke of Norfolk to the murder of de la Pole in 1450. The feud was often violent, and led to fighting between their followers. In 1435, Robert Wingfield, Mowbray's steward of Framlingham, led a group of Mowbray retainers who murdered James Andrew, one of de la Pole's men. When local aldermen attempted to arrest Wingfield's party, the latter rained arrow fire upon the aldermen, but Mowbray secured royal pardons for those responsible.

By 1440, de la Pole was a royal favourite. He instigated Mowbray's imprisonment on at least two occasions: in 1440 and in 1448. The first saw him bound over for the significant amount of £10,000, and confined to living within the royal Household, preventing him from returning to seek revenge in East Anglia. Likewise, apart from an appointment to commissions of oyer and terminer in Norwich in 1443 (after the suppression of Gladman's Insurrection), he received no other significant offices or patronage from the crown. A recent biographer of Mowbray's, the historian Colin Richmond, has described this as Mowbray's "eclipse". Richmond suggests that soon after his last imprisonment in 1449, Mowbray undertook a pilgrimage to Rome; a licence (Note: From the fourteenth century, concerned at "the potential loss of resources, in terms of men, valuables, currency and horses", the English governments tried to control pilgrimage, ("sainte vouage"). and licences to travel became mandatory.) for him to do so had been granted three years earlier.

De la Pole fought back with what one contemporary labelled "greet hevyng an shoving." He was successful in doing so. Within a couple of years, Mowbray could not protect his retainers as he had previously done. A Paston letter tells how Robert Wingfield, who was involved in a bitter dispute with one Robert Lyston, "procured and exited the wurthi prince the Duke of Norffolk to putte oute ageyn the seid Robert Lyston" from the latter's Suffolk manors. Lyston, with de la Pole's support, repeatedly sued Wingfield until in 1441 Wingfield was imprisoned in the Tower of London. In 1440, Mowbray was able to influence the Exchequer to quash Wingfield's fines; but Mowbray's success was fleeting. Mowbray was more successful in his support of John Fastolf—in one of the latter's many lawsuits (Note: John Fastolf's adversaries were always in the affinity of the Duke of Suffolk, and Fastolf spent a lot of time and more money on prosecuting them; likewise, Mowbray was "the lord to whom Fastolf usually turned" for assistance.) 1441, and was able to impose an advantageous settlement (for Fastolf) in Chancery. Generally, though, says Helen Castor, Mowbray's influence "proved woefully inadequate" to protect and defend his retainers and tenants to the degree they could reasonably expect from their lord. It was his supporters' misfortune, one historian has said, that "Norfolk's power never matched the status attributed to him". (Note: Historian Michael Hicks notes that "Bastard Feudalism existed for the mutual advantage of lords and retainers .... Bastard feudal lords were expected to support their retainers in their just causes" and that this could mean that "the lord backed his man in all his quarrels, just or not, took his side, if necessarily backed him by force and/or in the courts, and was ultimately drawn into conflict with his opponent's lord".)

Mowbray's personal and political situation did not improve over the following decade. Between 1440 and 1441 he was imprisoned in the Tower following a dispute with John Heydon, who was close to de la Pole. Mowbray was bound over on 2 July 1440 for the "enormous" sum of 10,000 marks, had to reside in the King's household, while swearing no further harm to Heydon.

=== Crime and disorder in East Anglia ===
In 1443 Mowbray and Wingfield fell out over Hoo manor. Wingfield had received Hoo from Mowbray's father, but Mowbray wanted it returned. The dispute fell into violence; R. L. Storey described Mowbray's "methods of argument" as exceptionally belligerent. According to Storey the duke "brought a force of men, with cannon and other siege engines, battered Wingfield's house at Letheringham, forced an entry, ransacked the building and removed valuables amounting to nearly £5,000."

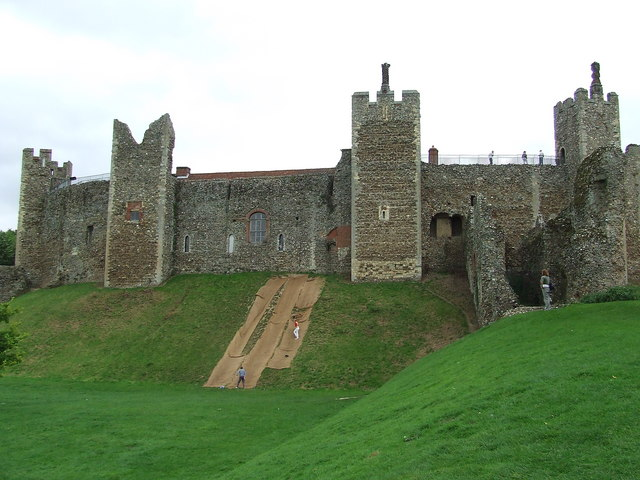
Framlingham Castle, still remarkably preserved in 2008, was Mowbray's East Anglian headquarters, from where he directed many of the attacks on his rivals and opponents.

Wingfield deserted Mowbray in light of the continuing attacks over Hoo, and offered a bounty of 500 marks for the head of a Mowbray retainer. In November 1443, Mowbray was bound over for £2,000 to keep the peace with Wingfield and instructed to appear before the royal council the following April. The council ordered them to seek arbitration. This found against Mowbray, who had to pay Wingfield 3,500 marks as compensation for the damage the duke caused to Letheringham. He also had to recompense Wingfield for Hoo before he could get it back. It was presumably as part of these proceedings that Mowbray suffered his second bout of imprisonment in the Tower, which commenced on 28 August 1444; he was released six days later.

In June 1446 Henry Howard, one of Mowbray's father's retainer, was murdered. He was visiting his sister-in-law (and Mowbray's aunt), Margaret Mowbray, (Note: The Howard family were described as "one of the wealthiest and most prestigious gentry lines in England", and Sir Robert Howard (John Howard's father) married Mowbray's aunt, Margaret some years before. Robert had long been a member of Mowbray's father's household.) at the time, as her house was only five miles (8.0 km) away. Howard's killers appear to have been retainers of John, Baron Scrope of Masham; (Note: John Scrope, 4th Baron Scrope of Masham was the brother of Henry, Lord Scrope, executed by King Henry V for his treasonable role in the Southampton Plot.) who may have actively abetted the killing. On 18 June 1446 Mowbray oversaw the presentment of an Ipswich jury to examine the murder, but the case stalled. Scrope petitioned the King on the basis that Mowbray's proceedings were "inaccurate and inherently malicious," and as a result, the King ordered that proceedings against Scrope's men cease. At least five of the thirteen jurors were Mowbray retainers. This may have been the only occasion on which Mowbray personally sat on a local King's Bench commission as the hearing J.P.

The arbitration did not resolve their feud, and in 1447 Wingfield returned to the attack. Along with another ex-Mowbray retainer, William Brandon, (Note: At some point before 1461, Brandon married Wingfield's daughter Elizabeth.) he assaulted, robbed and threatened Mowbray's staff. Mowbray—as Justice of the Peace for Suffolk—ordered him to keep the King's peace but was ignored. Wingfield was then committed to Melton gaol, but three hours later Brandon broke him out of prison. Mowbray successfully applied to Chancery for letters patent ordering Brandon and Wingfield to not come within 7 miles (11 km) of Mowbray. This order too was ignored, and they stayed at Letheringham (only five miles from Mowbray's castle at Framlingham), and started breaking into Mowbray's retainers' houses in the area. Mowbray requested that a commission of oyer and terminer be organised to investigate Wingfield and Brandon, which was issued in late December 1447.

By the early 1450s, Mowbray believed that East Anglia was his to rule, and described himself as the "princypall rewle and governance throw all this schir" (i.e. that his was the "principal rule and governance through all this shire"). In the late 1440s, John de Vere, the Earl of Oxford, another enemy of de la Pole, sought Mowbray's "good Lordship". In 1451 Mowbray and de Vere collaborated in the county of Suffolk while investigating suspected participants in Jack Cade's Rebellion, which had broken out the previous year. The region continued to experience disorder, and Mowbray's men were responsible for much of it. The unrest included the destruction of properties belonging to Alice Chaucer, Duchess of Suffolk. (Note: Granddaughter of the poet Geoffrey Chaucer, she married William de la Pole sometime between 1430 and 1432 as her third and last husband.) The Duke of Suffolk himself fell from power and was murdered in April 1450. In the following years, Mowbray's affinity, according to Richmond, committed "one outrage after another [and] the duke was either unable to control them, or chose not to do so". Mowbray used any means to defeat his opponents, including charging them with outlawry in another county without their knowledge, and then seizing their goods as forfeited to himself.

... after the dethe of Henri Howard the sessions of pees were at Gippeswiche the Saturday next after Trinity Sunday last passed there being oure right trusty and right welbeloved cousin the Duc of Norff ... at the wyche tyme the said Duc as it is said seing that he might not doo endite the said lord Scrop nor noone of his maynee for the dethe of the said Howard ....

— The National Archives, KB 145/6/25.

Mowbray also forced the gaoler of Bury St Edmunds to release a man charged with murder into Mowbray's custody. According to the gaoler's later report, he had done so but only out of "fear and terror" of the Duke of Norfolk. Mowbray spent much of the early 1450s hunting down de la Pole's affinity.

The removal of de la Pole did not advance Mowbray's power in East Anglia. He still had rivals in the region with wealth and court connections. The Earl of Oxford in particular wished to extend his landholdings from Essex into Suffolk, while Lord Scales had been granted the remnants of de la Pole's affinity by Queen Margaret. It was this lack of political connections (specifically, his exclusion from the King's council) that led to his defeat against de la Pole. Mowbray was unsuccessful in influencing local commissions and in nominating parliamentary candidates for shire elections. In any case, the county of Norfolk already possessed a strong and relatively independent layer of wealthy gentry, including the Pastons, the Howards and those around John Fastolf. They were eager to augment their positions at the expense of a neighbour, even if a lord.

== Later career and political crisis ==
During the 1450s, English politics become increasingly partisan and factional, with intermittent rises in violence and local disorder. Jack Cade's rebellion in 1450—directly aimed at royal favourites like de la Pole—explicitly named Mowbray as one of the King's "natural counsellors" necessary to reform the realm. Even so, Mowbray was part of a major royal army which eventually defeated the rebels.

The King was urged "to take about his noble person his true blood of his royal realm, that is to say, the high and mighty prince the Duke of York, exiled from our sovereign lord's person by the noising of the false traitor the Duke of Suffolk and his affinity. Also to take about him his person the mighty prince the Duke of Exeter, the Duke of Buckingham, the Duke of Norfolk ... and he shall be the richest Christian king."

— John Stowe's Historical Memoranda on Cade's rebellion.

During the next crisis—the near-rebellion of Richard of York in Autumn 1450 (Note: York felt increasingly isolated from court, even though he was the King's closest blood relation, and was, at the time, the royal heir. However, Suffolk's fall merely led to the rise of Edmund Beaufort, 2nd Duke of Somerset as the new royal favourite, further eclipsing the duke. York resorted to arms.)—Mowbray took York's side against the new royal favourite, Edmund Beaufort, Duke of Somerset. (Note: In 1443, Somerset was promoted from earl to duke and received not only an annuity but precedence over Mowbray in the peerage. In fact, although Mowbray (according to Michael Hicks) "prided himself on being royal himself", two other royal dukes were also created in the 1440s, apart from Suffolk (Exeter and Warwick).) York canvassed Mowbray for support, as he was one of the few nobles openly critical of the court. For the former, this was a logical alliance as Mowbray was as bitter an enemy of Somerset as York was. Mowbray gathered his forces at Ipswich on 8 November (having ordered John Paston to meet him there "with as many clenly people as ye may get"), and may have travelled into London with York, who had also recruited locally. (Note: York held lands in over twenty English counties, mostly in the north of England and the Welsh marches, but he held a significant swathe of manors around the Suffolk / Norfolk border.) Thus, when he arrived for the parliament it was with a large, heavily armed force. Mowbray was appointed, with the Duke of York and Earl of Devon, to maintain law and order in the City of London for the duration of the parliament, though his retinue caused as much trouble as it prevented. On 1 December, they joined with York's force and attacked Somerset's house in Blackfriars. The battle led to the beleaguered duke seeking refuge in the Tower of London in for his own protection. Two days later the King and his magnates rode through London with up to 10,000 men; Mowbray rode ahead with a force of 3,000. The display was carefully designed to quell any remnants of support for Cade's rebels.

Certayn notable knyghtis and squyers of this countee theer to have comonyngs with your good Lordshep (the earl of Oxford) for the sad rule and governaunce of this counte, (Norfolk) wych standyth ryght indisposed.

— August 1450, and Mowbray summons his men to parley with him and the Earl of Oxford at Framlingham.

Mowbray's alliance with York was intermittent. York again rebelled in 1452, confronting a royal army at Dartford when Mowbray was with the King. For his service, he received £200 and a gold cup. York may have abandoned the alliance because of his objection to Mowbray's violent behaviour in East Anglia at a time when York was presenting himself as a candidate of law and order. Mowbray's campaign against Somerset, meanwhile, continued unabated. In 1453, with the King incapacitated and York protector, Mowbray presented charges against Somerset in parliament, attacking his failure to prevent the loss of the "two so noble Duchies of Normandy and Guyenne" in France. Somerset was imprisoned in the Tower for the next year. In April 1454, Mowbray was asked to join the York's regency council, and although he swore loyalty to York's government, claimed to be too ill to attend.

The King recovered his health early in 1455 and the protectorate came to an end. Somerset was released from the Tower and as a result, according to historian Ralph Griffiths, Mowbray may have ("quite rightly" he says) feared for his own safety.

=== Wars of the Roses ===
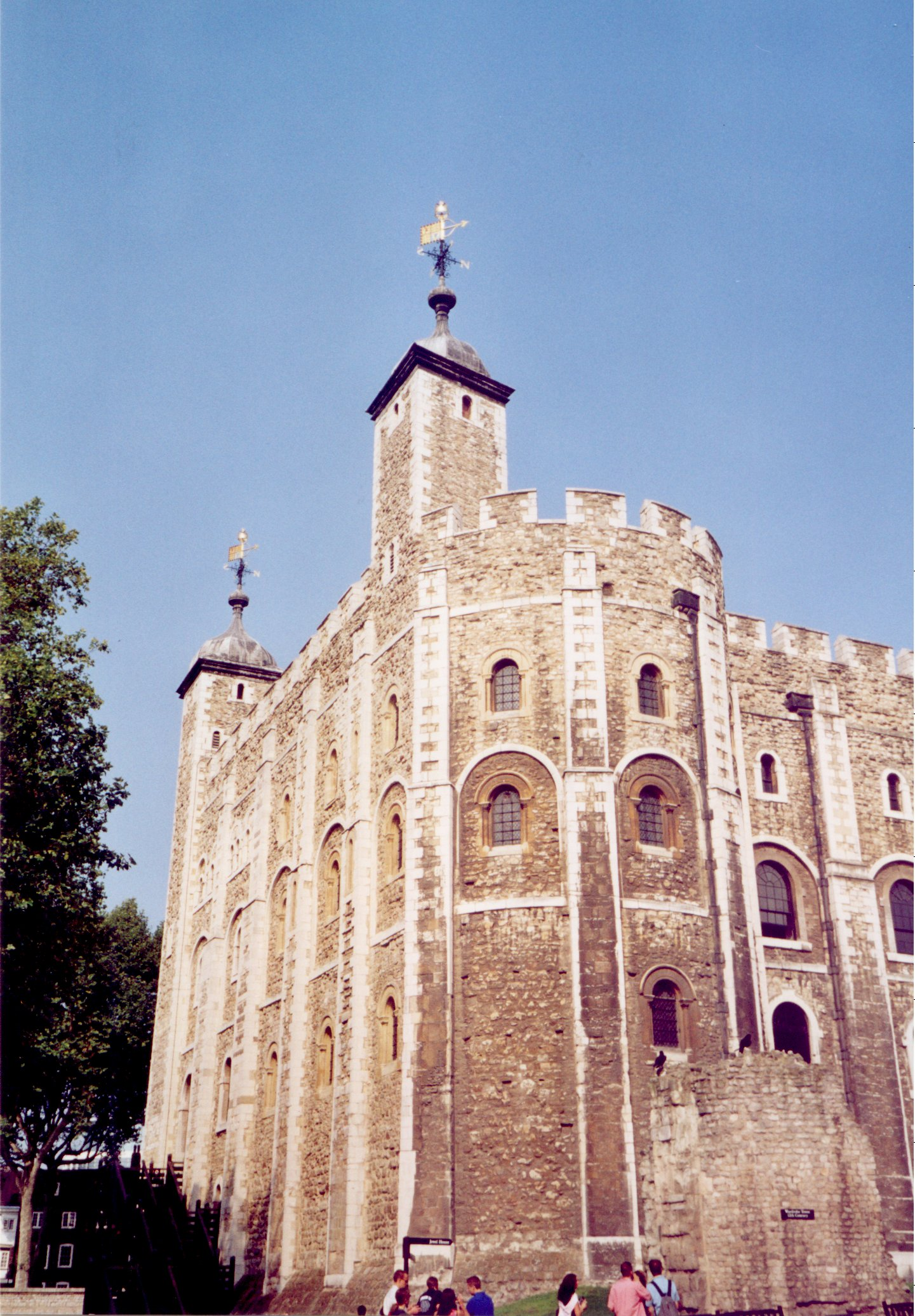
The Tower of London; both Mowbray and his arch-enemy Suffolk were imprisoned here at different stages of their careers.

Following the collapse of the 1454–55 protectorate, the Yorkist lords (Note: York had become allied with the Neville family, which consisted primarily of Mowbray's uncle, Richard Neville, 5th Earl of Salisbury, and his son, the premier earl in the land, Richard Neville, 16th Earl of Warwick. The alliance had begun sometime in the early 1450s, and had been cemented during the protectorate when York had appointed Salisbury his Lord Chancellor.) retreated to their estates, and Mowbray distanced himself from factional politics. An uneasy peace existed between the court and the Yorkists until April 1455, when the King summoned a Great Council to meet at Leicester the following month. The Duke of York feared that the purpose of this council was to destroy him; several chroniclers of the day suggest that Somerset was poisoning the King's mind against York. The duke and his Neville allies proceeded to raise an army from their northern estates. The King and a small force left London on 20 May; the Yorkists approached from the north with a speed calculated to surprise. In a pre-emptive strike, York and his allies intercepted the King at the first Battle of St Albans. Mowbray managed to avoid involvement in the fighting, even though, as Earl Marshal, his heralds were used during negotiations between the two camps. It is uncertain at what point Mowbray joined the battle, or if he even reached the King in time to take part. The fighting lasted only a short time, and though there were very few fatalities among the soldiery, Henry Percy, the 2nd Earl of Northumberland, (father of the 3rd Earl of Northumberland), the Duke of Somerset and Lord Clifford were killed. They were not only three of the King's most loyal supporters, but Percy and Somerset at least were bitter enemies of the Nevilles and York.

After the battle, Mowbray threatened to hang the Royal Standard bearer, Sir Philip Wentworth, on hearing that Wentworth "cast it down and fled" the battlefield. Whatever part, if any, Mowbray played in the fighting, by now contemporaries viewed him as being sympathetic to York. It is likely that Mowbray was deliberately vacillating. (Note: This may have been recognised by Mowbray's contemporaries, particularly those from his own area. Some fifteenth-century political verses in the archives of Holkham Hall, composed between the Battle of Towton and November 1461, describe the period of Henry VI's reign up until the 1450s, but according to Richard Beadle, omits the last years of the reign. Beadle suggests that, for the Norfolk composer of the verses, "one reason for his not wanting to remember them might be the uncertain allegiance of the Duke of Norfolk, who had at various times supported and distanced himself from the Yorkist cause.") He did not attend York's victory parliament in 1455, and might have gone on pilgrimage: he is known to have walked to Walsingham in 1456, and over the next two years may have travelled to Amiens, Rome or even Jerusalem. (Note: Although the latter may have been more unlikely due to the fact that Palestine had been lost to the Turks in the thirteenth century, and by the fifteenth was considered an "unusual activity" for English lords.)

After four years of peace, the civil war resumed in September 1459 when the Yorkist Earl of Salisbury fought off a royal ambush at the Battle of Blore Heath. Salisbury won that battle but was defeated soon after with the Duke of York at the Battle of Ludford. The Yorkists escaped into exile. Mowbray had taken neither side, but with the Yorkists exiled, when a parliament was called at Coventry, Mowbray attended. Here the Yorkists were attainted, and on 11 December 1459 Mowbray took an oath of loyalty to keep Henry VI on the throne. (Note: Charles Ross notes that this was in spite of his family relationship with York. His cousins also attended the Coventry parliament and likewise took the oath to Henry VI.) He received several royal commissions in the final months of Lancastrian rule.

The Nevilles and Earl of March spent their exile in Calais, while York and his other son, Edmund, Earl of Rutland, retired to Dublin. The Nevilles returned to England in June 1460. They were admitted into London, where they could plan an assault on the King's army, then based in Northampton. On 10 July the Yorkist army under Warwick and March defeated the royalist army at the Battle of Northampton, and once again the King was captured. Colin Richmond describes Mowbray as "more likely to have observed from a safe distance than participated" in it.

York returned from exile in October 1460, and much to the frustration of his allies, made claim to the throne. Mowbray's reaction is uncertain as the chroniclers omit mention of him, but some historians note how Mowbray sided with them during the Yorkists' return from exile. The exact cause of his change of loyalty is unknown. Colin Richmond argues that the Lancastrian defeat at Northampton in June 1460 was fundamental, and Mowbray lost friends and colleagues. It is possible that King Henry's capture there encouraged him to desert the King. Christine Carpenter puts it down almost solely to Mowbray's failure to improve his position in Norfolk under Henry, while Castor points to the October 1460 Yorkist parliament being the turning point for Mowbray: possibly he believed that the attempted settlement contained in the Act of Accord was the best possible outcome.

The King and Queen still had the support of much of the nobility and withdrew to the north to commence a campaign of ravaging York and the Nevilles' estates. This forced York, Salisbury and Rutland, to move north on 9 December to suppress the Lancastrians. Mowbray remained in London with Salisbury's and York's sons, the Earls of Warwick and March. York and Salisbury's expedition ended in disaster. Choosing to engage a Lancastrian army outside the duke's castle at Sandal, the Yorkists were crushed at the Battle of Wakefield on 30 December. York, Rutland and Salisbury, died in or soon after the battle. The Queen's army made its way south towards London. Mowbray, Warwick and his brother John Neville, Lord Montagu, marched north to intercept the approaching Lancastrians. Mowbray brought King Henry with them. The armies clashed on 17 February 1461 outside St Albans, where the Yorkists were defeated. Mowbray and Warwick abandoned the King to his wife and her supporters, and retreated to London before the victorious Lancastrian army could reach the city.

=== Battle of Towton ===
Yorkist and Lancastrian positions at the Battle of Towton, showing the attack of Norfolk's force on the Lancastrian flank.

The Lancastrian army marched on London, but were refused entry. On 3 March 1461 Mowbray attended a great council at Baynard's Castle, organised a small group of Yorkist loyalists, and agreed to offer Edward, Earl of March the throne. The following day—indicating the urgency for resolution felt by the Yorkists by this stage—Mowbray was sent to East Anglia to "prepare for the war on the party of King Edward". The Lancastrian army had returned to the north where, on 29 March 1461, York and Lancaster met at the Battle of Towton. It was to be one of the longest and bloodiest battles fought on British soil, and "fought in bitter Yorkshire weather and no less bitter spirit", according to historian Charles Ross. On Mowbray's advice, Edward followed the Lancastrian army north with a new army.

Mowbray seems to have recruited successfully; one of the Paston letters mentions that "every town hath waged and sent forth." Mowbray left East Anglia via Cambridge on 17 March 1461, where he joined forces with Sir John Howard, his cousin and retainer. Mowbray's army may have constituted elements of the Yorkist rearguard, as such not part of the main army, and were intending to join with it later. He was still not with Warwick's and March's council of war at Doncaster in late March. There are different explanations for the delay. He may have faced difficulty in mustering troops; the army recently raised to fight at St Alban's had been dispersed and this would require re-mustering. It is likely that—since he died only a few months later—Mowbray was too ill to keep up with the main Yorkist force.

At Pontefract Mowbray transferred command to Howard, knowing that time was of the essence for the Yorkists and while he was with them, his soldiers could only march as quickly as he could. If Mowbray was ill, then it is unlikely that he fought personally; Boardman observed that "a sick man would never have survived such a strength-sapping ordeal, especially a noble in armour-plate." If his contingent was tasked with bringing up Yorkist artillery, which would have further slowed them down and they may have abandoned armoury en route to increase their speed. (Note: Andrew Boardman considers it "impossible" that Edward would not have gathered artillery while in London, however, subsequent archaeological excavation has not uncovered any sign at all of their presence on the battlefield.)

Mowbray arrived late but at a crucial point of the battle. His prolonged absence after a day's bitter fighting must have been a worry for the Yorkists, especially as they may have thought him up to a day's march away. Mowbray's absence presented an acute problem for them; Philip A. Haigh describes them, by four o'clock in the afternoon, as doomed without him. There must have been much messaging between Edward and Mowbray throughout the day, but battle fatigue had almost certainly set in on both sides by the time Mowbray's troops arrived on the eastern edge of the battlefield. A contemporary chronicler described the situation thus

So did The White Lion [Mowbray] full worthily he wrought, Almighty Jesus bless his soul, that their armies taught. Blessed be the time, that God ever spread that flower!

— The Rose of Rouen, c. 1461

And about four o'clock at night [i.e., 4 am] the two battles joined and fought all night till on the morrow in the afternoon. About noon the aforesaid John, Duke of Norfolk, with a fresh band of good men of war came to the aid of the newly elected King Edward ....

— The Hearne fragment, Thomas Hearne's Thomae Sprotti Chronica

Mowbray launched a decisive attack on the Lancastrian flank, turning them left. His arrival both reinvigorated the Yorkist army and crushed Lancastrian morale with his surprise attack and led rapidly to a Lancastrian rout to give the victory to Edward IV.

== Under the Yorkists ==
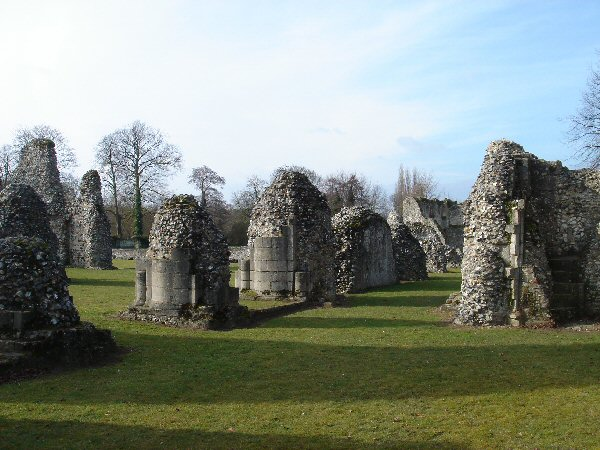
The ruins of Thetford Priory, Norfolk, in 2006, where John Mowbray was buried.

The Earl Marshals played an important role in coronations. Like his predecessors, as Earl Marshal Mowbray officiated the coronation of Edward IV on 28 June 1461. Within two months he received several lucrative offices. Public order was a problem from the beginning of the King's reign, and East Anglia was no exception. Mobs rampaged during that year's parliamentary elections. Norfolk may have encouraged this; he is certainly a candidate for ordering the murder of coroner Thomas Denys that August.

Even though Mowbray supported the Yorkist regime, he met with strong opposition from the East Anglian gentry in the first year of the reign. This was despite the support of the King, and the backing of John Howard in the shires. (Note: The Howard family at this time has been described by one modern historian as "one of the wealthiest and most prestigious gentry lines in England", and Sir Robert Howard (John Howard's father) had married Mowbray's aunt, Margaret some years before. Robert had long been a member of Mowbray's father's household.) Howard was by now one of Mowbray's senior retainers—described as Mowbray's "right well-beloved cousin and servant"—and Sheriff of Norfolk. By November, however, he had been arrested by the new Yorkist regime.

=== Death ===
Mowbray did not live long enough to benefit from the Yorkist victory. He died on 6 November 1461, aged 45, and was buried at Thetford Priory. He was succeeded by his only son, John. His mother, Katherine Duchess of Norfolk lived until 1483. She had already taken two more husbands during Mowbray's lifetime, and, after Mowbray's death, took a fourth husband, the much younger John Woodville, a younger brother of Queen Elizabeth Woodville. (Note: She outlived all her Mowbray descendants, and as a result, no Mowbray duke of Norfolk received his full inheritance.)

== Marriage and issue ==
Mowbray married Eleanor Bourchier, daughter of William Bourchier, Count of Eu, and Anne of Gloucester, Countess of Buckingham. Eleanor was the sister of his successor as Justice in Eyre, Henry Bourchier. The couple appears to have shared a close bond: while travelling in 1451, Mowbray supposedly dispensed with his retinue to enjoy, according to Colin Richmond, "a private tryst" with his wife. The couple had one child, also John, who in 1448 married Elizabeth, daughter of John Talbot, Earl of Shrewsbury. The son was seventeen when his father died in 1461, and inherited the estate four years later.

== Character and legacy ==
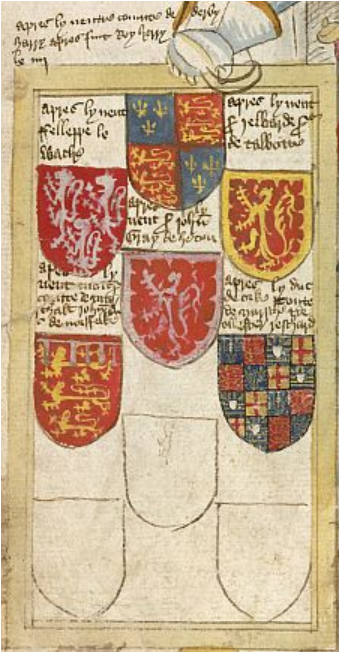
Page from the Bruges Garter Book with Mowbray's arms at centre left: Gules, three lions passant gardant or, in chief a label of three points argent.

Ralph Griffiths has suggested that when Archbishop John Kemp died in 1453, it may have been in part because of the bullying and threats he had been subjected to, most "notably by Norfolk himself". One modern historian has attributed much of Suffolk's success in the region, which antagonised Mowbray, to Mowbray's "crass incompetence" and that he was "ineffectual" in assisting those who expected to rely on the protection of a lord of his stature. J. R. Lander described Mowbray as a "disreputable thug", while Richmond concludes that he was "cavalier with the rights of others to a safe life and a secure livelihood". Richmond writes that while "many medieval aristocrats were irresponsible men ... Mowbray's individuality lay in the thoroughness of his irresponsibility." In contrast, Michael Hicks believes that honour was clearly important to Mowbray, as his pursuit of Somerset (for that duke's abject performance in France) shows. Likewise, as Earl Marshal, he must have possessed a firm understanding of chivalry and its application, as it was fundamental to the office.

== Cultural depictions ==
Mowbray, as "Duke of Norfolk", is a minor figure in the play King Henry VI, Part 3 by William Shakespeare. (Note: Mowbray's grandfather Thomas, 1st Duke of Norfolk, also appears in Shakespeare's Richard II, but is a far more pivotal character with a much greater role.) He appears in act I, scene I, and act II, scene II as a supporter of the Duke of York; the first time just after the Battle of St Albans, and is portrayed "conspicuously associated with opposition." This is ahistorical, as Mowbray was still loyal to King Henry at this point. His second appearance in the play is at the Battle of Towton. The play has been adapted for the screen several times. In the 1960 BBC TV serial An Age of Kings, the character appears in the episode "Henry VI: The Morning's War" portrayed by Jeffry Wickham. In 1965 the BBC again adapted the history plays for television, this time based on the 1963 theatre production The Wars of the Roses. Mowbray appears in the episode "Edward IV" portrayed by David Hargreaves.

In the Elizabethan play The Merry Devil of Edmonton, Mowbray does not appear as a character on stage, but the comical figure Blague repeatedly claims that: "I serve the good Duke of Norfolk." Exactly what period the play is set is the subject debate among scholars. Suggestions range from the reign of King Henry VI (1421–1471) to the 1580s (in Queen Elizabeth I's reign). The 20th-century Shakespeare scholar W. W. Greg places it in the reign of Henry VI, basing his conclusion in part on Thomas Fuller's posthumously published History of the Worthies of England (1662). If this is the case then the "Duke of Norfolk" referred to in the play would be Mowbray. According to J. M. Bromley, the play evokes "the similarities between poaching and treason", and the anonymous author deliberately links this Duke of Norfolk to both. Rudolph Fiehler noted how Blague's service to the duke was very much based upon the unsavoury characteristics of "cowardice, poaching and thievery". It has further been suggested that his comic catchphrase was deliberately intended to invoke Sir John Falstaff, one of Shakespeare's best-known characters, for the audience. In Shakespeare's Henry IV, Part 2, Justice Shallow refers to Falstaff as having once been a page to "Thomas Mowbray, Duke of Norfolk", Mowbray's grandfather. Falstaff is commonly considered to be a fictional representation of either Sir John Oldcastle or Sir John Fastolf—or possibly an amalgamation of the two—both of whom are variously associated with Mowbray.

== Notes ==
Political offices
Preceded by The Duke of Norfolk	Earl Marshal; 1432–1461	Succeeded by The Duke of Norfolk
Preceded by The Earl of Northumberland	Warden of the Eastern March; 1437	Succeeded by Sir Robert Ogle
Preceded by The Earl of Northumberland	Warden of the Eastern March; 1437	Succeeded by Sir Ralph Grey
Legal offices
Preceded by The Earl of Arundel	Justice in Eyre south of the Trent; 1461	Succeeded by The Earl of Essex
Peerage of England
Preceded by John Mowbray	Duke of Norfolk; 1432–1461	Succeeded by John Mowbray
