= Cecily Neville, Duchess of York =

English noblewoman (1415–1495)

Cecily Neville
- Duchess of York
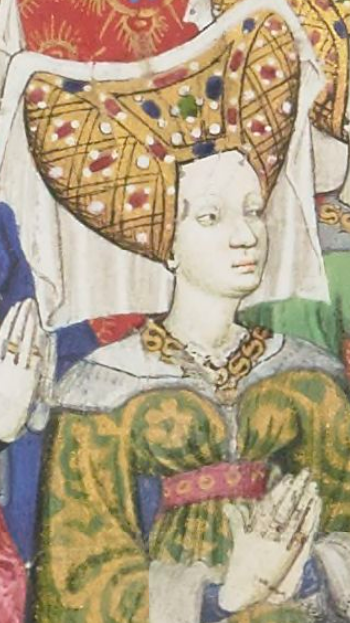
- Image of Cecily Neville in the Neville Hours (before 1440)
- Born: 3 May 1415; Raby Castle, Durham, England
- Died: 31 May 1495 (aged 80); Berkhamsted Castle, Hertfordshire, England
- Burial: Church of St Mary and All Saints, Fotheringhay
- Spouse: Richard, 3rd Duke of York (m. in or before 1429; died 1460)
- Issue more...: Anne, Duchess of Exeter; Edward IV of England; Edmund, Earl of Rutland; Elizabeth, Duchess of Suffolk; Margaret, Duchess of Burgundy; George, Duke of Clarence; Richard III of England
- House: Neville
- Father: Ralph Neville, 1st Earl of Westmorland
- Mother: Joan Beaufort

Cecily Neville (3 May 1415 – 31 May 1495) was an English noblewoman, the wife of Richard, Duke of York (1411–1460), and the mother of two Kings of England—Edward IV and Richard III. She was born at Raby Castle in Durham, and was known for her piety. Although she has been long known as "The Rose of Raby", this sobriquet has no historical basis, since its first mention is found in a late 18th century novel by Agnes Musgrave. She herself signed her name "Cecylle".

Cecily's husband, the Duke of York, was the leading contender for the throne of England from the House of York during the period of the Wars of the Roses until his death in 1460. Their son Edward actually assumed the throne as Edward IV in 1461, after the deposition of King Henry VI of the House of Lancaster. The Duchess of York thus narrowly missed becoming queen consort of England. Through Edward's daughter, Elizabeth of York, Cecily was the great-grandmother of Henry VIII and an ancestor of all subsequent English and British monarchs.

== Family ==
Cecily Neville was the youngest of the 22 children of Ralph Neville, 1st Earl of Westmorland, by his second wife Joan Beaufort. Her paternal grandparents were John Neville, 3rd Baron Neville de Raby, and Maud Percy, daughter of Henry de Percy, 2nd Baron Percy. Her maternal grandparents were John of Gaunt, 1st Duke of Lancaster, and his third wife Katherine Swynford. John of Gaunt was the third surviving son of King Edward III of England and Philippa of Hainault.

Cecily was the aunt of Richard Neville, 16th Earl of Warwick, one of the leading peers and military commanders of his generation, a great-aunt of queen consort Anne Neville, who married her son Richard III, and a great-great-great-aunt of queen consort Catherine Parr, sixth wife of her great-grandson, King Henry VIII.

== Duchess of York ==
In 1424, when Cecily was eight years old, she was betrothed by her father to his thirteen-year-old ward and her second cousin, Richard Plantagenet, 3rd Duke of York. Marriage between noble wards and their guardian's children was very common practice in late Medieval England.

Ralph Neville died in October 1425, bequeathing the wardship of Richard to his widow, Joan Beaufort. Cecily and Richard were married by October 1429. Their first child, Anne of York, was born in August 1439 in Northamptonshire. When Richard became a king's lieutenant and governor general of France in 1441 and moved to Rouen, Cecily moved with him. Their son Henry was born in February but died soon after.

Their next son, the future King Edward IV, was born in Rouen on 28 April 1442 and immediately baptised privately in a small side chapel. He would later be accused of illegitimacy by his cousin, Richard Neville, 16th Earl of Warwick, and by his own brother, George, Duke of Clarence, a common method of discrediting political enemies. George and Warwick were in dispute with Edward at the time and seeking to overthrow him as king. The claims would later be dismissed. Nonetheless, some modern historians give serious consideration to the question, and use Edward's date of birth as supporting evidence: assuming Edward was not premature (there being no evidence either way), Richard of York would have been several days' march from Cecily at the time of conception and the baby's baptism was a simple and private affair, unlike that of his younger brother Edmund, Earl of Rutland, which was public and lavish. This is countered by other historians, however, who point out that Cecily's husband could easily, by the military conventions of the time, have returned briefly to Rouen, where Cecily was living at the time, while baptism conventions of the time meant that a low-key baptism would be more likely due to Richard of York's relatively low political standing at the time and fears for the baby's survival. If the difference in baptisms was to be taken as a disavowal of an otherwise acknowledged and cherished heir, it would not only be a humiliation of a wife Richard otherwise valued before and after Edward's birth, but also a personal and political humiliation. In any case, Richard acknowledged the baby as his own, which established legal paternity.

Around 1454, when Richard began to resent the influence of Edmund Beaufort, 2nd Duke of Somerset (a first cousin of his wife), Cecily spoke with queen consort Margaret of Anjou on his behalf. When Henry VI suffered a nervous breakdown later in the year, Richard of York established himself as a Protector.

After the outbreak of the Wars of the Roses in 1455, Cecily remained at their home, Ludlow Castle, even after Richard fled to Ireland and Continental Europe. At the same time, she surreptitiously worked for the cause of the House of York. When a parliament began to debate the fate of the Duke of York and his supporters in November 1459, Cecily travelled to London to plead for her husband. One contemporary commentator stated that she had reputedly convinced the king to promise a pardon if the duke would appear in the parliament in eight days. This effort failed, and Richard's lands were confiscated, but Cecily managed to gain an annual grant of £600 to support herself and her children.

After the Yorkist victory at the Battle of Northampton in July 1460, Cecily moved to London with her children and lived with the lawyer John Paston. She carried the royal arms before Richard in triumph in London in September. When the Duke of York and his heirs were officially recognised as Henry VI's successors in the Act of Accord, Cecily became a queen-in-waiting and even received a copy of the English chronicle from the chronicler John Hardyng.

But in the Battle of Wakefield on 30 December 1460, the Lancastrians won a decisive victory. The Duke of York, his second son Edmund, Earl of Rutland, and Cecily's brother Richard Neville, Earl of Salisbury, were among the casualties. Cecily sent her two youngest sons, George and Richard, to the court of Philip III, Duke of Burgundy. This forced Philip to ally with the Yorkists.

== Mother of two kings, great-aunt of a queen, and grandmother of a queen ==
Cecily's eldest son Edward successfully continued the fight against the Lancastrians. When Cecily moved to Baynard's Castle in London, it became the Yorkist headquarters, and after Edward defeated the Lancastrians at the Battle of Towton and ascended the throne, she was honoured as the mother of the king.

During the beginning of Edward's reign, Cecily appeared beside him and maintained her influence. In 1461, she revised her coat of arms to include the royal arms of England, hinting that her husband had been a rightful king. When Edward married Elizabeth Woodville in 1464, he built new queen's quarters for and let his mother remain in the older queen's quarters in which she had been living.

In 1469, her nephew Richard Neville, 16th Earl of Warwick, father-in-law of her sons George and later Richard, rebelled against Edward IV. She visited Sandwich, possibly trying to reconcile the parties. When the rebellion failed the first time, she invited Edward and George to London to reconcile them. Peace did not last long, and in the forthcoming war, she still tried to make peace between her sons.

Edward IV was briefly overthrown by Warwick and Margaret of Anjou, and for about six months (October 1470 – April 1471), Henry VI was restored to the throne. The breach between Edward and his brother George was apparently never really healed; indeed, George was executed for treason in the Tower of London on 18 February 1478. Edward IV died suddenly on 9 April 1483, leaving two sons aged 12 and 9, the elder one known to history as King Edward V. Cecily Neville's youngest son Richard, their uncle, was appointed their protector by Edward's will, but he had them placed in the Tower of London, as it was custom for Kings awaiting their coronation; their fate is still a matter of dispute. A subsequent enquiry found that Edward IV's marriage to Elizabeth Woodville had been invalid. The so-called Princes in the Tower were thus declared illegitimate by Act of Parliament in 1484 and their uncle Richard crowned Richard III on 6 July 1483.

Duchess Cecily was on good terms with Richard's wife Lady Anne Neville (her grandniece in addition to being her daughter-in-law), with whom she discussed religious works such as the writings of Mechtilde of Hackeborn.

Richard's reign was brief; he was defeated and killed on 22 August 1485 at the Battle of Bosworth by the leader of the Lancastrian party, Henry Tudor, who immediately assumed the throne as King Henry VII. Thus Cecily's husband and four sons had all died by 1485, although two of her daughters, Elizabeth and Margaret, still lived. On 18 January 1486, Cecily's granddaughter, Elizabeth of York, eldest daughter of Edward IV, married Henry VII and became Queen of England. Her great-grandson Arthur was born that same year, whereas her great-granddaughter Margaret was born in 1489 and great-grandson Henry in 1491, all before she died. Duchess Cecily devoted herself to religious duties and her reputation for piety comes from this period.

== Death and will ==
The Duchess died on 31 May 1495 and was buried in the tomb with her husband Richard and their son Edmund at the Church of St Mary and All Saints, Fotheringhay, Northamptonshire, with a papal indulgence. All subsequent English and later British monarchs, beginning with Henry VIII, are descendants of Elizabeth of York, and therefore of Cecily Neville.

"Cecill wife unto the right noble Prince Richard late Duke of Yorke" made her will on 1 April 1495. It was proved at the Prerogative Court of Canterbury on 27 August of the same year.

== Issue ==
Her twelve children with Richard Plantagenet, 3rd Duke of York, were as follows:

1. Anne of York (10 August 1439 – 14 January 1476), married firstly, Henry Holland, 3rd Duke of Exeter, and secondly, Sir Thomas St. Leger
2. Henry of York (10 February 1441 – 10 February 1441), died soon after birth
3. Edward IV of England (28 April 1442 – 9 April 1483)
4. Edmund, Earl of Rutland (17 May 1443 – 30 December 1460), killed at the Battle of Wakefield
5. Elizabeth of York (22 April 1444 – possibly after January 1503), wife of John de la Pole, 2nd Duke of Suffolk
6. Margaret of York (3 May 1446 – 23 November 1503), married Charles I, Duke of Burgundy
7. William of York (7 July 1447 – died young)
8. John of York (7 November 1448 – died young)
9. George Plantagenet, 1st Duke of Clarence (21 October 1449 – 18 February 1478), executed by Edward IV
10. Thomas of York (1450/1451 – died young)
11. Richard III of England (2 October 1452 – 22 August 1485), killed at the Battle of Bosworth Field
12. Ursula of York (22 July 1455 – died young)

== Coat of arms ==
Coat of arms of Cecily Neville, Duchess of York
Notes Richard of York became the 3rd Duke of York in 1432. As the wife of the Duke of York, Cecily bore the arms of her husband impaled with those of her father, the Earl of Westmorland (Neville). Adopted 12 May 1432 Escutcheon Quarterly, 1st and 4th, France modern, 2nd and 3rd England, with a label of three points Argent each point charged with three torteaux Gules; impaled by Gules a saltire Argent (Neville). Supporters Sinister chained Stag/Hart argent, Dexter white Lion rampant gardant (like that which her son, Edward IV, adopted as Earl of March); surmounted by a chained falcon badge. Symbolism As the daughter of Ralph Neville, 1st Earl of Westmorland, Cecily inherited Westmorland's arms which were impaled with that of the Duke of York's. The Duke of York inherited the associated arms of his grandfather, Edmund of Langley, son of King Edward III; Quarterly, 1st and 4th, France modern, 2nd and 3rd England, with a label of three points Argent each point charged with three torteaux Gules. In 1461, Cecily changed her arms to include the Royal coat of arms of England to imply that her late husband had been the rightful king.

== Ancestry ==
Ancestors of Cecily Neville, Duchess of York

8. Ralph Neville, 2nd Baron Neville
4. John Neville, 3rd Baron Neville
9. Alice Audley
2. Ralph Neville, 1st Earl of Westmorland
10. Henry Percy, 2nd Baron Percy
5. Maud Percy
11. Idonea Clifford
1. Cecily Neville, Duchess of York
12. Edward III of England
6. John of Gaunt, 1st Duke of Lancaster
13. Philippa of Hainault
3. Joan Beaufort
14. Sir Payne de Roet
7. Katherine Swynford
