= 2nd Duke of Norfolk =

2nd Duke of Norfolk may refer to:

- John Mowbray, 2nd Duke of Norfolk, from the first creation
- Thomas Howard, 2nd Duke of Norfolk, from the third creation

== See also ==
- Duke of Norfolk
