= Catherine Strangeways =

Catherine Strangeways may refer to:

- Lady Katherine Neville, married name Catherine Strangeways
- Lady Catherine Gordon, married name Catherine Strangeways
