= William Neville, Earl of Kent =

15th-century English nobleman and soldier

William Neville
- Earl of Kent
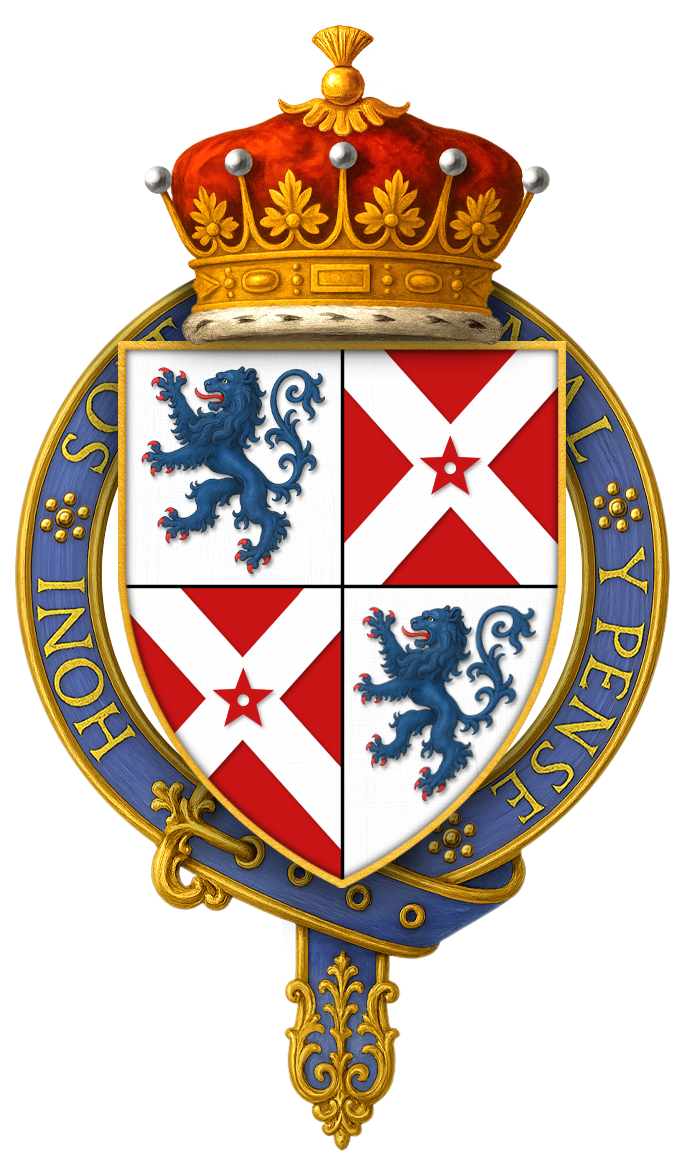
- Arms of William Neville, Earl of Kent, KG
- Born: c. 1405
- Died: 9 January 1463 (aged 57–58)
- Noble family: Neville
- Spouse: Joan de Fauconberg, suo jure 6th Baroness Fauconberg
- Issue: Lady Alice Neville; Lady Elizabeth Neville; Lady Joan Neville; Thomas Neville, the Bastard of Fauconberg (illegitimate)
- Father: Ralph Neville, 1st Earl of Westmorland
- Mother: Joan Beaufort

William Neville, Earl of Kent, KG (c. 1405 – 9 January 1463), jure uxoris 6th Baron Fauconberg, was an English nobleman and soldier.

Originally a Lancastrian who served under Henry VI, he later joined the Yorkist cause and became one of Edward IV's most trusted commanders. A veteran of the later Anglo-French wars, he was highly regarded by contemporaries for his military skill; Edward relied heavily on him during the Wars of the Roses. He demonstrated this in a wide range of roles, particularly at the Battle of Towton.

== Early life ==
Born circa 1405, he was the third son of Ralph Neville, 1st Earl of Westmorland, and his second wife, Joan Beaufort.

His mother was the legitimised daughter of John of Gaunt, 1st Duke of Lancaster, and Katherine Swynford. John of Gaunt was the third surviving son of King Edward III of England and Philippa of Hainault. William was therefore a great-grandson of Edward III. However, the terms of the legitimisation of the Beaufort family specifically excluded them and their descendants from succession to the throne.

William was one of a number of the Neville sons to make a good match, marrying the Fauconberg heiress, Joan de Fauconberg, 6th Baroness Fauconberg suo jure, daughter of Thomas de Fauconberg, 5th Baron Fauconberg by his second wife, Joan Brounflete (died 1409), and taking the title Lord Fauconberg; just as his nephew, Richard Neville, married the Warwick heiress and became Earl of Warwick. William's marriage took place at some point before 1422. His wife was four years older than he and was described as an idiot from birth. The Fauconberg estates were in North Yorkshire, a centre of power for other members of the Neville family.

== Loyalty to the Crown ==
He seemingly had a conventional military career during the earlier part of Henry VI's reign. Knighted in May 1426, he was serving on the Scottish Borders in 1435. In 1436, he was serving with his brother-in-law Richard, Duke of York, in France—his first contact with a man who was later to receive his allegiance. By 1439, he was a field commander in France, with Lords Talbot and Scales. At the siege of Harfleur in 1440, he was made a Knight of the Garter for his part in the campaigns of 1438–39, in particular the capture and garrisoning of Meaux.

The town where Henry V had died was a crucial marches town for English Normandy. They had re-supplied the town, also retaking Montargis and Gerberoy. Fauconberg fought with the relief at Meaux when Richemont seized the stronghold by storm on 12 August 1439. The English lords forced a confrontation, but the French fled, leaving twenty barges laden with supplies.

As one of the three field commanders, Neville had been put on the royal council since 30 April, on Warwick's death, before a new regent could emerge. In October, Fauconberg helped recapture Harfleur, expelling the French garrison; only Dieppe remained intransigent. The field commander's pre-eminence was supplanted in March 1442 by the appointment of William, Lord Bourgchier, as governor-general of Normandy.

On 7 March 1443, after his return to England, he took custody of Roxburgh Castle in Scotland. He was granted £1,000 per annum (around £1,000,000 at 2005 prices) during peacetime, twice this if at war with Scotland, and until 1448, satisfactory payment was made. However, in 1449, he returned to France as part of a diplomatic mission, and in May 1449 he spent the night that the French chose to capture Pont de l'Arche in Normandy. One hundred and twenty men were taken in all.

Neville was reluctant to surrender to a lowly archer, who almost killed him. While in captivity in France, he spent two years of his own income supporting the upkeep of the castle. In spite of a grant from Parliament in 1449, by 1451 he was owed £4,109. He was forced to settle for less. The loss of such an experienced captain was a blow to English administration. The English had already lost the Bretons for taking their salt fleet, and then in July 1449, Somerset refused Fauconberg's return in a deal for Fougeres.

In 1453, he was ransomed (for 8,000 French ecus) and freed from captivity. He still had the custody of Roxburgh Castle, but was impoverished by maintaining this and by his captivity in France. By now, he was owed £1,000 by the government. He settled this by accepting a grant of 1,000 marks from the customs at Newcastle. Not only was this only worth about two-thirds of the original amount, there was no guarantee that he would ever get the money. Griffths says, "What is so remarkable about his tale is that the Lancastrian crown could command [his] loyalty".

== Alliance with York ==
Until this point, he can be seen as a loyal supporter of the House of Lancaster. However, at some time during the next two years, his allegiance began to shift. He was a member of the council of Richard, Duke of York, during Henry VI's second period of madness. Although he was with the Lancastrian nobility at the First Battle of St Albans (1455), he was appointed by York to be joint Constable of Windsor Castle after the battle. His alignment with York, who was his brother-in-law, was natural, as his brother, the Earl of Salisbury and his nephew the Earl of Warwick (the "Kingmaker") were Richard's principal allies.

In 1457, he joined Warwick (appointed Captain of Calais) as his deputy. Warwick used Calais as a base for what was essentially piracy, and Fauconberg seems to have been happy to assist. He was in England in 1458, and in May he was briefly imprisoned in London—but he was bailed by Warwick and returned to Calais.

== Awards and appointments ==
The rewards of victory followed. He was made a member of the King's Council and appointed Lieutenant of the North. On 1 November, he was created Earl of Kent and appointed Steward of the Royal Household. In July 1462, he was appointed Lord High Admiral, and in August that year he was granted 46 manors in the West Country.

Edward IV relied on him for both land and naval warfare. Following the victory at Towton, he took part in the gradual establishment of royal control in Northumberland, heading a garrison of 120 men at Newcastle in the summer of 1461, and taking part in the siege of Alnwick in November 1462. Between these dates, he was back in Calais, raiding the Breton coast in August 1462, then burning Le Conquet near Brest, and raiding the Île de Ré,.

He died on 9 January 1463, and was buried at Gisborough Priory in the heart of his Fauconberg lands. As he had no surviving legitimate sons, the earldom became extinct. He was survived by his wife, who died in 1490 at the age of 84 (thus living through the reigns of all the English kings of the fifteenth century). He had three daughters and one son from his marriage, and one acknowledged illegitimate son, Thomas Neville. Known as the Bastard of Fauconberg, he was to align himself with Warwick and lead a revolt later in Edward IV's reign.

William Neville is an underrated figure in the rise to power of the Yorkist regime. More successful as a military leader than the more famous Richard Neville, 16th Earl of Warwick, his reputation is summed up in Goodman's words: "No other veteran of the Anglo-French Wars won such distinction in the Wars of the Roses".

== Ancestry ==
Ancestors of William Neville, Earl of Kent

16. Ralph Neville, 1st Baron Neville de Raby
8. Ralph Neville, 2nd Baron Neville de Raby
17. Euphemia de Clavering
4. John Neville, 3rd Baron Neville de Raby
18. Hugh de Audley, 1st Baron Audley of Stratton Audley
9. Alice Audley
19. Iseude Mortimer
2. Ralph de Neville, 1st Earl of Westmorland
20. Henry de Percy, 1st Baron Percy
10. Henry de Percy, 2nd Baron Percy
21. Eleanor Fitzalan
5. Maud Percy
22. Robert Clifford, 1st Baron Clifford
11. Idoine de Clifford
23. Maud de Clare
1. William Neville, Earl of Kent
24. Edward II of England
12. Edward III, King of England
25. Isabella of France
6. John of Gaunt, 1st Duke of Lancaster
26. William I, Count of Hainault
13. Philippa of Hainault
27. Joan of Valois
3. Joan Beaufort
14. Sir Payne de Roet
7. Katherine Swynford

== Sources ==
=== Books ===
- Goodman, Anthony (19 July 1990) [1981]. "Local Revolts and Nobles' Struggles, 1469–71". The Wars of the Roses: Military Activity and English Society, 1452–97. London, United Kingdom: Routledge. pp. 66–85. ISBN 978-0-415-05264-1.

== Bibliography ==
- Barker, J. Conquest: The English Kingdom of France 1417–1450, Little, Brown, 2009. ISBN 978-1-4087-0083-9
- Hicks, J. Warwick the Kingmaker ISBN 0-631-23593-0
- Ross, Charles Edward IV ISBN 0-413-54100-2
- Goodman, J. Wars of the Roses ISBN 0-7100-0728-0
- Kendall, M. J. Warwick the Kingmaker ISBN 1-84212-575-3
- Griffiths, R. J. Henry VI ISBN 0-7509-3777-7
- Gillingham, J. Wars of the Roses ISBN 1-84212-274-6
- Wolffe, B. Henry VI ISBN 0-300-08926-0
- Storey, R. L. End of the House of Lancaster ISBN 0-86299-290-7
- Johnson Richard Duke of York ISBN 0-19-820268-7

Peerage of England
New creation	Earl of Kent; 1461-1463	Vacant Title next held by Edmund Grey
Preceded by Thomas de Fauconberg	Baron Fauconberg (jure uxoris by Joan Fauconberg); 1429-1463	Succeeded by Joan Fauconberg as sole baroness
Military offices
Preceded by The Duke of Exeter	Lord High Admiral; 1462-1463	Succeeded by The Duke of Gloucester
