= Neville Hours =

Medieval prayer book

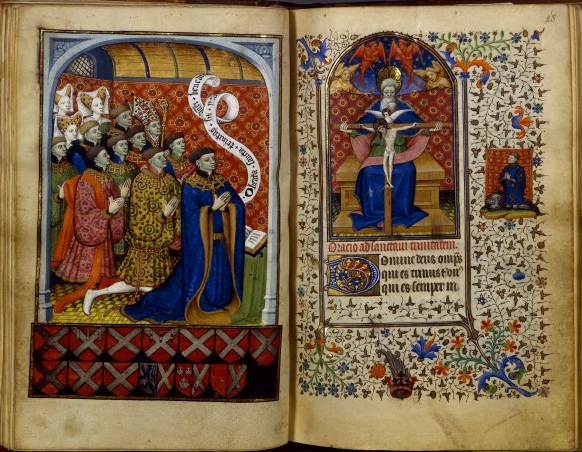
Portrait of Ralph Neville, 1st Earl of Westmorland (c. 1364–1425), with 9 of his sons and 3 of his daughters, in the Neville Hours (folios 27 verso - 28 recto)

The Neville Hours (Paris, BNF Lat1158; French: Heures de Neville) is a book of hours, an illuminated manuscript made in the first half of the 15th century and preserved in the French national library, Bibliothèque nationale de France, in Paris.

== History ==
The manuscript was made in France, possibly in Paris while the city was under English control during the Hundred Years' War. The style of the painting as well as details such as costumes and architecture are clearly French. Its calendar lists two unusual saints from Britany, namely Paul Aurelian and Lunaire. Conversely, the calendar does not contain mention of any English saints. The book has been stylistically dated to around 1420. It was made by an unknown illuminator artist, for an unknown patron, probably French and probably male. Sometime not long after, it passed into the ownership of Joan Beaufort, Countess of Westmorland or her husband, Ralph Neville, 1st Earl of Westmorland. At this point, two full-page miniatures were added to the miniature, attributed to the Master of the Munich Golden Legend. One of these depicts the son of Ralph Neville, Robert, wearing the robes of a bishop. He acquired the position of Bishop of Salisbury in 1427, and thus the miniatures must have been added between 1427 and 1440, the death date of Joan Beaufort. In the 17th century, it entered the collection of Kenelm Digby, who inscribed the book with his motto. Eventually it passed to Jean-Baptiste Colbert, and from him entered the royal, later national, library of France.

== Sources cited ==
- Leroquais, Victor (1927). Les livres d'heures manuscrits de la Bibliothèque nationale. Tome 1 (in French). Paris.
- Ungeheuer, Laurent (2015). Le Maître de la " Légende dorée " de Munich, un enlumineur parisien du milieu du XVe siècle : formation, production, influences et collaborations (in French). Paris: École pratique des hautes études - EPHE.
