= Ralph Neville, 1st Earl of Westmorland =

English nobleman (c. 1364–1425)

Ralph Neville
- 1st Earl of Westmorland; 4th Baron Neville de Raby (Note: The Oxford Dictionary of National Biography uses a different numbering system and numbers him the 6th Baron Neville and his father the 5th etc. (Tuck 2008).)
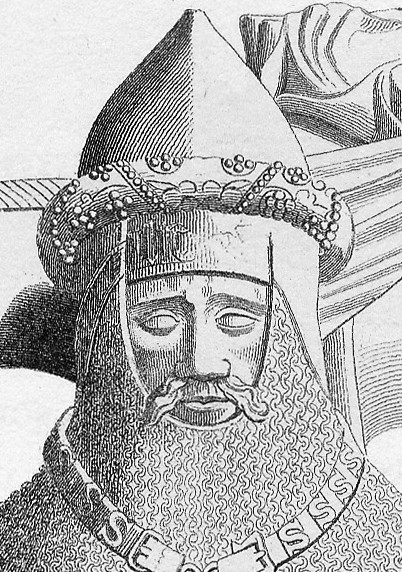
- Ralph Neville, 1st Earl of Westmorland, wearing the Lancastrian Collar of Esses; detail of his effigy at Staindrop Church, County Durham
- Born: c. 1364
- Died: 21 October 1425 (aged 60–61)
- Buried: St Mary's Church, Staindrop, County Durham, England
- Family: Neville
- Spouses: Margaret de Stafford (m. 1383; died 1396) Joan Beaufort (m. 1396)
- Issue more...: Maud Neville; Alice Neville; Philippa, Baroness Dacre; John, Lord Neville; Elizabeth Neville; Anne Neville; Sir Ralph Neville; Margaret Neville; Katherine, Duchess of Norfolk; Eleanor, Countess of Northumberland; Richard, 5th Earl of Salisbury; Robert, Bishop of Salisbury; William, Earl of Kent; George, 1st Baron Latimer; Anne, Duchess of Buckingham; Edward, 3rd Baron Bergavenny; Cecily, Duchess of York
- Father: John Neville, 3rd Baron Neville
- Mother: Maud Percy

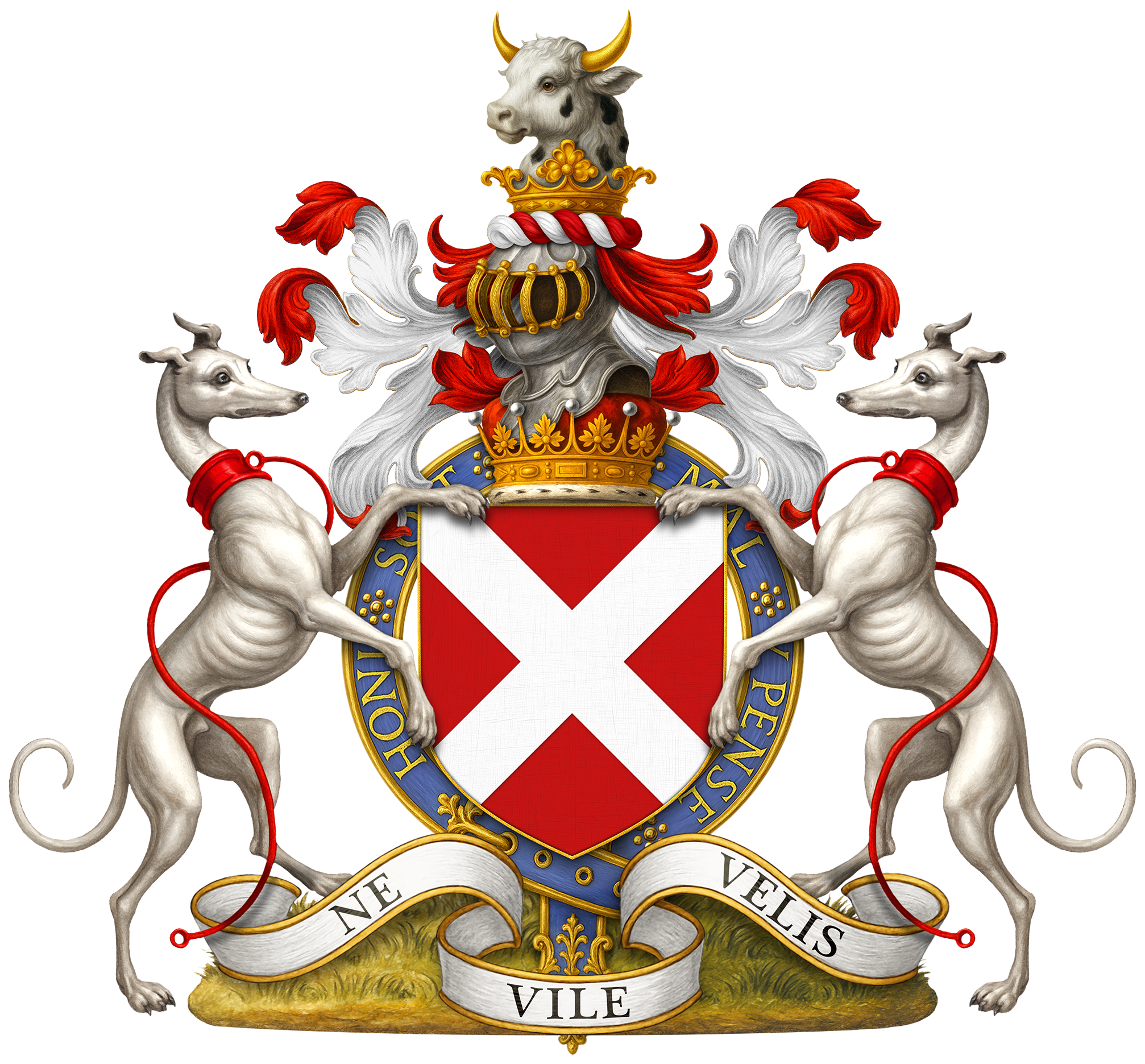
Garter-encircled arms of Ralph Neville, 1st Earl of Westmorland, KG - "Gules a saltire argent"

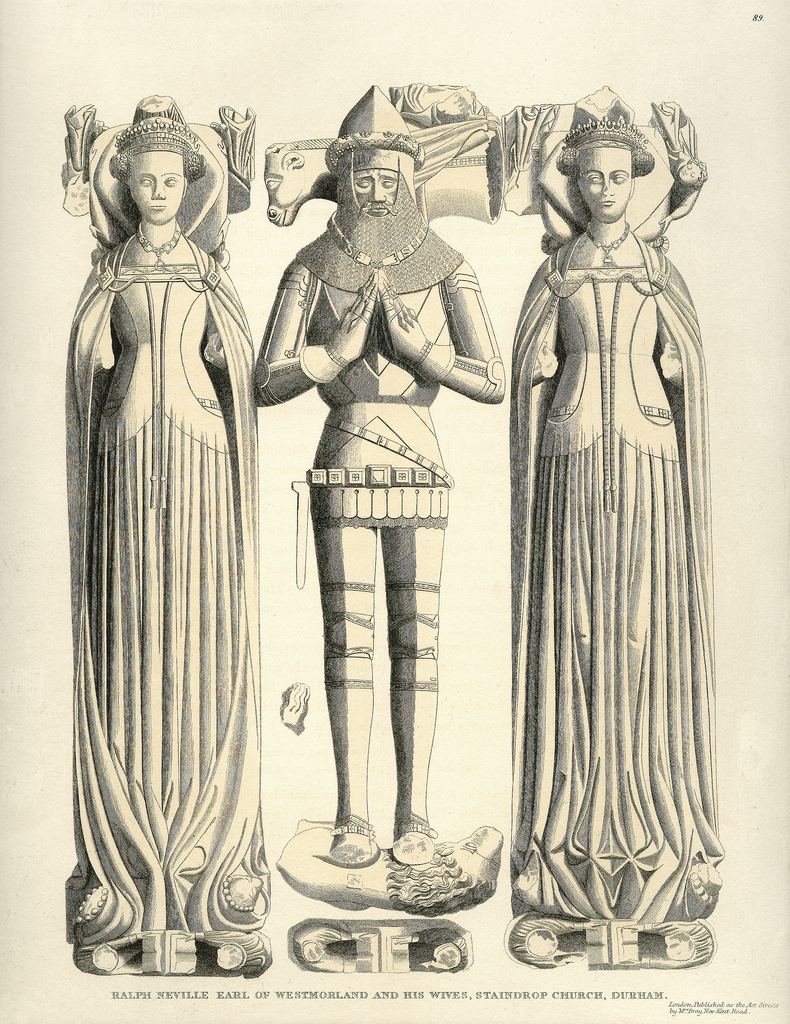
Alabaster effigy of Ralph Neville, 1st Earl of Westmorland with his two wives, Staindrop Church, County Durham, considered the finest sepulchral monument in the north of England. On his tunic he displays the arms of Neville; his head rests on a helm atop which is the bull's head crest of Neville

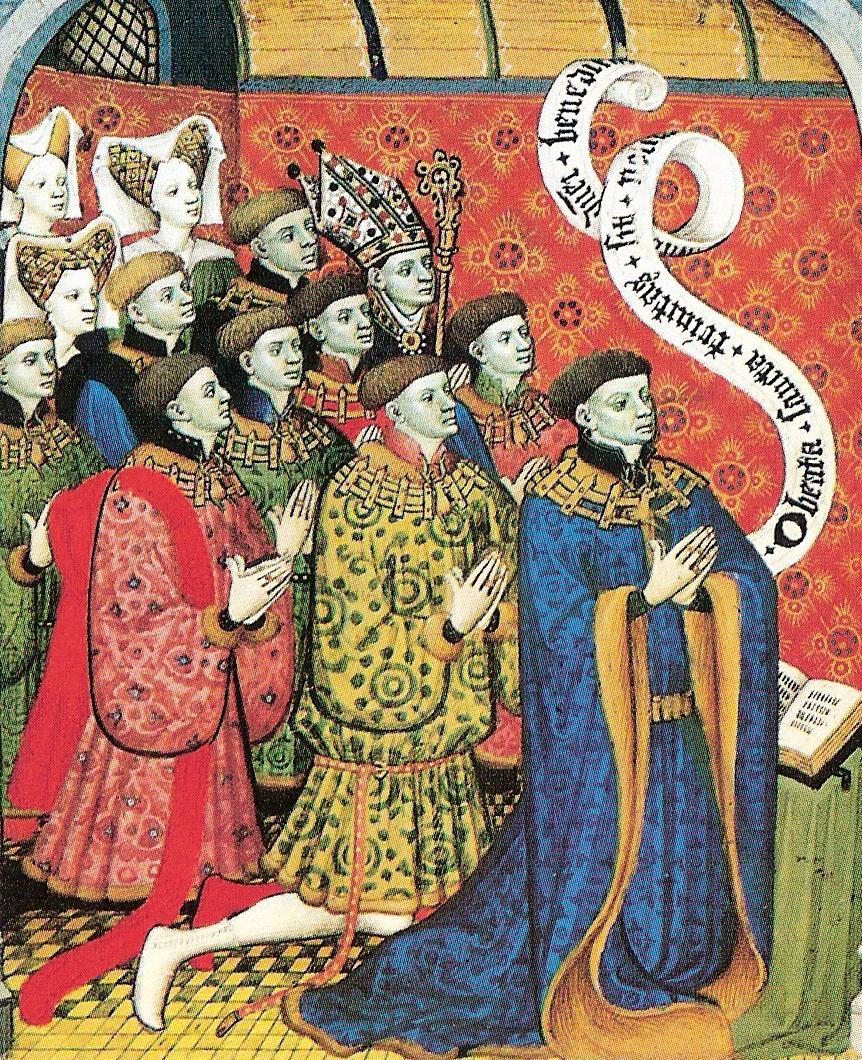
Contemporary miniature of the 1st Earl of Westmorland with twelve of his children in the Neville Hours. Another miniature (not pictured) features his second wife, Lady Joan Beaufort, with the rest of his children

Ralph Neville, 1st Earl of Westmorland KG PC Earl Marshal (c. 1364 – 21 October 1425), was an English nobleman of the House of Neville. Elevated to the earldom by King Richard II, he later supported his brother-in-law Henry Bolingbroke in deposing the king and became a key supporter of the Lancastrian dynasty. As a royal kinsman through his second marriage to Henry's half-sister Joan Beaufort, he was rewarded with high offices, including Earl Marshal, and played a central role in northern politics and border warfare with Scotland. He was the father of 22 children, and several of his children and grandchildren married into the English elite and royalty. Through his youngest daughter Cecily Neville, Duchess of York, he became an ancestor of every English and later British monarch following Edward IV.

== Origins ==
Ralph Neville was born about 1364, the son of John Neville, 3rd Baron Neville by his wife Maud Percy (d. 1379), a daughter of Henry de Percy, 2nd Baron Percy of Alnwick, Northumberland, by his wife Idoine de Clifford, a daughter of Robert de Clifford, 1st Baron de Clifford. Neville had a younger brother, and five sisters:

- Thomas Neville, 5th Baron Furnivall, who married Joan Furnival. Father of Maud Neville, 6th Baroness Furnivall, wife of John Talbot, 7th Baron Talbot.
- Lady Alice Neville, who married William Deincourt, 3rd Lord Deincourt
- Lady Maud Neville, who married Sir William le Scrope
- Lady Idoine Neville
- Lady Eleanor Neville, who married Ralph Lumley, 1st Baron Lumley.
- Lady Elizabeth Neville, who became a nun.

Neville's father married secondly, before 9 October 1381, Elizabeth Latimer (died 5 November 1395), daughter of William Latimer, 4th Baron Latimer. By his father's second marriage Neville had a brother and sister of the half blood:

- John Neville, 6th Baron Latimer (c. 1382 – 10 December 1430), who married firstly Maud Clifford (died c. 26 August 1446), daughter of Thomas Clifford, 6th Baron Clifford, whom he divorced before 1413–17, and by whom he had no issue. She married secondly Richard of Conisburgh, 3rd Earl of Cambridge, beheaded on 5 August 1415 for his part in the Southampton Plot.
- Lady Elizabeth Neville, who married Sir Thomas Willoughby.

== Career ==
Neville's first military service was in Brittany under King Richard II's uncle, Thomas of Woodstock, who knighted him at Saint-Omer in July 1380. On 14 November 1381 he and his cousin, Henry "Hotspur" Percy, were commissioned to preside over a duel between an Englishman and a Scot, and on 1 December 1383 he and his father were commissioned to receive from the Scots 24,000 marks for the ransom of King David. On 26 October 1385 he was appointed joint Governor of Carlisle with Sir Thomas Clifford, and on 27 March 1386 was appointed, together with Clifford, joint Warden of the West March.

Neville inherited the title at the age of 24 after his father's death on 17 October 1388, and was summoned to Parliament from 6 December 1389 to 30 November 1396 by writs directed to Radulpho de Nevyll de Raby. On 25 October 1388, he was appointed, with others, to survey the fortifications on the Scottish border, and on 24 May 1389 was made keeper for life of the royal forests north of the Trent. In 1393 and 1394 he was employed in peace negotiations with Scotland.

In 1397 Neville supported King Richard's proceedings against Thomas of Woodstock and the Lords Appellant, and by way of reward was created Earl of Westmorland on 29 September of that year. However his loyalty to the King was tested shortly thereafter. His first wife, Margaret Stafford, had died on 9 June 1396, and Neville's second marriage to Joan Beaufort before 29 November 1396 made him the son-in-law of King Richard's uncle, John of Gaunt, 1st Duke of Lancaster. Thus, when King Richard banished John of Gaunt's eldest son and heir, Henry Bolingbroke, on 16 September 1398, and confiscated Bolingbroke's estates after John of Gaunt's death on 3 February 1399, Westmorland was moved to support his brother-in-law. Bolingbroke landed with a small force at Ravenspur in July 1399. Westmorland and the Earl of Northumberland were in the deputation at the Tower which received King Richard's abdication, and Westmorland bore the small sceptre called the "virge" at Bolingbroke's coronation as King Henry IV on 13 October 1399.

For his support of the new King, Westmorland was rewarded with a lifetime appointment as Earl Marshal on 30 September 1399 (although he resigned the office in 1412), a lifetime grant of the honour of Richmond on 20 October (although the grant was not accompanied by a grant of the title Earl of Richmond), and several wardships. Before 4 December he was appointed to the King's council. In March 1401, Westmorland was one of the commissioners who conducted negotiations for a marriage between the King's eldest daughter, Blanche of England, and Louis, son of Rupert, King of the Romans, and in 1403 was made a Knight of the Garter, taking the place left vacant by the death of Edmund of Langley, 1st Duke of York.

According to Tuck, Westmorland had little influence on the Scottish borders in the first years of Henry IV's reign, where the wardenships of the marches were monopolised by the Percys, leading to a growing rivalry between the two families. However, in 1403 the Percys, spurred on by various grievances, took up arms against the King, and suffered defeat at the Battle of Shrewsbury on 21 July 1403. Northumberland's son, Henry Percy ("Hotspur"), was slain at Shrewsbury, and Northumberland's brother, the Earl of Worcester, was beheaded two days later. After Shrewsbury, King Henry ordered Westmorland to raise troops and prevent Northumberland's army, which was still in the north, from advancing south. On 6 August 1403, as a reward for his service in driving Northumberland back to Warkworth Castle, Westmorland was granted the wardenship of the West March which Northumberland had held since 1399, the wardenship of the East March, formerly held by Hotspur, being granted to the King's 14-year-old son, John of Lancaster, 1st Duke of Bedford.

Two years later Northumberland, joined by Lord Bardolf, again rebelled against Henry. It had been Northumberland's plan to capture the earl by surprise at the outset, and in early May 1405, with 400 men, Northumberland made a surprise attack at the castle of Witton-le-Wear, where he had been staying. The attempt failed, as Westmorland had already fled. The earl speedily gathered an army, defeated a force of Percy allies at Topcliffe, and then marched towards York with Henry IV's son, John of Lancaster, to confront a force of some 8000 men gathered on Shipton Moor under the leadership of Archbishop Richard Scrope, Thomas de Mowbray, 4th Earl of Norfolk, and Scrope's nephew, Sir William Plumpton. Outnumbered by Scrope's forces, Westmorland resorted to trickery, and led Scrope and his allies to believe that their demands would be accepted and their personal safety guaranteed. Once Scrope's army had been disbanded on 29 May, Scrope, Mowbray and Plumpton were arrested, summarily condemned to death for treason, and beheaded outside the walls of York on 8 June 1405. Although Westmorland handed Scrope and his allies over to the King at Pontefract, he played no role in their hasty and irregular trial and execution, having been sent north by the King on 4 June to seize Northumberland's castles. It is unclear whether Northumberland had initially planned to rebel openly in concert with Scrope, but in the event, he gave Scrope no support and fled to Scotland after his failed attempt to capture Westmorland. His estates were subsequently forfeited to the crown, and Ralph, earl of Westmorland, as a reward for his quelling of the 1405 rebellion without significant bloodshed, received a large grant of former Percy lands in Cumberland and Northumberland in June 1405.

After the death of Henry IV Westmorland was mainly engaged in the defence of the northern border in his capacity as Warden of the West March (1403–1414). In 1415 he decisively defeated an invading Scottish army at the Battle of Yeavering. Westmorland played no part in King Henry V's French campaigns, and Tuck notes that his relationship with Henry V was not close, perhaps partly because of the involvement of Westmorland's son-in-law, Sir Thomas Grey of Heaton, in the Southampton Plot. After Henry V's death, Westmorland was a member of the Council of Regency during the minority of King Henry VI.

According to Tait, Westmorland was "no inconsiderable builder", citing his rebuilding of Sheriff Hutton Castle on a scale so magnificent that Leland saw "no house in the north so like a princely lodging", his doubling of the entrance gateway of Raby Castle and the corresponding tower, and possibly his responsibility for the "tall and striking tower" of Richmond parish church. On 1 November 1410 Westmorland was granted licence to found a college for a master, six clerks, six "decayed gentlemen" and others at Staindrop, towards the completion of which he left a bequest in his will. He was probably responsible for the building of Penrith castle in Cumberland c. 1412–13.

== Marriages and issue ==
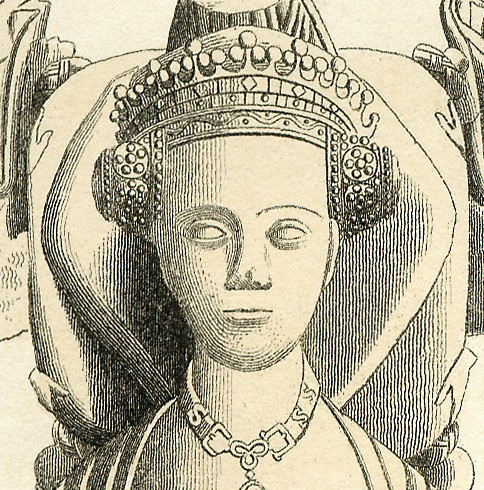
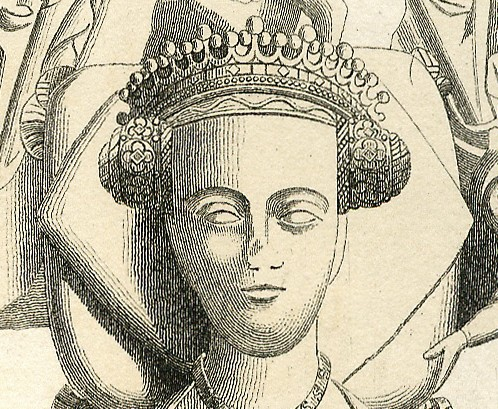
The two wives of Ralph Neville, 1st Earl of Westmorland, from his monumental effigy, Staindrop Church. His first wife, left, on his right-hand side

Ralph Neville married twice and had 22 children:

=== First marriage ===
He married firstly Margaret Stafford (died 9 June 1396), the eldest daughter of Hugh Stafford, 2nd Earl of Stafford, by his wife Philippa Beauchamp, a daughter of Thomas Beauchamp, 11th Earl of Warwick (by his wife Katherine Mortimer, the daughter of Roger Mortimer, 1st Earl of March). By Margaret Stafford he had two sons and six daughters:

- Maud Neville (died October 1438), who married Peter Mauley, 5th Baron Mauley.
- Alice Neville, who married firstly Sir Thomas Grey, beheaded on 2 August 1415 for his part in the Southampton Plot, and secondly Sir Gilbert Lancaster.
- Philippa Neville, who married, before 20 July 1399, Thomas Dacre, 6th Baron Dacre of Gilsland (died 5 January 1458).
- Sir John Neville (c. 1387 – before 20 May 1420), who predeceased his father. He married Elizabeth Holland, fifth daughter of Thomas Holland, 2nd Earl of Kent, and Alice FitzAlan, and by her had three sons and a daughter:
  - Ralph Neville, 2nd Earl of Westmorland (1406–1484), heir to his grandfather;
  - John Neville, Baron Neville;
  - Sir Thomas Neville (before 20 May 1420 – 1459);
  - Margaret Neville (c. 1408 – before 1434).
- Elizabeth Neville, a nun.
- Anne Neville (died after March 1421), who married, before 3 February 1413, Sir Gilbert Umfraville (slain at the Battle of Baugé in Anjou on 22 March 1421), son of Sir Thomas Umfraville (died 12 February 1391) and Agnes Grey (died 25 October 1420), a daughter of Sir Thomas Grey (d. before 22 October 1369) of Heaton.
- Sir Ralph Neville (died 25 February 1458), who married, before 1411, his step-sister, Mary Ferrers, daughter of Robert Ferrers of Wem and Joan Beaufort.
- Margaret Neville (died 1463/4), who married firstly, before 31 December 1413, Richard Scrope, 3rd Baron Scrope of Bolton, and secondly, William Cressener, Esquire.

=== Second marriage ===
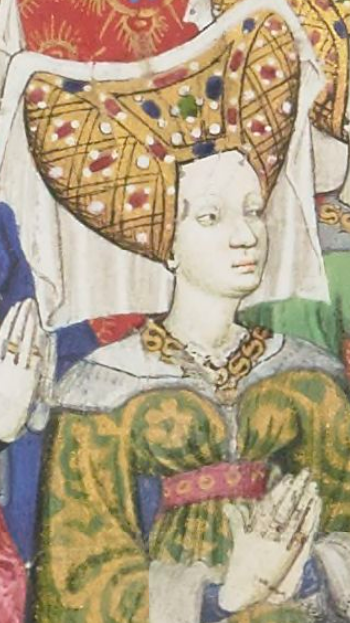
Cecily Neville (1415–1495), a daughter of Ralph Neville by his second wife Joan Beaufort. She married Richard, 3rd Duke of York by whom she was the mother of King Edward IV and King Richard III

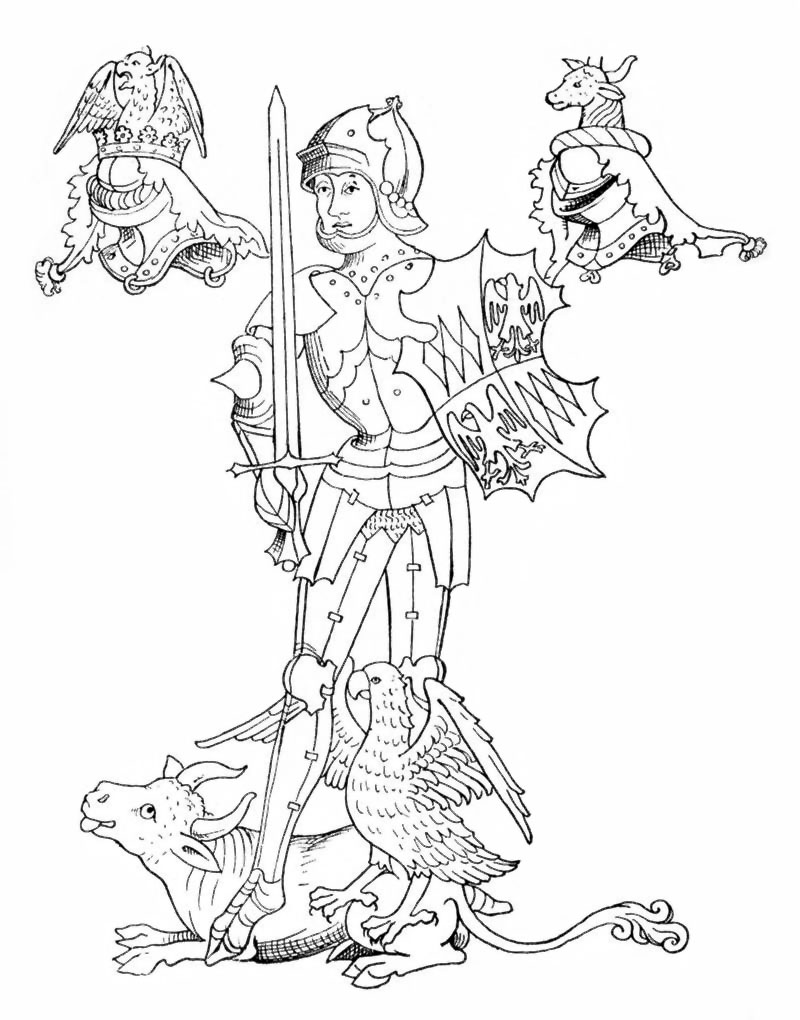
Richard Neville, 16th Earl of Warwick (1428–1471), "The Kingmaker", a grandson of Ralph Neville, 1st Earl of Westmorland, and Joan Beaufort. On his shield he displays his maternal arms of Montacute, but displays the Neville bull's head crest at sinister and stands on the same Neville heraldic beast

Neville married secondly, before 29 November 1396, at Château de Beaufort, Maine-et-Loire, Anjou, France, to Joan Beaufort, the widow of Robert Ferrers, 2nd Baron Ferrers (1373–1396), and the legitimated daughter of John of Gaunt, 1st Duke of Lancaster (3rd son of King Edward III), by his mistress (and later third wife) Katherine Swynford. By Joan Beaufort he had nine sons and five daughters:

- Katherine Neville (c. 1397 – c. 1483), married firstly, on 12 January 1411 to John de Mowbray, 2nd Duke of Norfolk, secondly to Sir Thomas Strangways, thirdly to John Beaumont, 1st Viscount Beaumont, fourthly to Sir John Woodville (died 12 August 1469).
- Eleanor Neville (c. 1398–1472), married firstly to Richard le Despencer, 4th Baron Burghersh, secondly to Henry Percy, 2nd Earl of Northumberland.
- Richard Neville, 5th Earl of Salisbury (1400–1460), who married Alice Montacute, suo jure 5th Countess of Salisbury. Their son was Richard Neville, 16th Earl of Warwick (1428–1471), "The Kingmaker".
- Henry Neville (c. 1402).
- Robert Neville (1404–1457), Bishop of Salisbury and Bishop of Durham.
- William Neville, 1st Earl of Kent (c. 1405–1463).
- John Neville (c. 1406).
- George Neville, 1st Baron Latimer (c. 1407–1469).
- Anne Neville (c. 1408–1480), married firstly to Humphrey Stafford, 1st Duke of Buckingham, secondly to Walter Blount, 1st Baron Mountjoy.
- Thomas Neville (c. 1410).
- Cuthbert Neville (c. 1411).
- Joan Neville (c. 1412 – 1453), a nun.
- Edward Neville, 3rd Baron Bergavenny (c. 1414–1476).
- Cecily Neville (1415–1495), married to Richard, 3rd Duke of York, by whom she was the mother of King Edward IV and King Richard III.

== Death, burial, and succession ==
Westmorland died on 21 October 1425 and was buried in the choir of his Collegiate Church of St. Mary at Staindrop. The magnificent alabaster tomb with effigies of himself and his two wives there has been termed the finest sepulchral monument in the north of England. Neither of his wives is buried with him. His first wife, Margaret Stafford, was buried at Brancepeth, County Durham, while his second wife, Joan Beaufort, was buried with her mother under a stone canopy in the sanctuary of Lincoln Cathedral.

Westmorland was predeceased by his eldest son Sir John Neville (c.1387–1420), and was succeeded in the title by his grandson (the latter's son) Ralph Neville, 2nd Earl of Westmorland (1406–1484).

== Shakespeare and Westmorland ==
Westmorland is portrayed in Shakespeare's Henry IV, Part 1, Henry IV, Part 2, and Henry V.

In the opening scene of Henry IV, Part 1, Westmorland is presented historically as an ally of King Henry IV against the Percys, and in the final scenes of the play as being dispatched to the north of England by the King after the Battle of Shrewsbury to intercept the Earl of Northumberland.

In Act IV of Henry IV, Part 2, Westmorland is portrayed historically as having been principally responsible for quelling the Percy rebellion in 1405 by Archbishop Scrope almost without bloodshed by successfully parleying with the rebels on 29 May 1405 at Shipton Moor.

However, in Henry V Westmorland is unhistorically alleged to have resisted the arguments made in favour of war with France by Archbishop Chichele during the Fire and Faggot Parliament, which began at Leicester on 30 April 1414. Following Hall and Holinshed, Shakespeare attributes these arguments to Chichele at a time when Chichele was not yet formally Archbishop, although he had been appointed by the King immediately following the death of Archbishop Arundel on 14 February 1414. Moreover, it is said that the Parliamentary rolls do not record Chichele's presence, and according to Tait the question of war with France was not discussed. In addition, Westmorland's speech urging the advantages of war against Scotland rather than France is said to have been adapted from a work by the Scottish historian John Major, who was not born until half a century after the 1414 Parliament.

The First Folio text of Henry V also unhistorically gives these lines to Westmorland on the eve of Agincourt:

O that we now had here
But one ten thousand of those men in England
That do no work today. (Henry V, IV.iii)

Westmorland was not with King Henry V on the 1415 campaign in France. On 17 April 1415 he was appointed to the Council of Regency which was to govern England under the King's brother, John of Lancaster, 1st Duke of Bedford, during the King's absence in France, with special responsibility for the Scottish Marches. In the first quarto text of the play, the foregoing lines are assigned to the Earl of Warwick.

It has been claimed by Brenda James and Professor William Rubinstein that Neville's great-great-great-grandson Sir Henry Neville wrote the works of William Shakespeare.

== Notes ==
Political offices
Preceded by The Duke of Surrey	Earl Marshal; 1400–1412	Succeeded by The Duke of Norfolk
Peerage of England
New creation	Earl of Westmorland; 1397–1425	Succeeded by Ralph Neville
Preceded by John Neville	Baron Neville de Raby; 1388–1425	Succeeded by Ralph Neville
