= Katherine Neville, Duchess of Norfolk =

English noblewoman (c. 1397–1483)

Katherine Neville
- Duchess of Norfolk
- Born: c. 1397
- Died: c. August 1483 (aged 85–86); Epworth, Lincolnshire, England
- Family: Neville
- Spouse: John Mowbray, 2nd Duke of Norfolk (m. 1412; died 1432) Thomas Strangeways (m. 1432; died 1442) John Beaumont, 1st Viscount Beaumont (m. 1442; died 1460) Sir John Woodville (m. 1465; died 1469)
- Issue: John Mowbray, 3rd Duke of Norfolk; Joan Strangeways; Catherine Strangeways
- Father: Ralph Neville, 1st Earl of Westmorland
- Mother: Joan Beaufort

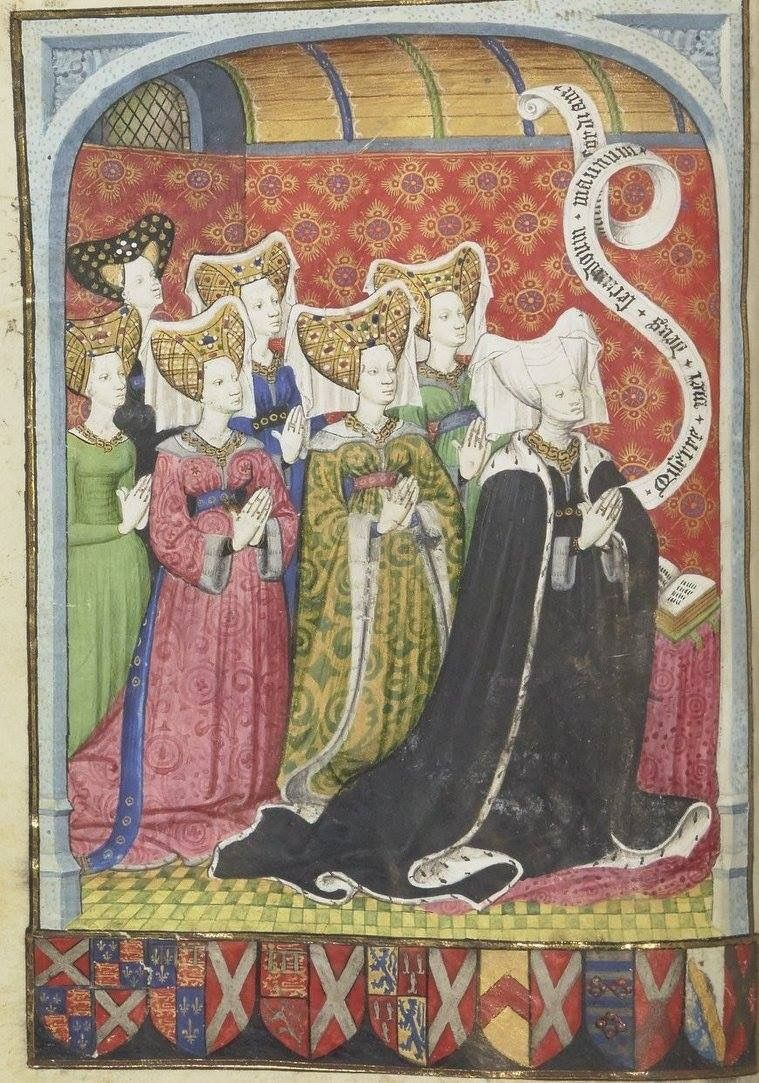
Joan Beaufort 1379-1440 Countess of Westmorland and her six daughters

Katherine Neville (c. 1397 – c. August 1483) was a medieval English noblewoman, the eldest daughter of Ralph Neville, 1st Earl of Westmorland, and his second wife Joan Beaufort. Through her mother, she was a granddaughter of John of Gaunt and a great-granddaughter of King Edward III.

== First marriage ==
On 12 January 1412, Katherine was married at the age of 15 to John Mowbray, 2nd Duke of Norfolk (1392–1432). Their only known child was John de Mowbray, 3rd Duke of Norfolk (1415–1461).

== Second marriage ==
Katherine married for a second time to Thomas Strangeways (c. 1395-before 1442) - they had two daughters:

- Joan Strangeways, who first married Sir William Willoughby, before 20 July 1461. Their daughter Cecily married Edward Sutton, 2nd Baron Dudley. They were ancestors of Herbert Hoover, among many others. Joan married for a second time to William Berkeley in November 1468; they had one son, Thomas, and one daughter, Katherine.
- Katherine Strangeways, who married Henry Grey, 4th (7th) Baron Grey of Codnor, 29 August 1454.

== Third marriage ==
She married for a third time to John, Viscount Beaumont, in 1442, who was killed in 1460 at the battle of Northampton. He was also the first viscount in England.

== Fourth marriage ==
Her fourth and last marriage in 1465 was infamous, known by contemporaries as the "diabolical marriage". She married John Woodville, brother of Queen Elizabeth. Chronicler William Worcester referred to the match as being rotting revenge for both parties "vindicta Bernardi inter cosdem postem putrit". He was 19 years old at the time of their marriage, while she was about 68. Nonetheless, she survived him, as he was executed in 1469 after the Battle of Edgecote, on the orders of her nephew Richard Neville, 16th Earl of Warwick, during a Lancastrian rebellion against Edward IV. Whether or not she was forced into her final marriage against her will is unclear, but the unsavoury details added to the deep dislike of the Queen's family among the ruling class, which greatly weakened the Yorkist dynasty.

== Death ==
She was still alive in 1483, having survived all her children. She was last seen in public at the coronation of her nephew, Richard III.

== Ancestry ==
Ancestors of Katherine Neville, Duchess of Norfolk

8. Ralph Neville, 2nd Baron Neville de Raby
4. John Neville, 3rd Baron Neville de Raby
9. Alice Audley
2. Ralph Neville, 1st Earl of Westmorland
10. Henry de Percy, 2nd Baron Percy of Alnwick
5. Maud Percy
11. Idonea Clifford
1. Katherine Neville, Duchess of Norfolk
12. Edward III of England
6. John of Gaunt, 1st Duke of Lancaster
13. Philippa of Hainault
3. Joan Beaufort
14. Sir Payne de Roet
7. Katherine Swynford
