= John Mowbray, 2nd Duke of Norfolk =

English noble (1392–1432)

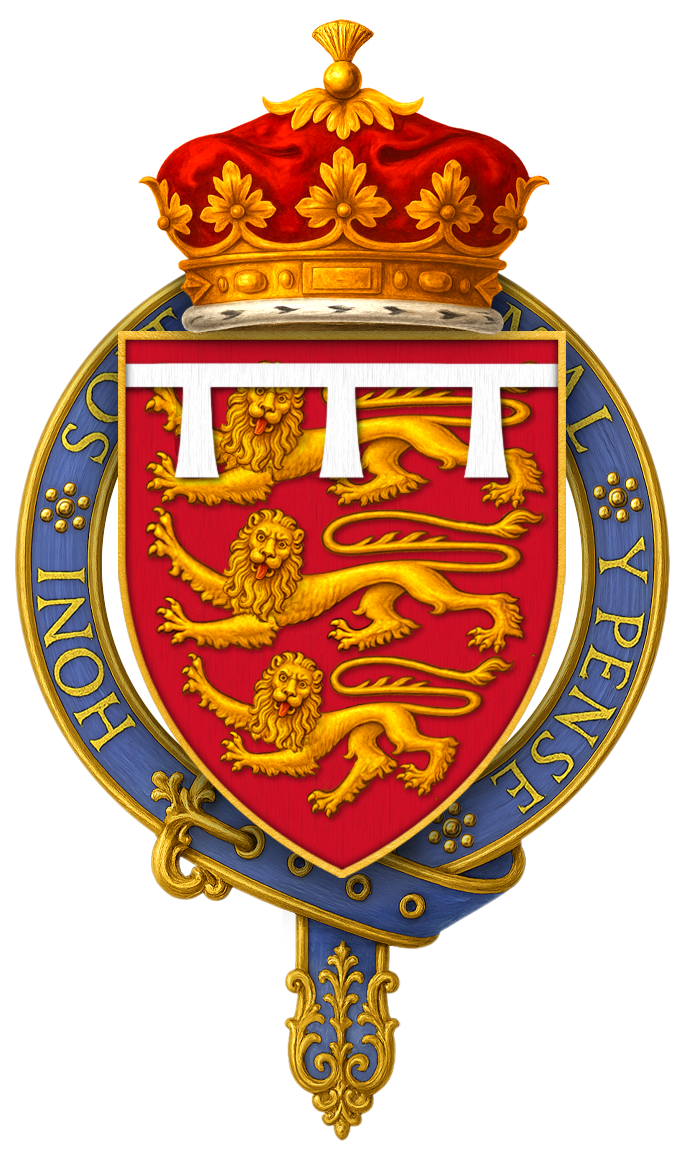
- Coat of arms
- Predecessor: Thomas Mowbray, 1st Duke of Norfolk
- Successor: John Mowbray, 3rd Duke of Norfolk
- Born: 1392
- Died: 19 October 1432 (aged 39–40)
- Spouse: Katherine Neville, Duchess of Norfolk
- Issue: John Mowbray, 3rd Duke of Norfolk
- Father: Thomas Mowbray, 1st Duke of Norfolk
- Mother: Elizabeth Fitzalan, Duchess of Norfolk

John de Mowbray, 2nd Duke of Norfolk, 3rd Earl of Nottingham, 8th Baron Mowbray, 9th Baron Segrave KG, Earl Marshal (1392 – 19 October 1432) was an English nobleman and soldier. He was a younger son of the first Duke of Norfolk and Lady Elizabeth Fitzalan, but inherited his father's earldom of Norfolk (but not the dukedom) when his elder brother rebelled against King Henry IV and was executed before reaching the age of inheritance. This and the fact that his mother lived to old age and held a third of his estates in dower, meant that until the last few years of his life he was, although an important political figure, poorly-off financially.

Probably due to the need to augment his income, he took the still-popular path for young members of the English nobility by taking part in the Hundred Years' War in France. His first campaign was in 1415 with Henry V, and although he took part in some of the great expeditions, he, like so many of his comrades, fell badly ill with dysentery and had to return to England. For this reason, he missed the Battle of Agincourt.

When Henry V died in 1422, Mowbray remained a leading commander of the armed forces in France for the new boy-king, Henry VI. He continued campaigning there for the next five years, and, when parliament decided it was time to crown the new young king—in both Westminster Abbey and in France—Mowbray acted as both royal bodyguard and councillor. He also took part in Humphrey, Duke of Gloucester's personal campaign in Hainaut, which appears for once to have been profitable to him.

Foreign service occupied most of Mowbray's career but often cost him more than he gained from any spoils. Hence it was not until his mother died in 1425 that his fortunes changed for the better; not only did he inherit her large share of his father's estates, but he also received promotion from Earl of Norfolk to Duke of Norfolk. This followed a bitter dispute, while he was still earl, with Richard Beauchamp, Earl of Warwick, as to who held precedence within the English peerage; the question was never resolved, but avoided by making Mowbray a duke.

Whilst still a youth Mowbray had been married by his guardian, Ralph Neville, 1st Earl of Westmorland, to Neville's eldest daughter, Katherine; Mowbray's marriage had cost Westmorland the princely sum of £2,000. John and Katherine had one son, also named John. Mowbray died in 1432, and his heir and namesake, although still a minor, inherited the dukedom. He was to have a relatively short career, although one which made him a significant player in the later Wars of the Roses. Katherine not only survived Mowbray but was to live until 1483, and she took three more husbands before her death, the last of whom, John Woodville, was young enough to be her grandson.

== Youth and early career ==
John Mowbray was born in Calais in 1392. He was the younger of two sons to Thomas Mowbray, 1st Duke of Norfolk and his second wife Elizabeth Fitzalan. Thomas Mowbray had died in 1399, and in 1405 John Mowbray's elder brother—also named Thomas—rebelled against King Henry IV. The rebellion failed, Thomas was beheaded for treason, and John succeeded to his father's earldoms of Norfolk and Nottingham as 5th and 3rd earl respectively. Whilst still only about fifteen in 1407, he was made a ward of his great-aunt Joan, Countess of Hereford (who was also the king's mother-in-law). Since she did not live at court, but in Essex (at either the castles of Rochford or Pleshey) it is likely her wards lived with her there (she also had custody of Richard de Vere, heir to the earldom of Oxford). Joan received an annuity to pay for his upkeep which had increased from £100 to £300 by 1410, in which year he left her wardship and became a ward of the king in the royal household. At the same time, even though still a minor, Mowbray began gradually receiving some of his patrimonial estates back from the crown. Thirteen at the time of his brother's death, he was made a ward of the Earl of Westmorland in 1411, who paid £2,000 for John's custody and marriage. Westmorland was a major northern magnate who had by this time repeatedly supported King Henry against various rebellions in the region.

On 12 January the following year, John married Neville's eldest daughter, Katherine. At this time he also received the return of his family's hereditary office of Earl Marshal, which had been granted to Westmorland in 1399 on the death of John's father. Historian Christine Carpenter has suggested that his restoration was part of Henry V's policy of reconciling the families that had rebelled against his father. Chris Given-Wilson has noted that in spite of this spirit of reconciliation, none of the heirs received outright their treacherous fathers' lands, and that this, therefore, made John Mowbray more likely to be "dependent on the crown" for additional sources of income. G. L. Harriss described Mowbray as "younger than the king and anxious to recover forfeited lands and titles and restore... family honour".

King Henry IV died in March 1413 and was succeeded by his eldest son, who became Henry V. It was probably at his coronation, on 9 April that year, that Mowbray first exercised his office of Earl Marshal, and as a fee, he was paid with a silver dish, worth approximately twenty-five marks. Furthermore, one of the old King's last acts, in early March, had been to restore Mowbray to full seisin of his estates, and to confirm him as Earl of Nottingham. Two days after the king's death, the earl was summoned to the parliament for the first time; however, he "continued to badger" the new king, Henry V, for the restoration of his full estates.

== Military service in France ==
=== Under Henry V ===
By the spring of 1414, the new king was publicly reiterating the claim to the French throne that English Kings had traditionally upheld. By April the next year, Mowbray indentured with the King for military service in France, contracting to supply four knights, forty-five men at arms, and 150 archers. On top of military personnel, Mowbray's extant accounts indicate that he also had to pay not only for materiél (such as tents, horses, armour, weapons and livery), but for support staff such as surgeons, priests, armourers and cooks. Providing this contingent and other preparations cost him £2,500, of which, eventually, only £1,450 was returned to him in campaign wages. So poor were Mowbray's finances at this time that he had had to borrow 1,000 marks from the Earl of Arundel; worse, he had to resort to the "dubious practice" of claiming that innocent—but prosperous—townsmen (from Norwich, for example) were in fact runaway villeins, and effectively blackmailed them with manumission fines. The Agincourt campaign ultimately cost Mowbray £1,000 more than he was paid.

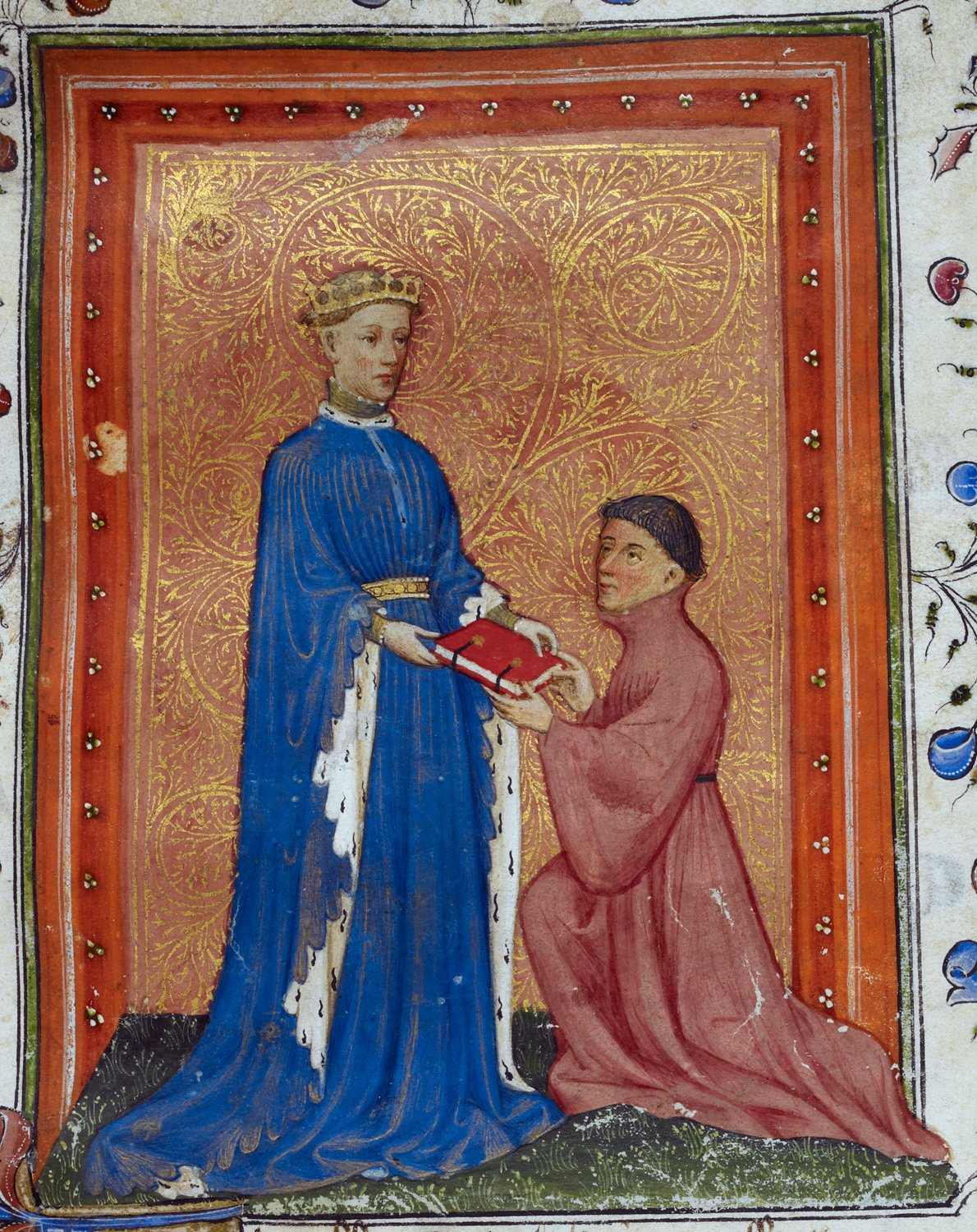
Henry V, while Prince of Wales, presenting Thomas Hoccleve's Regement of Princes to John de Mowbray, 2nd Duke of Norfolk, 1411–1413, British Library

The King's expedition was due to leave from Southampton in August 1415; just before it did, however, a treasonous plot against Henry V was uncovered, which involved his cousin, Richard, Earl of Cambridge. In his capacity as Earl Marshal, Mowbray led the investigation into the plot on 1 August; four days later he sat in judgement upon them in a trial which ultimately condemned the conspirators to death.

Henry V's expeditionary force landed in France on 14 August, and Mowbray took part in the first major engagement, the siege of Harfleur. It was also his last engagement of the campaign—having caught the dysentery that was ravaging the English army, he (and around a quarter of his force and a third of the entire English army) returned to England in October to recover. As a result, John Mowbray was unable to take part in what became the most famous battle of the campaign, at Agincourt, which took place on 25 October soon after he left France. He recuperated at his family seat at Epworth, Lincolnshire, although he had recovered sufficiently by November to travel to London to welcome the victorious Henry V home. Early the following year he also took part in the welcoming committee that greeted the Emperor Sigismund at Dover on his visit to England, which resulted in the Treaty of Canterbury of 1416.

The following year Mowbray again contracted to go to France, this time with a bigger force than before, at 100 men-at-arms and 300 archers; he would not return to England for five years. During this period of the war he took part in some of the major sieges of the campaign, for example, those of Caen, Louviers, and Rouen. In February 1419, he was appointed to the captaincy of two French towns, but it would seem that Henry V—realising that these appointments would keep Mowbray occupied there, and "being apparently unwilling to proceed without his marshal"—cancelled them soon after. As a consequence of this, Mowbray was available to participate in the sieges of Évreux, Vernon, Ivry, Gisors and Melun later that year, the latter of which he played a major role, receiving its surrender in October that year.

In 1420, Mowbray continued with his success in the military; the extent of his activity is indicated by the fact that he had to allow duties in England to pass by. He passed Christmas 1419 with the king at his Rouen base, until March, when he captured the town of Fresnay-le-Vicomte (with John Holland, Earl of Huntingdon), which was followed by the Battle of Le Mans the same month, in which the Dauphin, Charles Valois, was routed. That Christmas he indentured again with the king, this time accepting the captaincy of Pontoise and contracting to provide 60 men-at-arms and 180 archers for the purpose. This appointment—Rowena Archer described it as an "onerous" one—was sufficient to prevent Mowbray from accompanying the King to England. Mowbray was only able to travel with Henry as far as Amiens; the king had just married Katherine of Valois, and they were travelling to England for her coronation. Mowbray should have attended per his office of Earl Marshal; the Earl of Worcester deputised for him. Similarly, when Mowbray was elected to the Order of the Garter, his installation had to be received for him by Rowland Lenthal, later High Sheriff of Hertfordshire.

=== With the Duke of Gloucester ===
What has been described as a "curious" episode in Mowbray's career occurred in 1424. Already friends with Humphrey, Duke of Gloucester, when the duke decided to invade the county of Hainaut in November that year, Mowbray journeyed with him and acted as his military commander. Little is known of this expedition except that, having raided Brabant, it was probably profitable for Mowbray.

=== Under Henry VI ===
Mowbray was still in France when King Henry returned in 1421, maintaining a front line at Vermandois, Tierche and the Laonnois against La Hire and Jean Poton de Xaintrailles. It was only when the king died unexpectedly on 31 August 1422 that the earl returned to England accompanying the corpse. He attended parliament that year, although he was summoned under the name "Thomas", and Archer posits that that clerical error is indicative of how little, due to his French service, he was known in England. He also joined the royal council that the recent parliament had ordained would govern the country through the new King's long minority. Ralph Griffiths has also suggested that Norfolk's admission to that body "provided an injection of youth into discussions hitherto conducted by a rather elderly group."

He was not a particularly regular attendee to the council, and within a year, he had contracted again to serve abroad, on this occasion bringing 115 men-at-arms and 300 archers with Lords Willoughby, Hungerford, and the Duke of Exeter. Although Mowbray did not participate in the Battle of Cravant, which took place on 31 July 1423, he was not inactive; having taken part in so many sieges in his career, he was assisting Jean de Luxembourg in his efforts to relieve Bohain, and later the Lyonnais castle of La Folleye. This campaign appears to have succeeded in its brief of the "protection and defence" of English France, and not only was Normandy almost cleared of enemy forces, the English even managed some "daring sorties" beyond the region.

Although by now a leader of the royal armies in France, Rowena Archer suggests that it was around this time that his martial enthusiasm for royal service began to pale, at least in part because "it had owed much to his personal service to Henry V and to his office as marshal." But the new King was a baby, and with no further major campaigns taking place during the young king's minority, Mowbray's office of Earl Marshal was effectively unused. On 19 May 1426, the Duke of Bedford knighted the young king, who in turn dubbed a number of new knights from amongst the heirs of the nobility, including John Mowbray's son and namesake.

== Later career and death ==
John Mowbray nearly drowned in the River Thames in November 1428 after his barge capsized after hitting a pier beneath London Bridge; he lost a number of his household in this accident. Mowbray was present in the council that same year which denounced the Duke of Gloucester's re-asserted attempt to increase his authority; Mowbray signed his name to an "astonished" memoranda that the duke would think of such a thing when the king was increasingly close to attaining his majority and with it being ready "to occupy his full royal power."

By May 1429, he had written his first surviving will. The first major occasion on which he performed the office of Marshall again was the king's coronation at Westminster. Mowbray also took part in the first major campaign of Henry VI's reign which was a direct follow-on from the London coronation. In 1430 it was decided by the King's Council to crown Henry in both England, at Westminster Abbey, and then in France, hopefully in Paris. Mowbray contracted to bring a large force of 120 men-at-arms and 360 archers and led the army that accompanied the royal entourage. Mowbray, along with other members of the nobility, acted as both the kernel of the king's court and an experienced council while the king was in France. In an attempt to aid the Duke of Burgundy, Norfolk launched an assault on Gournay-sur-Aronde with 1,000 men and likewise took part in other attacks on Dammartin and La Chasse in the Île-de-France. However, he had returned to England before the Paris coronation of Henry in December 1431.

John Mowbray died on 19 October 1432 at Epworth, Lincolnshire, where his father had founded a Cistercian monastery. He had written his second will that same day, and like the first one it requested that his father's bones be returned from Venice (where he had died of plague returning from Crusade), and buried on the Isle of Axholme. Mowbray too requested interment there.

== Estates and income ==
Mowbray's wealth was adversely affected by his service in France. The Agincourt campaign, for example, cost him around £2,000, the detailed expenditure being recorded by his receiver-general including such purchases as his personal privy seat. In spite of his years of fighting there, however, he had never received any lands or titles based on conquest (although he did manage to sell a large number of French prisoners to Lord Fanhope). Equally affecting his English estates was that substantial dowers were still in the hands of his mother and sister-in-law, Lady Constance Holland (1387–1437) (his brother's widow, and daughter of John Holland, 1st Duke of Exeter). As K.B. McFarlane put it, his estate was "both wasted and encumbered" from the moment he came into possession On his mother's death, however, in 1425, Mowbray received her dower estates concentrated in East Anglia, centred around Framlingham Castle, which he took over, and secured his recognition as duke of Norfolk.

Although he seems never to have been a particularly active Councillor to the King, he nevertheless received 300 marks payment a year for the office, and indeed, even on his deathbed, he was still owed a portion of £1,300 arrears from the government in salary. He had, however, been the first Mowbray to gain possession of the Brotherton and Seagrave estates that had been in the possession of his great-grandmother, Margaret of Brotherton, Duchess of Norfolk, who had died in 1399; and he has been described, after his mother's death, as representing "a new nobility" in East Anglia, alongside the Duke of Suffolk. The Brotherton lands particularly have been described as having political potential due to their being a large new conglomerate of estates in a whole new area of influence. As these lands were concentrated in East Anglia, for the first time, a Mowbray Duke of Norfolk had substantially expanded his natural patrimony out of and away from Lincolnshire. The Brotherton lands were worth over £1,400 at the turn of the century, although by the time Mowbray had inherited it, he had two dowagers (the widows of his brother and father) to support out of his income, and they were themselves relatively young

Thus, although he inherited a large estate in East Anglia, it has been estimated that only around half of it was under Mowbray's direct control. It may well be as a direct result of his lack of political significance in the region that even though he spent most of his career in France, on his visits home, he spent the majority of his time in London or Epworth, not the east of England.

=== Precedence and the dukedom of Norfolk ===
Throughout his life, Mowbray was obsessed with his "rights and privileges," even arguing with Henry V over the powers and extent of his office of Earl Marshal. His concern for establishing—and augmenting—his own authority was such that he was drawn in dispute with Richard Beauchamp, Earl of Warwick after claiming that his own earldom of Norfolk had precedence in the English peerage, and outranked that of Warwick. Mowbray first claimed precedence in 1414; the situation was not resolved until 1425 when the question was put to parliament. The House of Commons, as Archer puts it, was able to "neatly side-step" the issue by recommending that Mowbray be returned to his family dukedom.

A month later, on 14 July, John Mowbray paid homage to Henry VI as the second Mowbray Duke of Norfolk, which, says Griffiths, was intended to "soothe his offended dignity and quieten the discord". Having recently fought for the Duke of Gloucester in Brabant, Mowbray relied on the duke's support against Beauchamp, who was himself known to be part of Cardinal Beaufort's clique.

== Family ==
Mowbray married Lady Katherine Neville, daughter of Ralph Neville, 1st Earl of Westmorland, and had one son, John, born just before his father returned ill from France in 1415. Seventeen-year-old John Mowbray succeeded his father to the dukedom of Norfolk in October 1432, while Katherine lived for over fifty years more and married three more times.

Apart from his elder brother, John Mowbray had three sisters, Elizabeth, Margaret and Isabel. Because of Thomas' treason, the sisters had to be found husbands in severely straitened circumstances. Elizabeth married Michael de la Pole, 3rd Earl of Suffolk, although, as K. B. McFarlane noted, his family was, although later ducal, both "impoverished and discredited and also parvenu", they had no sons.

At some point between 1415 and 1420, Margaret married Sir Robert Howard; their son John was to be an important player in the Wars of the Roses. He was to be a close associate of Mowbray's son and heir and also close to King Richard III who was to grant Howard the dukedom of Norfolk in 1483. Isabel married twice: firstly to Sir Henry Ferrers of Groby ("heir of an ancient but minor lordly house") and latterly, to James Berkeley ("one of two claimants to the headship and depleted lands of another").

== Character ==
Mowbray's most recent biographer, Dr. Rowena Archer, has not overemphasised his positive qualities. She has described his contributions to the political weal as "at best routine, at worst half-hearted," and notes generally how little he went out of his way to actively participate in domestic politics. Most councils he attended were mostly focused on organising his foreign expeditions; in fact, he "did the minimum amount expected" of him in terms of the running of the country during the king's minority.

She does, however, note that being on friendly relations with both the Duke of Gloucester and Cardinal Beaufort as he was throughout the king's minority, he was active in keeping the peace and arbitrating between them on occasions during their periodic feud. Yet, if he kept the peace between those two men, he was perfectly capable of entering into his own feuds as he showed in November 1428, when he was in a violent dispute with the Earl of Huntingdon. This feud was virulent enough that both lords were removed from the Bedfordshire King’s Bench while the Duke of Gloucester personally investigated the "inveterate feud".

Political offices
Preceded by The Earl of Westmorland	Earl Marshal; 1412–1432	Succeeded by The Duke of Norfolk
Peerage of England
Forfeit Title last held by Thomas Mowbray I	Duke of Norfolk; 1425–1432	Succeeded by John Mowbray
Preceded by Thomas Mowbray II	Earl of Norfolk; Earl of Nottingham; 1405–1432	Succeeded by John Mowbray
