= David Bates (historian) =

20th and 21st-century British historian of the Middle Ages

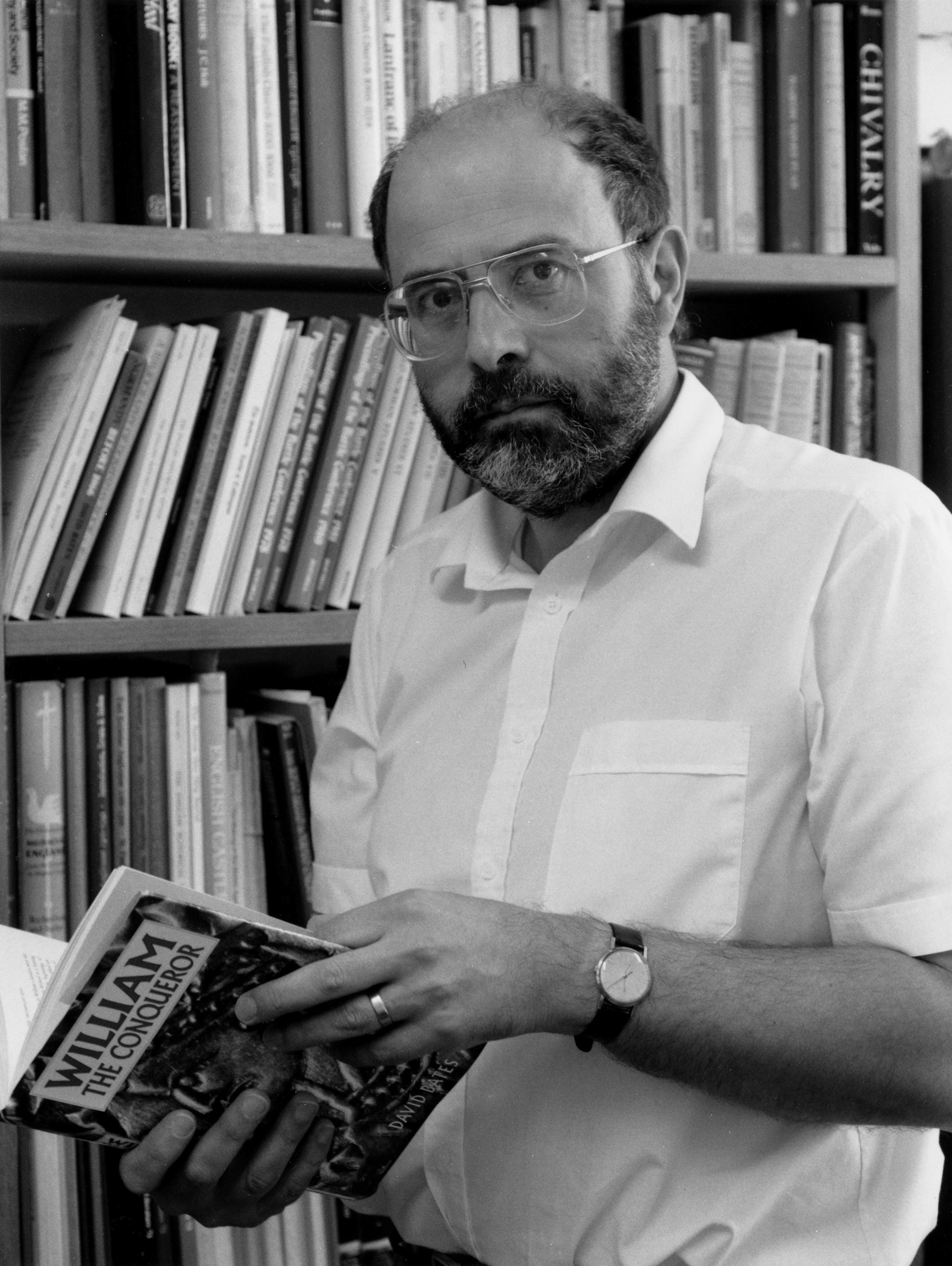
Bates in the 1980s

David Bates is a historian of Britain and France during the period from the tenth to the thirteenth centuries. He has written many books and articles during his career, including Normandy before 1066 (1982), Regesta Regum Anglo-Normannorum: The Acta of William I, 1066–1087 (1998), The Normans and Empire (2013), William the Conqueror (2016) in the Yale English Monarchs series (translated into French as Guillaume le Conquérant (2019)) and La Tapisserie de Bayeux (co-authored with Xavier Barral i Altet) (2019) (English translation 2024) .

== Education and career ==
- King Edward VI Grammar School, Nuneaton (1955–1963)
- University of Exeter (BA, 1966, and PhD, 1970)
- Archivist at the Imperial War Museum in London (1969–1971)
- Fellow of the University of Wales, University College, Cardiff (now the University of Cardiff) (1971–73). He remained there as lecturer, senior lecturer, reader, and professor until 1994.
- Edwards Professor of Medieval History at the University of Glasgow (1994–2003)
- Director of the Institute of Historical Research in the University of London (2003–08)
- Professor of Medieval History at the University of East Anglia (2008–2010). He is now Emeritus Professor there.
- Visiting Professorship at the University of Caen Normandie from 2009 to 2012
- The University of Caen Normandie awarded him an honorary doctorate (Docteur Honoris Causa) in 2000.

During this peripatetic career, he has held several positions that have involved responsibilities for the general development of his subject, such as Head of History and Welsh History in Cardiff, Head of the Department of Medieval History, Head of the School of History and Archaeology, and Head of History in Glasgow, and Director of the Centre of East Anglian Studies at the University of East Anglia. His time at the Institute of Historical Research, among other things, required that he animate public debate about History's role in British education and in public life and that he participate in delegations and projects that took him to Japan, Russia, Israel, and the United States.

== Publications ==
=== Books ===
The most important of his books are:

- Normandy before 1066 (London and New York, Longmans, 1982)
- A Bibliography of Domesday Book (Woodbridge, The Boydell Press, 1986)
- William the Conqueror (George Philip, 1989; reprinted, Tempus, 2001, 2004)
- Regesta Regum Anglo-Normannorum: The Acta of William I, 1066–1087 (Oxford, Clarendon Press, 1998)
- The Normans and Empire (Oxford, Oxford University Press, 2013)
- William the Conqueror (London and New Haven, Yale University Press, 2016). Translated into French as Guillaume le Conquérant (Paris, Flammarion, 2019)
- La Tapisserie de Bayeux (Paris: Citadelles & Mazenod, 2019). Co-authored with Xavier Barral i Altet).

The Normans and Empire argues for a new analytical framework for the expansion of the Normans in Western Europe and for the experience of the British Isles. William the Conqueror (Guillaume le Conquérant) proposes a radical revision of the life of William the Conqueror.

All of his books are based on extensive researches in the archives and libraries in France and Normandy that have uncovered a lot of new or inadequately known material, some of it published in Regum Anglo-Normannorum: The Acta of William I. He retains an interest in the interpretation of charters as literary sources and is currently working on a book on William the Conqueror's half-brother Odo, bishop of Bayeux and further innovative approaches to the history of northern Europe during the period from the tenth to the thirteenth century. A Festschrift has been published in his honour:

- Normandy and its Neighbours, 900-1250: Essays for David Bates, ed. David Crouch and Kathleen Thompson (Turnhout, Brepols, 2011).

He has co-edited a volume in honour of Professor Elisabeth van Houts, Lives, Identities and Histories in the Central Middle Ages, ed. Julie Barrau and David Bates (Cambridge, 2021).

=== Selected articles and publications ===
- ‘The Character and Career of Odo, Bishop of Bayeux, 1049/50-1097’, Speculum, 50 (1975), 1-20.
- ‘The Land Pleas of William I’s Reign: Penenden Heath Revisited’, Bulletin of the Institute of Historical Research, 51 (1978), 1–19.
- ‘The Earliest Norman Writs’, English Historical Review, 100 (1985), 266–84.
- ‘Normandy and England after 1066’, English Historical Review, 104 (1989), 851–80.
- Bishop Remigius of Lincoln 1067-1092 (Lincoln: The Honywood Press, 1992).
- ‘Les chartes de confirmation et pancartes normandes du règne de Guillaume le Conquérant’, in Pancartes monastiques des XI^{e} et XII^{e} siècles, ed. M. Parisse, P. Pégeot and B.-M. Tock (Turnhout, 1998), 95–109.
- ‘West Francia: The Northern Principalities, 900-1024’, in The New Cambridge Medieval History, vol. 3, c.900-c.1024, ed. T. Reuter (Cambridge, 1999), 398–419.
- ‘England and the “Feudal Revolution”’, in Il Feudalesimo nell’Alto Medioevo: Settimane di Studi del Centro Italiano di Studi sull’Alto Medioevo, 47 (2000), 611-49.
- ‘The Conqueror’s Adolescence’, in Anglo-Norman Studies: Proceedings of the Battle Conference (2002), 25 (2003), 1–18.
- ‘A Charter of William the Conqueror and Two of His Sons’, in Tabularia (http://www.unicaen.fr/mrsh/revue/tabularia) (2005).
- ‘The Representation of Queens and Queenship in Anglo-Norman Royal Charters’, in Frankland: The Franks and the World of the Early Middle Ages. Essays in Honour of Dame Jinty Nelson, ed. Paul Fouracre and David Ganz (Manchester, 2008), 285–303.
- ‘Autour de l’année 1047 : un acte de Guillaume, comte d’Arques, pour Fécamp (18 juillet 1047)’, in De part et d’autre de la Normandie médiévale : Recueil d’études en hommage à François Neveux, ed. Pierre Bouet, Catherine Bougy, Bernard Garnier and Christophe Maneuvrier (Caen, 2009), 43-52 (with Pierre Bauduin)
- ‘Frank Barlow 1911-2009’, Proceedings of the British Academy, clxxi (2011), 3-24.
- ‘Anger, emotion and a biography of William the Conqueror’, in Gender and Historiography: Studies in the History of the Earlier Middle Ages in Honour of Pauline Stafford, ed. Janet L. Nelson, Susan Reynolds and Susan M. Johns (London, 2012), 21–33.
- ‘Robert of Torigni and the Historia Anglorum’, in The English and their Legacy, 900-1200: Essays in Honour of Ann Williams, ed. David Roffe (, 2012), 175–84.
- ‘The Abbey and the Norman Conquest: An Unusual Case?’, in Bury St Edmunds and the Norman Conquest, ed. Tom Licence (Woodbridge, 2014), 5-21.
- ‘Guillaume le Conquérant et les abbés anglais’, in Pierre Bauduin, Grégory Combalbert, Adrien Dubois, Bernard Garnier, and Christophe Maneuvrier (eds.), Sur les pas de Lanfranc, du Bec à Caen: Recueil d’études en homage à Véronique Gazeau, Cahiers des Annales de Normandie, no. 37 (Caen, 2018), 335–42.
- ‘Migration, Conquest, and Identity: England’s History in the Eleventh and Twelfth Centuries’, in Le Migrazioni nell’alto Medioevo: Settimane di Studio della Fondazione Italiano di Studi sull’Alto Medioevo, lxvi (2019), i, 305–35.
- ‘William the Conqueror and Wessex’, in Alexander Langlands and Ryan Lavelle (eds.), The Land of the English Kin: Essays in Honour of Professor Barbara Yorke (Leiden and Boston, Brill, 2020), 517–37.
- 'Lives, Identities and the Historians of the Normans', in Lives, Identities and Histories in the Central Middle Ages, ed. Julia Barrau and David Bates (Cambridge, 2021), 180-202.
- 'Epilogue: The Legacy of William the Conqueror and His Age Today', in The Cambridge Companion to the Age of William the Conqueror, ed. Benjamin Pohl (Cambridge, 2022), 310-20.
- 'Epilogue: Some Reflections', in Maritime Exchange and the Making of the Norman Worlds, ed. Philippa Byrne and Caitlin Ellis (Turnhout, 2023), 211-20.

=== Conference proceedings ===
Bates has always been committed to encouraging collaboration between scholars from different countries. While at the Institute of Historical Research he organised five annual Anglo-American conferences from 2004 to 2008 and several other major conferences. He was Director of the Battle Conference on Anglo-Norman Studies from 2010 to 2012.

In addition to the three volumes of Anglo-Norman Studies based on the Battle conferences he directed, he has edited or co-edited the following conference proceedings:-

- (with Anne Curry) England and Normandy in the Middle Ages (London, The Hambledon Press 1994)
- (with Elizabeth Hallam) Domesday Book (Tempus, 2001)
- (with Julia Crick and Sarah Hamilton) Writing Medieval Biography: Essays in Honour of Professor Frank Barlow (Woodbridge, The Boydell Press, 2006)
- (with Véronique Gazeau and Éric Anceau) Liens personnels, réseaux, solidarités en France et dans les îles britanniques (XIe -XXe siècle), (Paris, Publications de la Sorbonne, 2006)
- (with Robert Liddiard) East Anglia and its North Sea World in the Middle Ages (Woodbridge, The Boydell Press, 2013)
- (with Pierre Bauduin) 911–2011: Penser les mondes normands médiévaux: Actes du colloque international de Caen et Cerisy (29 septembre-2 octobre 2011) (Caen, Presses Universitaires de Caen, 2016)
- (with Edoardo D’Angelo, and Elisabeth van Houts) People, Texts and Artefacts: Cultural Transmission in the Medieval Norman Worlds (London, Institute of Historical Research, 2018)
- 1066 in Perspective (Leeds, Royal Armouries, 2018)

== Honours ==
- Fellow of the Royal Historical Society,
- Fellow of the Society of Antiquaries of London
- Centenary Fellow of the Historical Association,
- Member of the Academy of Europe
- Fellow of the Royal Society of Arts.
- Honorary fellow of the Institute of Historical Research,
- *Life Member of Clare Hall in the University of Cambridge,
- Vice-president of the Dugdale Society,
- President of the Battle and District Historical Society from 2019.
- La Tapisserie de Bayeux (co-authored with Xavier Barral i Altet) was awarded ‘Le Prix SNA du Livre d’Art 2020’ by the Syndicat National des Antiquaires in October 2020.

=== Visiting positions and fellowships ===
- A Huntington Library Fellowship at the Henry E. Huntington Library, Pasadena, California (November–December 1984)
- A Visiting Professorship at the Ecole Nationale des Chartes in Paris (April–May 1999)
- A British Academy Marc Fitch Research Readership (October 2001 – September 2003)
- A Visiting Fellow Commonership at Trinity College, Cambridge (October 2002 – March 2003)
- Directeur d'Etudes Invité at the Ecole Pratique des Hautes Etudes in Paris (May 2003)
- Visiting professor at the University of Caen Normandie (2009–2012) as holder of a 'Chaire d'Excellence' funded by the then Région de la Basse-Normandie.
- A Leverhulme Trust Emeritus Fellowship (2013–2015)

=== Public lectures ===
Bates has given many talks and lectures at universities and historical societies, many of them to branches of the Historical Association, of which he is a committed supporter.

Major lectures which have led to publications are:-

- The Stenton Lecture at the University of Reading (1999). Reordering the Past and Negotiating the Present in Stenton’s ‘First Century’ (Stenton Lecture, University of Reading, 2000).
- The R. Allen Brown Memorial Lecture (2002) at the Battle Conference. ‘The Conqueror’s Adolescence’, in Anglo-Norman Studies: Proceedings of the Battle Conference (2002), 25 (2003), pp. 1–18.
- The Henry Loyn Memorial Lecture (2006) at Cardiff University. ‘William the Conqueror and His Wider Western World’, Haskins Society Journal, 15 (2006, for 2004), pp. 73–87.
- The James W. Ford Lectures in British History at the University of Oxford (2010). The Normans and Empire (Oxford, Oxford University Press, 2013).

== Professional contributions ==
As Director of the Institute of Historical Research from 2003 to 2008, Bates held one of the most important posts in the UK historical profession. He has always been committed to making a contribution to making History accessible to as wide a public as possible and to organising conferences and producing edited volumes. In addition to what is mentioned above, he was, for example, the founding editor of the Longmans/Pearson Medieval World series from 1987 to 2001, thereby encouraging publications by many other scholars. Twenty-four books were published during this period and many are still in print. He contributed all the pre-1066 entries to The History Today Companion to British History, ed. Juliet Gardiner and Neil Wenborn (London: Collins & Brown, 1995) and to The History Today Who’s Who in British History, ed. Juliet Gardiner (London: Collins & Brown, 2000). He has also published extensively in France. He is currently working on more publications relating to the history of Britain and France during the period from the tenth to the thirteenth centuries.
