= Andrew Trollope =

English soldier

Sir Andrew Trollope
- Died: 29 March 1461 Near Towton, Yorkshire, England
- Conflicts: Hundred Years' War; Wars of the Roses; Rout of Ludford Bridge; Battle of Worksop; Battle of Wakefield; Second Battle of St Albans; Battle of Towton †

Arms of Sir Andrew Trollope.

Sir Andrew Trollope (died 29 March 1461) was an English professional soldier who fought in the Hundred Years' War and the Wars of the Roses.

== Biography ==
Born into a family of Durham dyers, Trollope began his long military career in France in the 1420s as a man-at-arms, serving first on Tombelaine under Thomas Burgh and then with the garrisons at Fresnay-le-Vicomte and Caen under John Fastolf in the Duke of Somerset's raid into Picardy in February 1440. Trollope served in Matthew Gough's company. By 1442, he was lieutenant at Fresnay under Richard Woodville and held the same position under Osbert Mundeford when he surrendered the castle to the French in 1450.

Sometime before 1455, he married Elizabeth, sister of Osbert Mundeford (a protégé of the Beaufort family, who became treasurer-general of the duchy of Normandy in September 1448), and this connection allowed Trollope to prosper in his military career. By 1455, Trollope was made Master Porter of Calais, a capacity in which he continued to serve until 1459. It was in this office that he prevented pirates and French ships alike from sailing, but also seized and stole from "the ships of allies and subjects alike" to such an extent that he has been called a "freebooter".

Shortly before the confrontation at Ludford Bridge, Trollope sailed for England with Richard Neville, 16th Earl of Warwick known as (the "Kingmaker"). At the Rout of Ludford Bridge Trollope commanded part of the Yorkist army of Richard of York, 3rd Duke of York, but he defected to King Henry VI's side bringing with him 600 men and "valuable intelligence" regarding York's army.

Trollope returned to France with Henry Beaufort, 3rd Duke of Somerset to aid in the capture of Calais. Somerset failed to achieve this, but Trollope did persuade the garrison of Guînes to come over to the Lancastrians, and was appointed bailiff of Guînes on 24 March and expected to defend it. However, Somerset's defeat at the Battle of Newenham Bridge (Pont de Nieulay) on 23 April and the failure of Mundeford to supply a relief force (it was intercepted at the port of Sandwich in June) forced Trollope to surrender Guînes to the Yorkists shortly afterwards, and he then returned to England.

Trollope proved to be an invaluable strategist to Margaret of Anjou. He took part in the ambush at the Battle of Worksop on York's march north in December 1460 and then supposedly devised the Lancastrian plan at the Battle of Wakefield, where York and Richard Neville, 5th Earl of Salisbury were killed. Andrew Trollope also fought at the Second Battle of St Albans (where he stepped on a caltrop) and was knighted by Prince Edward.

His importance to the Lancastrian cause can be seen by the fact that, in March 1461, the recently proclaimed King Edward IV offered a £100 reward to anyone who killed "certain named enemies of the House of York", which included Trollope.

At the Battle of Towton (29 March 1461) Trollope shared the command of the Lancastrian vanguard with Henry Percy, 3rd Earl of Northumberland, against the Yorkist army of Edward IV. Considered the "opposite number" of his contemporary William Neville, 1st Earl of Kent, Trollope's death in the battle was "a damaging blow" for the future of the Lancastrian cause. He was posthumously attainted, and his son David Trollope was also killed at Towton.

== Family ==
Trollope and his wife, Elizabeth Mundeford, had a daughter who became Margaret Calle when she married Richard Calle of Bacton, bailiff of the Pastons. Richard Calle had previously been married to Margery Paston, which had caused a famous rift in the Paston family. The Bishop was called but he could not annul the marriage so the couple were banished. The daughter was not forgiven but Richard was in time re-employed.
