= Battle of Towton =

1461 battle in the Wars of the Roses

- Part of the Wars of the Roses
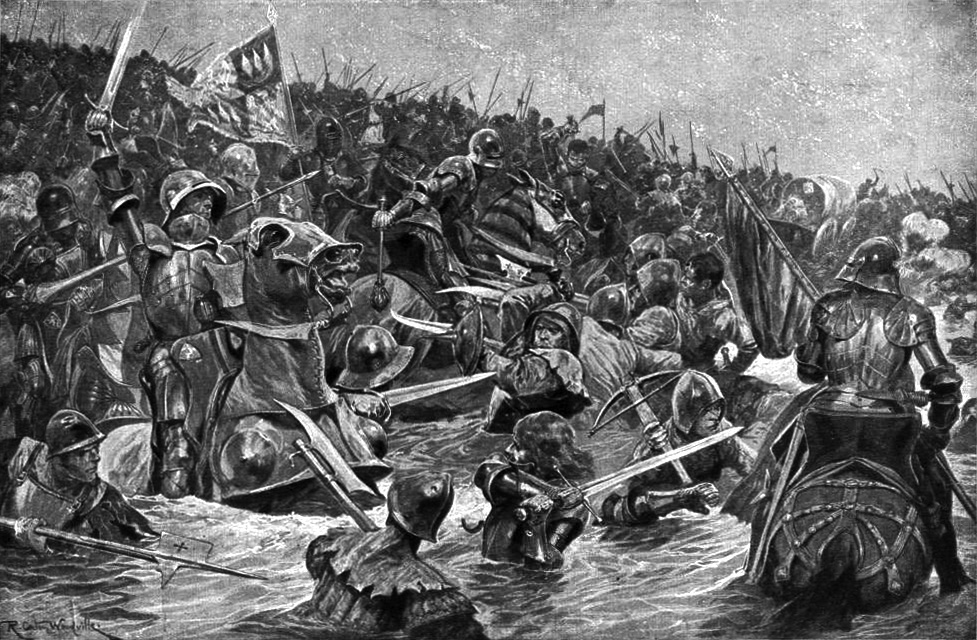
- The Battle of Towton (1922)
Date	29 March 1461
Location	Near Towton, Yorkshire, England 53°50′23″N 1°16′06″W
Result	Yorkist victory

Belligerents
House of York	House of Lancaster

Commanders and leaders
Edward IV; Earl of Warwick; Baron Fauconberg; Duke of Norfolk	Duke of Somerset; Duke of Exeter (WIA); Earl of Northumberland † Sir Andrew Trollope †

Strength
- 50,000 on each side (Note: Contemporary sources claim over 100,000 on each side, modern estimates suggest 75,000 in total as the upper limit, over 3% of the English population at the time)

Casualties and losses
3,000 to 4,500 dead (Note: Based on total casualties of 9,000 to 13,000, 1/3 Yorkist)	6,000 to 8,500 dead

The Battle of Towton took place on 29 March 1461 during the Wars of the Roses, near Towton in North Yorkshire. Yorkist forces decisively defeated Lancastrian supporters of Henry VI, securing the English throne for Edward IV. Fought for ten hours between an estimated 50,000 soldiers from both sides in a snowstorm on Palm Sunday, it was "probably the largest and bloodiest battle on English soil."

Henry VI succeeded his father, Henry V, when he was nine months old in 1422, but was a weak, ineffectual and mentally unsound ruler, which encouraged the nobles to scheme for control over him. The situation deteriorated in the 1450s into a civil war between his Beaufort relatives and his wife, Queen Margaret, on one side, with those of his cousin Richard, Duke of York, on the other.

In October 1460, Parliament named York as Henry's successor, but the Lancastrians refused to accept the disinheritance of Edward of Westminster, Prince of Wales. In December, their army defeated and killed York at Wakefield. His eldest son Edward now declared himself king, and marched north with his own forces. On reaching the battlefield, the Yorkists found themselves heavily outnumbered, since levies under the Duke of Norfolk had yet to arrive. However, Yorkist archers under Lord Fauconberg took advantage of the strong wind to outrange their enemies, provoking the Lancastrians into abandoning their defensive positions. The ensuing combat lasted hours, exhausting the combatants. The arrival of Norfolk's men reinvigorated the Yorkists who routed their foes.

Many Lancastrians were killed while fleeing, with several high-ranking prisoners executed, while Henry fled the country, leaving Edward to rule England. In 1929, the Towton Cross was erected on the battlefield to commemorate the event. Various archaeological remains and mass graves related to the battle have been found in the area.

== Setting ==
Locations:

– Battle of Towton; – other battles; – other places

In 1461 England was in the sixth year of the Wars of the Roses, a series of civil wars between the houses of York and Lancaster over the English throne. The Lancastrians backed the reigning king of England, Henry VI, a weak and indecisive man who suffered from intermittent bouts of madness. The leader of the Yorkists was initially Richard, Duke of York, who resented the dominance of a small number of aristocrats favoured by the king, principally the king's close relatives, the Beaufort family. Fuelled by rivalries between influential supporters of both factions, York's attempts to displace Henry's favourites from power led to war. After capturing Henry at the Battle of Northampton in 1460, the duke, who was of royal blood, issued his claim to the throne. Even York's closest supporters among the nobility were reluctant to usurp the dynasty; the nobles passed by a majority vote the Act of Accord, which ruled that the duke and his heirs would succeed to the throne upon Henry's death.

Henry VI's wife, Queen Margaret, refused to accept an arrangement that deprived their son, Edward of Westminster, of his birthright. She had fled to Scotland after the Yorkist victory at Northampton; there she began raising an army, promising her followers the freedom to plunder on the march south through England. Her Lancastrian supporters also mustered in the north of England, preparing for her arrival. York marched with his army to meet this threat but he was lured into a trap at the battle of Wakefield and killed. The duke and his second son, Edmund, Earl of Rutland, were decapitated by the Lancastrians and their heads were impaled on spikes atop the Micklegate Bar, a gatehouse of the city of York. The leadership of the House of York passed to the duke's heir, Edward.

The armies of York (white) and Lancaster (red) move towards Towton.

The victors of Wakefield were joined by Margaret's army and marched south, plundering settlements along the way. They liberated Henry after defeating the Yorkist army of Richard Neville, Earl of Warwick, in the second battle of St Albans and continued pillaging on their way to London. The city of London refused to open its gates to Henry and Margaret for fear of being looted. The Lancastrian army was short of supplies and had no adequate means to replenish them. When Margaret learned that Richard of York's eldest son, Edward, Earl of March, and his army had won the battle of Mortimer's Cross in Herefordshire and were marching towards London, she withdrew the Lancastrians to York. Warwick and the remnants of his army marched from St Albans to join Edward's men and the Yorkists were welcomed into London. Having lost custody of Henry, the Yorkists needed a justification to continue the rebellion against the king and his Lancastrian followers. On 4 March Warwick proclaimed the young Yorkist leader as King Edward IV. The proclamation gained greater acceptance than Richard of York's earlier claim, as several nobles opposed to letting Edward's father ascend the throne viewed the Lancastrian actions as a betrayal of the legally established Accord.

The country now had two kings; a situation that could not be allowed to persist, especially if Edward were to be formally crowned. Edward offered an amnesty to any Lancastrian supporter who renounced Henry. The move was intended to win over the commoners; his offer did not extend to wealthy Lancastrians (mostly the nobles). The young king summoned and ordered his followers to march towards York to take back his family's city and to depose Henry formally through force of arms. The Yorkist army moved along three routes. Warwick's uncle, Lord Fauconberg, led a group to clear the way to York for the main body, which was led by Edward. The Duke of Norfolk was sent east to raise forces and rejoin Edward before the battle. Warwick's group moved to the west of the main body, through the Midlands, gathering men as they went. On 28 March, the leading elements of the Yorkist army came upon the remains of the crossing in Ferrybridge crossing the River Aire. They were rebuilding the bridge when they were attacked and routed by a band of about 500 Lancastrians, led by Lord Clifford.

Learning of the encounter, Edward led the main Yorkist army to the bridge and was forced into a gruelling battle: although the Yorkists were superior in numbers, the narrow bridge was a bottleneck, forcing them to confront Clifford's men on equal terms. Edward sent Fauconberg and his horsemen to ford the river at Castleford, which should have been guarded by Henry, Earl of Northumberland, but he arrived late, by which time the Yorkists had crossed the ford and were heading to attack the Lancastrians at Ferrybridge from the flank. The Lancastrians retreated but were chased to Dinting Dale, where they were all killed, Clifford being slain by an arrow to his throat.

Having cleared the vicinity of enemy forces, the Yorkists repaired the bridge and pressed onwards to camp overnight at Sherburn-in-Elmet. The Lancastrian army marched to Tadcaster, about 2 miles (3.2 km) north of Towton, and made camp. As dawn broke the two rival armies struck camp under dark skies and strong winds. Although it was Palm Sunday, a day of holy significance to Christians, the forces prepared for battle and a few documents named the engagement the battle of Palme Sonday Felde but the name did not gain wide acceptance. Popular opinion favoured naming the battle after the village of Towton because of its proximity and it being the most prominent feature in the area.

== Force compositions ==
The armies gathered at Towton were among the largest at the time. Contemporary sources (like Gregory's Chronicle) claimed that the soldiers on each side numbered in the hundreds of thousands. These figures are thought to be exaggerated, and modern historians believe that a combined figure of 50,000 – 65,000 is more likely, between one and two per cent of the English population at the time. An analysis of 50 skeletons found in mass graves between 1996 and 2003 showed most were 24 to 30 years old and many were veterans of previous engagements.

Henry's physical and mental frailty was a major weakness for the Lancastrian cause, and he remained in York with Margaret. In contrast the 18-year-old Edward was a tall and imposing sight in armour and led from the front: his preference for bold offensive tactics determined the Yorkist plan of action for this engagement. His presence and example were crucial to ensuring the Yorkists held together through the long and exhausting struggle.

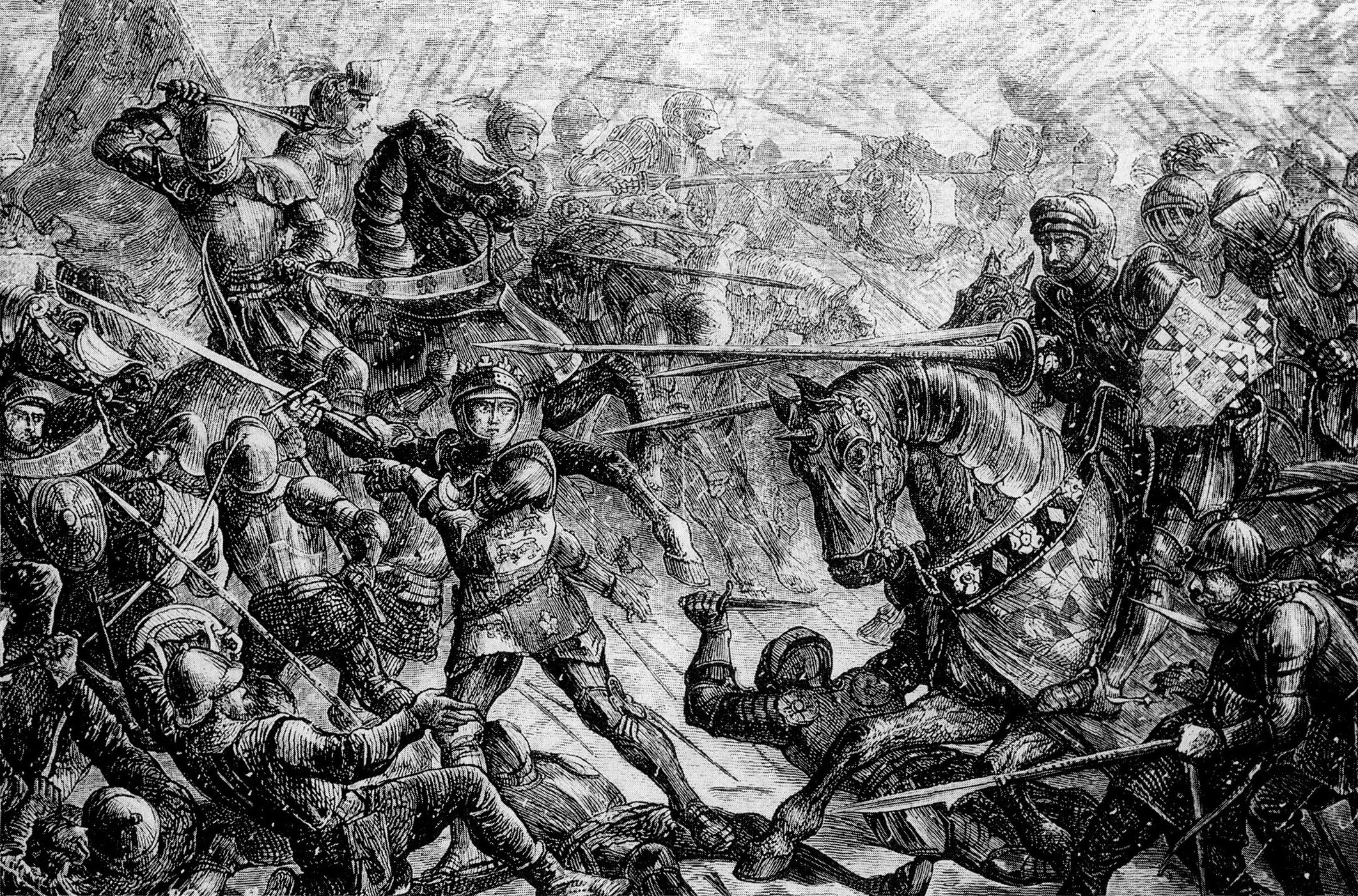
Edward's presence was crucial to Yorkist victory.

Approximately three-quarters of English peers fought in the battle; eight were with the Yorkist army, whereas the Lancastrians had at least nineteen.

Of the other Yorkist leaders, Warwick was absent from the battle, having suffered a leg wound at Ferrybridge. Norfolk's contingent was commanded by Walter Blount and Robert Horne; this may have been an advantage, since he was regarded as an unpredictable ally. Edward relied heavily on Warwick's uncle, Lord Fauconberg, a veteran of the Anglo-French wars, highly regarded by contemporaries for his military skills. He demonstrated this in a wide range of roles, having captained the Calais garrison, led naval piracy expeditions in the Channel, and commanded the Yorkist vanguard at Northampton.

The senior Lancastrian general was Henry Beaufort, Duke of Somerset, an experienced leader credited with victories at Wakefield and St Albans, although others suggest they were due to Sir Andrew Trollope. Trollope was an extremely experienced and astute commander, who had served under Warwick in Calais, before defecting to the Lancastrians at Ludford Bridge in 1459. Other notable Lancastrian leaders included Henry Holland, Duke of Exeter, and northern magnates the Earl of Northumberland, Lord de Ros and Lord Dacre. Another leading Lancastrian, Lord Clifford, had been killed by an arrow in the throat at Ferrybridge.

== Deployment ==
Initial deployments: the Yorkists (white) and Lancastrians (red) at Towton

Very few historical sources give detailed accounts of the battle and they do not describe the exact deployments of the armies. The paucity of such primary sources led early historians to adopt Hall's chronicle as their main resource for the engagement, despite its authorship 70 years after the event and questions over the origin of his information. The Burgundian chronicler Jean de Waurin was a more contemporary source, but his chronicle was made available to the public only from 1891, and several mistakes in it discouraged historians at that time from using it. Later reconstructions of the battle were based on Hall's version, supplemented by minor details from other sources.

The battle took place on a plateau between the villages of Saxton (to the south) and Towton (to the north). The region was agricultural land, with plenty of wide open areas and small roads on which to manoeuvre the armies. Two roads ran through the area: the Old London Road, which connected Towton to the English capital, and a direct road between Saxton and Towton. The steeply banked Cock Beck flowed in an S-shaped course around the plateau from the north to west. The plateau was bisected by the Towton Dale, which ran from the west and extended into the North Acres in the east. Woodlands were scattered along the beck; Renshaw Woods lined the river on the north-western side of the plateau, and south of Towton Dale, Castle Hill Wood grew on the west side of the plateau at a bend in the beck. The area to the north-east of this forest would be known as Bloody Meadow after the battle.

According to Gravett and fellow military enthusiast Trevor James Halsall, Somerset's decision to engage the Yorkist army on this plateau was sound. Defending the ground just before Towton would block any enemy advance towards the city of York, whether they moved along the London – Towton road or an old Roman road to the west. The Lancastrians deployed on the north side of the dale, using the valley as a "protective ditch"; the disadvantage of this position was that they could not see beyond the southern ridge of the dale. The Lancastrian flanks were protected by marshes; their right was further secured by the steep banks of the Cock Beck. The width of their deployment area did not allow for a longer front line, depriving the Lancastrians of the opportunity to use their numerical superiority. Waurin's account gave rise to the suggestion that Somerset ordered a force of mounted spearmen to conceal itself in Castle Hill Wood, ready to charge into the Yorkist left flank at an opportune time in battle.

The Yorkists appeared as the Lancastrians finished deployment. Line after line of soldiers crested the southern ridge of the dale and formed up in ranks opposite their enemies as snow began to fall. Edward's army was outnumbered and Norfolk's troops had yet to arrive to join them. The Yorkist vanguard was commanded by Lord Fauconberg. Hall names John Wenlock and John Dinham and others as commanders of the Yorkist rearguard. Sources variously mention the Duke of Somerset, Trollope, the Earl of Northumberland and the Duke of Exeter as the commanders of the Lancastrian host, but show little agreement as to which portion of the host each of them was assigned.

== Fighting ==
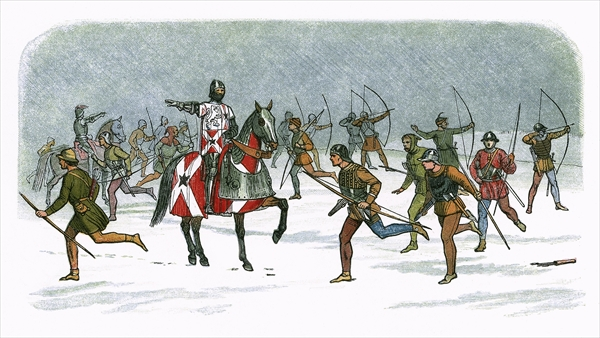
Yorkist leader William Neville (on horse) and his archers took advantage of the wind to inflict early damage on the Lancastrians – 19th century drawing

As Somerset was content to stand and let his foes come to him, the opening move of the battle was made by the Yorkists. Noticing the direction and strength of the wind, Fauconberg ordered all Yorkist archers to step forward and unleash a volley of their arrows from what would be the standard maximum range of their longbows. With the wind behind them, the Yorkist missiles travelled farther than usual, plunging deep into the masses of soldiers on the hill slope.

The response from the Lancastrian archers was ineffective as the heavy wind blew snow in their faces. They found it difficult to judge the range and pick out their targets and their arrows fell short of the Yorkist ranks; Fauconberg had ordered his men to retreat after loosing one volley, thus avoiding any casualties. Unable to observe their results, the Lancastrians loosed their arrows until most had been used, leaving a thick, prickly carpet in the ground in front of the Yorkists.

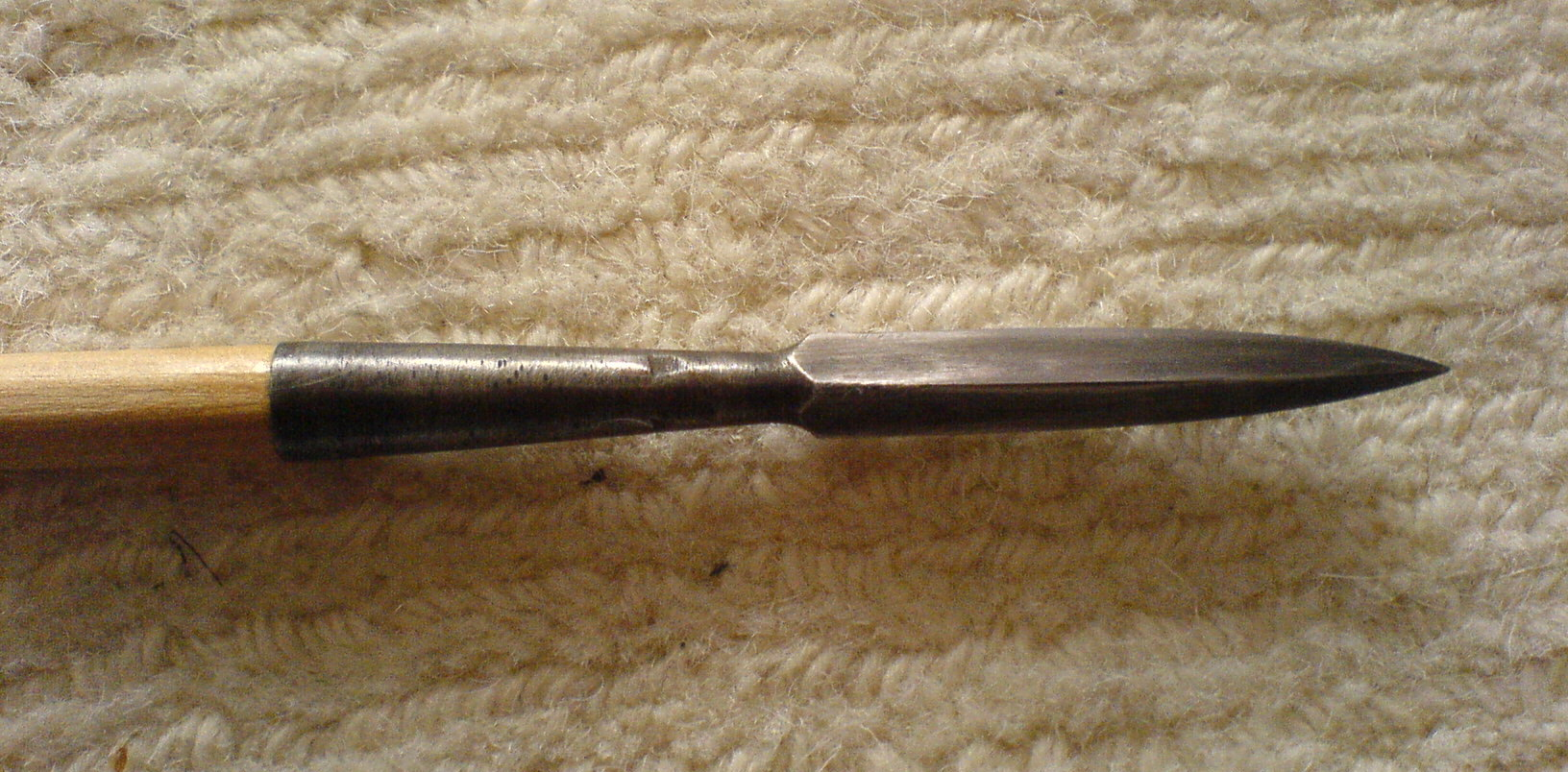
Bodkin arrows were among the missiles that killed many in the battle.

After the Lancastrians had ceased loosing their arrows, Fauconberg ordered his archers to step forward again to shoot. When they had exhausted their ammunition, the Yorkists plucked arrows off the ground in front of them — arrows loosed by their foes — and continued shooting. Coming under attack without any effective response of its own, the Lancastrian army moved from its position to engage the Yorkists in close combat. Seeing the advancing mass of men, the Yorkist archers shot a few more volleys before retreating behind their ranks of men-at-arms, leaving thousands of arrows in the ground to hinder the Lancastrian attack.

As the Yorkists reformed their ranks to receive the Lancastrian charge, their left flank came under attack by the horsemen from Castle Hill Wood mentioned by Waurin. The Yorkist left wing fell into disarray and several men started to flee. Edward had to take command of the left wing to save the situation. By engaging in the fight and encouraging his followers, his example inspired many to stand their ground. The armies clashed and archers shot into the mass of men at short range. The Lancastrians continuously threw fresher men into the fray and gradually the numerically inferior Yorkist army was forced to give ground and retreat up the southern ridge. Gravett thought that the Lancastrian left had less momentum than the rest of its formation, skewing the line of battle such that its western end tilted towards Saxton.

The fighting continued for three hours, according to research by English Heritage, a government body in charge of conservation of historic sites. It was indecisive until the arrival of Norfolk's men. Marching up the Old London Road, Norfolk's contingent was hidden from view until they crested the ridge and attacked the Lancastrian left flank. The Lancastrians continued to give fight but the advantage had shifted to the Yorkists. By the end of the day, the Lancastrian line had broken up, as small groups of men began fleeing for their lives. Polydore Vergil, chronicler for Henry VII of England, said combat lasted for a total of 10 hours.

== Rout ==
At the crucial moment, Norfolk's troops arrived, helping the Yorkists (white) overcome the Lancastrians (red).

The tired Lancastrians flung off their helmets and armour to run faster. Without such protection, they were much more vulnerable to the attacks of the Yorkists. Norfolk's troops were much fresher and faster. Fleeing across what would later become known as Bloody Meadow, many Lancastrians were cut down from behind or were slain after they had surrendered. Before the battle, both sides had issued the order to give no quarter and the Yorkists were in no mood to spare anyone after the long, gruelling fight. A number of Lancastrians, such as Trollope, also had substantial bounties on their heads. Gregory's chronicle stated 42 knights were killed after they were taken prisoner.

Archaeological findings in the late 20th century shed light on the final moments of the battle. In 1996 workmen at a construction site in the village of Towton uncovered a mass grave, which archaeologists believed to contain the remains of men who were slain during or after the battle in 1461. The bodies showed severe injuries to their upper torsos; arms and skulls were cracked or shattered. One exhumed specimen, known as Towton 25, had the front of his skull bisected: a weapon had slashed across his face, cutting a deep wound that split the bone. The skull was also pierced by another deep wound, a horizontal cut from a blade across the back.

The Lancastrians lost more troops in their rout than from the battlefield. Men struggling across the Cock Beck were dragged down by currents and drowned. Those floundering were stepped on and pushed under water by their comrades behind them as they rushed to get away from the Yorkists. As the Lancastrians struggled across the beck Yorkist archers rode to high vantage points and shot arrows at them. The dead began to pile up and the chronicles state that the Lancastrians eventually fled across these "bridges" of bodies. The chase continued northwards across the River Wharfe, which was larger than Cock Beck. A bridge over the river collapsed under the flood of men and many drowned trying to cross. Those who hid in Tadcaster and York were hunted down and killed.

A newsletter dated 4 April 1461 reported a widely circulated figure of 28,000 casualties in the battle, which Charles Ross and other historians believe was exaggerated. The number was taken from the heralds' estimate of the dead and appeared in letters from Edward and the Bishop of Salisbury, Richard Beauchamp. Letters from an ambassador and a merchant from the duchy of Milan broke this number down into 8,000 dead for the Yorkists and 20,000 for the Lancastrians; in contrast, bishops Nicholas O'Flanagan (Elphin) and Francesco Coppini reported only 800 dead Yorkists. Other contemporary sources gave higher numbers, ranging from 30,000 to 38,000; Hall quoted an exact figure of 36,776. An exception was the Annales rerum anglicarum, which stated the Lancastrians had 9,000 casualties, an estimate Ross and Wolffe found to be more believable. A more recent analysis of the sources and archaeological evidence, which posits that accounts of Towton were combined with those of the actions of Ferrybridge and Dintingdale, suggests total casualty figures in the range 2,800 – 3,800.

The Lancastrian nobility sustained heavy losses. The Earl of Northumberland, lords Welles, Mauley and Dacre, and Sir Andrew Trollope fell in battle, while the earls of Devon and Wiltshire were afterwards taken and executed. Lord Dacre was said to have been killed by an archer who was perched in a "bur tree" (a local term for an elder). In contrast, the Yorkists lost only one notable member of the gentry, Horne, at Towton.

== Aftermath ==
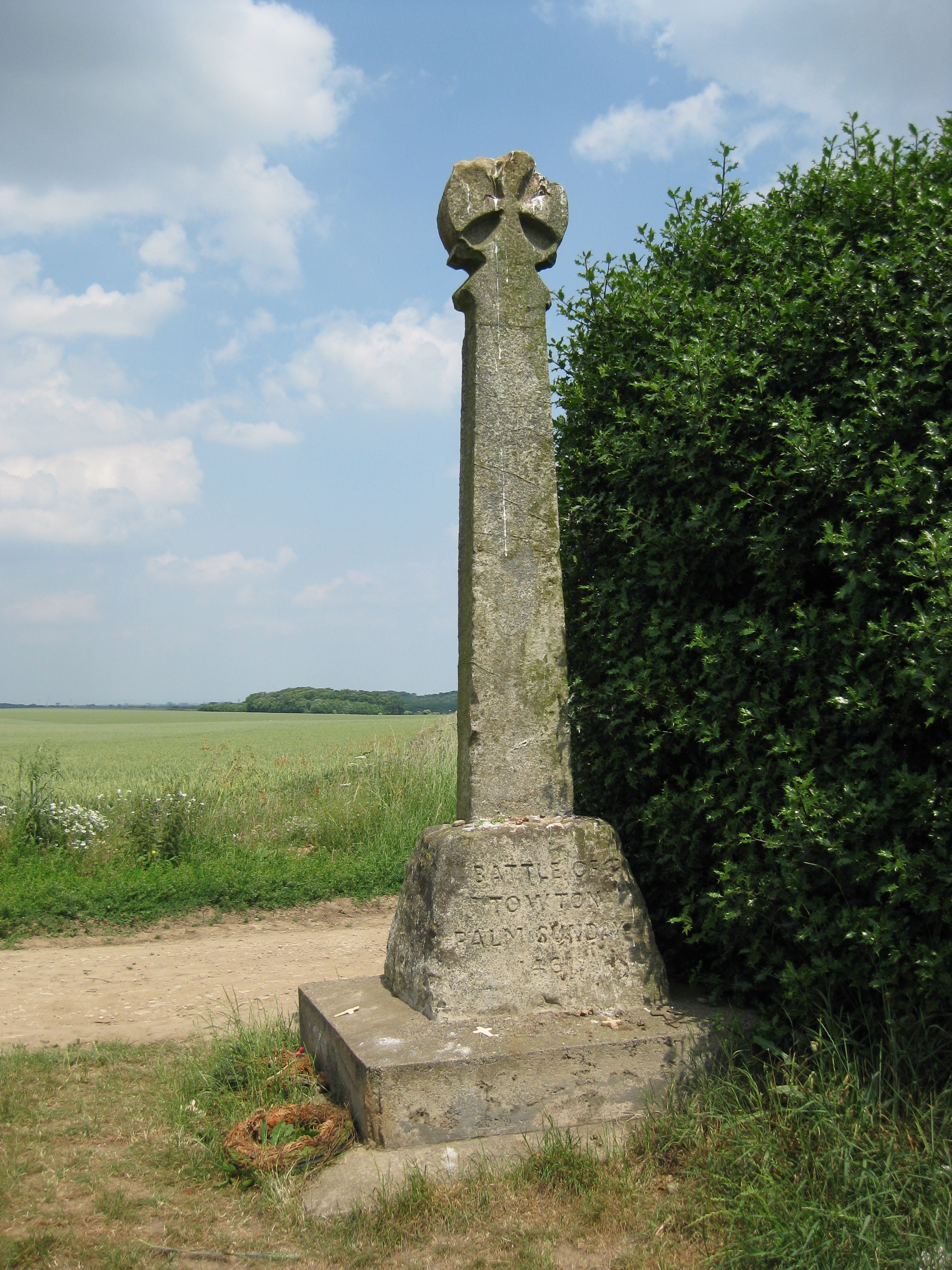
Towton Cross: a memorial for the Battle of Towton

On receiving news of his army's defeat, Henry fled into exile in Scotland with his wife and son. They were later joined by Somerset, Ros, Exeter, and the few Lancastrian nobles who escaped from the battlefield. The battle of Towton severely reduced the power of the House of Lancaster in England; the linchpins of their power at court (Northumberland, Clifford, Ros, and Dacre) had either died or fled the country, ending the house's domination over the north of England. Edward further exploited the situation, naming 14 Lancastrian peers as traitors. Approximately 96 Lancastrians of the rank of knight and below were also attainted, twenty-four of them Members of Parliament.

The new king preferred winning over his enemies to his cause; the nobles he attainted either died in the battle or had refused to submit to him. The estates of a few of these nobles were confiscated by the crown but the rest were untouched, remaining in the care of their families. Edward also pardoned many of those he attainted after they submitted to his rule.

Although Henry was at large in Scotland with his son, the battle put an end (for the time being) to disputes over the country's state of leadership since the Act of Accord. The English people were assured that there was now one true king: Edward. He turned his attention to consolidating his rule over the country, winning over the people and putting down the rebellions raised by the few remaining Lancastrian diehards. He knighted several of his supporters and elevated several of his gentry supporters to the peerage; Fauconberg was made the Earl of Kent. Warwick benefited from Edward's rule after the battle. He received parts of Northumberland's and Clifford's holdings, and was made "the king's lieutenant in the North and admiral of England." Edward bestowed on him many offices of power and wealth, further enhancing the earl's considerable influence and riches.

By 1464, the Yorkists had "wiped out all effective Lancastrian resistance in the north of England." Edward's reign was not interrupted until 1470; by then, his relationship with Warwick had deteriorated to such an extent that the earl defected to the Lancastrians and forced Edward to flee England, restoring Henry to the throne. The interruption of Yorkist rule was brief, as Edward regained his throne after defeating Warwick and his Lancastrian cohorts at the battle of Barnet in 1471.

== Literature ==
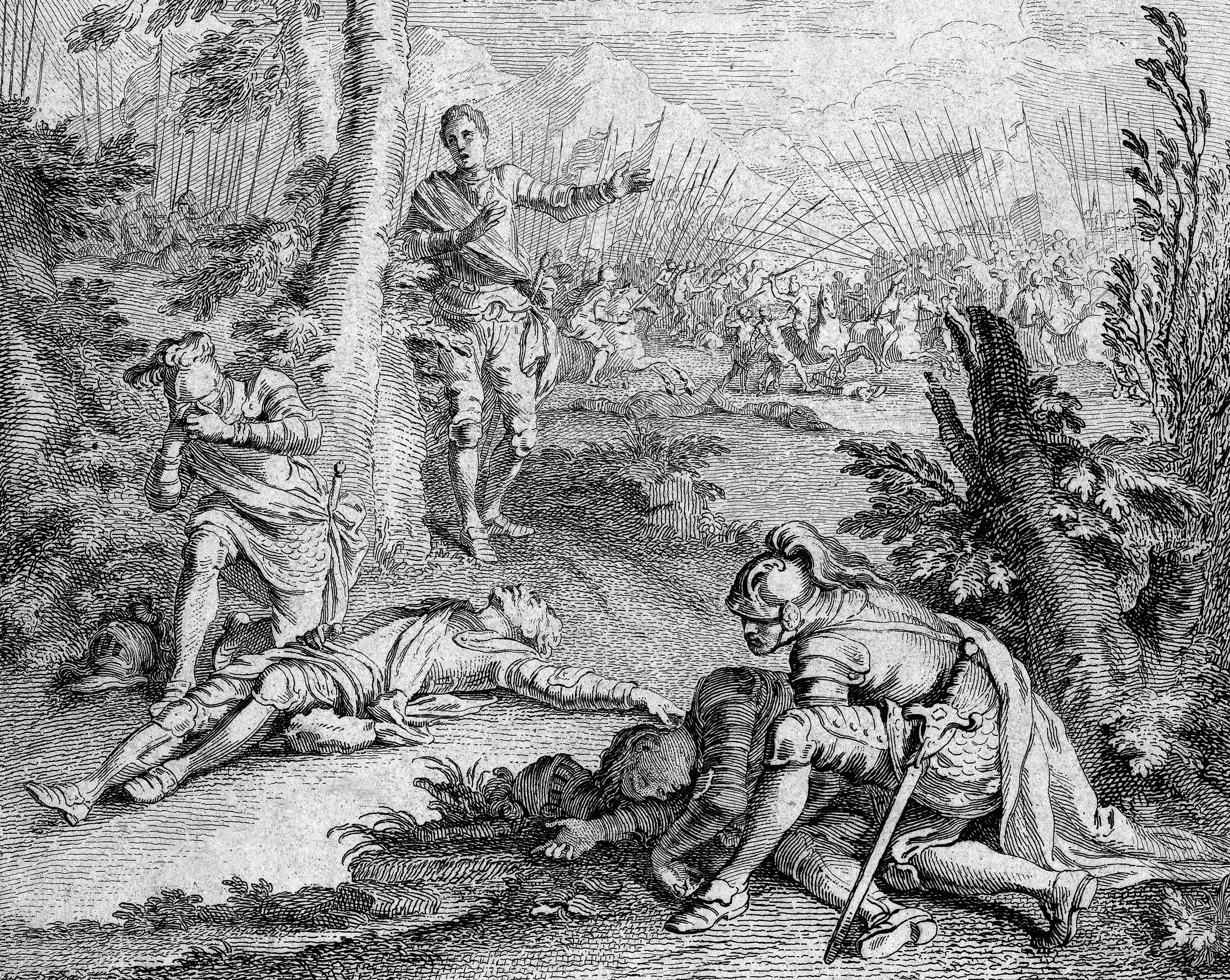
Shakespeare used the battle of Towton to illustrate the ills of civil war; in 3 Henry VI, Act 2, Scene 5, a father finds he has killed his son, while a son finds he has killed his own father.

In the sixteenth century William Shakespeare wrote a number of dramatisations of historic figures. The use of history as a backdrop, against which the familiar characters act out Shakespeare's drama, lends a sense of realism to his plays. Shakespeare wrote a three-part play about Henry VI, relying heavily on Hall's chronicle as a source. His vision of the battle of Towton (Henry VI, Part 3, Act 2, Scene 5), touted as the "bloodiest" engagement in the Wars of the Roses, became a set piece about the "terror of civil war, a national terror that is essentially familial". Historian Bertram Wolffe said it was thanks to Shakespeare's dramatisation of the battle that the weak and ineffectual Henry was at least remembered by English society, albeit for his pining to have been born a shepherd rather than a king.

Shakespeare's version of the battle presents a notable scene that comes immediately after Henry's soliloquy. Henry witnesses the laments of two soldiers in the battle. One slays his opponent in hope of plunder, only to find the victim is his son; the other kills his enemy, who turns out to be his father. Both killers have acted out of greed and fell into a state of deep grieving after discovering their misdeeds. Shakespearian scholar Arthur Percival Rossiter names the scene as the most notable of the playwright's written "rituals". The delivery of the event follows the pattern of an opera: after a long speech, the actors alternate among one another to deliver single-line asides to the audience. In this scene of grief, in a reversal of the approach adopted in his later historical plays, Shakespeare uses anonymous fictional characters to illustrate the ills of civil war while a historical king reflects on their fates. Michael Hattaway, emeritus professor of English Literature at the University of Sheffield, comments that Shakespeare intended to show Henry's sadness over the war, to elicit the same emotion among the audience and to expose Henry's ineptitude as king.

The battle of Towton was re-examined by Geoffrey Hill in his poem "Funeral Music" (1968). Hill presents the historical event through the voices of its combatants, looking at the turmoil of the era through their eyes. The common soldiers grouse about their physical discomforts and the sacrifices that they had made for the ideas glorified by their leaders. They share their superiors' determination to seek the destruction of their opponents, even at the cost of their lives. Hill depicts the participants' belief that the event was pre-destined and of utmost importance as a farce; the world went about its business regardless of the battle of Towton.

An episode in C. J. Sansom's 2006 historical novel Sovereign, set in 1541, eighty years after the battle, concerns a Towton farmer appealing to King Henry VIII to be compensated for the time and effort he has to spend on turning over to the Church the skeletons discovered nearly every day on his land.

== Legacy ==
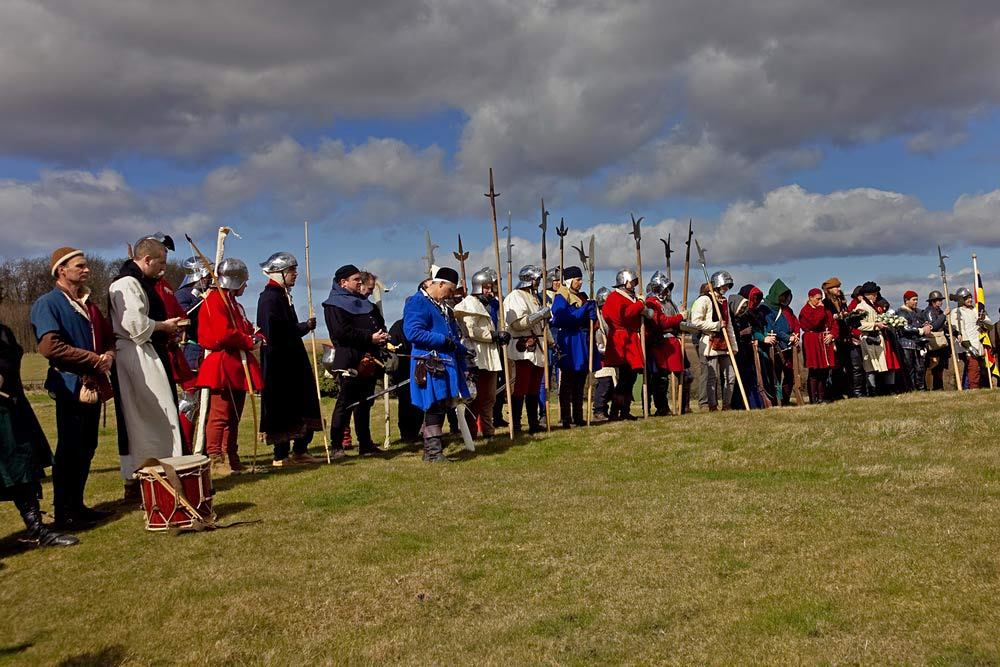
Re-enactors from the Towton Battlefield Society observe a moment of silence in memory of the dead of the battle.

Obtaining an accurate figure for casualties has been complicated: remains were either moved or used by farmers as fertiliser, and corpses were generally stripped of clothing and non-perishable items before burial. However some survived when later buildings were constructed over their graves; the first were uncovered in 1996 and excavations have so far uncovered more than 50 skeletons from the battle. An analysis of their injuries shows the brutality of the contest, including extensive post-mortem mutilations.

Some 15th-century documents confirm that there were casualties that had eventually been reburied in graveyards at Saxton and a chapel constructed for the purpose by Richard III in 1484. His death at the Battle of Bosworth in 1485 meant the building was never completed and eventually collapsed. In 1929 stones allegedly from the chapel were used to create the Towton Cross, also known as Lord Dacre's Cross, which commemorates those who died in the battle.

Lord Dacre was buried at the church of All Saints in Saxton and his tomb was reported in the late 19th century to be well maintained, although several of its panels had been weathered away. The tree from which Dacre's killer was supposed to have shot his arrow had been cut down by the late 19th century. In 2010 fragments from what are some of the earliest known handguns found in Britain were discovered on the battlefield.

Views of the Wars of the Roses in general and of the battle as a charnel house were formed by Shakespeare and endured for centuries. However at the start of the 21st century the battle was no longer prominent in the public consciousness. Journalists lamented that people were ignorant of the battle of Towton and of its significance. According to English Heritage the battle was of the "greatest importance": it was one of the largest, if not the largest, fought in England and resulted in the replacement of one royal dynasty by another. Hill expressed a different opinion. Although impressed with the casualty figures touted by the chroniclers, he believed the battle brought no monumental changes to the lives of the English people.

The Battle of Towton was associated with a tradition previously upheld in the village of Tysoe, Warwickshire. For several centuries a local farmer had scoured a hill figure, the Red Horse of Tysoe, each year, as part of the terms of his land tenancy. Although the origins of the tradition have never been conclusively identified, it was locally said this was done to commemorate the Earl of Warwick's inspirational deed of slaying his horse to show his resolve to stand and fight with the common soldiers. The tradition died in 1798 when the Tysoe Inclosure Act 1796 (36 Geo. 3. c. 31 Pr.) was implemented, redesignating the common land on which the equine figure was located as private property. The scouring was revived during the early 20th century but has since stopped.

== Sources ==
=== Books ===
- Berlin, Normand (2000) [1993]. O'Neill's Shakespeare. Michigan, United States: University of Michigan Press. doi:10.3998/mpub.14276. ISBN 978-0-472-10469-7.
- Brooke, Richard (1857). "The Field of the Battle of Towton". Visits to Fields of Battle in England. London, United Kingdom: John Russell Smith. pp. 81–129.
- Carpenter, Christine (2002) [1997]. The Wars of the Roses: Politics and the constitution in England, c. 1437–1509. New York, United States: Cambridge University Press. ISBN 978-0-521-31874-7.
- Edelman, Charles (1992). "The Wars of the Roses: 2 and 3 Henry VI, Richard III". Brawl Ridiculous: Swordfighting in Shakespeare's Plays. Manchester, United Kingdom: Manchester University Press. pp. 69–89. ISBN 978-0-7190-3507-4.
- Goodman, Anthony (19 July 1990) [1981]. "Local Revolts and Nobles' Struggles, 1469–71". The Wars of the Roses: Military Activity and English Society, 1452–97. London, United Kingdom: Routledge. pp. 66–85. ISBN 978-0-415-05264-1.
- Goodwin, George (2012). Fatal Colours: Towton 1461 - England's Most Brutal Battle. New York: W. W. Norton & Company. p. 288. ISBN 9780393080841.
- Gravett, Christopher (2003). Towton 1461: England's Bloodiest Battle (PDF). Campaign. Vol. 120. Oxford, UK: Osprey Publishing. ISBN 978-1-84176-513-6. Archived from the original (PDF) on 8 August 2013.
- Harriss, G.L. (2005). Shaping the Nation: England 1360–1461. New Oxford History of England. Oxford, UK: Clarendon Press. ISBN 978-0-19-822816-5.
- Hattaway, Michael & Shakespeare, William (1993). "The Play: 'What Should be the Meaning of All Those Foughten Fields?'". The Third Part of King Henry VI. Cambridge, United Kingdom: Cambridge University Press. pp. 9–35. ISBN 0-521-37705-6.
- Hicks, Michael (2002) [1998]. Warwick the Kingmaker. Oxford, United Kingdom: Blackwell Publishing. ISBN 0-631-23593-0.
- Markham, Clements (1906). "The Crowning Victory of Towton". Richard III: His Life and Character. London, United Kingdom: Smith, Elder & Co.
- Penn, Thomas (2019). The Brothers York. Allen Lane. ISBN 978-1846146909.
- Ross, Charles (1997) [1974]. Edward IV. English Monarchs series (revised ed.). New Haven, Connecticut: Yale University Press. ISBN 0-300-07372-0.
- Saccio, Peter (2000) [1977]. Shakespeare's English Kings: History, Chronicle, and Drama. Oxford, United Kingdom: Oxford University Press. ISBN 0-19-512319-0.
- Sadler, John (2011). Towton: The Battle of Palm Sunday Field 1461. Barnsley: Pen & Sword Military. ISBN 978-1-84415-965-9.
- Salzman, Louis Francis, ed. (1949). "Parishes – Tysoe". A History of the County of Warwick. Vol. 5. London, United Kingdom: Oxford University Press. pp. 175–182. Archived from the original on 10 September 2014.
- Santiuste, David (2010). Edward IV and the Wars of the Roses. Barnsley: Pen & Sword Military. ISBN 978-1-84415-930-7.
- Sherry, Vincent B. (1987). "King Log: Thorny Craft". The Uncommon Tongue: The Poetry and Criticism of Geoffrey Hill. Michigan, United States: University of Michigan Press. pp. 81–125. ISBN 0-472-10084-X.
- Wainwright, Jeffrey (2005). Acceptable Words: Essays on the Poetry of Geoffrey Hill. Manchester, United Kingdom: Manchester University Press. ISBN 0-7190-6754-5.
- Wolffe, Bertram (2001) [1981]. Henry VI. English Monarchs series (Yale ed.). New Haven, CT, US: Yale University Press. ISBN 978-0-300-08926-4.

=== Essays and journals ===
- Askew, H. (1 June 1935). "The Tysoe Red Horse". Notes and Queries (PDF, subscription required). 168. Oxford, United Kingdom: Oxford University Press: 394. doi:10.1093/nq/CLXVIII.jun01.394e. ISSN 1471-6941.
- Dean, Sidney (2015). "Bloody Sunday: The Battle of Towton". Medieval Warfare. 5 (3): 28–35. JSTOR 48578453.
- Fallow, Thomas McCall (January 1889). "The Dacre Tomb in Saxton Churchyard". The Yorkshire Archaeological and Topographical Journal. 10. London, United Kingdom: Yorkshire Archaeological and Topographical Association: 303–308.
- Fiorato, Veronica (2007). "The Context of the Discovery". Blood Red Roses: The Archaeology of a Mass Grave from the Battle of Towton AD 1461 (Second revised ed.). Oxford, United Kingdom: Oxbow. ISBN 978-1-84217-289-6.
- Gibson, Strickland (1936). "Francis Wise, B. D" (PDF). Oxoniensia. 1. Oxford, United Kingdom: Oxfordshire Architectural and Historical Society: 173–195. ISSN 0308-5562. Archived (PDF) from the original on 24 January 2021.
- Halsall, Trevor James (2000). "Geological Constraints on Battlefield Tactics: Examples in Britain from the Middle Ages to the Civil Wars". In Rose, Edward P. F.; Nathanail, C. Paul (eds.). Geology and Warfare: Examples of the Influence of Terrain and Geologists on Military Operations. Bath, United Kingdom: Geological Society of London. pp. 32–59. ISBN 1-86239-065-7.
- Harris, Mary Dormer (18 May 1935). "The Tysoe Red Horse". Notes and Queries. 168. Oxford, United Kingdom: Oxford University Press: 349. doi:10.1093/nq/CLXVIII.may18.349a. ISSN 1471-6941.
- Hinds, Allen B., ed. (1912). Calendar of State Papers and Manuscripts in the Archives and Collections of Milan 1385–1618. London: Stationery Office. Archived from the original on 12 November 2019.
- Morgan, Philip (2000). "The Naming of Battlefields in the Middle Ages". In Dunn, Diana (ed.). War and Society in Medieval and Early Modern. Liverpool, United Kingdom: Liverpool University Press. pp. 34–52. ISBN 0-85323-885-5.
- Ransome, Cyril (July 1889). "The Battle of Towton". The English Historical Review. 4: 460–466. doi:10.1093/ehr/IV.XV.460.
- Scott, Douglas Dowell (2010). "Military Medicine in the Pre-Modern Era: Using Forensic Techniques in the Archaeological Investigation of Military Remains". The Historical Archaeology of Military Sites: Method and Topic. Texas, United States: Texas A&M University Press. pp. 21–29. ISBN 978-1-60344-207-7.
- Styles, Philip (2002) [1964]. "The Commonwealth". In Nicoll, John Ramsay Allardyce (ed.). Shakespeare Survey. Shakespeare Criticism. Vol. 17. Cambridge, United Kingdom: Cambridge University Press. pp. 103–119. ISBN 0-521-52353-2.
- Sutherland, Tim (2009). "Killing Time: Challenging the Common Perceptions of Three Medieval Conflicts – Ferrybridge, Dintingdale and Towton – 'The Largest Battle on British Soil'" (PDF). Journal of Conflict Archaeology. 5 (1): 1–25. doi:10.1163/157407709x12634580640173. ISSN 1574-0773. S2CID 159544440. Archived from the original (PDF) on 4 June 2019.
- Sutherland, TL; Schmidt, A (2003). "The Towton Battlefield Archaeological Survey Project:An Integrated Approach to Battlefield Archaeology". Landscapes. 4 (2). JSTOR 3805936.
- Warren, Roger (2003) [1984]. "An Aspect of Dramatic Technique in Henry VI". In Alexander, Catherine M. S. (ed.). Shakespeare Criticism. The Cambridge Shakespeare Library. Vol. 2. Cambridge, United Kingdom: Cambridge University Press. ISBN 0-521-82433-8.

=== Newspaper articles ===
- Catton, Richard (22 November 2010). "'Unique' battlefield gun discovery on Towton battlefield". York Press. Archived from the original on 26 July 2020.
- Gill, A.A. (24 August 2008). "Towton, the Bloodbath that Changed the Course of Our History". The Sunday Times.
- Kettle, Martin (25 August 2007). "Our Most Brutal Battle has been Erased from Memory". The Guardian. p. 33. Archived from the original on 5 April 2010.

=== Online sources ===
- "English Heritage Battlefield Report: Towton 1461" (PDF). English Heritage. 1995. Archived from the original (PDF) on 8 July 2018.
- Historic England, "Battle of Towton, 1461 (Grade II) (1000040)", National Heritage List for England
