= Listed buildings in Towton =

Towton is a civil parish in the county of North Yorkshire, England. It contains four listed buildings that are recorded in the National Heritage List for England. All the listed buildings are designated at Grade II, the lowest of the three grades, which is applied to "buildings of national importance and special interest". The parish contains the village of Towton and the surrounding countryside, and the listed buildings consist of a memorial cross, a house, a milestone and a telephone kiosk.

== Buildings ==
Name and location	Photograph	Date	Notes
Dacre's Cross; 53.84177°N 1.27482°W		15th century	The cross commemorates the Battle of Towton, it is in magnesian limestone, and is about 2 metres (6 ft 7 in) in height. It consists of a wheel head cross on a tapering square shaft, on a splayed base, on a stepped modern plinth.
Greystones; 53.84938°N 1.26390°W		Mid-18th century (probable)	The house is in magnesian limestone, with quoins, a floor band, and a swept tile roof with stone coping. There are two storeys and three bays. The entrance is in the right gable end. On the ground floor of the front is a single-light casement window on the middle bay flanked by three-light mullioned windows. The middle bay of the upper floor contains a round-headed window, and on the outer bays are Diocletian windows.
Milestone; 53.85236°N 1.26296°W		Late 18th century	The milestone on the east side of the A162 road is in cast iron. It has a triangular plan with a rounded top, and is about 1 metre (3 ft 3 in) in height. The top is inscribed "TADCASTER & DONCASTER ROAD" and "TOWTON", on the left face are the distances to Doncaster, Pontefract and Ferrybridge, and on the right side the distances to York and Tadcaster.
Telephone kiosk 53.84931°N 1.26398°W		1935	The telephone kiosk to the south of Greystones is of the K6 type designed by Giles Gilbert Scott. Constructed in cast iron with a square plan and a dome, it has three unperforated crowns in the top panels.
