= 1215: The Year of Magna Carta =

2003 book by Danny Danziger and John Gillingham

- Book cover, first edition
- Author: Danny Danziger and John Gillingham
- Language: English
- Publisher: Hodder & Stoughton
- Publication date: 2003
- ISBN: 978-0340824740

1215: The Year of Magna Carta is a historical documentation of life in Medieval England written by author and journalist Danny Danziger and emeritus professor of history at the London School of Economics John Gillingham. It was originally published in 2003 by Hodder & Stoughton, a division of Hodder Headline. In 2004, it was published in the United States by Touchstone. This book is a sequel to Danziger's previous work, The Year 1000, which he co-authored with author Robert Lacey.

== Content ==
=== Overview ===
1215: The Year of Magna Carta is a work of creative non-fiction, a method of writing which is rarely used in writing a historical text. The book goes into detail about life in the Middle Ages, specifically in the year 1215. The book begins by explaining the everyday life of someone of royalty, then of the average peasant. It explains school, the countryside, hunting, tournaments, battles and the church. Throughout the book, several references to Magna Carta are intertwined with everyday events. For example, the chapter entitled "Family Strife" begins with the quotation from clause 62 of Magna Carta: "We have completely remitted and pardoned to all any ill will, grudge and rancor that have arisen between us and our subjects."

1215: The Year of Magna Carta continues to describe the life of a common scholar, where studies in the medical field were greatly encouraged to students who had failed at studying philosophy. While Oxford and Cambridge were the ideal universities to study, smaller schools became established in Salerno and Montpellier. This section goes on to explain women's education, which ended for them at age fifteen. After Danziger and Gillingham go at length explaining life in the Middle Ages, they begin to speak of how Magna Carta came to be, starting with King John.

=== King John and Magna Carta ===
The story of King John is told from his birth to his death, in between being his struggle in accepting to sign Magna Carta. Danziger and Gilingham go at length to explain the reasons that caused him to be spoiled as a child, that is, being neglected as a child. This led to his tyrannous rule as King of England after the death of his brother, Richard I. He had several mistresses, was unfaithful to his wife, and raised the taxes in England which made it impossible for the peasants to live. Thus, Magna Carta was written by the Barons of England to give the country a guideline.

The book ends with the reasons for the writing of Magna Carta. This includes the problems faced by the women and children of medieval England, who had hardly any rights, and how knights were duty-bound to protect them. There is an entire section that explains the myths regarding the writing and signing of Magna Carta. Some of the myths include: Magna Carta having no meaning after Prince Louis was crowned king and that it would not be an influential document for the rest of the world.

== Critical reception ==
1215: The Year of Magna Carta has received positive reviews from several critics and historians. Journalist Christina Hardyment, positively rating the book's global coverage and depth, expresses surprise on learning that King John used glasses to read and sign Magna Carta properly.

Critic Robert Heydt felt that the book is deceptive in its title as only "the final two chapters deal at length with the history and myth of the Great Charter, and the book includes the complete text of the document." Another critic, Wesley Burnett felt that the book is a clever historical documentation and is well written. However, he stated, "1215: The Year of Magna Carta doesn't follow the formula and won't win anyone tenure anywhere."
