= Dacre's Cross =

Structure in North Yorkshire, England

Coordinates: 53.8418°N 1.2748°W

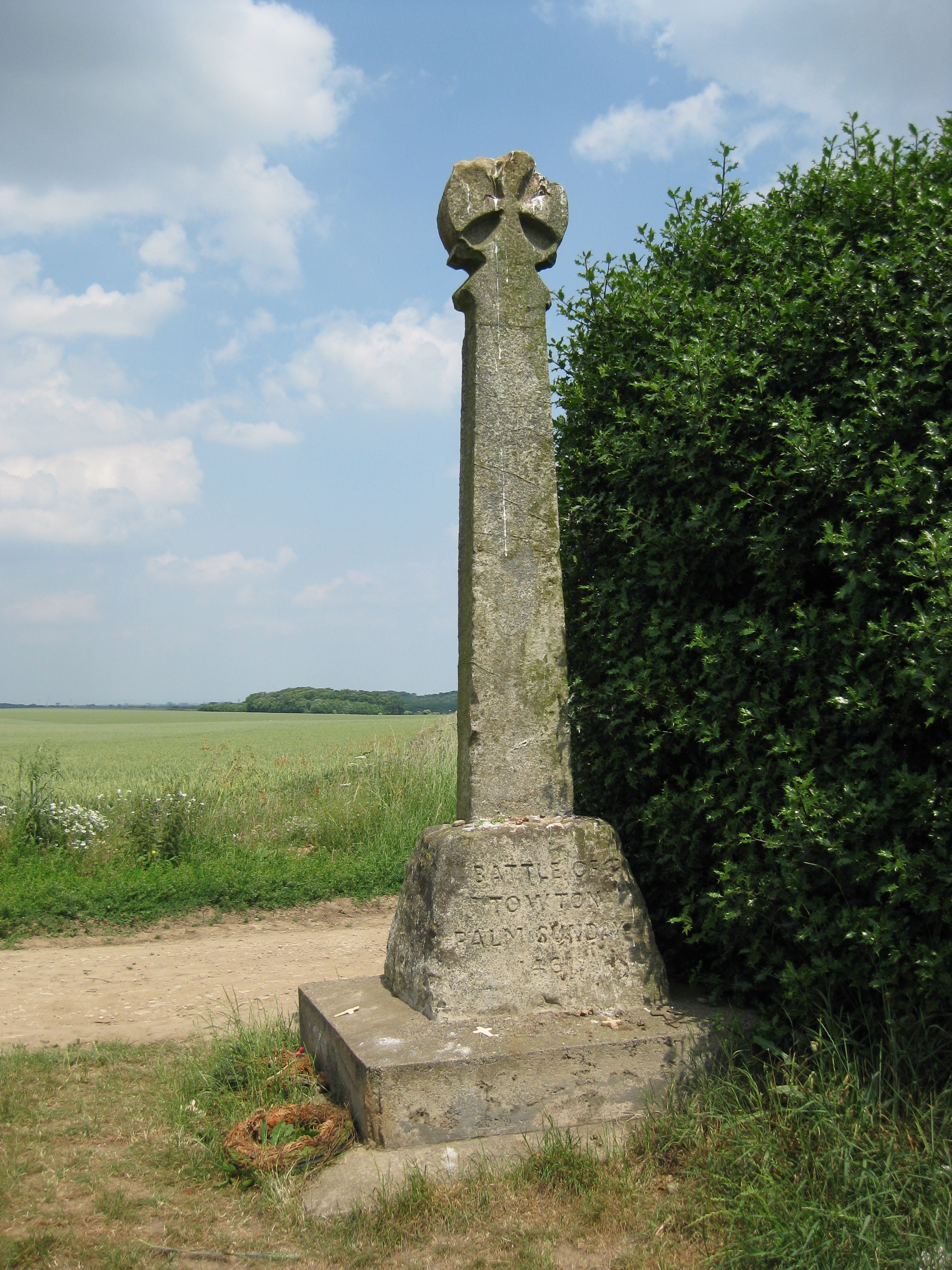
The monument, in 2010

Dacre's Cross, also known as Towton Cross, is a historic structure near Towton, a village in North Yorkshire, in England.

The cross was carved in the 15th century, given its style, and it has probably always been a memorial to the Battle of Towton in 1461. Local tradition holds that it marked a grave, perhaps that of Lord Dacre. However, Historic England argues that it was probably carved for a memorial chapel in the village of Towton, then when the chapel was abandoned unfinished, it was relocated to serve as a battlefield memorial, and perhaps also as a boundary marker. Over time, the site became overgrown and the cross forgotten, but in the early 20th century it was rediscovered and placed on a plinth. It was restored by James Ogden, relocated and placed on a new column in a new location by the B1217 road in 1927. It was grade II listed in 1967, and was designated as a scheduled monument in 1995.

The cross is constructed of magnesian limestone, and is about 2 metres (6 ft 7 in) in height. It consists of a wheel head cross on a tapering 1.7 metre-high square shaft, on a 0.4 metre-high splayed base, on a stepped modern plinth. The top of the cross is damaged. Although the base is mediaeval, its inscription, "Battle of Towton Palm Sunday 1461", is modern.

== See also ==
- Listed buildings in Towton
