= Sudhir Hazareesingh =

British historian (born 1961)

Sudhir Hazareesingh GCSK FBA
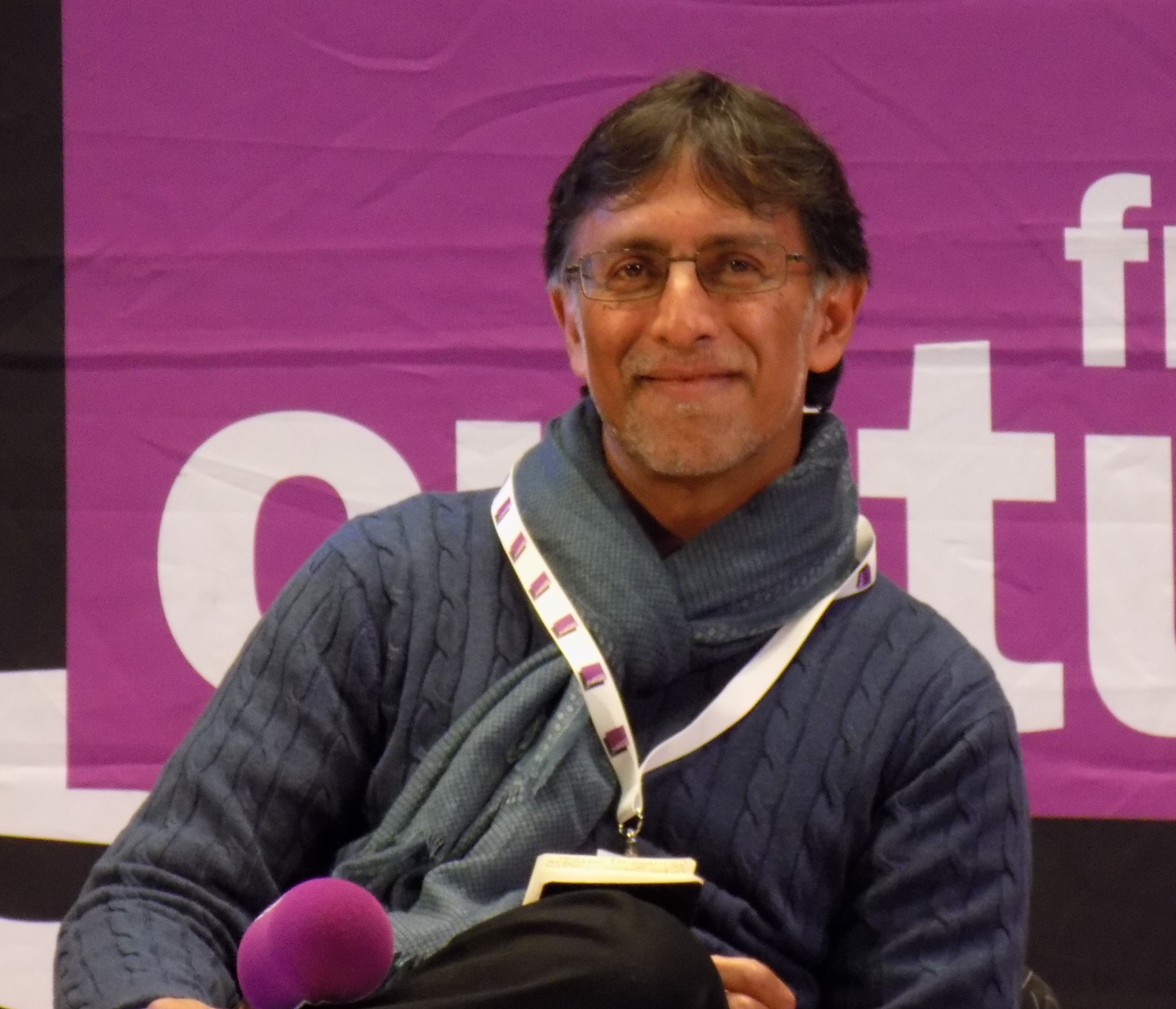
- Sudhir Hazareesingh, Forum France Culture Histoire, 2017.
- Born: 18 October 1961 (age 64)
- Occupation: Academic
- Notable work: Black Spartacus: The Epic Life of Toussaint Louverture

Sudhir Hazareesingh, GCSK, FBA (18 October 1961) is a British-Mauritian historian. He has been a fellow and Tutor in Politics at Balliol College, Oxford since 1990. Most of his work relates to modern political history from 1850; including the history of contemporary France as well as Napoleon, the Republic and Charles de Gaulle.

== Biography ==
Hazareesingh is the son of Kissoonsing Hazareesingh, a Cambridge- and Sorbonne-educated historian in his own right, who was a notable figure in Mauritian public life as a Mauritius Times writer and Principal Private Secretary to Seewoosagur Ramgoolam.

Hazareesingh's Toussaint Louverture biography Black Spartacus: The Epic Life of Toussaint Louverture was published by Farrar, Straus and Giroux in September 2020. It won the 2021 Wolfson History Prize and was shortlisted for the James Tait Black Prize for biography and the 2020 Baillie Gifford Prize. Described in The Guardian as "a tour de force: by far the most complete, authoritative and persuasive biography of Toussaint that we are likely to have for a long time", Black Spartacus was BBC Radio 4's "Book of the Week" from 16 November 2020, read by Adrian Lester.

He is a member of the international reading committee of the Institut Napoléon, a French learned society founded in 1932, dedicated to Napoleonic studies.

He is on the editorial boards of the international journal Napoleonica La Revue, "an online review which aims to promote research in the history of the First and Second French Empires". Napoleonica La Revue is "published by the Fondation Napoléon, is academic, multidisciplinary, international and peer-reviewed".

== Publications ==
- Daring to be Free: Rebellion and Resistance of the Enslaved in the Atlantic World. Allen Lane, 2025.
- Black Spartacus: The Epic Life of Toussaint Louverture. Allen Lane, 2019.
- How the French Think. Allen Lane, 2015
- In the Shadow of the General: Modern France and the Myth of De Gaulle. New York, Oxford University Press, 2012 (this is an English version of Le Mythe Gaullien, first published in French by Gallimard in 2010)
- Les préfets de Gambetta (with Vincent Wright and Éric Anceau), Paris, Presses de l'Université Paris-Sorbonne, 2007
- The Saint-Napoleon. Celebrations of Sovereignty in 19th Century France, Cambridge, Mass., Harvard University Press 2004 (French translation published by Editions Tallandier, 2007)
- The Legend of Napoleon, London, Granta, 2004 (French translation, Editions Tallandier, 2005; published in collection Points-Seuil, 2008)
- The Jacobin Legacy in Modern France. Essays in Honour of Vincent Wright (editor and contributor), Oxford, Oxford University Press, 2002
- Francs-Maçons sous le Second Empire (with Vincent Wright), Rennes, Presses Universitaires de Rennes, 2001
- Intellectual Founders of the Republic: Five Studies in 19th Century French Political Thought, Oxford, Oxford University Press, 2001 (revised paperback edition, 2005)

== Awards and decorations ==
- Mauritius:
  - Grand Commander of the Order of the Star and Key of the Indian Ocean (2020)
