= Arthur Aspinall (historian) =

British historian

Arthur Aspinall CVO
- Born: 11 July 1901; West Riding, Yorkshire
- Died: 2 May 1972 (aged 70); Isle of Man

Academic background
- Education: University of Manchester

Academic work
- Discipline: History
- Institutions: University of Rangoon (1925–31); University of Reading (1931–65)
- Main interests: Correspondence of George III and George IV

Arthur Aspinall, CVO (11 July 1901 – 2 May 1972) was a British historian.

== Early life ==
He was born in the West Riding, Yorkshire and educated at Manchester University, where he studied history.

== Academic career ==
He was appointed lecturer in history at the University of Rangoon in 1925, which he held until 1931. Here, he authored a book on Lord Cornwallis's career in India, Cornwallis in Bengal.

His first book, Lord Brougham and the Whig Party (1927), grew out of his doctoral thesis. It was praised as "thorough and masterly in treatment" by Lucy M. Brown and I. R. Christie.

In 1931 Aspinall became lecturer of history at Reading University and in 1947 he succeeded Frank Stenton to become professor of modern history. He was then professor of history from 1963 until his retirement in 1965. He edited the correspondence of George III and George IV: according to The Times, these volumes "stand as a permanent memorial to his astonishing industry and meticulous scholarship".

== Personal life ==
Aspinall was married to Gladys Shaw from 1931 until her death in 1965. In 1968 he married Beryl Johnson.

== Assessment ==
After his death, The Times said:

Aspinall was an exact scholar, with an unrivalled knowledge of the primary source materials for his period, the late eighteenth and early nineteenth centuries of British political history. He developed his academic life to the publication of impeccable edited texts of the major correspondence of the period, so that every historian working that field, now and in the future, will be heavily in his debt.

In his biography of George IV, E. A. Smith said: "My principal academic debt must be to the late Arthur Aspinall...who gave me endless encouragement. ... Doubtless he would have disapproved of some of my ideas about George IV but, such as it is, I offer my present work as a small tribute to his memory".

== Works ==
- Lord Brougham and the Whig Party (1927).
- Cornwallis in Bengal (1931).
- The Formation of Canning's Ministry, February to August, 1827 (1937).
- (editor), The Letters of King George IV, 1812–30 (1938).
- (editor), The Correspondence of Charles Arbuthnot (1941)
- (editor), Diary of Henry Hobhouse, 1820–47 (1947).
- Politics and the Press, 1780–1850 (1947).
- The Early English Trade Unions (1949).
- (editor), Mrs. Jordan and her family: being the unpublished correspondence of Mrs. Jordan and the Duke of Clarence, later William IV (1951).
- (editor), Three Early Nineteenth Century Diaries (1952).
- (editor), The Letters of King George IV with The Later Correspondence of George III (five volumes, 1962–70).
- (editor), The Correspondence of George, Prince of Wales, 1770–1810 (eight volumes, 1963–71).
