= Bernards Heath =

Heathland in St Albans, Hertfordshire, England

Coordinates: 51.7615°N 0.3332°W

Bernards Heath is a heathland in St Albans, Hertfordshire, the site of the Second Battle of St Albans in 1461 during the Wars of the Roses.

In the 19th century it was the Hertfordshire County cricket ground.

There is a Second World War public air raid shelter situated beneath Bernards Heath (NGR TL 1535 0820), the steps down into it are covered by a concrete slab.

== Local Facilities ==
Local park

Bernards Heath Nursary

Bernards Heath Infants School

Bernards Heath Junior School
