= E. A. Smith (historian) =

English historian

- Born: Ernest Anthony Smith; 25 December 1924; Grimethorpe, Yorkshire
- Died: 25 November 1998 (aged 73); Redhill, Surrey

Academic background
- Education: Emmanuel College, Cambridge; University of Reading

Academic work
- Discipline: History
- Institutions: University of Reading
- Main interests: Late 18th and early 19th century British political history

Ernest Anthony Smith (25 December 1924 – 27 November 1998) was an English historian who specialised in late-eighteenth and early-nineteenth century British political history.

== Early life ==
He was born in Grimethorpe, Yorkshire, and won an open scholarship to Emmanuel College, Cambridge, in 1942. However, he was called up for military service before he could take his place there, and served in the Royal Air Force during the Second World War. He finally went up to Cambridge in October 1947 to read history, before moving to Reading University in 1949 to study for a diploma in education.

== Academic career ==
From 1951 until 1954 he was an assistant lecturer at Reading, after being appointed by Arthur Aspinall, the professor of history. Smith was successively lecturer (1954–64), senior lecturer (1964–76) and reader (1976–90) at Reading.

Smith was employed by both Aspinall and Lewis Namier as a research assistant on The History of Parliament project. He was also joint editor (with Aspinall) of English Historical Documents, 1783-1832 (1959).

His first book was a biography of William Fitzwilliam, 4th Earl Fitzwilliam, a Whig politician. His biography also shed light on the survival of Whig principles from the age of Lord Rockingham and Edmund Burke to the era of Charles Grey and Lord John Russell. Smith wrote a biography of Grey, which was published in 1990, and a biography of George IV, published in 1999. In his last years he was working on a biography of William IV, whom he liked. He also aimed to write the biography George III, whom he considered "an evil old man".

In 1991 he was awarded a LittD from Cambridge. He was also instrumental in the founding of Reading Festival.

== Personal life ==
Smith married Daphine Greenhaigh in 1948, with whom he had a son and a daughter. They divorced in 1978, whereupon Smith married Anne Pallister, who died 1986. In 1988 he married Virginia Willcox. Smith died in Redhill, Surrey on 27 November 1998.

== Works ==
- Whig Principles and Party Politics: Earl Fitzwilliam and the Whig Party, 1748-1833 (1975)
- Lord Grey, 1764-1845 (1990)
- A Queen on Trial (1993)
- George IV (1999); for the Yale English Monarchs series
