= Medieval Siege Society =

- Formation: 1993AD
- Type: Historical reenactment society
- Location: United Kingdom
- Members: about 600
- Website: medieval-siege-society.co.uk

The Medieval Siege Society is a British living history and combat reenactment association dedicated to costumed reenactment of siege warfare, combat reenactment and events surrounding the history known as the Hundred Years War and the Wars of the Roses (circa 1350–1490). Apart from reenactment, it is also involved in research into the history of the period, and education (at the school or college level) about the same.

The Medieval Siege Society frequently performs at heritage sites around the UK and beyond, The Medieval Siege Society was formed in 1993 by a group of re-enactors and archers with an interest in Medieval reenactment and living history.

== Events ==
The Medieval Siege Society are an active society who take part in a number of events over the season, including Tewkesbury medieval festival, St Albans Hedingham Castle, Dover Castle Eltham Palace and England’s Medieval Festival at Herstmonceux Castle.

They are also very active in recreating battles from the Wars of the Roses and have been heavily involved with English heritage, The National trust and various TV and Film work.

== 550th Anniversary of the 2nd Battle of St Albans ==
On 26 & 27 February 2011 to commemorate the 550th anniversary year of the Second Battle of St Albans, the Battlefields Trust hosted a conference on the battle, close to the battle site. This featured authentic recreations from The Medieval Siege Society, a guided tour of the battlefield, and culminated in a Requiem Mass for the fallen at St Saviours Church conducted by Father Peter Wadsworth.

== Awards ==
Units from the Society have won a number of top prizes for "Best Living History" at England's Medieval Festival. In March 2011, the Society was awarded "Best Educational Display" at the British Leisure Show, a national showcase for the leisure industry.

== See also ==
- List of historical reenactment groups
