= Towton torcs =

Iron age gold torcs

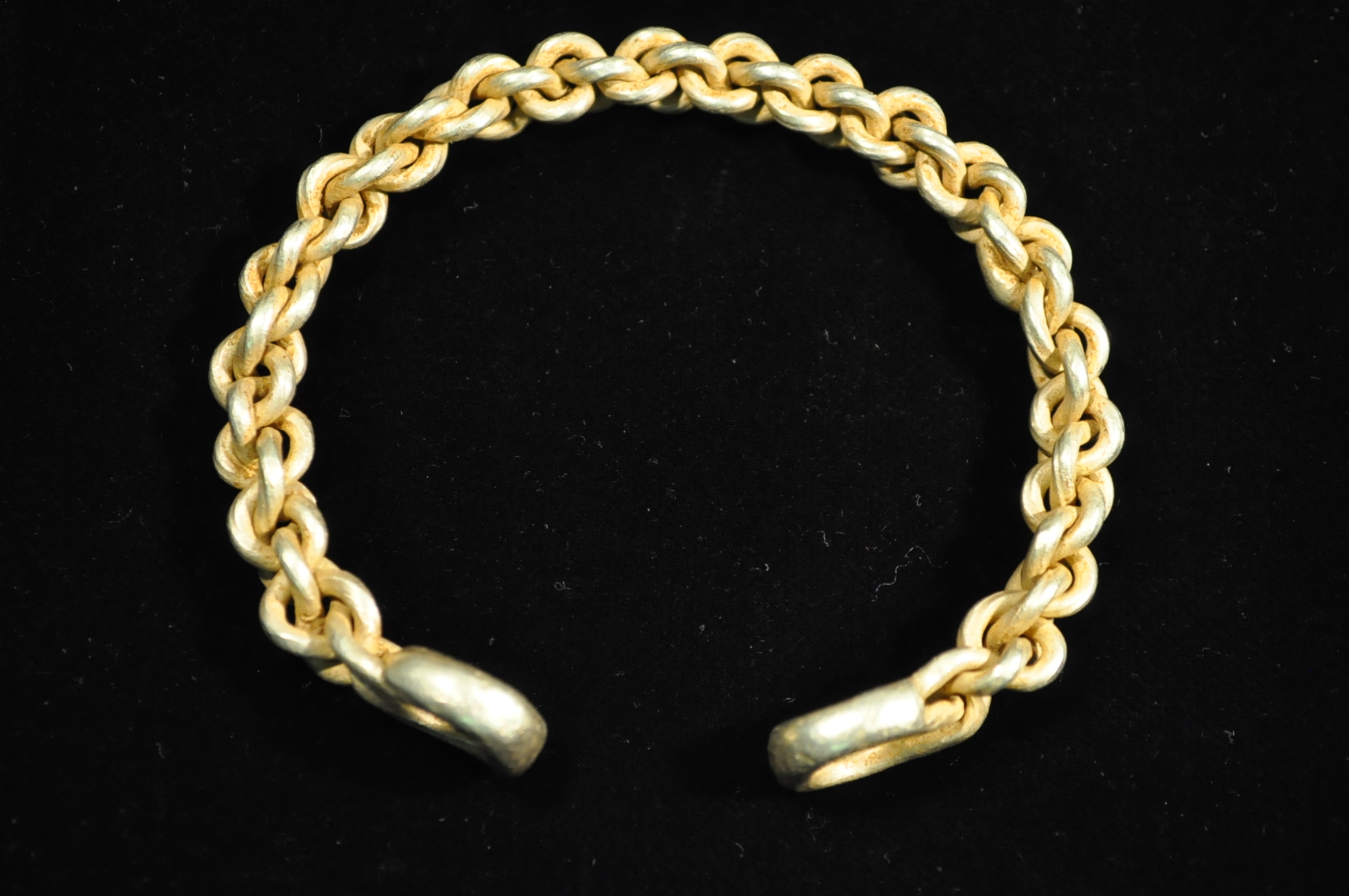
- The second of the two torcs discovered.
- Material: Gold, silver, and copper
- Period/culture: Iron Age Britain
- Discovered: 2010 and 2011; Towton, North Yorkshire
- Present location: Yorkshire Museum, York
- Identification: SWYOR-CFE7F7

The Towton torcs are a pair of gold bracelets from Towton, North Yorkshire, England, dating from the later Iron Age.

== Discovery ==
The torcs were found by metal detectorists in a stream in 2010 and 2011.

== Description ==
Both torcs are gold alloys and formed from a twisted wire with looped terminals. The first torc discovered comprised a twisted wire of two strands, the second had four strands. The first torc measured 75.1 millimetres (2.96 in) in diameter, weighed 67.7g. It had a metal content of 80-84% gold; 12-14% silver; and at least 4% copper.

== Acquisition and display ==
After being declared as treasure, the Yorkshire Museum launched a public funding campaign to raise the £60,000 required to purchase the torcs. The torcs were acquired by the museum in November 2013.
