= John Gillingham =

20th and 21st-century British historian of the Middle Ages

John Bennett Gillingham (born 3 August 1940) is Emeritus Professor of Medieval History at the London School of Economics and Political Science. On 19 July 2007 he was elected a Fellow of the British Academy.

Gillingham is renowned as an expert on the Angevin Empire.

== Books ==
Books by Gillingham:

- Richard the Lionheart (Weidenfeld and Nicolson, 1978)
- The Wars of the Roses: peace and conflict in fifteenth-century England (Weidenfeld and Nicolson, 1981)
- The Angevin Empire (E. Arnold, 1984)
- Richard Coeur de Lion: kingship, chivalry and war in the twelfth century (Hambledon Press, 1994)
- Richard I (Yale University Press, 1999) Part of the Yale English Monarchs Series
- The English in the Twelfth Century: imperialism, national identity, and political values (Boydell and Brewer, 2000)
- William II: The Red King (Allen Lane, 2015) Part of the Penguin Monarchs Series
