= Sarah Hamilton (historian) =

British historian

Sarah Hamilton is a British historian and the associate dean for education at the University of Exeter. Hamilton's research relates to the religious, social, and cultural history of early medieval Europe from c. 900 to c. 1200, medieval liturgy and ritual, bishops, the delivery of pastoral care, penance, excommunication, and heresy.

== Selected publications ==
- Church and People in the Medieval West, 900-1200, Pearson, Harlow, 2013.
- Writing Medieval Biography, 750-1250, Boydell and Brewer, Woodbridge, 2006. (with J.C. Crick & D. Bates)
- Defining the holy: sacred space in medieval and early modern Europe, Ashgate Publishing, Aldershot, 2005. (with A. Spicer)
- The practice of penance, 900-1050, Boydell and Brewer, 2001.
