= Yale English Monarchs series =

Biographies of British kings and queens

The Yale English Monarchs series is a series of biographies on English and British kings and queens, published by Yale University Press. The books are written by some of the leading experts within their respective fields, incorporating the latest historical research. Several books in the English Monarchs series have previously also been published by the University of California Press and Methuen London under the editorship of Professor J. J. Scarisbrick, though the series is today in the hands of Yale University Press.

The following table shows books published or forthcoming. Unless otherwise stated, the given regnal name also makes up the book title. The date given is the original publishing date of each book. Titles published by the University of California Press are in italics. Included in the list are also intervening monarchs on whom no books have been published yet.

Monarch	Reign	Author	Date	Notes
Offa of Mercia	757–796	Rory Naismith	2026	Published under the title Offa: King of the Mercians
Æthelstan	924–939	Sarah Foot	2011	Published under the title Æthelstan: The First King of England.
Edmund I	939–946	—	—	
Eadred	946–955	—	—	
Eadwig	955–959	—	—	
Edgar	959–975	—	—	
Edward the Martyr	975–978	—	—	
Æthelred the Unready	978–1013; 1014–1016	Levi Roach	2016	
Swein Forkbeard	1014	—	—	
Edmund II	1016	—	—	
Cnut the Great	1016–1035	Timothy Bolton	2017	
Harold I	1035–1040	—	—	
Harthacnut	1040–1042	—	—	
Edward the Confessor	1042–1066	Frank Barlow	1970	Re-published in 1997, with new material, an updated bibliography and a fresh introduction.
Edward the Confessor	1042–1066	Tom Licence	2020	Published under the title Edward the Confessor: Last of the Royal Blood.
Harold II	1066	Tom Licence	2026	Published under the title Harold: Warrior King
William I	1066–1087	David C. Douglas	1964	Published under the title William the Conqueror: The Norman Impact upon England.
William I	1066–1087	David Bates	2016	Published under the title William the Conqueror.
William II	1087–1100	Frank Barlow	1983	Published under the title William Rufus.
Henry I	1100–1135	C. Warren Hollister	2001	Incomplete at the time of the author's death in 1997. Edited and completed by Amanda Clark Frost.
Stephen	1135–1154	Edmund King	2011	
Matilda	1141–1148	Elisabeth van Houts	2026	Empress Matilda: Queen of the Romans, Ruler of the English
Henry II	1154–1189	W. L. Warren	1973	1973 and 1991 editions published by Methuen, Yale edition 2000, with a foreword by Judith A. Green.
Richard I	1189–1199	John Gillingham	1999	
John	1199–1216	W. L. Warren	1961	Second edition 1978, Yale edition 1997 with a foreword by David Carpenter
Henry III	1216–1272	David Carpenter	2021 & 2023	Vol 1 (published 2021) - the Rise to Power & Personal Rule (1207–58); Vol 2 (published 2023) - Reform, Rebellion, Civil War, Settlement (1259–72)
Edward I	1272–1307	Michael Prestwich	1997	
Edward II	1307–1327	J. R. S. Phillips	2010	
Edward III	1327–1377	W. M. Ormrod	2011	
Richard II	1377–1399	Nigel Saul	1997	
Henry IV	1399–1413	Chris Given-Wilson	2016	
Henry V	1413–1422	Christopher Allmand	1992	
Henry VI	1422–1461; 1470–1471	Bertram Wolffe	1981	Re-published in 2001, with a new foreword by John L. Watts.
Edward IV	1461–1470; 1471–1483	Charles Ross	1974	Re-published in 1997, with a substantial new foreword by Ralph A. Griffiths.
Edward V	1483–1483	—	—	
Richard III	1483–1485	Charles Ross	1981	Re-published in 2011, with a new foreword by Ralph A. Griffiths.
Richard III	1483–1485	Michael Hicks	2021	Published under the title Richard III: The Self-Made King.
Henry VII	1485–1509	S. B. Chrimes	1972	Re-published in 1999, with a new introduction and bibliographical updating by George Bernard.
Henry VIII	1509–1547	J. J. Scarisbrick	1968	Re-published in 1997, with an updated foreword by author J.J. Scarisbrick.
Edward VI	1547–1553	Jennifer Loach	1999	Incomplete at the time of the author's death in 1995. Edited and completed by George Bernard and Penry Williams.
Mary I	1553–1558	John Edwards	2011	Published under the title Mary I: England's Catholic Queen.
Elizabeth I	1558–1603	Simon Adams	—	Publication scheduled for 15 April 2027
James I	1603–1625	—	—	
Charles I	1625–1649	—	—	
Charles II	1660–1685	—	—	
James II	1685–1688	John Miller	1978	
Mary II	1689–1694	—	—	
William III	1689–1702	—	—	
Anne	1702–1714	Edward Gregg	1980	Re-published in 2001, with a new foreword by the author.
George I	1714–1727	Ragnhild Hatton	2001	Originally published in 1978. Yale edition contains a new foreword by Jeremy Black.
George II	1727–1760	Andrew C. Thompson	2011	Published under the title George II: King and Elector.
George III	1760–1820	Jeremy Black	2006	Published under the title George III: America's Last King.
George IV	1820–1830	E. A. Smith	1999	
William IV	1830–1837	—	—	
Victoria	1837–1901	—	—	
Edward VII	1901–1910	—	—	
George V	1910–1936	—	—	
Edward VIII	1936–1936	—	—	
George VI	1936–1952	—	—	
Elizabeth II	1952–2022	—	—	
Charles III	2022–	—	—	
