= Battle of Worksop =

Skirmish during the Wars of the Roses

- Part of the Wars of the Roses
Date	16 December 1460
Location	Worksop in Nottinghamshire, England 53°18′35″N 1°07′22″W
Result	Lancastrian victory

Belligerents
House of York	House of Lancaster

Commanders and leaders
Unknown	Duke of Somerset

Strength
Unknown	Unknown

Casualties and losses
Unknown	Unknown

The Battle of Worksop was a skirmish during the Wars of the Roses, near the town of Worksop, Nottinghamshire on 16 December 1460, part of the campaign which led to the Battle of Wakefield on 30 December.

There is very scant evidence of what happened during this event and the only contemporary account comes from William of Worcester in his book Annales rerum Anglicarum, in which he stated (Translation from Latin):

In December Parliament adjourned. And the Duke of York, with the Earl of Salisbury and many thousand armed men, were going from London to York, in December 1460, when a portion of his men, the van, as is supposed, or perhaps the scouts... were cut off by the people of the Duke of Somerset at Worsop" [Worksop].

Somerset had marched from Corfe Castle, Dorset and was heading north towards the rest of the Lancastrian army which had been based in Hull before moving onto Pontefract. It is not known how many men Beaufort had at Worksop as he had split up his cavalry and footmen at Exeter to move more quickly to the north.

It is supposed that York's men had diverted off the Great North Road to get to Sandal Castle, though it is not clear why they went via Worksop. The area was under Lancastrian control, with the closest area securely held by the Yorkists being at Doncaster. There was widespread flooding at the time which would have made travelling difficult and food hard to find. A market was held in Worksop every Thursday and scouting parties may have been sent there to look for supplies. The most plausible reason however would have been to check on the Lancastrian forces situated around the town or for retribution towards Worksop Manor, where the Earl of Shrewsbury had been killed at the Battle of Northampton on 10 July that year. Also Richard of York had a personal vendetta against the Beauforts, ever since the 2nd Duke of Somerset's disastrous handling of the final campaigns of the Hundred Years' War.

There is no physical evidence of the battle except perhaps a section of skull in Worksop Priory with a bodkin arrowhead lodged firmly in it. This is visible to members of the public and located in the north aisle of the church towards the west end.
