= Rout of Ludford Bridge =

Confrontation during the Wars of the Roses

- Part of the Wars of the Roses
Date	12 October 1459
Location	By Ludford Bridge, south of Ludlow, in Shropshire, England (Note: The village of Ludford was in Herefordshire in 1459; the bridge crossed the county boundary.) 52°21′49.5″N 2°43′8″W
Result	Lancastrian victory

Belligerents
House of Lancaster	House of York

Commanders and leaders
Henry VI; Duke of Buckingham	Duke of York; Earl of Salisbury; Earl of Warwick

Strength
Perhaps 12,000–15,000	Perhaps 6,000–8,000

Casualties and losses
Unknown	Unknown
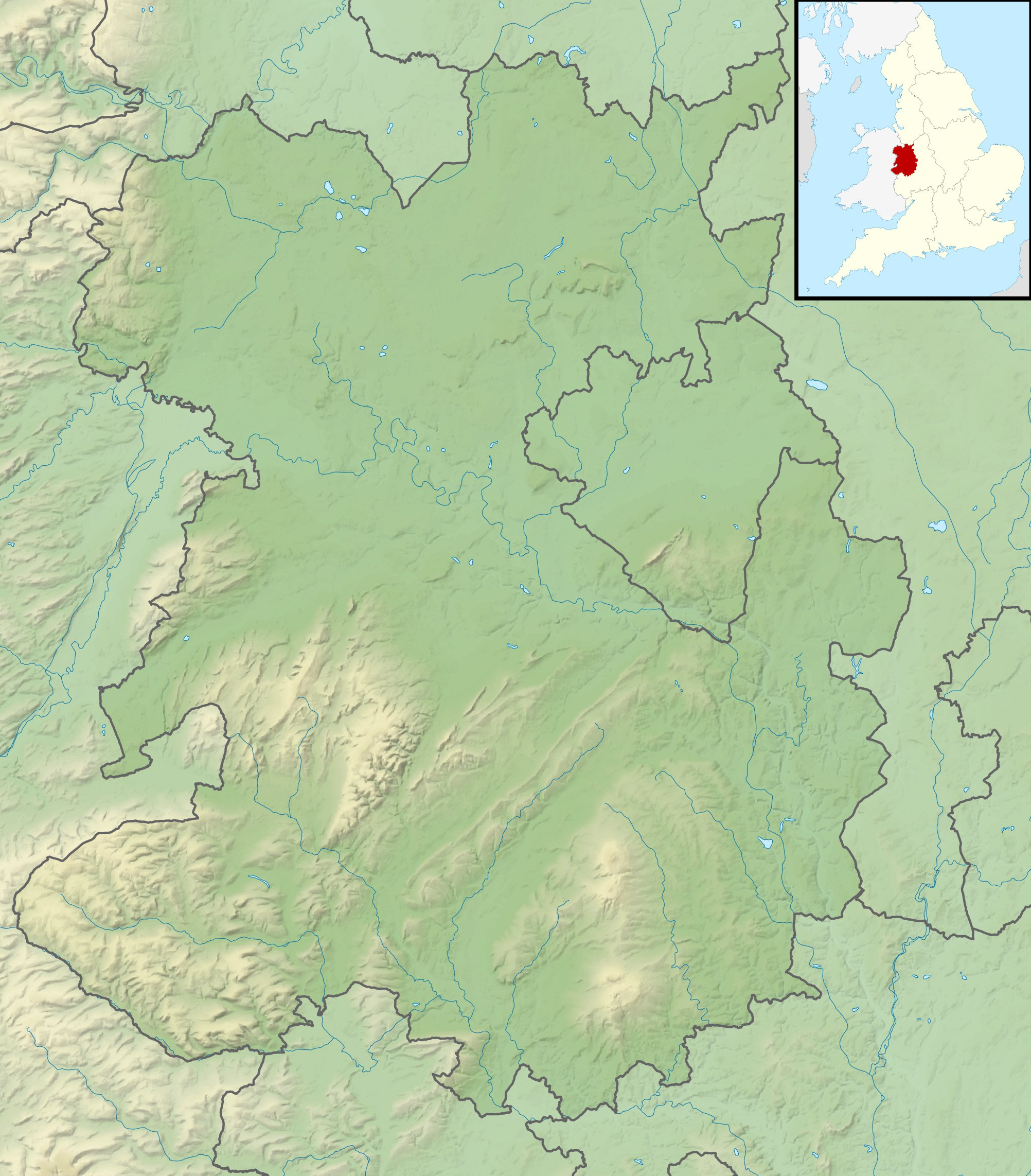
- Location within Shropshire

The Rout of Ludford Bridge was a largely bloodless confrontation fought in the early years of the Wars of the Roses. It took place on 12 October 1459, and resulted in a setback for the Yorkists. Although this seemed to be a triumph for the rival Lancastrians at the time, they had thrown away their advantage within six months.

== Background ==
In the first pitched battle of the wars, the First Battle of St Albans in 1455, Richard of York, backed by his brother in law the Earl of Salisbury and Salisbury's son the Earl of Warwick, had eliminated most of his rivals at court. He reaffirmed his allegiance to the (Lancastrian) King, Henry VI and was reappointed Lord Protector, until February 1456. However, Henry's Queen, Margaret of Anjou, suspected that Richard ultimately intended to supplant her infant son Edward of Westminster, Prince of Wales and become King himself. She continually plotted and agitated against Richard and the Nevilles (the Earls of Salisbury and Warwick). She was supported by several nobles, many of them the sons of York's opponents who had died at St. Albans.

The renewed outbreak of open warfare was precipitated by some high-handed actions by Warwick, who held the post of Captain of Calais. Late in 1458, he had led ships from Calais in attacks on merchant ships from Lübeck and Spain, on obscure grounds of acknowledgement of English sovereignty in the Channel, to secure plunder to pay his garrison. Though these actions infuriated the royal court, they were popular among the merchants, particularly in London and Kent, as they removed competitors for English trade with Flanders. When Warwick was summoned to London to explain his actions before the King's council, there was violence between Warwick's retinue and the royal household. Warwick claimed that his life had been threatened and he returned to Calais with any charges unanswered.

Margaret took this to be open defiance of Henry's authority. She had long before persuaded Henry to move the court from London to the Midlands, where her supporters had the most influence. They began mustering their forces, and summoned a council to be held in Coventry on 24 June 1459. York, Salisbury and Warwick himself feared that they would be arrested for treason if they went to their opponents' heartland, and refused to attend. They were quickly indicted for rebellion.

The Yorkist forces began the campaign dispersed over the country. York himself was at Ludlow in the Welsh Marches, Salisbury was at Middleham Castle in North Yorkshire and Warwick was at Calais. As Salisbury and Warwick marched to join the Duke of York, Margaret ordered a force under the Duke of Somerset to intercept Warwick and another under James Tuchet, 5th Baron Audley to intercept Salisbury. Warwick successfully evaded Somerset, while Audley's forces were routed by Salisbury's army at the bloody Battle of Blore Heath.

== Battle ==
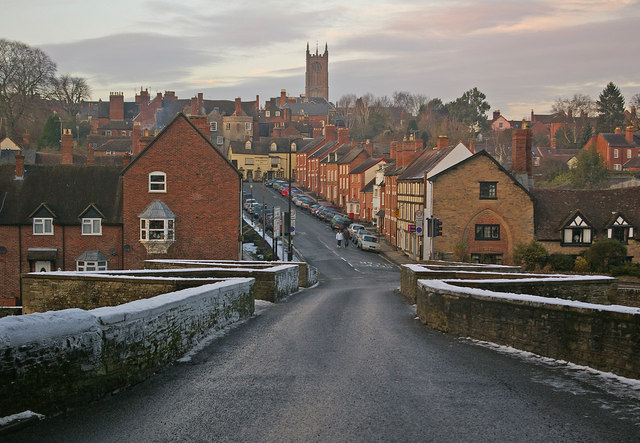
Ludford Bridge with Lower Broad Street leading to Ludlow's Broad Gate.

Even after this defeat, the forces available to Henry and Margaret outnumbered the Yorkist combined armies by two to one. The Yorkist army tried to move towards London, but found their path blocked by the Lancastrian army with King Henry himself nominally at its head, and fell back to Worcester. Here, the Duke of York attended mass in the cathedral before sending written protestations of his loyalty to Henry. These were ignored.

The Yorkists retreated towards Ludlow, before making a stand at a fortified position near Ludford, Shropshire on 12 October. Their troops excavated a defensive ditch in a field on the opposite side of the River Teme from Ludlow, near the bridge which gave the battle its name. They also constructed barricades of carts in which cannon were emplaced. However, morale was low, not least because the royal standard could be seen flying in the Lancastrian army, and it was known that King Henry himself was present, in full armour. For much of his reign, Henry had been regarded as an ineffectual ruler, and he had even lapsed into madness for periods of several months at a time. Richard of York and his supporters had maintained that they were opposed only to Henry's "evil counsellors". Now they realised that their army would probably refuse to fight against an army which included Henry himself. Henry and the Duke of Buckingham, in command of the royal army, proclaimed the offer of a pardon to any who would change sides.

Among the troops brought by Warwick from Calais were 600 men led by Andrew Trollope, an experienced soldier. During the night, Trollope and his men and others from the Yorkist forces defected to the Lancastrians. Faced with certain defeat, York, Salisbury, and Warwick announced that they were returning to Ludlow for the night. They then abandoned their armies and fled into Wales.

At dawn on 13 October, the leaderless Yorkist troops knelt in submission before Henry, and were pardoned. York had abandoned not only his troops but also his wife Cecily Neville, Duchess of York, his two younger sons George and Richard and his youngest daughter Margaret. By popular account, they were found standing at the Ludlow Market Cross when the Lancastrians arrived. They were placed in the care of the Duchess's sister Anne, wife of the Duke of Buckingham. The Lancastrian troops proceeded to plunder Ludlow, becoming drunk on looted wine and committing many outrages.

== Aftermath ==
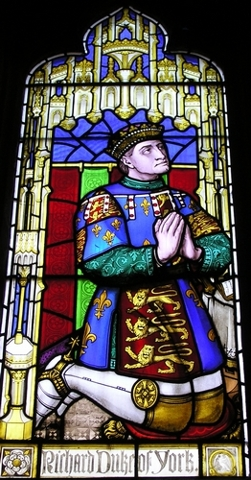
Richard, Duke of York, portrayed in a stained glass window at St Laurence's Church, Ludlow. The town still bears the House of York's roses in its crest.

York, with his second son Edmund, Earl of Rutland, made his way to Ireland where he had previously been Lieutenant of Ireland, and still had support from the Irish parliament. Salisbury, Warwick, and York's eldest son Edward, Earl of March went to South Wales, where Warwick had estates and supporters. There they took a ship, also intending to reach Ireland, but were blown across the Bristol Channel to the West Country where a supporter, Sir John Dynham, loaned them a boat which took them to Calais. On 9 October, King Henry had appointed the Duke of Somerset to replace Warwick as Captain of Calais. However, Warwick was able to forestall him, possibly only by hours. Under Warwick's uncle, Lord Fauconberg, the garrison and city still supported Warwick.

King Henry and his army meanwhile returned to Coventry, where a Parliament packed with Queen Margaret's supporters attainted York, Salisbury and Warwick and their remaining supporters. However, it proved impossible for the Earl of Wiltshire, who was appointed Lieutenant of Ireland in Richard of York's place, to raise troops to oust York from Ireland. Somerset was able to land near Calais and captured the nearby castle of Guînes but was twice repulsed when he tried to capture Calais from Warwick. Warwick was able to sail to Ireland, evading the royal ships commanded by the Duke of Exeter, to concert plans with the Duke of York.

Although it had appeared that the country had been united behind King Henry at the time of the Rout of Ludford Bridge, within a short time the behaviour of Henry's court had prompted many complaints that Lancastrian favourites were enriching themselves at the expense of the King and populace, and were failing to prevent the spread of lawlessness. It was these grievances which Richard of York had first used as pretext to take arms against Henry's court in the early 1450s. Within six months of the confrontation, Warwick was able to land at Sandwich in Kent, with popular support from London and the south east of England. He then marched into the Midlands and, aided by treachery in the Lancastrian army, he captured King Henry at the Battle of Northampton.
