= Towton =

Village and civil parish in North Yorkshire, England

Coordinates: 53.849925°N 1.2634889°W

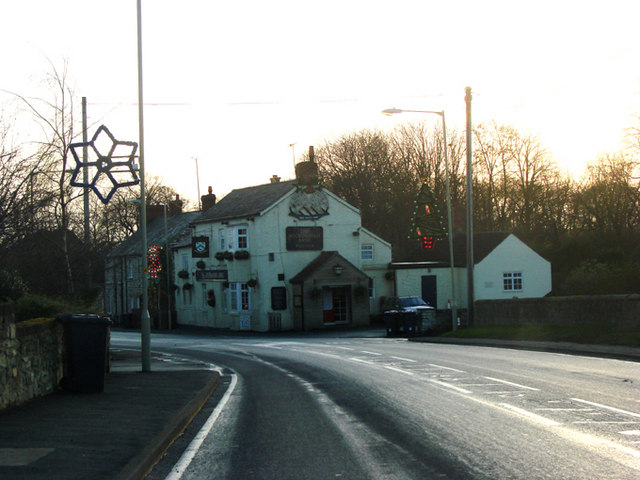
- The Rockingham Arms, Towton

- Location within North Yorkshire
- Population: 226 (2011 census)
- OS grid reference: SE485395
- Civil parish: Towton
- Unitary authority: North Yorkshire
- Ceremonial county: North Yorkshire
- Region: Yorkshire and the Humber
- Country: England
- Sovereign state: United Kingdom
- Post town: TADCASTER
- Postcode district: LS24
- Police: North Yorkshire
- Fire: North Yorkshire
- Ambulance: Yorkshire

Towton /ˈtaʊtən/ is a small village and civil parish in the county of North Yorkshire, England.

It was historically part of the West Riding of Yorkshire until 1974. From 1974 to 2023 it was part of the Selby District, it is now administered by the unitary North Yorkshire Council.

== History ==
In 2010 and 2011 a pair of gold torcs dating to the Iron Age were discovered by metal detectorists. The 'Towton torcs' were acquired by the Yorkshire Museum in 2013.

The name Towton derives from the Old Norse personal name Tofi and the Old English tūn, meaning 'settlement'.

The village is best known for the Battle of Towton, fought on Palm Sunday, 29 March 1461, during the Wars of the Roses. It was at this battle that Sir David Ap Mathew saved the life of Edward IV. Once King, Edward granted Sir David Ap Mathew permission to use 'Towton' on the Mathew family crest.

The battle has been described as "probably the largest and bloodiest battle ever fought on English soil."

== See also ==
- Listed buildings in Towton
