= Éric Anceau =

French historian

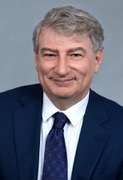
Anceau in 2025

Éric Anceau (born 6 December 1966) is a French historian, specialising in the French Second Empire, Napoléon III and 'laïcité'.

He was habilitated maître de conférences (HDR) at Sorbonne Université, where he taught 19th century history and the history of powers, 'public action' and societies in France and Europe up to the present day. He has published on nation states, international relations, major 19th century conflicts, education policies and secularism. On leaving those roles in 2023 he was elected professor in French and European political and social contemporary history at the University of Lorraine.

He won the Fondation Napoléon's top prize in 2000 for his work on the Second Empire and several other prizes, including three from the Institut de France (particularly the Guizot Prize from the Académie française in 2018 and the Institut's Hugot Prize in 2021 on the proposal of the Académie des sciences morales et politiques for his book Les Élites françaises. Des Lumières au grand confinement) and the 'Prix du Mémorial, grand prix littéraire d'Ajaccio'. On 15 January 2025 he was made a knight of the Legion of Honour.

== Life ==
Born in the 14th arrondissement of Paris, he became an agrégation d'histoire professor in 1991, · and then a doctor in history at Paris-Sorbonne in 1997. He qualified as a research supervisor in 2012 and became maître de conférences (HDR) at the Sorbonne, where he taught 19th century European history during the first year of his degree. He also coordinated the methodology of the master's degree in contemporary history and held a doctoral seminar in 19th and 20th century French and European political and social history. For many years he also taught at Sciences-Po Paris and created and led a double course in history and social sciences hosted at both institutions. He was a researcher associated with the SIRICE. Previously, for twenty-five years he formed part of the Centre d'histoire du XIXe siècle. He also leads the political strand of the LabEx EHNE (Écrire une histoire nouvelle de l'Europe) and is vice-president of the Comité d'histoire parlementaire et politique, assistant director of Histoire, Économie et Société, member of the editing committee of Parlement(s), Revue d'histoire politique, and member of the research committee of several other journals such as Revue politique et parlementaire. Since the start of the 2024–2025 academic year he has taught at the Nancy campus of the University of Lorraine.

In 2000 he won the Fondation Napoléon's top prize in the Second Empire category for his Dictionnaire des députés du Second Empire (Presses Universitaires de Rennes) and for Les députés du Second Empire. Prosopographie d’une élite du XIXe siècle (Éditions Champion).

As a specialist in the Second French Republic, Second Empire and the early years of the Third French Republic, Anceau has been guest professor at several foreign universities such as the University of Poznan, University College London, Zhejiang University in Hangzhou, China and the University of Bucharest in Romania. He is a member of the Romanian Academy and of the historic committees of the Archives de France, the French Senate, the Conseil d'État, the 'Jurisdiction administrative', and of the 150th anniversary of the Franco-Prussian War. He was a member of the committee of the Fondation Carnot de la Fondation de France and research advisor to the 19th century galleries at the Musée de l'Armée. He is president of the jury of the Mérimée Prize for the best thesis on the Second Empire. His Napoléon III. Un Saint-Simon à cheval (Tallandier, 2008 et 2012) won the 'prix Drouyn de Lhuys' from the Institut de France and the 'Grand Prix du Mémorial'.

An old friend of Jean-Pierre Chevènement, Éric Anceau says he does not identify with the left-right divide, which he states must be overcome in the name of a certain idea of France. He is also a member of the national office of the Debout la France party as a national delegate to the École de la République and the Cohésion nationale and also as head of the party's planning and its presidential programme #NDA2017, which he prepared alongside several hundred civil service experts and civil society activists.

Nicolas Dupont-Aignan's decision to back Marine Le Pen against Emmanuel Macron in the second round of the 2017 French presidential election led Anceau and three of the party's four vice-presidents (Dominique Jamet, Anne Boissel and François Morvan) to leave the party. · Though he remains conservative in his position, motivated by his "certain idea of France" and left-wing or 'social' Gaullism, Anceau disapproved of Dupont-Aignan's decision and therefore withdrew from all political activity.

== Main publications ==
- Comprendre le Second Empire, Saint-Sulpice Éditeur, Tranches d'histoire, 1999, 191 p., preface by Philippe Séguin.
- Dictionnaire des députés du Second Empire, Presses universitaires de Rennes, Collection Carnot, 1999, 421 p. + X p., preface by Bernard Lachaise.
- Les Députés du Second Empire. Prosopographie d’une élite du XIXe siècle, Champion et Slatkine, 2000, 1018 p., preface by Jean Tulard.
- La Révolution française, Saint-Sulpice Éditeur, Tranches d'histoire, 2000, 189 p., preface by Jean-Paul Bertaud
- La France de 1848 à 1870. Entre ordre et mouvement, Le Livre de Poche, références, collection by La France contemporaine edited by Jean-François Sirinelli, L.G.F., 2002, 256 p.
- In collaboration with Dominique Barjot, Isabelle Lescent-Giles and Bruno Marnot (editors), Les Entrepreneurs du Second Empire, P.U.P.S., 2003, 224 p.
- Les Grands discours parlementaires du XIXe siècle de Benjamin Constant à Adolphe Thiers, Assemblée nationale and Armand Colin, 2005, preface by Jean-Louis Debré
- Mémoires sur le règne de Napoléon III (1851 – 1864) par le comte Horace de Viel Castel, full text with notes, preface, timeline, dictionary of main figures mentioned and index, Robert Laffont, Coll. Bouquins, 2005, XLIX + 1130 p.
- Introduction au XIXe siècle, tome 1: 1815 – 1870, Belin, Atouts, collection edited by Joël Cornette and Michel Puzelat, 2003, 224 p.
- Napoléon. L’Homme qui a changé le monde, J’ai lu, Librio collection, 2004, 96 p.
- Introduction au XIXe siècle, tome 2: 1870 – 1914, Belin, Atouts, collection edited by Joël Cornette and Michel Puzelat, 2005, 256 p.
- Morny et l’invention de Deauville, A. Colin, 2010, in collaboration with Dominique Barjot and Nicolas Stoskopf, 462 p.
- Napoléon III. Un Saint-Simon à cheval, Tallandier, 2012, 750 p. (prix Drouyn de Lhuys de l'Académie des sciences morales et politiques et grand prix du Mémorial de la ville d'Ajaccio)
- Dossier « Une laïcité européenne ? La place des religions dans l’Europe d’hier, d’aujourd’hui et demain » (editor), Commentaire, n° 155, automne 2016, p. 599-624.
- L'Empire libéral, éditions SPM, 2 tomes, 2017, 1425 p. (prix Guizot de l'Académie française)
- Être nationaliste à l'ère des masses en Europe (1900-1920), in collaboration with Olivier Dard and Didier Musiedlak, Bruxelles, Peter Lang, 432 p.
- Histoire des internationales, Nouveau Monde éditions, 2017, 320 p., coedited with Jacques-Olivier Boudon and Olivier Dard
- Comprendre le XIXe siècle, Belin, 2018, 470 p.
- Qu’est-ce qu’une nation en Europe ? Presses de l'université Paris-Sorbonne, in collaboration with Henri Temple, 2018, 280 p.
- Ils ont fait et défait le Second Empire, Tallandier, 2019, 384 p.
- Les Élites françaises. Des Lumières au grand confinement, Passés Composés, 2020.
- Napoléon 1769-1821, Librio collection, 2021.
- Laïcité, un principe: De l'Antiquité au temps présent, Passés Composés, 2022, 384 p. ISBN 978-2-3793-3630-0
- Histoire mondiale des impôts : De l'Antiquité à nos jours, Passés Composés, 2023, ISBN 978-2-3793-3737-6
- With Pierre Branda (editor), Napoléon III et l'économie, CNRS Éditions, 2024, 350 p.
- (editor) Les Quarante-huitards et les autres. Dictionnaire des dirigeants de 1848, Sorbonne Université Presses, 2024, 1800 p. ISBN 979-10-231-0622-0
- Histoire de la nation française. Du mythe des origines à nos jours, Tallandier, 2025, 522 p. ISBN 979-10-210-4655-9
- Gambetta, PUF, 2025, 175 p.
- (editor) Nouvelle histoire de France, Passés Composés, 2025, 550 p.
