= Listed buildings in Penrith, Cumbria =

Penrith is a town and civil parish in Westmorland and Furness, Cumbria, England. It contains 191 listed buildings that are recorded in the National Heritage List for England. Of these, five are listed at Grade I, the highest of the three grades, 23 are at Grade II*, the middle grade, and the others are at Grade II, the lowest grade. Most of the listed buildings are in the town of Penrith, with some in the surrounding countryside. The majority of these buildings are houses and associated structures, and shops. The other listed buildings include churches and structures in the churchyards, a ruined castle, bridges, public houses and hotels, a plague stone, a beacon tower, farmhouses and farm buildings, civic buildings, a school, a railway station, a clock tower, cemetery buildings, a bank, two war memorials and a war memorial gate, and a telephone kiosk.

== Key ==
Grade	Criteria
I	Buildings of exceptional interest, sometimes considered to be internationally important
II*	Particularly important buildings of more than special interest
II	Buildings of national importance and special interest

== Buildings ==
Name and location	Photograph	Date	Notes	Grade
St Andrew's Church; 54.66414°N 2.75128°W		13th century (probable)	The oldest part of the church is the lower stage of the tower, the upper part dating from the 15th century, and the rest of the church was rebuilt in 1721–22. It is built in red sandstone, and consists of a nave, a chancel, a shallow square apse, and a west tower. The west doorway has Doric columns, a triglyph frieze, and a triangular pediment. Along the sides of the church are two tiers of round-headed windows with chamfered surrounds and triple keystones. Between the windows are pilasters, and on the south wall is a sundial.	I
Hutton Hall; 54.66501°N 2.74871°W	—	14th century	The oldest part is a pele tower, with a cottage in front dating from the 17th and 18th centuries. The pele tower is square with a pyramidal roof, and contains very small windows. The cottage is stuccoed with a slate roof, and has two storeys and four bays. The doorway has a chamfered surround, and the windows are sashes in stone architraves.	II*
Penrith Castle; 54.66215°N 2.75713°W		c. 1397	The castle. now a ruin, is built in red sandstone. It was extended in the early 15th century, and further extended and converted into a residence in the 1470s by the future Richard III. The major remains consist of part of the south wall and the east tower, and tunnel vaults. In the walls are Perpendicular windows, and fireplace flues with pointed arches. The courtyard contains a circular wall, and to the northwest are the ruins of the gatehouse.	I
Eamont Bridge; 54.65158°N 2.74201°W		15th century (probable)	The bridge carries the A6 road over the River Eamont, and was widened in 1875. It is in sandstone, and consists of a slightly humped bridge with three segmental arches. There are two cutwaters rising to form pedestrian refuges with solid parapets. The bridge is also a Scheduled Monument.	I
Gloucester Arms; 54.66313°N 2.75361°W		c. 1470	A public house, originally Dockray Hall and the home of the future Richard III, with most of the present building dating from 1580. It is in stuccoed red sandstone, and has two storeys. On the front is a two-storey gabled porch containing a doorway above which is a carved and dated coat of arms. To the right is another doorway with an alternate block surround and another coat of arms above. Further to the right are a two-storey bay window and an arched coach entry. The windows vary; one is cross-mullioned, some are sashes, and some have hood moulds.	I
Tudor Restaurant; 54.66380°N 2.75160°W	—	1563	The original house faces St Andrew's Place, and the restaurant front facing King's Street dates from a later period. The original house is in stone and has two gabled storeys. The windows have four lights with rounded heads and mullions, above the upper window is a string course, and in the gable is a small square window. To the right of the gable, and later, are three storeys containing a doorway with a shaped head, sash windows, and a round-headed stair window.	II*
Plague stone 54.65885°N 2.74618°W	—	1598	This is possibly a cross base. It is in whinstone, and consists of a block measuring 2 feet 6 inches (0.76 m) by 2 feet 0 inches (0.61 m) by 1 foot 6 inches (0.46 m). The stone has chamfered angles and a square socket on the top.	II*
13–15 Sandgate; 54.66587°N 2.75028°W	—	1647	A row of three stuccoed stone houses with a slate roof and two storeys. Each house has a doorway with a segmental head and a fanlight. The windows are sashes in plain stone architraves, all but one of which are double.	II*
6–12 Corn Market; 54.66350°N 2.75301°W	—	17th century	A row of shops, some dating from the 18th century. They are in stuccoed stone with quoins, and have two storeys. In the ground floor are shop fronts, and above are sash windows in plain stone architraves. Nos. 9 and 10 have a moulded eaves cornice, No. 11 has a doorway converted into a window that has a dated lintel, and No. 12 has double sash windows.	II
Bowerbank Hall; 54.67067°N 2.75992°W	—	17th century	A roughcast house with two storeys. The doorway is chamfered, and above it is an inscription with a name and date, and over that is a hood mould. The windows are sashes.	II
Tudor Cottage; 54.66378°N 2.75152°W	—	17th century (possible)	A small simple cottage in stuccoed stone with two storeys. It has a plain doorway and a sash window in each floor.	II
Two Lions Public House and stables 54.66255°N 2.75240°W		17th century	The former public house originated as the New Hall, and was extended in the 18th century. It is in roughcast stone, and has two low storeys, a gabled wing to the right, and a former stable with loft to the left. On the front is a doorway with a moulded surround and a four-centred arched head, another doorway with a shaped lintel, a porch, and a sash window. At the rear is a blocked mullioned window with hood mould, and a re-used datestone. Inside is a plaster ceiling including coats of arms.	II*
Cockell House; 54.66965°N 2.75874°W	—	1660	The house was extended in the 18th century. It is in stuccoed stone with two storeys, a symmetrical three-bay front, and a rear wing. The central doorway has two three-quarter Doric columns with block entablatures, a semicircular fanlight, and an open pediment. The windows are sashes, and in the right return is a staircase window with mullions and transoms.	II*
12 King Street; 54.66329°N 2.75087°W	—	1669	The building originated as a public house, the oldest part being the left doorway, and the rest was rebuilt in the late 19th century. Above the left doorway is a shaped, moulded and inscribed lintel. The building is in stone, and has two storeys with attics and two bays. The windows in the ground and upper floors are double sashes, and in the attic they are single sashes in half-dormers.	II
Tourist Information Centre; 54.66572°N 2.75413°W		1670	Originally Robinson's School, later used as a tourist information centre, it is in roughcast stone with a stone-slate roof, and has two low storeys. The doorway has a moulded surround and a lintel with an inscription and date. The mullioned windows have two and three lights and a hood mould, part of it continuing over the doorway.	II*
45 and 46 Burrowgate; 54.66501°N 2.75201°W	—	Late 17th century	A pair of shops in stuccoed stone with a stone-flagged roof and two low storeys. In the centre is a yard entry with a moulded surround.In the ground floor are shop fronts, and in the upper storeys are sash windows.	II
Friends' Meeting House; 54.66637°N 2.75125°W	—	1699	The meeting house was enlarged in 1730, and again in 1803, with the addition of a gabled wing, giving an L-shaped plan and providing a new entrance. It is in stuccoed stone, the doorway has a chamfered surround, and the windows are sashes.	II
Glen Cottage Hotel; 54.66614°N 2.75437°W	—	17th to 18th century	The hotel is in stuccoed stone, and has a slate roof, hipped on the south side, and two low storeys. In the ground floor are two 19th-century bay windows, and in the upper floor are three sash windows. On the right return is a glazed extension with three sash windows above.	II
1–3 Kitchenhill; 54.69897°N 2.78296°W	—	1714	A row of three red sandstone houses with a stone-flagged roof and two storeys. The central doorway has a shaped, dated and initialled stone lintel, and the windows are sashes.	II
60–62 Stricklandgate; 54.66780°N 2.75778°W	—	1716	The buildings are roughcast with slate roofs, two storeys, and sash windows in plain stone architraves. The oldest is No. 60, which has a doorway with a moulded surround and a dated lintel. There are two windows in the ground floor and three above. Nos. 61 and 62 have quoins, and together have two doors, and three windows in each floor.	II
The Friarage and North Friarage; 54.66396°N 2.74881°W	—	1717	A pair of stuccoed stone house with two storeys. The Friarage has a doorway with a chamfered surround, above which is a datestone, and the windows have two lights with mullions. North Friarage has a panelled door and sash windows.	II*
Beacon Tower; 54.67517°N 2.74388°W		1719	The tower was built on the site of previous beacons. It is square, built in red sandstone, and has a pyramidal roof. On each side is a round-arched opening with a keystone and an iron grill. On the north and south sides are loops, and there is a round-headed doorway on the east side.	I
37, 38 and 39 Great Dockray; 54.66293°N 2.75235°W	—	Early 18th century	These are stuccoed stone shops with a slate roof and two storeys. In the ground floor are two doorways with chamfered surrounds, small square shop windows, and a former segmental-headed coach entrance with an inserted modern door. In the upper floor are windows, some of which are sashes and others are mullioned.	II
21 Stricklandgate; 54.66709°N 2.75546°W	—	Early 18th century	Originally a farmhouse and later a private house, it is in pebbledashed stone and has a slate roof. There are two low storeys and three bays. The mullions have been removed from the windows, which are in plain stone architraves.	II
Barn and stable block, 21 Stricklandgate; 54.66712°N 2.75526°W	—	Early 18th century	The barn and stable are in stone with a stone-flagged roof. They contain a segmental-arched barn entrance, and ventilation slits.	II
20 Victoria Road; 54.66229°N 2.74981°W	—	Early 18th century	The shop, on a corner site, is in stuccoed stone with quoins and a slate roof, and it has two storeys. On the Victoria Road front are two bays, the left bay being gabled. In the ground floor are two shop windows, and in the upper floor are a square sash window and a lancet window. The ground floor of the Old London Road front contains a shop window and a doorway with a pointed arch, and in the upper floor are four sash windows in chamfered stone architraves.	II
Bank House; 54.66837°N 2.75965°W	—	Early 18th century	A pebbledashed stone house with a roof of slate at the front and stone flags at the rear, it has two storeys and a symmetrical three-bay front. Above the central doorway is a lintel with an inscribed, but illegible, panel. The windows are sashes, double in the ground floor and single above. All the openings have stone architraves.	II
Carleton Hall; 54.65570°N 2.73704°W		Early 18th century	Originally a country house and later part of the Cumbria Police Headquarters, it was altered in the late 18th century, restored in 1859, and partly rebuilt in 1937. The building is in stone with slate roofs, and has two storeys and a symmetrical entrance front. The middle three bays are bowed and contain a central doorway, this is flanked by two bays, and outside these are three-bay wings with hipped roofs. At the rear the garden front has a central block of six bays, flanked by canted bay windows. All the windows are sashes.	II*
Carleton Hall Farmhouse; 54.65859°N 2.73216°W	—	Early 18th century	The farmhouse is in red sandstone with rusticated quoins, a cornice, and a stone-flagged roof. There are two storeys and a three-bay front. The central doorway has a moulded surround, five keystones, a moulded cornice, and a pediment. The windows are mullioned.	II*
George Hotel; 54.66431°N 2.75236°W		Early 18th century	The hotel was extended to the south in about 1807, and further to the south in 1924. It is in red sandstone. The northern part has three storeys and six bays. It contains a central carriage entrance with a cornice and a curved pediment. In the ground floor are shop fronts, above them are sash windows in architraves, and at the top is a cornice. The central part has four storeys and three bays. On the front is a Roman Doric porch with a cornice and a balustraded balcony. This is flanked by two-storey canted bay windows, in the second floor are three-light windows, and in the top floor are two lunettes. The southern part has three storeys and five bays, and in the centre is a segmental arch leading to a market hall. The windows are sashes, the central window above the arch having three lights and a pediment.	II*
Masonic Hall; 54.66489°N 2.74886°W	—	Early 18th century	Also called Hutton Hall, the building is in red sandstone on a plinth, with rusticated quoins, a band, a moulded cornice and parapet, and a slate roof with stone copings. There are two storeys and seven bays. On the centre is a doorway with a moulded surround, a cornice, and a segmental pediment on brackets, and the windows are sashes in plain architraves.	II*
1 St Andrew's Place; 54.66378°N 2.75096°W	—	c.1750	The building is in stuccoed stone, with projecting quoins, a moulded cornice, and a slate roof. There are two storeys and basements. The round-headed doorway has three-quarter Doric columns, an entablature, and a pedimented cornice, and above the door is a radial fanlight. In the basement are modern windows, and in the floors above are sash windows in stone architraves. On the left side is a round-arched stair window, and on the right side is a doorway with pilasters and a cornice. In the front are wrought iron railings.	II*
Mansion House; 54.66469°N 2.74982°W	—	1750	A stuccoed stone house with a string course, 2 1/2 storeys and a high basement, and five bays. The doorway has a moulded surround and a segmental pediment with brackets, and the windows are sashes. At each side is a projecting two-storey wing joined to the main block by a Gothic link. The wings contain Venetian windows.	II*
9–11 Albert Street; 54.66553°N 2.75277°W	—	18th century	A row of three houses, roughcast over sandstone, the sandstone exposed at the rear, with a stone-flagged roof, and three storeys. In the ground floor are three doorways, and the windows are sashes, some of them horizontally-sliding. At the rear is a staircase wing.	II
1, 2 and 3 Bishop Yards; 54.66406°N 2.74982°W	—	18th century	A row of three rendered houses of different dates, with quoins and three storeys. No. 1 has a doorway with a moulded architrave, a frieze, and a dentilled and modillioned cornice. The doorway of No. 2 has a plain surround, and No. 3 has a doorway with Doric half-columns, a block entablature and a pedimented cornice. The windows are sashes in plain architraves.	II*
54 Burrowgate; 54.66465°N 2.75251°W	—	18th century	A stuccoed stone house with two storeys and four bays. Four steps lead up to a doorway with a curved pediment. There are two modern windows to the right, a sash window and another doorway to the left, and four sash windows in the upper floor.	II
24 and 25 Corn Market; 54.66365°N 2.75346°W	—	18th century	A pair of red sandstone shops with pilasters, a cornice, and two storeys. In the ground floor are two Edwardian shop fronts, and in the upper floor are seven sash windows in moulded stone architraves.	II
25A Corn Market; 54.66367°N 2.75334°W	—	18th century	A shop in red sandstone with pilasters, a cornice, three storeys and three bays. In the ground floor is a shop front, and to the right is a segmental-arched carriage entrance with a keystone. The windows are sashes in moulded architraves.	II
3 and 4 Devonshire Street; 54.66413°N 2.75275°W	—	18th century	A pair of stone shops with quoins and a slate roof. There are three storeys and each shop has two bays. In the ground floor are shop fronts, and above are sash windows in stone architraves.	II
13 Devonshire Street; 54.66449°N 2.75302°W	—	18th century	A stone building with three storeys and one bay. In the ground floor is a shop front, the middle floor contains a sash windows, and in the top floor is a blocked window.	II
17 and 18 Devonshire Street; 54.66454°N 2.75280°W		18th century	A stone shop with rusticated quoins, a cornice, and three storeys. There are elaborate Victorian shop fronts on the west and south sides, with narrow colonnets and glazed scrolled friezes. On the north and south sides in the ground floor are round-headed windows with moulded surrounds and triple keystones, and the south side contains panels with raised lettering. In the upper floors are sash windows, some with pediments.	II*
23 Devonshire Street; 54.66419°N 2.75220°W	—	18th century	A shop in red sandstone with quoins, three storeys and four bays. In the ground floor is a shop front and an arched yard entry to the right, and in the upper floors are sash windows in plain stone architraves.	II
4 Great Dockray; 54.66280°N 2.75205°W	—	18th century	A stuccoed shop with three storeys and one bay. In the ground floor is a door with a plain architrave, and a shop window to the right, and in each of the upper floors is a sash window.	II
5–7 Great Dockray; 54.66277°N 2.75224°W	—	18th century	A row of three stuccoed shops with a slate roof and two storeys. In the ground floor are two doors with fanlights, and a yard entry. The windows are sashes in plainarchitraves.	II
21 Great Dockray; 54.66270°N 2.75332°W	—	18th century	A stuccoed stone house with two storeys and two bays. In the right of the ground floor is a yard entry with a chamfered surround. To the left is a doorway and a sash window, and in the upper floor are two sash windows; the doorway and windows have plain stone architraves.	II
23–25 Great Dockray; 54.66290°N 2.75348°W	—	18th century	A row consisting of a shop and two houses in stuccoed stone, with two storeys. No. 23, the shop, has a yard entry with a chamfered surround, a door with a fanlight, and sash windows. To the right, Nos. 24 and 25 have long and short quoins, and doors with small fanlights. The doorway of No. 24 has pilasters and a cornice. The windows are sashes, those in the upper floor having cornices.	II
26 Great Dockray; 54.66301°N 2.75355°W	—	18th century	A stuccoed stone house with quoins, three storeys and a symmetrical three-bay front. The central round-headed doorway has a chamfered surround and a semicircular fanlight. The windows are sashes in plain stone architraves. At the right is a yard doorway.	II
36 Great Dockray; 54.66297°N 2.75257°W	—	18th century	A stuccoed stone shop with quoins, a slate roof, and two storeys. The doorway has a chamfered surround, to the left are two windows in moulded architraves, to the right is a shop front and a yard door, and in the upper floor are five sash windows in moulded architraves.	II
9 and 10 King Street; 54.66353°N 2.75105°W	—	18th century	A pebbledashed stone shop with long and short quoins, three storeys and two bays. In the centre of the ground floor is a doorway with pilasters, a cornice and a fanlight, and an Edwardian shop front to the right. Above are sash windows in moulded architraves, double in the middle floor, and single in the top floor. On the left side is a gable, and a wing containing sash windows and an archway with imposts.	II
19, 20, 20A and 21 King Street; 54.66292°N 2.75047°W	—	18th century	A row of stone shops with long and short quoins, a concave cornice, and three storeys. In the ground floor are shop fronts, and a coach entry with a four-centred arched head. In the middle floor are seven sash windows, and in the top floor are two sash windows and five casement windows.	II
26, 27, 27A, 28 and 28A King Street; 54.66242°N 2.75024°W	—	18th century (probable)	A group of roughcast stone shops. No. 26 is on a corner with quoins. It has four storeys, and the other shops have three storeys. In the ground floor are shop fronts and shop windows, and in the upper floors are sash windows.	II
43 and 44 King Street; 54.66334°N 2.75133°W	—	18th century	Two stone shops, each with quoins and three storeys, but of different heights. No. 43 is higher and has a door with a fanlight, a sash window to the left, and a Victorian shop front to the right. In both upper floors there are two sash windows. No. 44, to the right, has an Edwardian shop front in the ground floor, and a double sash window with a mullion in each of the upper floors.	II
48–52 King Street; 54.66355°N 2.75171°W		18th century	A row of stone shop and a public house with three storeys. In the ground floor are modern shop fronts. Most of the windows in the upper floors are sashes, with ten in the top floor and nine in the middle floor, all in plain stone architraves.	II
8 Little Dockray; 54.66426°N 2.75322°W	—	18th century (probable)	A stuccoed shop with a gabled front and two storeys. In the ground floor is a shop front, and above are two sash windows in chamfered stone architraves.	II
9 and 10 Little Dockray; 54.66432°N 2.75330°W	—	18th century	A pair of stuccoed shop with quoins and three low storeys. In the centre is a doorway, and this is flanked by shop fronts. In the middle floor are one double and two single sash windows. and in the top floor are two small casement windows; all the windows have stone architraves.	II
11 and 12 Little Dockray; 54.66441°N 2.75337°W	—	18th century	A pair of shops in stuccoed stone with quoins and two low storeys. In the ground floor is a central yard entry, flanked by shop fronts with pilasters and a continuous fascia and cornice. In the upper floor are double sash windows in plain architraves.	II
19–21 Little Dockray; 54.66441°N 2.75312°W	—	18th century	These are stuccoed shops with three storeys. No. 19 retains some medieval features, it is gabled, and has a doorway and a window with chamfered surrounds in the ground floor, an oriel window in the middle floor, and a two-light mullioned window in the top floor. Nos. 20 and 21 are combined into one shop, with four bays, an Edwardian shop front, and sash windows in stone architraves above.	II
9–11 Market Square; 54.66366°N 2.75247°W	—	18th century	A row of stone shops with three storeys. In the ground floor are late Victorian shop fronts with slender colonnets and pilasters with ornamental capitals. In each upper floor are six sash windows.	II
1 and 2 Middlegate; 54.66462°N 2.75328°W	—	18th century	A stuccoed shop with a stone-flagged roof on a corner site. Part of the shop has two low storeys, an early 20th-century shop front, and two sash windows above. The part on the corner is canted, it has three storeys, a hipped roof, a modern shop front, and a sash window in each floor on both faces.	II
3–5 Middlegate; 54.66474°N 2.75348°W	—	18th century	A row of three stone shops with three storeys and of varying heights, all with modern shop fronts. No. 3 has three sash windows in each upper floor. Between No. 3 and No. 4 is a narrow yard entry. No. 4 projects forward and has one sash window in each floor on the front and on the right side. No. 5 has three sash windows in the middle floor and two in the top floor.	II
11 and 14 Queen Street; 54.66566°N 2.75331°W	—	18th century (probable)	Originally a public house and cottages, later converted into a private house and a restaurant, it is stuccoed. The left part has three storeys, and contains a round-headed doorway with a fanlight, a doorway with a flat head, and sash windows. The wing to the right has two low storeys.	II
24 and 25 Queen Street; 54.66546°N 2.75348°W	—	18th century	The building is stuccoed with quoins, eaves on brackets, a stone-flagged roof, and two low storeys. There are two doors and sash windows. all in plain stone architraves.	II
22–32 Sandgate; 54.66537°N 2.75029°W		18th century	A terrace of stone houses of differing size, some pebbledashed, and some stuccoed. Most have two storeys, but No. 22 has three storeys. No. 18 is a public house, The Druids Arms. Most of the buildings have panelled doors with fanlights and sash windows. No. 23 has a round-arched doorway with imposts and a keystone and a segmental-headed carriage entrance, and No. 31 has a window and door inserted into a former coach entrance.	II
8 St Andrew's Churchyard; 54.66451°N 2.75118°W	—	18th century	A roughcast stone house with a roof partly of slate and partly stone-flagged, with two storeys. There are two doorways, and two sash windows in each floor.	II
9 and 10 St Andrew's Churchyard; 54.66457°N 2.75106°W	—	18th century	A pair of stuccoed stone shops with a roof of slate at the front and stone flags at the rear. There are two storeys, in the ground floor are two small shop fronts, and in the upper floor are three windows of differing types and sizes.	II
1 and 2 St Andrew's Square; 54.66368°N 2.75097°W	—	18th century	A pair of pebbledashed stone houses with three storeys. In the ground floor are two doors and shop fronts, and a segmental arched carriage entrance to the right. There are five sash windows in each of the upper floors, and a round-headed staircase window.	II
Bishop Yards Cottage; 54.66400°N 2.75028°W	—	18th century	A stuccoed stone house with a slate roof and two storeys. There are two sash windows in plain surrounds in each floor.	II
Cross Keys Public House; 54.65999°N 2.73064°W		18th century	The public house is in roughcast stone with a slate roof. There are two low storeys, and the doorway has a chamfered stone surround. There is one casement window, one double sash window with a stone mullion, and the others are single sashes. In the south wall is a Victorian letter box.	II
Dockray Lodge and Salkeld House; 54.66264°N 2.75433°W	—	18th century	The building is in roughcast stone with a slate roof, three storeys, and a central block of three bays. Steps lead up to a central round-headed doorway in the middle floor with imposts, a keystone, and a fanlight. The windows are sashes. To the right is a projecting three-storey gabled wing, and to the left is a two-storey wing with a hipped roof.	II
Gate piers, Gloucester Arms; 54.66317°N 2.75345°W	—	18th century	The gate piers flank the entrance to the forecourt. They are square, in stone, and have cornices and ball finials.	II
Lowther Gardens; 54.66408°N 2.75264°W	—	18th century	A shop in red sandstone with quoins, bands, an eaves cornice and a slate roof. There are three storeys and three bays. In the upper floors are sash windows in architraves. The ground floor is occupied by a Georgian shop front. In the centre are double doors with a traceried fanlight, flanked by curved small-paned windows with panelled Ionic pilasters, a cornice, and a glazed frieze. Above this is a full cornice and a fascia.	II*
Lowther House and barn 54.66877°N 2.76082°W	—	18th century	Originally a farmhouse with a barn adjoining to the left. It is in roughcast stone and has two storeys and sash windows. In the barn is a segmental arch with a keystone. (Note: Street View in March 2009 shows that the barn has been converted for domestic use.)	II
Magistrate's Clerks Office; 54.66410°N 2.74941°W	—	18th century	A stone building with three storeys. It has a panelled door, and the windows are sashes, with two in the ground floor, two in the middle floor, and one in the top floor.	II
Malthouse; 54.66714°N 2.75779°W	—	18th century (possible)	The malt house is in the grounds of Shepherd's Hill. It is a rectangular stone building, and has a stone-flagged roof with a square louvred ventilator. The exterior is plain, but inside are a well, a large stone trough, a furnace, a pierced floor, and brick arched vaulting.	II*
Mostyn Cottage, Mostyn Hall Cottage, and Mostyn Hall; 54.66363°N 2.74876°W	—	18th century	Originally one house, later divided, it is in stuccoed stone, with two storeys and eight bays. The main doorway has pilasters, a frieze and a pediment, and in the ground floor there are three more doorways and a yard entrance. The windows are sashes, and in the left return wall is a 17th-century mullioned window with a hood mould.	II
Gate piers, Mansion House; 54.66427°N 2.74930°W	—	18th century	Flanking the entrance to the forecourt are two stone gate piers. They have rusticated Doric pilasters, moulded capitals, and carved urns.	II*
Premises occupied by Greenholme Construction; 54.66399°N 2.75042°W	—	18th century (probable)	The building is in pebbledashed stone and has two low storeys. There is a round-arched doorway, and the windows are sashes.	II
Shepherd's View and barn 54.66767°N 2.75689°W	—	18th century	Originally a farmhouse and attached barn, later a private house, it is in roughcast stone with a stone-flagged roof and has two storeys. The doorway and sash windows have stone architraves. To the left is an arched stable door and a barn entrance that has a segmental arch with voussoirs, imposts and a keystone.	II
Strickland Hotel; 54.66614°N 2.75418°W	—	18th century	The hotel is stuccoed with stone quoins, and has two storeys. The doorway has attached Doric columns and a cornice. There are three sash windows in the ground floor and four in the upper floor. At the rear are three arched windows, and on the right side is a two-storey canted bay window.	II
Thackagate; 54.67061°N 2.76200°W	—	18th century	A roughcast stone house with two storeys and six bays. The door and porch are modern, and the windows are sashes in plain stone architraves.	II
The Grey Goat Inn; 54.66536°N 2.75126°W		18th century	A public house in pebbledashed stone with quoins. It has two storeys, there is a modern door, and there are three sash windows in stone architraves in each floor.	II
The Last Orders Inn; 54.66496°N 2.75214°W		18th century	The public house, formerly the Dog and Duck Inn, was extended in the 18th century. It is in pebbledashed stone, and has long and short quoins. There are two storeys and four bays. The windows on the front are sashes, and on the right side are two small mullioned windows with moulded surrounds.	II
Tudor Restaurant (King Street front); 54.66376°N 2.75173°W	—	18th century	The shop front was altered in the 20th century. It is stuccoed with long and short quoins, a cornice, and three storeys. In the ground floor are two convex shop windows flanking the doorway, and a fascia above. The middle floor contains wide modern windows, in the top floor are four sash windows, and in the roof is a gabled dormer.	II
Welcome Inn, stable and barn 54.65192°N 2.74230°W	—	18th century	Originally an inn with attached farm buildings, later a private house, it is in stuccoed stone with a slate roof and has two storeys. There is a doorway converted into a window that has an inscribed lintel, above which is an iron plaque. The windows are sashes, two of which have chamfered mullions. To the right is an extension with a sash window in the ground floor and two horizontally-sliding sash windows in the upper floor. To the rear and at right angles are a red sandstone stable and barn with ventilation slits.	II
Woolpack Inn; 54.66470°N 2.75266°W		18th century	The public house is in stuccoed stone, and has two low storeys and a canted corner. In the ground floor is a doorway and a double sash window, and elsewhere are single sash windows.	II
4 Angel Lane; 54.66342°N 2.75246°W	—	1763	A stuccoed stone shop with quoins, string courses, a moulded cornice, a small central segmental pediment, and three storeys. In the ground floor is a shop front, and a double doorway with moulded architraves, a pulvinated frieze, a moulded cornice, a segmental pediment, and an inscribed plaque. In each of the upper floors the central window has two round-headed lights flanked by lower flat-headed lights, and in the middle floor there are also windows with ogee heads.	II*
30–32 Albert Street; 54.66558°N 2.75246°W	—	Late 18th century (probable)	Originally a farmhouse and cottages, No. 30 is stuccoed, with two storeys, a central doorway and two sash windows in each floor, all in plain stone architraves. Nos. 31 and 32 have three storeys, two doorways with chamfered surrounds, and two sash windows in each floor.	II
11 Devonshire Street; 54.66445°N 2.75298°W	—	Late 18th century	A stone shop with a slate roof, three storeys and two bays. In the ground floor is a modern shop front, and above are sash windows.	II
12 Devonshire Street; 54.66447°N 2.75297°W	—	Late 18th century	A shop in red sandstone with four storeys and one bay. In the ground floor is a shop front with a fascia dating from the early 20th century, and in each of the upper floors is a sash window.	II
14–17 Meeting House Lane; 54.66631°N 2.75063°W	—	Late 18th century	Two pairs of stuccoed cottages with roofs partly of slate and partly of stone flags. Nos. 16 and 17 are higher than Nos. 14 and 15. In each pair the doors are central, and most windows are sashes. All the openings have chamfered stone surrounds.	II
17 Queen Street; 54.66590°N 2.75357°W		Late 18th century	A house sited on a junction, with a curved end facing the junction, it is stuccoed and has two storeys. In the curved end are double sash windows in each floor, with an iron grill in front of the lower window. On the Queen Street front is a doorway and two sash windows, and on the Albert Street front is a staircase window and a sash window.	II
Lonsdale House; 54.66641°N 2.75084°W	—	Late 18th century	The house, which is in Gothic style, is stuccoed with a slate roof and two low storeys. In the centre is a doorway and a door with pointed arches. To the left in both storeys is a window with a pointed arch in a stone chamfered architrave. To the right in each floor is two-light window with chamfered mouldings, mullions, and Tudor arched heads.	II
Musgrave Hall; 54.66574°N 2.75461°W		Late 18th century	Originally a private house, later used by The Royal British Legion, it is stuccoed with quoins and has two storeys. The left bay projects and contains sash windows, in the middle block are more sash windows and a blocked doorway with a lintel containing a coat of arms. The right bay projects and has a two-storey bay window with Tuscan columns acting as mullions, a frieze and a cornice. In the right return is a round-headed doorway with imposts, a keystone, and a fanlight.	II
Salutation Hotel; 54.66205°N 2.74990°W	—	Late 18th century	The building is in stuccoed stone, with quoins and a slate roof. There are two storeys and four bays. The two round-arched doorways have imposts and keystones, and the sash windows are in plain stone architraves.	II
Shepherd's Hill; 54.66726°N 2.75751°W	—	Late 18th century	A stuccoed house on a plinth, with stone quoins, two storeys and four bays. The doorway has two Doric columns with block entablatures and a pediment. Above the door is a fanlight, and the windows are sashes.	II*
Waverley Hotel; 54.66255°N 2.75038°W	—	Late 18th century	The hotel is in red sandstone and has three storeys. In the ground floor of the King Street front is a doorway and two sash windows, in the middle floor are two round-arched windows, and the top floor contains two ogee-headed windows. The left hand wing of the Crown Square front is gabled with bargeboards. In the middle floor is a Venetian window and in the top floor is an ogee-headed window. To the right is a lower three-storey wing with sash windows.	II
Corney House; 54.66619°N 2.75367°W	—	1777	A red sandstone house with long and short quoins, bands, and three storeys. It has a symmetrical front of five bays, flanked by single storey wings containing doorways, each of which has Doric attached columns and a cornice. The windows are sashes in stone architraves.	II*
Gate piers, Corney House; 54.66610°N 2.75380°W	—	1777	The pair of stone gate piers at the entrance to the garden are square and rusticated, and are surmounted by cornices.	II
Lingstubs; 54.66249°N 2.78010°W	—	1777	A stuccoed stone house with two low storeys. On the front are two doorways with chamfered surrounds, one with a dated and initialled lintel, and sash windows in stone architraves. At the rear are three gables, and a round-headed stair window.	II
8 Middlegate; 54.66490°N 2.75366°W	—	1786	A stuccoed shop with long and short quoins, three storeys and two bays. In the ground floor is a shop front with a central doorway, and a yard entry to the right. In each upper floor are two sash windows in chamfered stone architraves.	II
1 and 2 Crown Square; 54.66269°N 2.75085°W	—	1792	A stone house with long and short quoins, two storeys and a symmetrical front of three bays. In the centre is a doorway with a moulded architrave, and the windows are sashes.	II
Barco Lodge; 54.66210°N 2.74361°W	—	1797	A stuccoed house on a plinth, with quoins, a slate roof, and three storeys. At the rear is a wing converted from a former stable. The windows are sashes in plain architraves with a small chamfer. In the northwest gable end is a window with a moulded architrave, a frieze, and a moulded cornice.	II
Eamont Lodge and 2 Skirsgill Lane; 54.65166°N 2.74369°W	—	Late Georgian	A pair of stone houses. Eamont Lodge has three storeys, and on the west end is a canted bay window with Tuscan columns, and in each floor above are sash windows. On the front away from the road is a long round-headed sash window. No. 2, to the east, has two storeys and sash windows.	II
Bowscar Mansion; 54.70400°N 2.75462°W	—	Late 18th to early 19th century	A stuccoed house in Georgian Gothic style, with a Victorian extension after 1875. It has a battlemented parapet, and a central doorway flanked by two-storey bay windows containing three-light windows with Tudor arched heads. The other windows are sashes.	II
Barn and farm buildings, Lingstubs; 54.66265°N 2.78023°W	—	Late 18th to early 19th century	On the west side of the courtyard is a long row of stone farm buildings with a roof partly in stone. At right angles to it on the north side is a barn in red sandstone containing a cart entrance with a moulded surround and a depressed arch.	II
Premises occupied by Thornborrow; 54.66389°N 2.75175°W	—	18th to 19th century	A stone building with three storeys and a basement. There are two central doorways, sash windows, a stair window, and iron railings in front of the area.	II
Tynefield House; 54.65980°N 2.74676°W	—	1804	A stone house in Neoclassical style, with a stuccoed front, a red sandstone rear wing, and a hipped slate roof. There are two storeys and a symmetrical front of three bays. The central round-headed doorway has an ornamental fanlight, and the windows are sashes. In the ground floor the windows are tripartite and slightly recessed under segmental arches, and in the upper floor they are single. On the roof is a central chimney stock with eight flues in a line.	II
Methodist Church, Fell Lane; 54.66567°N 2.74955°W	—	1815	The church is stuccoed with quoins, bands, and a parapet. There are two storeys, and three bays on the entrance front and the sides. The doorway is flanked by unfluted Roman Doric three-quarter columns carrying a block entablature and a pediment, and above the door is a semicircular fanlight. The windows on the front and sides in both storeys are round-headed.	II
Caroline Cottage; 54.67177°N 2.74290°W	—	1818	A house in stone rubble with sandstone dressings and a battlemented parapet. In the centre is a two-storey tower containing windows with four-centred arched heads. This is flanked by single-storey wings, each with a square headed window containing a wooden casement window with a pointed head. On the east side is a bay window.	II
Abbots Bank; 54.66425°N 2.74860°W	—	1820	A stuccoed stone house with quoins, a cornice, a parapet, and a slate roof. There are two storeys with an attic, and a symmetrical front of three bays. In the centre is a portico with two Tuscan columns, a frieze and a cornice, and above the door is a semicircular fanlight. The windows are sashes in plain stone architraves. On the left side is a round-headed attic window, and at the rear is a round-headed staircase window.	II*
60 Arthur Street; 54.66805°N 2.74997°W	—	Early 19th century	A stuccoed house with a moulded and dentilled cornice. There are two storeys and a symmetrical front of three bays. The central round-arched doorway has imposts and a fanlight. The windows are sashes in architraves.	II
65–68 Arthur Street; 54.66897°N 2.74886°W	—	Early 19th century	A row of four houses, Nos. 65 and 66 are stuccoed, and Nos. 67 and 68 are pebbledashed. They have red sandstone quoins, and two storeys. Each pair of houses has central doorways with pilasters and cornices, and the windows are sashes.	II
18 Brunswick Square; 54.66652°N 2.75700°W	—	Early 19th century	A pebbledashed cottage with end pilasters, two storeys and a symmetrical three-bay front. In the centre is a doorway with a fanlight containing Gothic tracery. The windows are casements in stone architraves.	II
8 Great Dockray; 54.66272°N 2.75247°W	—	Early 19th century	A stuccoed building with three storeys and two bays. Above the door is a fanlight, and the windows are sashes in plain stone architraves.	II
12 and 13 Hunter's Lane; 54.66682°N 2.75206°W	—	Early 19th century	A pair of roughcast houses with a stone-flagged roof and two storeys. In the ground floor is a garage entrance to the left, two modern doors, and five windows. In the upper floor are six windows, one being a round-headed staircase window. All the other windows are sashes.	II
30, 30A and 31 King Street; 54.66277°N 2.75069°W	—	Early 19th century	Two shops on a corner site in stone with a curved corner, a hipped roof, and three storeys. In the ground floor are shop fronts and the door to a flat, and in the upper floors are sash windows.	II
6 and 7 Middlegate; 54.66483°N 2.75359°W	—	Early 19th century	A pair of stuccoed shops with three storeys. In the centre of the ground floor is a yard entry. This is flanked by shop fronts, and there are three windows in each of the upper floors.	II
19–22 Queen Street; 54.66584°N 2.75378°W	—	Early 19th century (probable)	A terrace of four pebbledashed houses with a roof of stone and slate, and two low storeys. No. 20 has a four-centred arched doorway, and the other houses have plain doorways. Nos. 19 and 20 have mullioned windows; Nos. 21 and 22 have sash windows.	II
11 and 12 West Lane; 54.66233°N 2.75381°W	—	Early 19th century	A pair of stuccoed houses with two storeys. The front facing the rear was originally the rear, and it contains two modern doors and two round-headed staircase windows. The main doorways have a common doorcase with pilasters and a cornice, and the windows are sashes, all in red sandstone architraves.	II
Altham's Iron Works; 54.66544°N 2.75227°W	—	Early 19th century	The building is in sandstone with three storeys. In the ground floor is a cart entrance that has a segmental arch with imposts, and in the centre of the top floor is a taking-in door. The windows are small-paned, with two on the ground floor, three in the middle floor, and two on the top floor.	II
Carleton Hill; 54.66404°N 2.72380°W	—	Early 19th century	A house in late Georgian Gothic style, with two storeys, once the residence of Anthony Trollope. On the entrance front is a shallow porch with a pointed arch, a Gothic doorway, and mullioned and transomed windows. The garden front has three two-storey bay windows, again containing mullioned and transomed windows.	II
Cold Springs; 54.66781°N 2.73811°W	—	Early 19th century	Originally a hunting lodge, later divided into two dwellings, it has a stuccoed front and two storeys. The centre is gabled and has a doorway with a pointed arch. Flanking this are two two-light windows with round-headed lights and hood moulds in each floor, and outside this on each side is a three-storey tower with similar three-light windows. At the rear are a coach house, a barn, a stable, and a loft approached by external steps; these are in two ranges, forming three sides of a courtyard, which is cobbled.	II
Conservative Club; 54.66243°N 2.75083°W	—	Early 19th century	The building is in ashlar with bands, a slate roof, three storeys, and a symmetrical three-bay front. The central doorway has pilasters and a cornice, and the windows are sashes.	II
The Dog Beck; 54.66186°N 2.75038°W	—	Early 19th century	A roughcast restaurant with quoins, a hipped slate roof, and two storeys. The central doorway is flanked by two-storey bay windows containing sash windows, Tuscan half-columns, and a plain frieze. On the right side are double sash windows.	II
Fellside and The Flat; 54.67037°N 2.74709°W	—	Early 19th century	Originally one house, later divided into two dwellings, it is roughcast on a rusticated plinth, and has red sandstone quoins and architraves. There are two storeys. The doorway has a semicircular head and a fanlight, and at the rear is a round-headed stair window.	II
Grapes Public House; 54.66285°N 2.75079°W	—	Early 19th century	The former public house is in roughcast stone, with three storeys and two bays. In the ground floor is a doorway with pilasters, a fascia and a cornice. The middle floor contains two oriel windows, and in the top floor are two sash windows.	II
Lark Hall; 54.67005°N 2.76061°W	—	Early 19th century	The house is in stuccoed stone with quoins, and it has two storeys and three bays. In the centre is a red sandstone porch with two Doric columns and an entablature. The windows are sashes in plain stone surrounds.	II
Lowther Arms and 4 Queen Street; 54.66531°N 2.75328°W		Early 19th century	A public house on a corner site and an adjoining shop, they are stuccoed, with quoins and three storeys. In the ground floor the public house has a doorway with a chamfered stone architrave and a fanlight, and the shop has a shop front and a yard entry. In the upper floor are sash windows.	II
Potters Lodge; 54.66946°N 2.74464°W	—	Early 19th century	Originally a single house, later divided into two dwellings, it is rendered with quoins, a slate roof, and two storeys. There are two doorways in the centre of the front, the windows are sashes, and at the rear are two round-headed stair windows. All the openings have plain stone surrounds.	II
Prince Albert House; 54.66547°N 2.75255°W	—	Early 19th century	This originated as a workhouse, and is in stuccoed stone with blocked cornice eaves, three storeys and six bays. The doorway has pilasters and a cornice. The windows are sashes in moulded architraves, those in the middle floor having cornices on brackets.	II
Rutherford House; 54.67056°N 2.76127°W	—	Early 19th century	A stuccoed stone house on a plinth, with quoins, a band, and a slate roof. There are two storeys and a symmetrical front of three bays. Four steps lead up to the central round-headed doorway that has fluted attached half-columns and a semicircular fanlight. The windows are sashes in plain architraves.	II
St Andrew's Bookshop; 54.66478°N 2.75082°W	—	Early 19th century	The shop is in pebbledashed stone, and has three storeys. In the ground floor is a modern shop front, and in each of the upper floors are two sash windows in stone architraves.	II
Stoney Beck Inn and integral farm buildings 54.69887°N 2.76951°W	—	Early 19th century	The porch was added in 1867. The building is in pebbledashed stone and has two storeys. To the left are farm buildings that have been incorporated in the inn. The windows are sashes in chamfered stone architraves.	II
Toll Bar Cottage; 54.65385°N 2.74278°W	—	Early 19th century	A roughcast cottage with a slate roof, a single storey and a rear wing. The windows are modern, in stone architraves.	II
The Vicarage; 54.66600°N 2.74877°W	—	Early 19th century	A stone house with quoins, a hipped roof and two storeys. On the front is a rectangular porch carried on panelled wooden piers. The doorway has an architrave, a cornice, and a rectangular fanlight, and the windows are sashes.	II
Victoria Cottage; 54.66158°N 2.74318°W	—	Early 19th century	A stuccoed stone house with projecting quoins, a hipped roof, two storeys and three bays. The windows on the west front are mullioned, they have four-centred arched heads, and above them are hood moulds.	II
White Horse Public House; 54.66260°N 2.75276°W		Early 19th century	The public house is in pebbledashed stone, and has three storeys and four bays. The entrance has a segmental arch, and the windows are sashes in plain stone architraves. In the ground floor is an inserted three-light window.	II
Crozier Lodge; 54.66606°N 2.74952°W	—	1826	A stone house with a string course and a moulded cornice. There are two storeys, a symmetrical three-bays front flanked by single-storey single-bay pavilions. The central doorway has Doric columns with block entablatures and a pedimented cornice, and the windows are sashes. The pavilions have central doors with small flanking windows in Palladian style. All three doors have round-headed fanlights.	II
7–10 Devonshire Street; 54.66432°N 2.75290°W	—	1828	Originally one building, later divided into shops, it is in ashlar with bands, a cornice, and a parapet. There are four storeys and four bays. In the centre of the ground floor is a round-headed doorway with a semicircular fanlight, and this is flanked by shop fronts. In the left bay of the first floor is an oriel window, and the other windows are sashes.	II
Inglewood Inn Farmhouse and farm buildings 54.69175°N 2.76701°W	—	1828	The farmhouse and farm buildings are in stone. The farmhouse has three storeys, a central doorway, and two windows in each floor in stone architraves, three of which are casements. At the rear is a round-arched stair window. Attached to the east are a barn and byre with a round-arched window.	II
Hill House and coach house 54.67038°N 2.74384°W	—	1829	The house is in roughcast stone with a slate roof, and has two storeys. The doorway has a rectangular fanlight, the windows are sashes, and all have stone architraves. In the gable end facing the road is a round-headed staircase window. To the rear, and forming an L-shaped plan, is a red sandstone coach house with a depressed rusticated arch.	II
Roundthorn Hotel; 54.67215°N 2.72176°W	—	c. 1830	The hotel is stuccoed, on a plinth, and has quoins, a dentilled wood cornice, and a hipped roof. There are two storeys and a symmetrical front of four bays. In the centre is a segmental stone portico with four unfluted Ionic columns and an entablature. Above the door is a traceried fanlight, and the windows are sashes in architraves.	II
Infant School; 54.66623°N 2.75046°W	—	1833	The school is in red sandstone with a slate roof and it has a single storey. On the front facing the road are two single sash windows and one double sash. There is a long wing at the rear containing the entrance.	II
Maiden Hill; 54.69034°N 2.74736°W	—	c. 1840	A roughcast stone house with a hipped slate roof. There are two storeys and five bays, and on the front is a later square porch.	II
Monument to railway contractors 54.66440°N 2.75098°W	—	1846	The monument is in the churchyard of St Andrew's Church to commemorate the contractors of the Lancaster and Carlisle Railway. It is in Victorian Gothic style, and consists of two rectangular piers each containing an inscribed pointed-arched panel and surmounted by a crocketed finial. Between the piers is Perpendicular tracery with an ogee arch and a foliated finial.	II
Railway station 54.66185°N 2.75861°W		1846	The station was built for the Lancaster and Carlisle Railway and designed by Sir William Tite in Tudor Gothic style. It is built in stone, it has a single storey, and consists of a central block flanked by unequal gabled wings. The central block contains an entrance with a Tudor arched head and mullioned windows. In the wings the windows are mullioned and transomed. An island platform was added in 1860.	II
Christ Church; 54.66761°N 2.75543°W		1848–50	The chancel was remodelled in 1905. The church is in red sandstone with slate roofs, and consists of a nave, north and south aisles, a south porch, and a chancel. On the west gable is a belfry with a spirelet. The windows contain Perpendicular tracery.	II
26–29 Albert Street; 54.66567°N 2.75270°W	—	Mid 19th century	A row of four stone houses with three storeys, and two bays each. The doorways have unfluted Roman Doric attached columns, hollow-chamfered round-headed arches, and semicircular fanlights. The windows are sashes.	II
19 and 20 Arthur Street; 54.66777°N 2.75077°W	—	Mid 19th century	A pair of sandstone houses with quoins and two storeys. The doorways are paired in the centre, and have pilasters, small rectangular fanlights, and a cornice. The windows are sashes.	II
21 Arthur Street; 54.66809°N 2.75069°W	—	Mid 19th century	A grey sandstone house in Greek Revival style on a plinth, with full-height angle pilasters, a band, an eaves cornice, and a hipped roof. It has two storeys and a symmetrical front of three bays. In the centre is a porch with two Doric columns, a plain frieze and a cornice. The windows are sashes in moulded stone architraves.	II
30 and 31 Arthur Street; 54.66863°N 2.74972°W	—	19th century	A house to which a Victorian plaster front has been added, and which has channelled joints to resemble masonry. It has two storeys and a symmetrical three-bay front. There are full height ornate Corinthian pilasters, a dentilled cornice, and moulded surrounds to the central doorway and the sash windows.	II
48, 49 and 50 Arthur Street; 54.66755°N 2.75058°W	—	Mid 19th century	A row of three houses in red sandstone, with moulded eaves on brackets. There are two storeys and each house has two bays. The doorways are round-headed with hollow-chamfered surrounds, and above the doors are traceried fanlights. The windows are sashes, one in each ground floor, and two in the upper floors.	II
53, 54 and 55 Arthur Street; 54.66784°N 2.75022°W	—	Mid 19th century	A row of three sandstone houses on a plinth, with quoins, eaves on brackets, and two storeys. The doorways have imposts and round-headed fanlights with delicate tracery. Each house has a single-storey canted bay window with a cornice, and in the upper floor are five windows in stone architraves; all the windows are sashes.	II
61, 62, 63 and 63B Arthur Street; 54.66815°N 2.74982°W	—	Mid 19th century	A row of three houses in red sandstone with quoins and blocked eaves. They have two storeys and semi-basements, and each house has two bays. Steps lead up to the doorways that have pilasters, small fanlights, and cornices. The windows are sashes in stone architraves.	II
41 and 42 King Street; 54.66321°N 2.75120°W	—	Mid 19th century	A pair of buildings in red sandstone with quoins, bands, and a pierced parapet. There are three storeys and six bays. The ground floor is rusticated, and contains sash windows with segmental heads, and doorways in the outer bays. The other windows are also sashes, in the middle floor they have round heads and small balconies, and in the top floor they have segmental heads, and all have hood moulds.	II
46 King Street; 54.66344°N 2.75150°W	—	Mid 19th century	A red sandstone shop with eaves modillions, a slate roof, and three storeys. In the ground and middle floor are cast iron columns. The ground floor contains a shop front with flat heads, and in the middle floor are arched windows. In both floors are continuous hood moulds, and in top floor are two sash windows with segmental heads.	II
4–6 Little Dockray and The General Wolfe Inn; 54.66414°N 2.75314°W	—	19th century	A row of shops and a public house, they are in stuccoed stone, and have three storeys. In the ground floor of the shops are inserted shop fronts, and the public house has a panelled door. In the upper storeys are sash windows, some of which are double.	II
7 Queen Street, coach house and stable 54.66552°N 2.75313°W	—	19th century	The house is stuccoed with three storeys and three bays. The doorway has a chamfered architrave. The right bay is gabled, in the ground floor is a double sash window with a hood mould, the middle floor contains a canted oriel window with a battlemented parapet, and in the top floor is a two-light mullioned window. To the left are the former coach house and stable, containing a segmental-arched coach entrance with a keystone, and a rectangular oriel window.	II
2–4 St Andrew's Churchyard; 54.66425°N 2.75171°W	—	19th century	A row of three roughcast stone houses of differing sizes with two storeys. No. 2 has a sash window and a modern window in the ground floor, and three sash windows in the upper floor; No. 3 has a central doorway, two windows in the ground floor and five in the upper floor, all with cornices; and No. 4 has one window in each floor.	II
11 and 12 St Andrew's Churchyard; 54.66463°N 2.75094°W	—	19th century	A pair of red sandstone buildings with three storeys, panelled doors, and sash windows. No. 12 also has eaves on brackets, windows with curved heads, and two shop windows.	II
1–8 Wordsworth Terrace; 54.66754°N 2.75325°W	—	Mid 19th century	A terrace of eight houses in red sandstone with quoins, blocked eaves, a slate roof, and two storeys. The doorways have round arches, and above each door is a semicircular fanlight with delicate iron tracery. The windows are sashes in plain stone architraves. Between Nos. 5 and 6 is a round-arched yard entry.	II
Ash Grove; 54.66387°N 2.76299°W	—	Mid 19th century	A stuccoed house with a hipped slate roof and two storeys. On the garden front is a canted bay window, and on the garden front is a porch and a wing. All the windows are sashes in stone architraves.	II
Board and Elbow public house 54.66332°N 2.75325°W		Mid 19th century	The public house, on a corner site, is in red sandstone, partly stuccoed, with three storeys, and is in Gothic style. On the Corn Market front is a two-storey oriel window with pointed arched lights and stone mullions. These are flanked by Gothic-style windows, those in the top floor having pointed heads. On the Great Dockray front is a doorway and sash windows.	II
Candia; 54.66025°N 2.73033°W	—	Mid 19th century	A sandstone house with quoins and a slate roof. It is in Gothic style, and has two storeys and three bays. The porch is gabled with a pointed arch, and above the door is a fanlight, also with a pointed arch. The windows have two lights, and in the ground floor they have hood moulds. In the upper floor are three gabled half-dormers. The gables of the porch and the half-dormers have ornamented bargeboards.	II
Former Frenchfield Farmhouse; 54.65939°N 2.72310°W	—	Mid 19th century	The farmhouse is in stuccoed stone with quoins, an eaves cornice, and two storeys. On the front is a modern timber porch, and above the door is a small fanlight. The windows are sashes in stone architraves, the double sashes having stone mullions.	II
Outbuildings and cattle shed, Frenchfield Farm; 54.65961°N 2.72259°W	—	Mid 19th century	The farm buildings and cattle shed form a square courtyard plan. They are in stone with slate roofs, and include a sequence of blocked segmental-arched sheds.	II
Kitchenhill Bridge; 54.69962°N 2.78100°W		19th century (probable)	The bridge carries a road over River Petteril. It is in sandstone and consists of three segmental arches. The bridge has a plain string course and a solid parapet.	II
North Bank; 54.65166°N 2.74677°W	—	Mid 19th century	A cottage in Victorian Gothic style, roughcast, with long and short quoins, and a hipped slate roof. It is symmetrical with a single storey. The central round-headed doorway has a Tuscan doorcase with attached columns and an open pediment. Above the door is a radial fanlight. On each side of the doorway are three-light windows with Tudor arches, mullions, and square heads. Flanking the house are lower wings with similar two-light windows.	II
Premises occupied by Harrison Granger and Fairer; 54.66376°N 2.75141°W	—	19th century	A red sandstone building with two storeys. The central doorway has a segmental head, a fanlight, and a curved cornice on brackets. The windows are sashes, some single and some double.	II
Premises occupied by Jackson, butcher 54.66484°N 2.75076°W	—	Mid 19th century	A red sandstone shop on a corner site, with a curved corner, full-height pilasters, and moulded string courses, the lower one on brackets. There are three storeys, two bays on de Whelpdale's Lane, and one on Burrowgate. On the corner is a curved doorway, and there is another doorway on de Whelpdale's Lane. In the ground floor on both faces is a shop window with two round arches, slender colonnets, and decorated spandrels, and in the upper floors are sash windows. (Note: Street View in March 2009 shows that at time the premises were occupied by Absolute Escapes.)	II
Virginia; 54.66887°N 2.74955°W	—	Mid 19th century	A red sandstone house with quoins and a cornice. There are two storeys, three bays, and a lower two-storey two-bay wing to the right. The central doorway has a moulded surround, a rectangular fanlight, a cornice, and a pediment on brackets. The windows are sashes.	II
Alma House and Alma Cottage; 54.67292°N 2.75222°W	—	1854	These were originally a public house and attached stable, and are on a corner site. The house is stuccoed with quoins, blocked eaves and a slate roof. There are two storeys and a basement, and each front has three bays. On the Graham Street front steps with railings lead up to a central doorway with pilasters, a small fanlight and a cornice. The Beacon Road front is gabled and has another door and a datestone. The stable was converted into a cottage in about 1890. It has two storeys and three bays, and above the ground floor door and windows is a continuous hood mould. All the windows are sashes in plain architraves.	II
Outwood, stable and coach-house 54.66864°N 2.74894°W	—	1855	A house with an entrance front in grey ashlar and the front facing the road in red sandstone. It is on a plinth and has grey ashlar quoins, an eaves cornice, and a hipped roof. There are two storeys, and the entrance front has three bays. The doorway has a moulded surround, and the windows are sashes in moulded architraves, those in the ground floor also with cornices. Attached to the rear are a stable and coach house in red sandstone.	II
Former Grammar School; 54.66442°N 2.75153°W		1857	The former grammar school, later used as a library, is in red sandstone with a slate roof, and has a single storey. Along the sides are five three-light windows with mullions and transoms and pointed arched heads. The doorway has a segmental arch. On the roof is a square timber belfry set diagonally with Gothic openings and a broach spirelet.	II
Clock tower 54.66393°N 2.75228°W		1861	The clock tower stands in the centre of Market Square. It is in grey ashlar stone, and is square. At the base are stepped corner buttresses, and a trefoil arch on each face. From the base is a shaft with corner pilasters, rising to form a pointed arch containing a clock face. Above this is a gable and a pyramidal roof with a finial.	II
12 and 13 Albert Street; 54.66559°N 2.75293°W	—	Mid to late 19th century	A pair of houses in Victorian Gothic style, stuccoed, with blocked eaves and two storeys. The windows have two or three lights, with chamfered mullions and hood moulds.	II
United Reformed Church; 54.66639°N 2.75577°W		1865	Originally a Congregational church, it was designed by George Webster in Decorated style. The church is built in red sandstone with slate roofs. Facing the street is a large gabled front containing double doors and a large windows with Geometric tracery, To the right is a two-stage tower with a bell stage and a short broach spire, and to the right of this is a two-storey wing with a three-light window in each floor.	II
Cemetery gateway 54.67318°N 2.75010°W	—	1872	The gateway is symmetrical and in Gothic style. In the centre is a tower containing an archway, with buttresses, a bell stage, and a spire with corner spirelets. The tower is flanked by chapels, each having a gable with a finial, and containing a three-light window with plate tracery. Outside each chapel is a gabled porch.	II
Cemetery lodge 54.67289°N 2.75045°W	—	1872	The lodge is built in red sandstone and is in late Victorian Gothic style. It has two storeys with gables and a T-shaped plan. In the angle facing the entrance is a gabled porch that has a doorway with a pointed arch. The windows are mullioned, some with trefoil heads, and others with pointed arches.	II
Methodist Church, Drover Lane; 54.66780°N 2.75392°W	—	1873	The church is in Italianate style, and is built in red sandstone with rusticated quoin pilasters, bands, and a slate roof. There are two storeys, the front has three bays, and there are seven bays along the sides. The entrance front has steps leading up to double doors with a Corinthian surround, above is a triple-arched windows, and at the top is a pediment containing an oculus. Along the sides are two tiers of windows, the upper ones with semicircular heads, and the lower ones with square heads.	II
5 and 6 Devonshire Street; 54.66423°N 2.75277°W	—	Late 19th century	A shop in red sandstone with blocked eaves, a slate roof, and an Edwardian shop front. There are three storeys and four bays. In the top floor are four windows over a band, and flanking the lower two floors are pilasters. The middle floor is glazed, and has a central pilaster, a cornice, two large three-light windows with iron mullions, capitals, bases, and curved heads. In the ground floor are two doors, and shop windows with iron mullions.	II
3 Little Dockray; 54.66409°N 2.75311°W	—	Late 19th century	The building is in red sandstone, with bands, drip moulds, and a cornice. There are three storeys and two bays. In the ground floor is a porch with plain columns, and to the right is a three-light arched window. The middle floor contains a paired window to the left and an oriel window to the right, and in the top floor are two paired sash windows. In the front are cast iron railings.	II
Fern Bank; 54.67307°N 2.75284°W	—	Late 19th century	A roughcast house in Gothic style, with quoins, a slate roof, two storeys and four bays. The first and second bays are gabled with ornamental bargeboards, and in the second bay is a porch with a pointed arch. In the third bay is a stair window with a pointed arch, and the other windows are sashes. In the garden front are two single-storey bay windows.	II
Town Hall; 54.66667°N 2.75446°W		1905–06	The town hall was adapted from two Classical houses of 1791. It is built in red sandstone from Lazonby and buff sandstone from Stanton Moor, and the roof is in Lakeland slate. The building is in Italian Renaissance style, it has a rectangular plan with a rear wing, and there are two storeys, a partial attic and a partial basement, and an asymmetrical front of six bays. The entrance is in the fourth bay, and has a Corinthian porch with a balustrade. Other features include a bay window in the second bay, mullioned and transomed windows, a balustraded parapet, and on the roof is a timber cupola with a lead roof.	II
Boer War Memorial; 54.66078°N 2.75653°W		1906	The memorial stands in Castle Park, and is in granite. It consists of a three-stepped base, a tapered plinth with draped cartouches and a cornice, and a scrolled step on which is a bronze female figure holding a laurel wreath. On the plinth is an inscription and the names of those lost in the Boer War.	II
Barclays Bank; 54.66395°N 2.75197°W		1912–13	The bank, on a corner site, is in Tudor style, and is built in red sandstone. There are three storeys and a canted bay on the corner. The entrance is in the corner bay and has a Tudor arched doorway, above which are oriels in both storeys with round-headed windows. Elsewhere are embattled oriels, mullioned and transomed windows, battlemented turrets, and four copper-covered spirelets.	II
War memorial, St Andrew's Church; 54.66402°N 2.75178°W	—	1919	The war memorial is in the churchyard, it is in sandstone and consists of a tall Celtic cross on a small stepped pedestal. There is ornate carving on both faces of the cross head, and inscriptions around the base of the shaft.	II
War Memorial Gate, Castle Park; 54.66159°N 2.75775°W	—	1923	The war memorial is in the form of a sandstone gabled archway at the entrance to the park. The arch is chamfered and inscribed, above it is a hood mould and a dated plaque, and it is flanked by stepped and coped buttresses. On each side of the archway are canted bays forming pavilions containing mullioned windows. Inside the arch are bronze plaques with inscriptions and the names of those lost in the two World Wars.	II
Telephone kiosk 54.66184°N 2.75857°W		1935	A K6 type telephone kiosk outside Penrith railway station, designed by Giles Gilbert Scott. Constructed in cast iron with a square plan and a dome, it has three unperforated crowns in the top panels.	II
Screen walls, Mansion House; 54.66425°N 2.74936°W	—	Undated	The screen walls of the forecourt of the Mansion House have moulded parapets and contain niches with ogee heads.	II
Gate piers, Shepherd's Hill; 54.66754°N 2.75698°W	—	Undated	The stone gate piers are at the former entrance to the drive. They are square, and have cornices.	II

== Notes and references ==
=== Sources ===
- Historic England, "Parish Church of St Andrew, Penrith (1145048)", National Heritage List for England
- Historic England, "Hutton Hall, Penrith (1326922)", National Heritage List for England
- Historic England, "Penrith Castle, Penrith (1138256)", National Heritage List for England
- Historic England, "Eamont Bridge, Penrith (1145133)", National Heritage List for England
- Historic England, "Eamont Bridge, Penrith (1007193)", National Heritage List for England
- Historic England, "Gloucester Arms, Penrith (1312065)", National Heritage List for England
- Historic England, "Tudor Restaurant, Penrith (1145054)", National Heritage List for England
- Historic England, "Plague stone in grounds of Greengarth old people's home, Penrith (1137825)", National Heritage List for England
- Historic England, "Nos. 13, 14 and 15 Sandgate, Penrith (1145056)", National Heritage List for England
- Historic England, "Nos. 6 to 12 Corn Market, Penrith (1145121)", National Heritage List for England
- Historic England, "Bowerbank Hall, Penrith (1326939)", National Heritage List for England
- Historic England, "Tudor Cottage, Penrith (1138170)", National Heritage List for England
- Historic England, "Two Lions Public House and integral stables, Penrith (1312062)", National Heritage List for England
- Historic England, "Cockell House, Penrith (1326920)", National Heritage List for England
- Historic England, "No. 12 King Street, Penrith (1145070)", National Heritage List for England
- Historic England, "Tourist Information Centre, Penrith (1311984)", National Heritage List for England
- Historic England, "Nos. 45 and 46 Burrowgate, Penrith (1145114)", National Heritage List for England
- Historic England, "Friends' Meeting House, Penrith (1326914)", National Heritage List for England
- Historic England, "Glen Cottage Hotel, Penrith (1326894)", National Heritage List for England
- Historic England, "Nos. 1 to 3 Kitchenhill, Penrith (1326911)", National Heritage List for England
- Historic England, "Nos. 60 to 62 Stricklandgate, Penrith (1145061)", National Heritage List for England
- Historic England, "The Friarage and North Friarage, Penrith (1145096)", National Heritage List for England
- Historic England, "Beacon Tower, Penrith (1326889)", National Heritage List for England
- Historic England, "Nos. 37, 38 and 39 Great Dockray, Penrith (1326886)", National Heritage List for England
- Historic England, "No. 21 Stricklandgate, Penrith (1138227)", National Heritage List for England
- Historic England, "Barn and stable block to south-east of No. 21 Stricklandgate, Penrith (1326941)", National Heritage List for England
- Historic England, "No. 20 Victoria Road, Penrith (1145064)", National Heritage List for England
- Historic England, "Bank House, Penrith (1312057)", National Heritage List for England
- Historic England, "Carleton Hall (Cumbria Police Headquarters), Penrith (1312133)", National Heritage List for England
- Historic England, "Carleton Hall Farmhouse, Penrith (1326892)", National Heritage List for England
- Historic England, "The George Hotel and Nos. 19, 20 and 21 Devonshire Street, Penrith (1145087)", National Heritage List for England
- Historic England, "Masonic Hall, Penrith (1312059)", National Heritage List for England
- Historic England, "No. 1 St Andrew's Place, Penrith (1138160)", National Heritage List for England
- Historic England, "Mansion House, Penrith (1145109)", National Heritage List for England
- Historic England, "Nos. 9, 10 and 11 Albert Street, Penrith (1145136)", National Heritage List for England
- Historic England, "Nos. 1, 2 and 3 Bishop Yards, Penrith (1326890)", National Heritage List for England
- Historic England, "No. 54 Burrowgate, Penrith (1145115)", National Heritage List for England
- Historic England, "Nos. 24 and 25 Corn Market, Penrith (1137872)", National Heritage List for England
- Historic England, "No. 25A Corn Market, Penrith (1326895)", National Heritage List for England
- Historic England, "Nos. 3 and 4 Devonshire Street, Penrith (1145124)", National Heritage List for England
- Historic England, "No. 13 Devonshire Street, Penrith (1326918)", National Heritage List for England
- Historic England, "Nos. 17 and 18 Devonshire Street, Penrith (1145086)", National Heritage List for England
- Historic England, "No. 23 Devonshire Street, Penrith (1326919)", National Heritage List for England
- Historic England, "No. 4 Great Dockray, Penrith (1137943)", National Heritage List for England
- Historic England, "Nos. 5, 6 and 7 Great Dockray, Penrith (1145098)", National Heritage List for England
- Historic England, "No. 21 Great Dockray, Penrith (1137950)", National Heritage List for England
- Historic England, "Nos. 23, 24 and 25 Great Dockray, Penrith (1145100)", National Heritage List for England
- Historic England, "No. 26 Great Dockray, Penrith (1326885)", National Heritage List for England
- Historic England, "No. 36 Great Dockray, Penrith (1312074)", National Heritage List for England
- Historic England, "Nos. 9 and 10 King Street, Penrith (1145069)", National Heritage List for England
- Historic England, "Nos. 19, 20, 20A and 21 King Street, Penrith (1145071)", National Heritage List for England
- Historic England, "Nos. 26, 27, 27A, 28 and 28A King Street, Penrith (1145072)", National Heritage List for England
- Historic England, "Nos. 43 and 44 King Street, Penrith (1138031)", National Heritage List for England
- Historic England, "Nos. 48 to 52 King Street, Penrith (1138038)", National Heritage List for England
- Historic England, "No. 8 Little Dockray, Penrith (1312034)", National Heritage List for England
- Historic England, "Nos. 9 and 10 Little Dockray, Penrith (1326912)", National Heritage List for England
- Historic England, "Nos. 11 and 12 Little Dockray, Penrith (1145078)", National Heritage List for England
- Historic England, "Nos. 19 to 21 Little Dockray, Penrith (1312035)", National Heritage List for England
- Historic England, "Nos. 9 to 11 Market Place, Penrith (1145079)", National Heritage List for England
- Historic England, "Nos. 1 and 2 Middlegate, Penrith (1145081)", National Heritage List for England
- Historic England, "Nos. 3 to 5 Middlegate, Penrith (1326915)", National Heritage List for England
- Historic England, "Nos. 11 and 14 Queen Street, Penrith (1145085)", National Heritage List for England
- Historic England, "Nos. 24 and 25 Queen Street, Penrith (1145045)", National Heritage List for England
- Historic England, "Nos. 22 to 27, The Druid's Head, and 29 to 32 Sandgate, Penrith (1145057)", National Heritage List for England
- Historic England, "No. 8 St Andrew's Churchyard, Penrith (1311964)", National Heritage List for England
- Historic England, "Nos. 9 and 10 St Andrew's Churchyard, Penrith (1145052)", National Heritage List for England
- Historic England, "Nos. 1 and 2 St Andrew's Square, Penrith (1138179)", National Heritage List for England
- Historic England, "Bishop Yards Cottage, Penrith (1145108)", National Heritage List for England
- Historic England, "Cross Keys Public House, Penrith (1145117)", National Heritage List for England
- Historic England, "Dockray Lodge Salkeld House, Penrith (1145090)", National Heritage List for England
- Historic England, "Gate piers in forecourt of the Gloucester Arms, Penrith (1145101)", National Heritage List for England
- Historic England, "Lowther Gardens, Penrith (1137877)", National Heritage List for England
- Historic England, "Lowther House and integral barn, Penrith (1326921)", National Heritage List for England
- Historic England, "Magistrate's Clerks Office, Penrith (1145107)", National Heritage List for England
- Historic England, "Malthouse in grounds of Shepherd's Hill, Penrith (1145062)", National Heritage List for England
- Historic England, "Mostyn Cottage, Mostyn Hall Cottage, and Mostyn Hall, Penrith (1312058)", National Heritage List for England
- Historic England, "Two gate piers to the forecourt of the Mansion House, Penrith (1145110)", National Heritage List for England
- Historic England, "Premises occupied by office of Greenholme Construction Company Limited, Penrith (1326891)", National Heritage List for England
- Historic England, "Shepherd's View and attached barn, Penrith (1311919)", National Heritage List for England
- Historic England, "Strickland Hotel, Penrith (1137867)", National Heritage List for England
- Historic England, "Thackagate, Penrith (1326936)", National Heritage List for England
- Historic England, "The Grey Goat Inn, Penrith (1137834)", National Heritage List for England
- Historic England, "The Dog and Duck Inn, Penrith (1137836)", National Heritage List for England
- Historic England, "Tudor Restaurant, Penrith (1326909)", National Heritage List for England
- Historic England, "Welcome Inn with attached stable and barn, Penrith (1145068)", National Heritage List for England
- Historic England, "The Woolpack Inn, Penrith (1145113)", National Heritage List for England
- Historic England, "No. 4 Angel Lane, Penrith (1326903)", National Heritage List for England
- Historic England, "Nos. 30, 31 and 32 Albert Street, Penrith (1145139)", National Heritage List for England
- Historic England, "No. 11 Devonshire Street, Penrith (1145125)", National Heritage List for England
- Historic England, "No. 12 Devonshire Street, Penrith (1137904)", National Heritage List for England
- Historic England, "Nos. 14 to 17 Meeting House Lane, Penrith (1145080)", National Heritage List for England
- Historic England, "No. 17 Queen Street, Penrith (1326935)", National Heritage List for England
- Historic England, "Lonsdale House, Penrith (1138076)", National Heritage List for England
- Historic England, "British Legion and Musgrave Hall, Penrith (1145083)", National Heritage List for England
- Historic England, "Salutation Hotel, Penrith (1145063)", National Heritage List for England
- Historic England, "Shepherd's Hill, Penrith (1311922)", National Heritage List for England
- Historic England, "Waverley Hotel, Penrith (1145073)", National Heritage List for England
- Historic England, "Corney House, Penrith (1312134)", National Heritage List for England
- Historic England, "Gate piers to Corney House, Penrith (1326893)", National Heritage List for England
- Historic England, "Lingstubs, Penrith (1145103)", National Heritage List for England
- Historic England, "No. 8 Middlegate, Penrith (1145082)", National Heritage List for England
- Historic England, "Nos. 1 and 2 Crown Square, Penrith (1145123)", National Heritage List for England
- Historic England, "Barco Lodge, Penrith (1145095)", National Heritage List for England
- Historic England, "Eamont Lodge and No. 2 Skirsgill Lane, Penrith (1326940)", National Heritage List for England
- Historic England, "Bowscar Mansion, Penrith (1145111)", National Heritage List for England
- Historic England, "Barn and farm buildings to rear of Lingstubs, Penrith (1145065)", National Heritage List for England
- Historic England, "Premises occupied by Thornborrow, estate agent, Penrith (1145055)", National Heritage List for England
- Historic England, "Tynefield House, Penrith (1311930)", National Heritage List for England
- Historic England, "Methodist Church, Penrith (1145091)", National Heritage List for England
- Historic England, "Caroline Cottage, Penrith (1145106)", National Heritage List for England
- Historic England, "Abbots Bank, Penrith (1145097)", National Heritage List for England
- Historic England, "No. 60 Arthur Street, Penrith (1137784)", National Heritage List for England
- Historic England, "Nos. 65 to 68 Arthur Street, Penrith (1145143)", National Heritage List for England
- Historic England, "No. 18 Brunswick Square, Penrith (1145112)", National Heritage List for England
- Historic England, "No. 8 Great Dockray, Penrith (1326923)", National Heritage List for England
- Historic England, "Nos. 12 (Hunter House) and 13 Hunter's Lane, Penrith (1326907)", National Heritage List for England
- Historic England, "Nos. 30, 30A and 31 King Street, Penrith (1312022)", National Heritage List for England
- Historic England, "Nos. 6 and 7 Middlegate, Penrith (1312014)", National Heritage List for England
- Historic England, "Nos. 19 to 22 Queen Street, Penrith (1145044)", National Heritage List for England
- Historic England, "Nos. 11 and 12 West Lane, Penrith (1326906)", National Heritage List for England
- Historic England, "Altham's Iron Works, Penrith (1145134)", National Heritage List for England
- Historic England, "Carleton Hill, Penrith (1145118)", National Heritage List for England
- Historic England, "Cold Springs, Penrith (1311946)", National Heritage List for England
- Historic England, "Conservative Club, Penrith (1326896)", National Heritage List for England
- Historic England, "Red Coach Restaurant, Penrith (1311954)", National Heritage List for England
- Historic England, "Fellside. The Flat, Penrith (1145084)", National Heritage List for England
- Historic England, "The Grapes Public House, Penrith (1145074)", National Heritage List for England
- Historic England, "Lark Hall, Penrith (1138212)", National Heritage List for England
- Historic England, "Lowther Arms and No. 4 Queen Street, Penrith (1326917)", National Heritage List for England
- Historic England, "Potters Lodge, Penrith (1145093)", National Heritage List for England
- Historic England, "Prince Albert House, Penrith (1145135)", National Heritage List for England
- Historic England, "Rutherford House, Penrith (1145046)", National Heritage List for England
- Historic England, "St Andrew's Bookshop, Penrith (1138193)", National Heritage List for England
- Historic England, "Stoney Beck Inn and integral farm buildings, Penrith (1145066)", National Heritage List for England
- Historic England, "Toll Bar Cottage, Penrith (1326908)", National Heritage List for England
- Historic England, "The Vicarage, Penrith (1145092)", National Heritage List for England
- Historic England, "Victoria Cottage, Penrith (1145119)", National Heritage List for England
- Historic England, "The White Horse Public House, Penrith (1145099)", National Heritage List for England
- Historic England, "Crozier Lodge, Penrith (1145094)", National Heritage List for England
- Historic England, "Nos. 7 to 10 Devonshire Street, Penrith (1326897)", National Heritage List for England
- Historic England, "Inglewood Inn Farmhouse and integral farm buildings, Penrith (1145067)", National Heritage List for England
- Historic England, "Hill House and Coach-house, Penrith (1137936)", National Heritage List for England
- Historic England, "Roundthorn Hotel, Penrith (1145059)", National Heritage List for England
- Historic England, "Infant School, Penrith (1312008)", National Heritage List for England
- Historic England, "Maiden Hill, Penrith (1312037)", National Heritage List for England
- Historic England, "Monument to railway contractors in St Andrew's churchyard on north side of church, Penrith (1145049)", National Heritage List for England
- Historic England, "Penrith Station, Penrith (1326905)", National Heritage List for England
- Historic England, "Christchurch, Penrith (1145060)", National Heritage List for England
- Historic England, "Nos. 26 to 29 Albert Street, Penrith (1145138)", National Heritage List for England
- Historic England, "Nos. 19 and 20 Arthur Street, Penrith (1145140)", National Heritage List for England
- Historic England, "No. 21 Arthur Street, Penrith (1312140)", National Heritage List for England
- Historic England, "Nos. 30 and 31 Arthur Street, Penrith (1145141)", National Heritage List for England
- Historic England, "Nos. 48, 49 and 50 Arthur Street, Penrith (1137783)", National Heritage List for England
- Historic England, "Nos. 53, 54 and 55 Arthur Street, Penrith (1145142)", National Heritage List for England
- Historic England, "Nos. 61, 62, 63 and 63B Arthur Street, Penrith (1326866)", National Heritage List for England
- Historic England, "Nos. 41 and 42 King Street, Penrith (1326910)", National Heritage List for England
- Historic England, "No. 46 King Street, Penrith (1145075)", National Heritage List for England
- Historic England, "Nos. 4, 5 and 6 Little Dockray and The General Wolfe Inn, Penrith (1145077)", National Heritage List for England
- Historic England, "No. 7 Queen Street with attached coach-house and stable, Penrith (1311959)", National Heritage List for England
- Historic England, "Nos. 2 to 4 St Andrew's Churchyard, Penrith (1145051)", National Heritage List for England
- Historic England, "Nos. 11 and 12 St Andrew's Churchyard, Penrith (1145053)", National Heritage List for England
- Historic England, "Nos. 1 to 8 Wordsworth Terrace, Churchyard, Penrith (1177623)", National Heritage List for England
- Historic England, "Ash Grove, Penrith (1326902)", National Heritage List for England
- Historic England, "The Elbow Room Public House, Penrith (1145122)", National Heritage List for England
- Historic England, "Candia, Penrith (1137845)", National Heritage List for England
- Historic England, "Former Frenchfield Farmhouse, Penrith (1145116)", National Heritage List for England
- Historic England, "Outbuildings and cattle shed at the rear of Frenchfield Farm, Penrith (1137840)", National Heritage List for England
- Historic England, "Kitchenhill Bridge, Penrith (1145076)", National Heritage List for England
- Historic England, "North Bank, Penrith (1145058)", National Heritage List for England
- Historic England, "Premises occupied by Harrison Granger and Fairer, Solicitors, Penrith (1326937)", National Heritage List for England
- Historic England, "Premises occupied by Jackson, butcher (corner of de Whelpdale's Lane), Penrith (1326938)", National Heritage List for England
- Historic England, "Virginia, Penrith (1326904)", National Heritage List for England
- Historic England, "Alma Cottage Alma House, Penrith (1326887)", National Heritage List for England
- Historic England, "Outwood and integral stable and coach-house, Penrith (1312143)", National Heritage List for England
- Historic England, "Former Grammar School, Penrith (1145050)", National Heritage List for England
- Historic England, "Clock Tower, Penrith (1326913)", National Heritage List for England
- Historic England, "Nos. 12 and 13 Albert Street, Penrith (1145137)", National Heritage List for England
- Historic England, "United Reformed Church, Penrith (1145089)", National Heritage List for England
- Historic England, "Gateway to cemetery with pair of integral chapels, Penrith (1145105)", National Heritage List for England
- Historic England, "Cemetery lodge, Penrith (1326888)", National Heritage List for England
- Historic England, "Methodist Church, Penrith (1145088)", National Heritage List for England
- Historic England, "Nos. 5 and 6 Devonshire Street, Penrith (1137885)", National Heritage List for England
- Historic England, "No. 3 Little Dockray, Penrith (1138048)", National Heritage List for England
- Historic England, "Fern Bank, Penrith (1145104)", National Heritage List for England
- Historic England, "Penrith Town Hall (1420806)", National Heritage List for England
- Historic England, "Penrith Boer War Memorial (1446766)", National Heritage List for England
- Historic England, "Barclay's Bank, Penrith (1138070)", National Heritage List for England
- Historic England, "War Memorial outside St Andrew's Church, Penrith (1434044)", National Heritage List for England
- Historic England, "War Memorial Gate, Penrith (1483362)", National Heritage List for England
- Historic England, "K6 Telephone Kiosk (outside Penrith Station), Penrith (1145021)", National Heritage List for England
- Historic England, "Screen walls of forecourt to Mansion House, Penrith (1137823)", National Heritage List for England
- Historic England, "Gate piers to Shepherd's Hill, Penrith (1326942)", National Heritage List for England
- Historic England, Listed Buildings
- Hyde, Matthew; Pevsner, Nikolaus (2010) [1967], Cumbria, The Buildings of England, New Haven and London: Yale University Press, ISBN 978-0-300-12663-1
