= Penrith Castle =

Ruined castle in Penrith, Cumbria, England

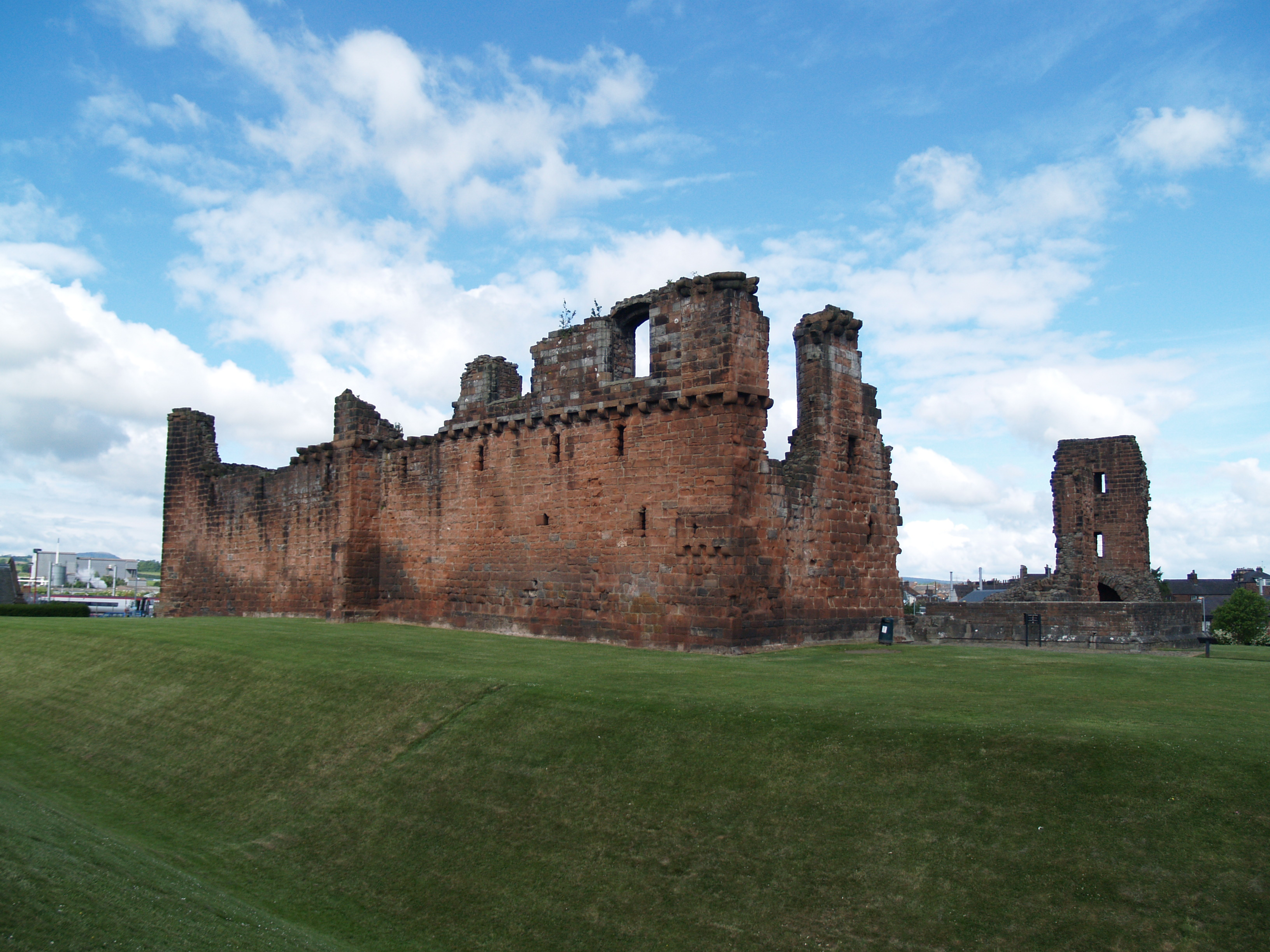
- Exterior of Penrith Castle and remains of moat, 2008

Site information
- Owner: English Heritage
- Controlled by: Westmorland and Furness Council
- Open to the public: Yes
- Condition: Ruined
- Website: English Heritage webpage

Location
- Location in Eden, Cumbria Location in Cumbria, England
- Coordinates: 54.6621°N 2.7573°W

Site history
- Built: 1399–1437
- Materials: New Red Sandstone

Penrith Castle is a now-ruined medieval castle located in Penrith, in the north-west of England, a few miles to the east of the Lake District National Park.

== Early history ==
The site of the castle, in the west of the town is likely to have been a Roman encampment, as it has an irregular and quadrilateral layout.

== Fifteenth century origins ==
Penrith Castle was built between 1399 and 1470 as a defence against Scottish raids; it has been said that, unlike so many of its counterparts in the north, 'the building exhibits no indication of very ancient date.' The lordship of Penrith was created in 1397 as a grant to the newly created earl of Westmorland, and the castle was mentioned in a grant of 1437. Previously believed to have been first built by William Strickland who later become Bishop of Carlisle, the lateness of this reference, it has been suggested, indicates that the most likely builder was Richard Neville, Earl of Salisbury. However, it is not known whether this was 'new work on a fresh site, or whether he simply utilized Strickland's works as the core of his building.' It is now considered more likely that Strickland built Hutton Hall, near the church in Penrith, instead, and furthermore that a 'tenurial reconstruction shows that he [Strickland] did not hold the castle site.' There is a possible reference to a construction in the site of the castle as early as 1412, and Westmorland is known to have granted the building of a tower there, from his comital seat at Raby Castle, the next year. Either way, it seems most unlikely that 'it was built not by a baron, but by the inhabitants themselves, for their own defence,' as was once stated.

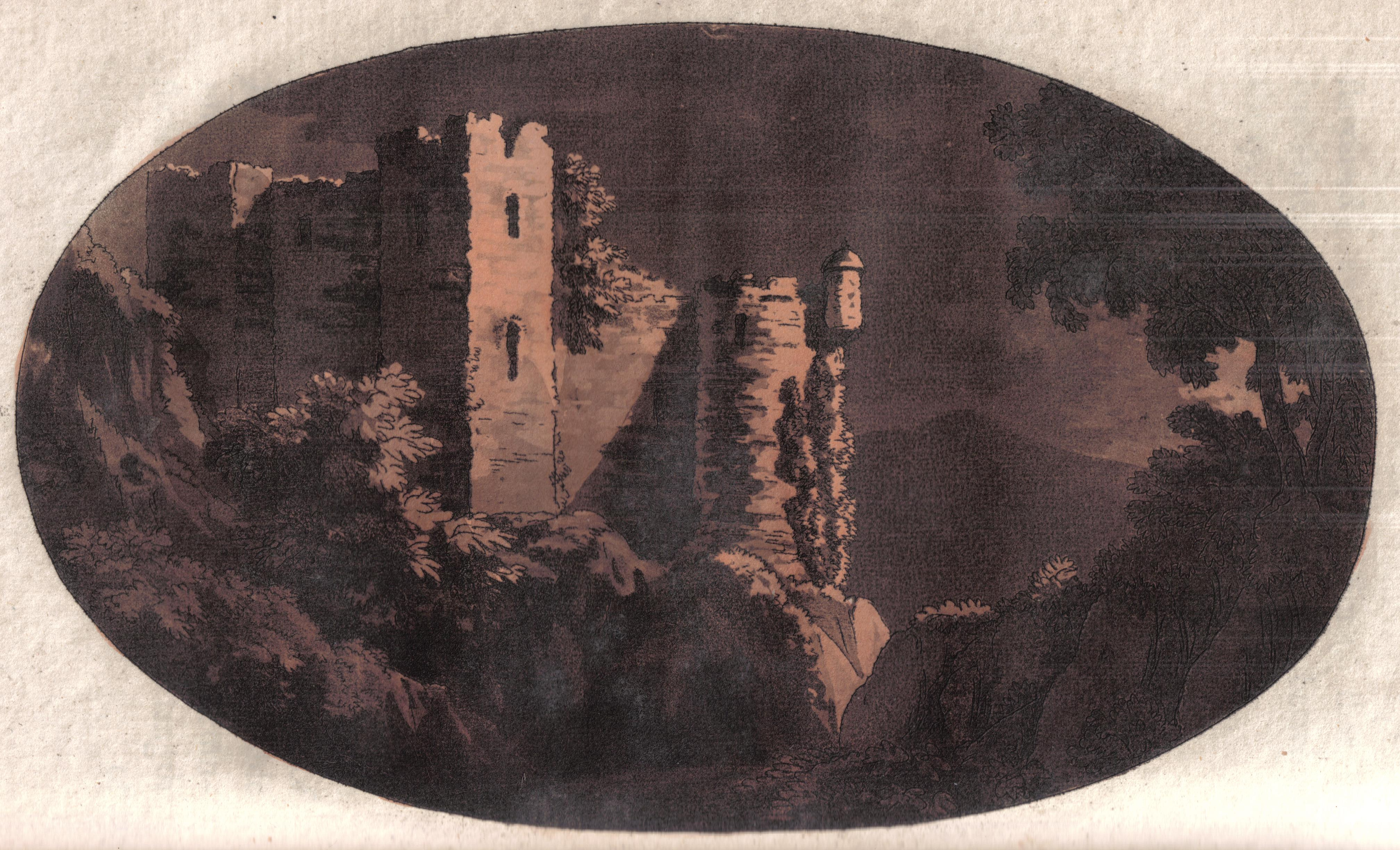
Penrith castle in 1772.

The liberty and castle of Penrith became the most important offices held by the Neville family in the fifteenth century, and their most important source of patronage locally. By 1441 and until 1444, Salisbury, who was then Warden of the West March, was sub-letting the lordship of Penrith to Lumley, bishop of Carlisle, and Professor A. J. Pollard has estimated that 'the Nevilles' Penrith estates were worth approximately £350.'

Following Salisbury's death in 1460, Richard, Earl of Warwick, the 'Kingmaker,' inherited the Castle and Lordship, but was himself slain at the Battle of Barnet without leaving a male heir, so they reverted to the crown. They were granted in 1471 to Richard, Duke of Gloucester by King Edward IV, who used Penrith as a base whilst 'taking effectual measures' against the Scots, and also 'enjoyed the revenues of the estates' of the Forest of Cumberland. It was at the same time that the duke was appointed sheriff of Cumberland five consecutive years, being described as 'of Penrith Castle' in 1478.

== Later period ==
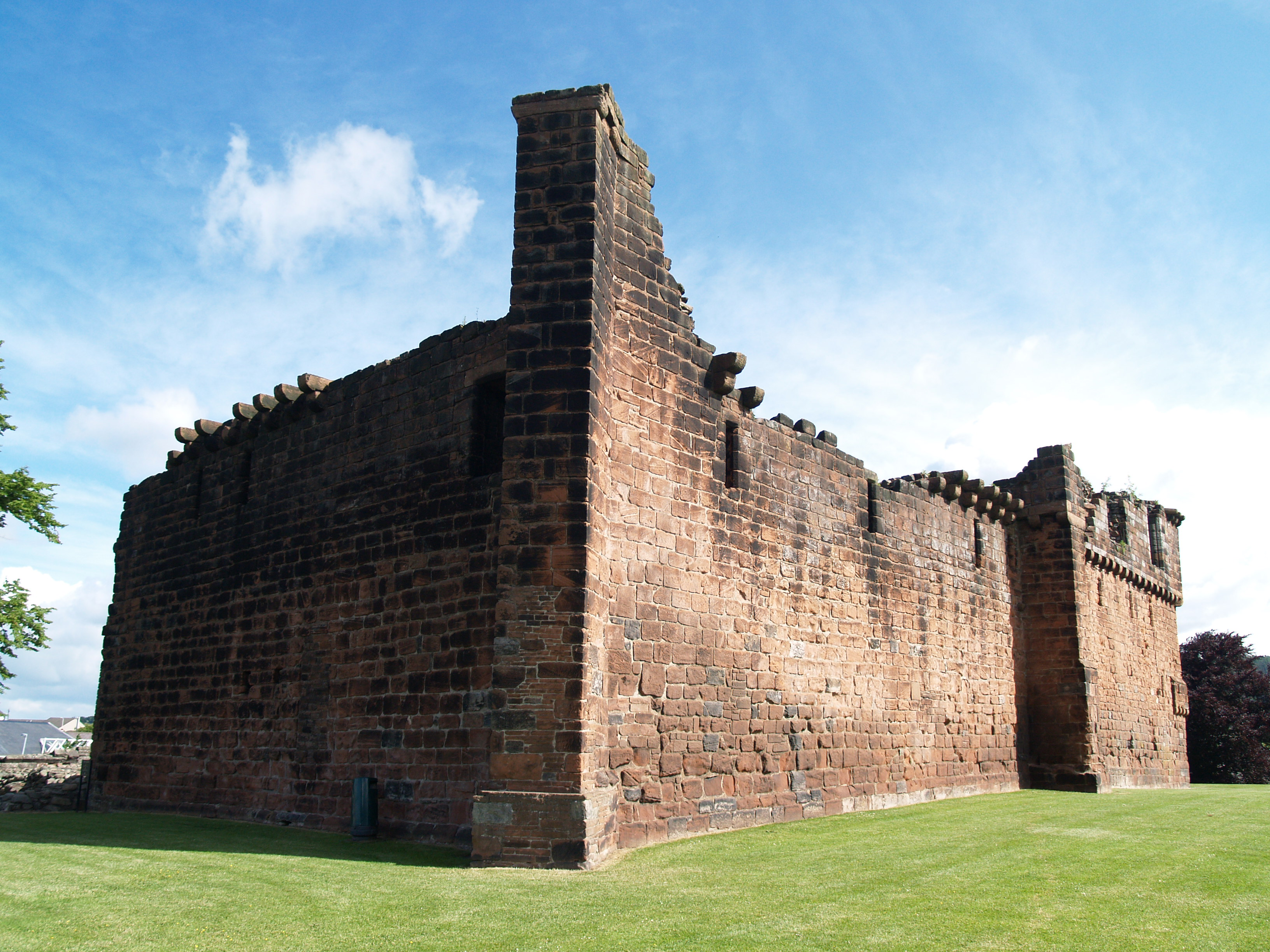
Exterior of present-day ruins of Penrith Castle, 2008

Following Gloucester's usurpation of his nephew's throne and then his death (1483–85), the castle and the town remained part of the Crown Estate until the reign of William III, who gave it and most other Crown property in Cumberland to his friend Hans Willem Bentinck, 1st Earl of Portland in 1696. The castle was sold by the Earls and Dukes of Portland to the Dukes of Devonshire in 1787. They later sold it to the Lancaster & Carlisle Railway Company who built Penrith railway station; its remains are opposite the railway station today. It later passed into the ownership of the Penrith Urban District Council, who in the 1920s converted the grounds into a public park and built housing nearby. The few ruins that remain today were described in the nineteenth century as not "very interesting in respect of their antiquity, or their present appearance." Also, very much as they stand today:

The ruins are remarkable more for their extent than their magnificence: the chief objects of interest are the projecting corbels in the eastern front, which appear to have supported an open corridor; there are some large vaults, which were probably prisons. The walls, broken in many places, and intersected with remaining windows, assume, from different points of view, striking varieties of perspective scenery. After the great civil war, the edifice was dismantled, and part of the materials sold.

The castle is maintained by English Heritage, and is recorded in the National Heritage List for England as a designated Grade I listed building.

== See also ==
- Grade I listed buildings in Cumbria
- Listed buildings in Penrith, Cumbria
