= St Andrew's Church, Penrith =

Coordinates: 54.6642°N 2.7512°W

St Andrew's Church
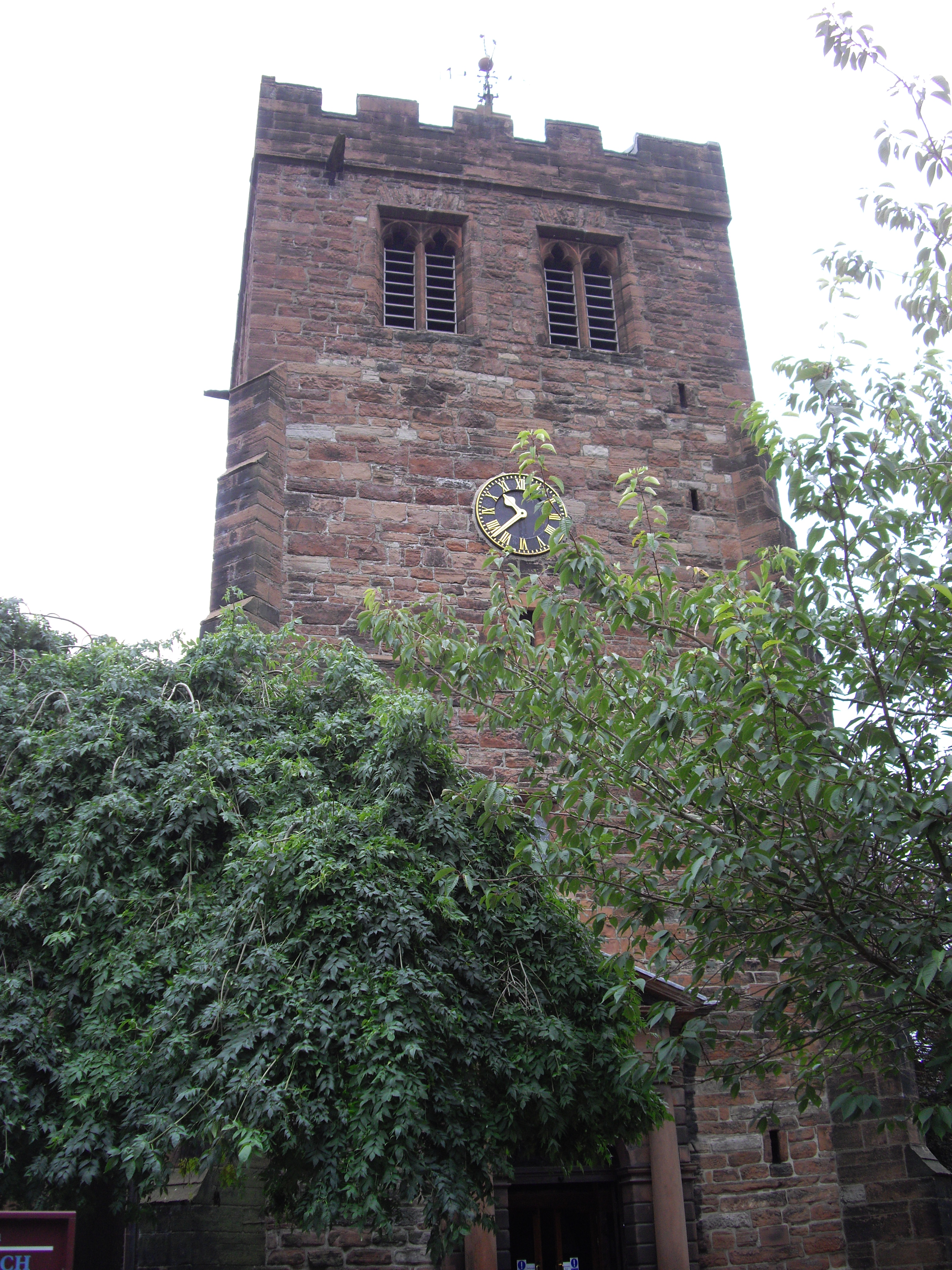
- Tower of St Andrew's Church

- Location in Eden, Cumbria Location in Cumbria, England
- OS grid reference: NY 517 302
- Location: Penrith, Cumbria
- Country: England
- Denomination: Anglican

History
- Status: Parish church
- Dedication: Saint Andrew

Architecture
- Functional status: Active
- Heritage designation: Grade I
- Designated: 24 April 1951
- Architect(s): William Etty (?) (body of church)
- Architectural type: Church
- Style: Gothic, Georgian

Specifications
- Materials: Sandstone

Administration
- Province: York
- Diocese: Carlisle
- Archdeaconry: Carlisle
- Deanery: Penrith
- Parish: Penrith Saint Andrew

Clergy
- Rector: Revd David Sargent

St Andrew's Church is in the centre of the town of Penrith, Cumbria, England. It is an active Anglican parish church in the deanery of Penrith, the archdeaconry of Carlisle, and the diocese of Carlisle. The parishes of Penrith (St Andrew's and Christ Church); St John, Newton Reigny and St John the Evangelist, Plumpton Wall are united in a single benefice . The church is recorded in the National Heritage List for England as a designated Grade I listed building. At one time St Andrew's had a chapel of ease or mission church in Brougham Street in the Penrith suburb of Castletown called St Saviours and another, All Hallows at the hamlet of Bowscar just to the north of the town.

== History ==
The tower dates from the 12th and 13th centuries, the top stage being either added or rebuilt in the 15th century. The rest of the church, together with the west doorway, was rebuilt in 1721–72, when the diagonal buttresses were added to the tower. The 18th-century rebuilding was almost certainly designed by William Etty of York. The nave of the old medieval church was totally demolished and re-built, in 1721–22, partly because it was deemed to be beyond repair, partly to prevent the increasingly prevalent private take-over of space by local landowning families, and partly to improve the accommodation, and better to fit the changed liturgical practice and artistic views of the period. The vicar, Hugh Todd drove the project forward.

== Architecture ==
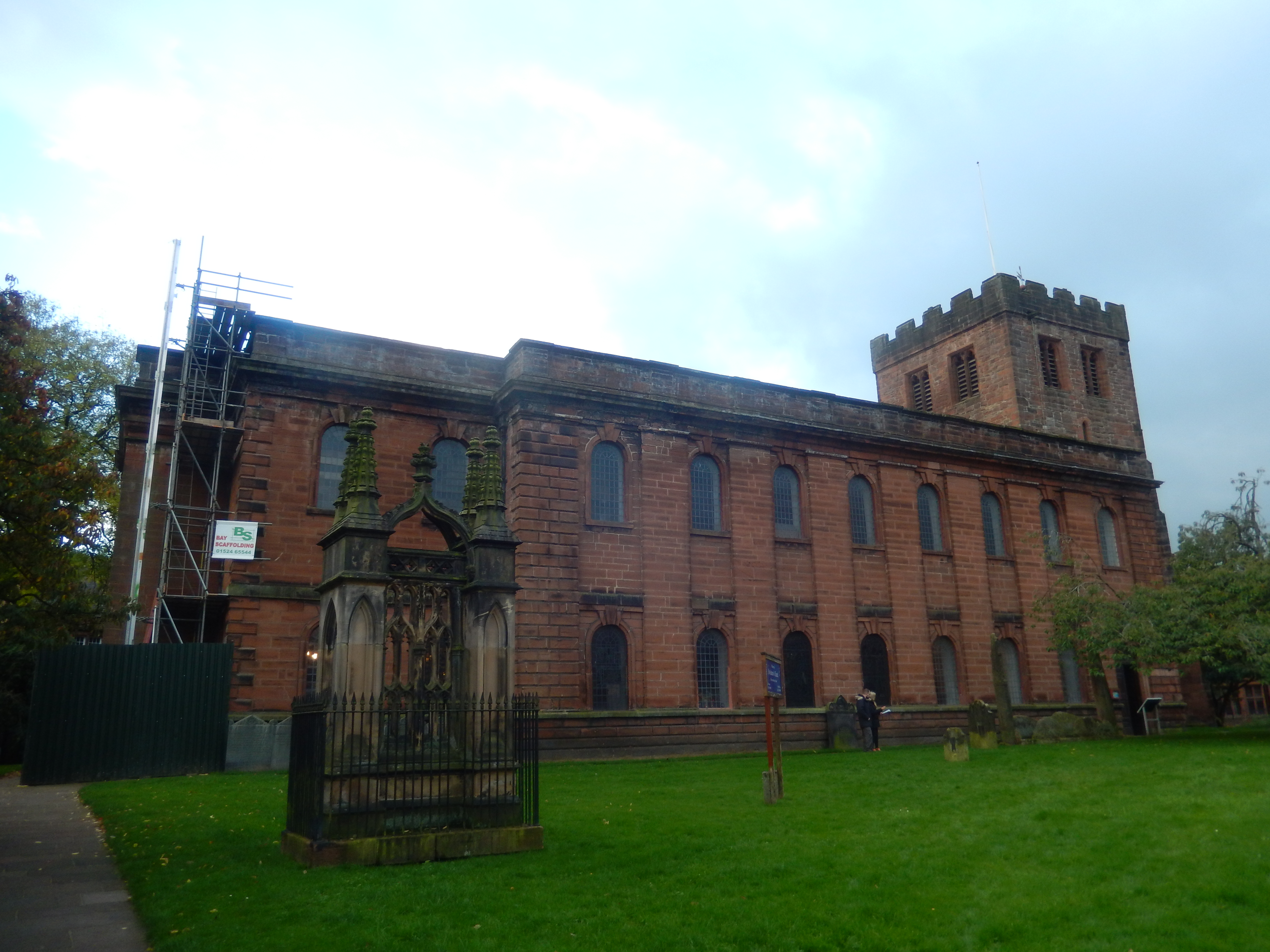
St Andrew's Church, Penrith, 12th-13th-century tower with 15th-century top stage, nave built 1721-22

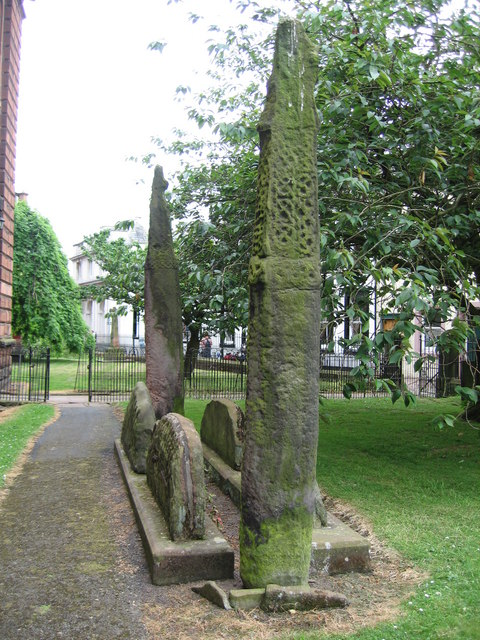
Giant's Grave

=== Exterior ===
The tower is constructed in red sandstone rubble. Its lower part originally served a defensive purpose, being built with thick walls, no buttresses, very small windows, and no entrance. The bell openings are straight-headed with two lights. The west doorway has a Neoclassical surround, including a triangular pediment, a triglyph frieze, and Doric columns. The body of the church is built in red sandstone ashlar. It is in Georgian style, with an eight-bay nave, and a two-bay chancel terminating in a shallow square apse. Along the sides of the church are two tiers of round-arched windows separated by broad pilasters, and at the east end are three windows beneath a large arch. On the south wall of the church is a sundial.

=== Interior ===
Inside the church are galleries on the north, west, and south sides. These are carried on Tuscan columns, which rise to the ceiling as wooden quasi-Tuscan columns. At the east end of the church are paintings by Jacob Thompson of Penrith dated 1845 depicting the Angel and the Shepherds, and the Agony in the Garden. The communion table dates from 1722, and was lengthened in 1951. The brass chandeliers were given to the church in 1746 by the 2nd Duke of Portland in recognition of the part the town played in the defence against the Young Pretender in 1745. The pulpit consists of the top section of a former three—decker. At the back of the gallery are royal arms dated 1723 by Mathias Read. The font consists of a simple octagonal bowl, and is dated 1661 which is the date it was brought back into use after the Restoration of King Charles II. The stained glass in the east window of 1870 is by Hardman, and that in the north aisle, dating from 1889, is by Burlison and Grylls. Elsewhere are windows by Clayton and Bell, Powell's, G.J.Baguley, and by Cox, Sons and Buckley. The monuments include two coffin lids inscribed with foliated crosses, one dating from the 14th century, the other possibly from the 12th century. There are also two worn stone effigies from the 17th century.

The original pipe organ was installed in the west gallery in 1796 by Samuel Green (London). In 1868 a two manual organ was built by Forster and Andrews (Hull) in the present position in the south gallery. This was increased to three manuals in 1923 but reduced to two in the 1972 rebuilding by Jardines (Manchester). Further rebuilds have been undertaken by Rushworth and Dreaper. and by Andrew Carter (Wakefield) in 2015.

There is a ring of eight bells. Six of these were cast in 1763 by Lester and Pack at the Whitechapel Bell Foundry, and the other two by John Taylor and Company of Loughborough.

The church contains a stained glass image of Joan Neville (née Beaufort) born about 1375, daughter of John of Gaunt (1340–1399) and Katherine Swynford (c1350-1403). Joan married her second husband, Ralph Neville (-1425), in 1396. She died in 1440 and her tomb lies next to her mother in Lincoln Cathedral. Joan was the niece of Geoffrey Chaucer (-1400), author of The Canterbury Tales, husband of her mother's sister, Philippa, (née de Roet), and her son was Sir William Neville (1405–1463), Baron Fauconberg, Commander of the Yorkist army at the Battle of Towton in 1461.

== Clock and chimes ==
In 1712 Aaron Cheasbrough was paid £16 (equivalent to £2,856 in 2025) for making a new clock, and Lancelot Holme a carpenter received £2 for making a case for it. In 1765 new chimes were supplied by William Porthouse at a cost of £53 2s 11d. (equivalent to £8,112 in 2025).

A new clock and chimes was built by Potts of Leeds and installed in the tower in 1889. The clock was fitted with a double three-legged gravity escapement on the principle of Lord Grimethorpe. The main wheel of the going train was 14 inches (36 cm) in diameter. A zinc and iron compensated pendulum had a period of 1¼ seconds. The hours were struck on the tenor bell and the chimes were fitted with a mechanism allowing them to be pulled off during periods of change ringing. The exterior dials were of solid cast-iron with sunk centre and figures and minutes raised, the background being painted dark blue. The hands were made of copper, balanced within, with a gilt finish.

== External features ==
In the churchyard are two monuments, each of which has been scheduled. One is known as the Giant's Grave, and dates from the 10th century. It consists of two Anglo-Saxon cross shafts and four hogbacks, which have been in their present arrangement since at least 1664–65. The other, known as the Giant's Thumb, also dates from the 10th century. It consists of a single sandstone Anglo-Saxon cross shaft set on a modern sandstone base, which was erected here in 1887. It has a wheel head, and carving on its sides. Also in the churchyard is a monument dated 1846 in memory of Robert Vertue, an engineer employed on the construction of the Lancaster and Carlisle Railway, in Gothic Revival style, listed at Grade II, and a war memorial dated 1919 in the form of a Celtic cross.

== See also ==
- Grade I listed churches in Cumbria
- Grade I listed buildings in Cumbria
- Listed buildings in Penrith, Cumbria

== Sources ==
- Mullett, Michael A. (2019). A New history of Penrith: book IV: Penrith in the eighteenth century, 1715-1800. Carlisle: Bookcase. pp. 1–297. ISBN 9781912181209.
