= John Clifford, 7th Baron Clifford =

English peer (c. 1389–1422)

John Clifford
- Baron de Clifford
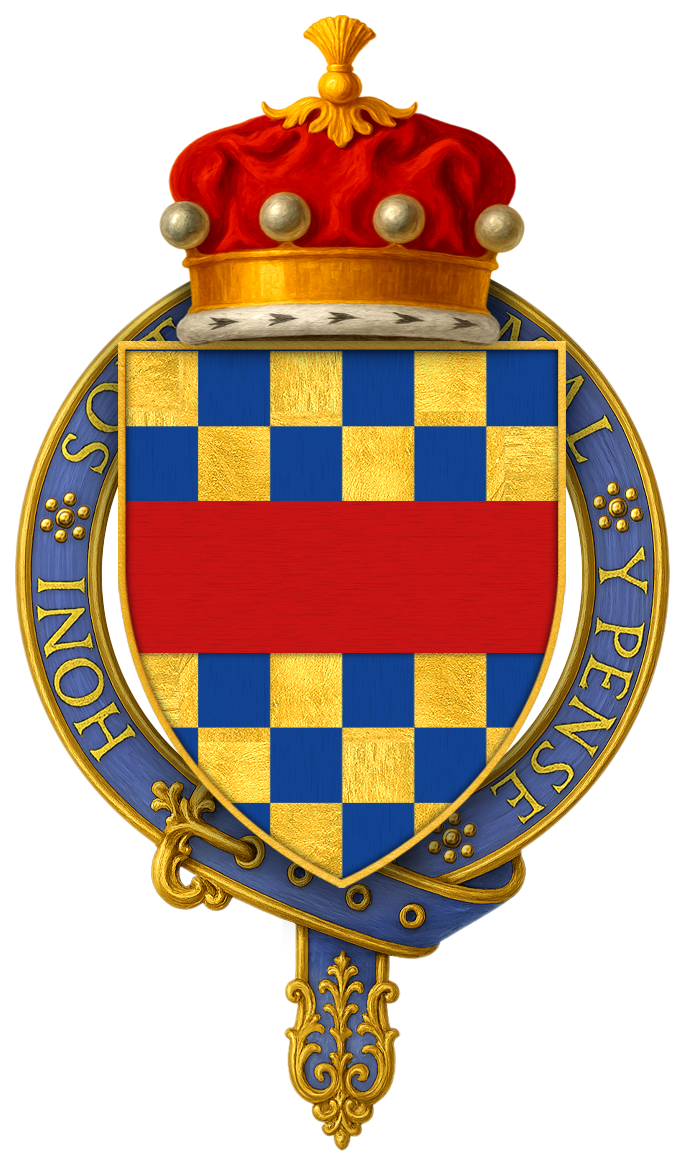
- John Clifford, 7th Baron de Clifford
- Tenure: 18 August 1391 – 13 March 1422
- Predecessor: Thomas Clifford, 6th Baron Clifford
- Successor: Thomas Clifford, 8th Baron de Clifford
- Other titles: 7th Lord of Skipton
- Born: c. 1389; Appleby Castle, Westmorland, England.
- Died: 13 March 1422 (Killed at the Siege of Meaux); Meaux, Seine-et-Marne, France.
- Residence: Appleby Castle; Brougham Castle; Skipton Castle
- Spouse: Elizabeth Percy
- Issue: Thomas Clifford, 8th Baron de Clifford; Henry Clifford; Mary Clifford, Lady Wentworth; Blanche Clifford, Lady Waterton
- Parents: Thomas Clifford, 6th Baron Clifford; Elizabeth de Roos

John Clifford, 7th Baron de Clifford (c. 1389 – 13 March 1422), also known as John, Lord Clifford, 7th Lord of the Honor of Skipton, was an English peer. He was killed at the siege of Meaux, France.

== Family ==
John Clifford, born about 1389, was the only son of Thomas Clifford, 6th Baron Clifford (d. 18 August 1391), and Elizabeth de Roos (d. March 1424), daughter of Thomas de Roos, 4th Baron Roos of Helmsley and Lady Beatrix Stafford, daughter of Ralph de Stafford, 1st Earl of Stafford. He had a sister, Maud Clifford, who married firstly, John Neville, 6th Baron Latimer, and secondly, Richard of Conisburgh, 3rd Earl of Cambridge.

== Career ==
At his father's death on 18 August 1391, Clifford, then aged about three, inherited the title and the position of hereditary High Sheriff of Westmorland. He was summoned to Parliament from 21 September 1411 to 26 February 1421.

He took part in a great tournament at Carlisle between six English and six Scottish knights, and in the war in France. He was at the Siege of Harfleur and at the Battle of Agincourt, where he was intended to serve Henry V with 3 archers. He accepted the surrender of Cherbourg. He was made a Knight of the Garter on 3 May 1421. He was a legatee in the will of his cousin, Henry V.

He was killed at the Siege of Meaux on 13 March 1422, and is said to have been buried at Bolton Priory. His widow, who died 26 October 1436, is buried at Staindrop, Durham.

== Marriage and issue ==
John Clifford married Elizabeth Percy, the daughter of Sir Henry "Hotspur" Percy and Lady Elizabeth Mortimer, their children are as follows:

- Thomas Clifford, 8th Baron de Clifford, who married Joan Dacre, daughter of Thomas Dacre, 6th Baron Dacre and Lady Phillipa de Neville, daughter of Ralph Neville, 1st Earl of Westmorland.
- Henry Clifford
- Lady Mary Clifford, who married Sir Philip Wentworth of Nettlestead, Suffolk (c. 1421 – 18 May 1464), beheaded at Middleham, Yorkshire, after the Battle of Hexham, by whom she had a son and two daughters. Lady Mary Clifford's granddaughter, Margery Wentworth, married Sir John Seymour of Wolf Hall.
- Lady Blanche (or Beatrix) Clifford, who married Sir Robert Waterton (d. 10 December 1475), son of the Lancastrian retainer, Robert Waterton (d. 17 January 1425). There were no issue of the marriage.

== Lady Elizabeth Percy ==
Clifford's wife, Elizabeth, was the daughter of Sir Henry Percy (nicknamed Hotspur) and Lady Elizabeth Mortimer, daughter of Edmund Mortimer, 3rd Earl of March and Philippa Plantagenet, 5th Countess of Ulster.
Philippa was the daughter of Lady Elizabeth de Burgh and Lionel of Antwerp, son of King Edward III.

After John Clifford's death, a widowed Elizabeth remarried. Marrying Ralph Neville, 2nd Earl of Westmorland in 1426.
Ralph and Elizabeth had a son, Sir John Neville, who married Lady Anne Holland, daughter of John Holland, 2nd Duke of Exeter.

== Notes ==
Peerage of England
Preceded by Thomas Clifford	Baron de Clifford; 1391–1422	Succeeded by Thomas Clifford
