= Baron Camoys =

Title in the Peerage of England

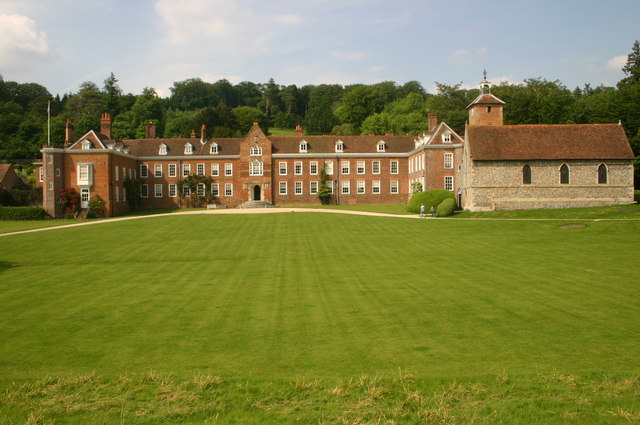
Stonor House, the seat of the Baron Camoys.

The barony of Camoys was created twice.

== First creation (1313) ==
From 26 November 1313 to 1 April 1335, Ralph de Camoys (d. 1336) was summoned to Parliament by writ, and is thereby held to have become Baron Camoys of the first creation.

He married firstly, Margaret de Braose, daughter of William de Braose, 1st Baron Braose (d. 1291), and secondly, Elizabeth le Despenser, daughter of Hugh le Despenser, 1st Earl of Winchester (executed 27 October 1326). By his first wife, Margaret, Ralph had a son, Thomas de Camoys, 2nd Baron Camoys (d. 1372). Thomas married Margaret, and by her had a son, Ralph Camoys.

This first creation of the barony expired with the death on 11 April 1372 without male heirs of Thomas de Camoys, 2nd Baron Camoys, his son Ralph having predeceased him.

== Second creation (1383) ==
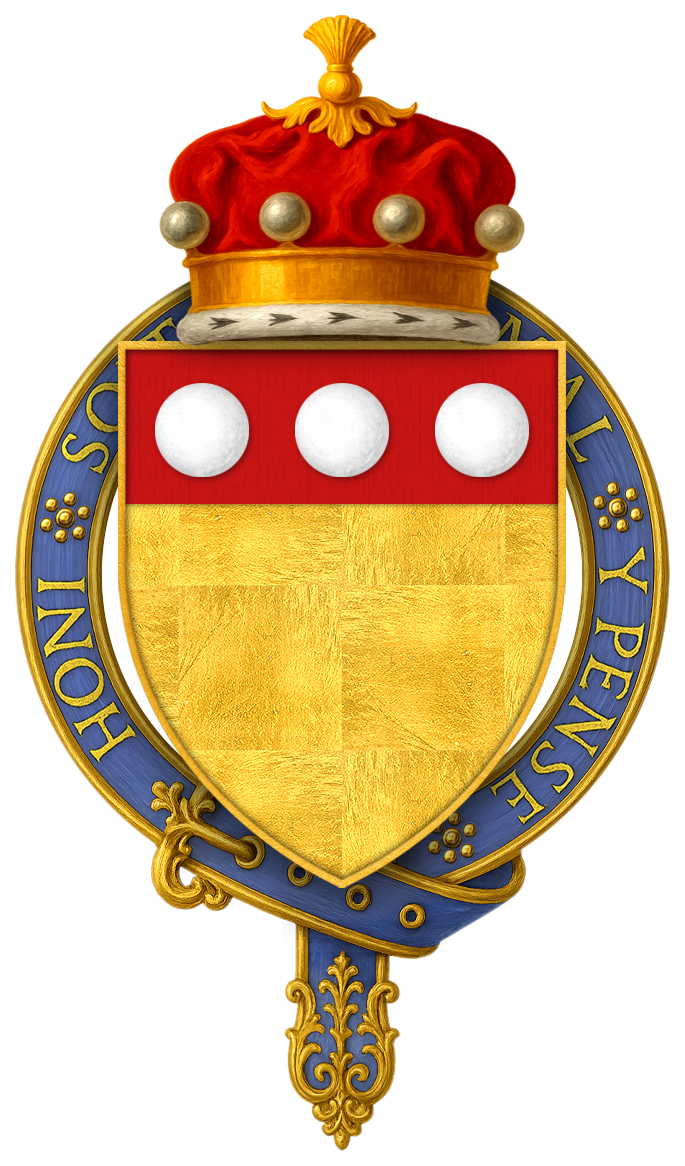
Coat of arms of 1st Baron Camoys as a Knight of the Order of the Garter

The heir of Thomas de Camoys (d. 1372) was his nephew, another Thomas de Camoys (d. 1421), who was the grandson of Ralph de Camoys (d. 1336) by his second wife, Elizabeth le Despenser, and the son of Sir John Camoys by his second wife, Elizabeth le Latimer, daughter of William le Latimer, 3rd Lord Latimer. From 20 August 1383 to 26 February 1421 Thomas de Camoys (d. 1421) was summoned to Parliament by writ, by which he is held to have become Baron Camoys of the second creation.

Thomas de Camoys (d. 1421) was twice married, firstly to Elizabeth Louches, the daughter of William Louches of Great Milton and Chiselhampton, and secondly to Elizabeth Mortimer, daughter of Edmund Mortimer, 3rd Earl of March, and widow of Henry 'Hotspur' Percy. By his first wife, Elizabeth Louches, he had a son, Sir Richard Camoys, who married Joan Poynings, and by her had three sons, John, Ralph and Hugh, and two daughters, Margaret and Eleanor. Sir Richard Camoys predeceased his father, dying sometime before 24 June 1416.

=== Abeyance (1426–1839) ===
The barony was inherited by Sir Richard's third son, Hugh de Camoys, 2nd Baron Camoys, who died a minor and a ward of the King on 18 June 1426. On his death the barony fell into abeyance between his sisters, Margaret and Eleanor.

== Stonor family ==
It remained in abeyance for 413 years until 1839, when Thomas Stonor, 3rd Baron Camoys successfully claimed the barony as a descendant of Margaret de Camoys. He had previously represented Oxford in the House of Commons and later held office as a lord-in-waiting (government whip in the House of Lords) in the Liberal administrations of Lord John Russell, Lord Palmerston and William Ewart Gladstone, as well as in the coalition government of Lord Aberdeen. He was succeeded by his grandson, Francis Stonor, 4th Baron Camoys, who served as a lord-in-waiting in the Liberal governments of William Gladstone and Lord Rosebery. As of 2023 the title is held by his great-great-grandson, the 8th baron, who succeeded his father in that year. The ancestral seat of the Stonor family is Stonor Park, Henley-on-Thames, Oxfordshire.

== Barons Camoys, first creation (1313) ==
- Ralph de Camoys, 1st Baron Camoys (d. 1336)
- Thomas de Camoys, 2nd Baron Camoys (d. 1372)

== Barons Camoys, second creation (1383) ==
- Thomas de Camoys, 1st Baron Camoys (d. 1419/21)
- Hugh de Camoys, 2nd Baron Camoys (1413–1426) (title in abeyance from 1426)
- Thomas Stonor, 3rd Baron Camoys (1797–1881) (abeyance terminated 1839)
- Francis Stonor, 4th Baron Camoys (1856–1897)
- Ralph Stonor, 5th Baron Camoys (1884–1968)
- Sherman Stonor, 6th Baron Camoys (1913–1976)
- Thomas Stonor, 7th Baron Camoys (1940–2023)
- William Stonor, 8th Baron Camoys (b. 1974)

The heir apparent is the 8th baron's son, Hon. Ralph Thomas William Peter Stonor (b. 2007)
