= St George's Church, Trotton =

St. George's Church, Trotton
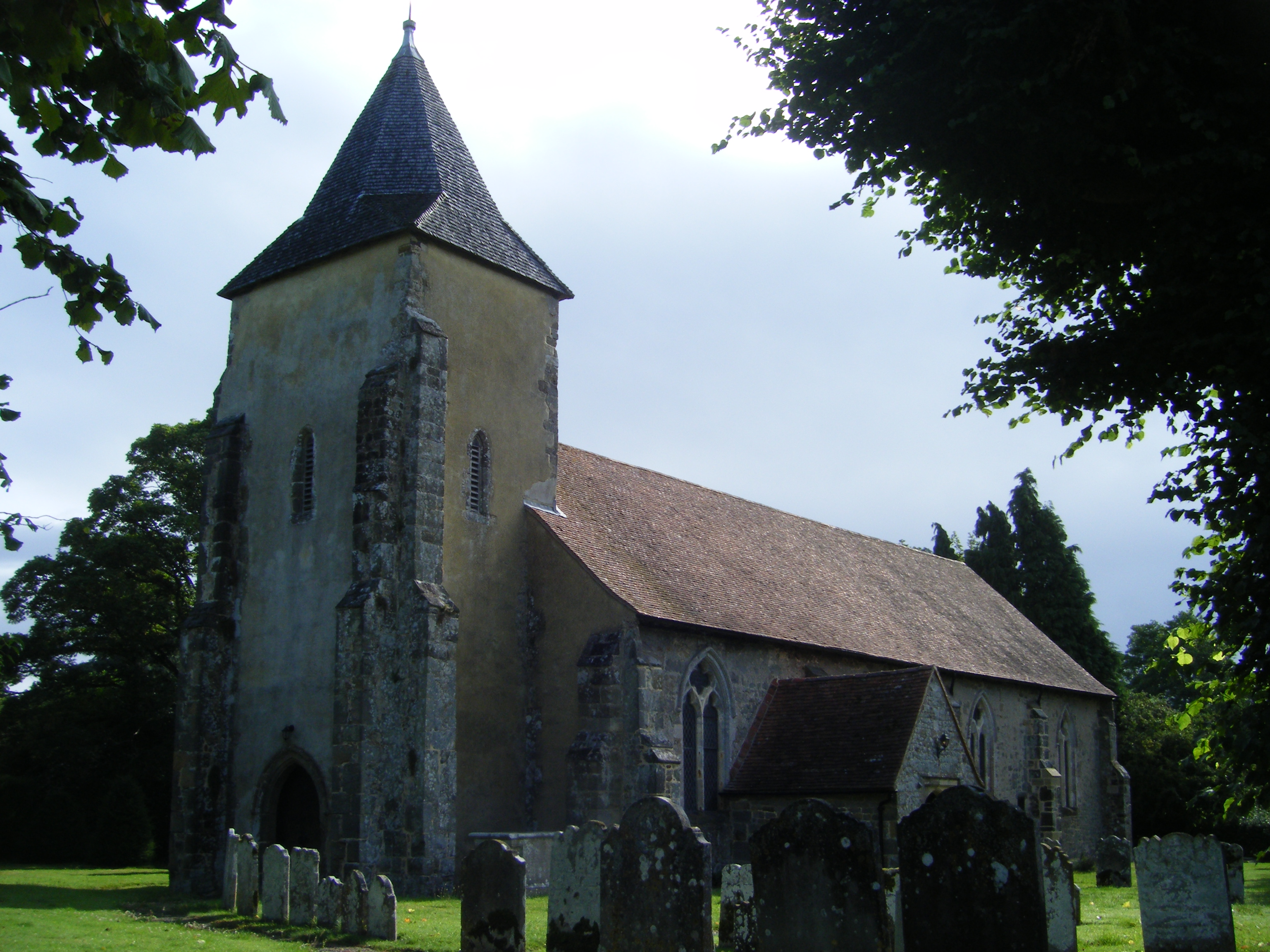
- St. George's Church, Trotton
- 50.995893°N 0.809682°W
- Location: Petersfield Road, Trotton, West Sussex
- Country: England
- Denomination: Anglican
- Website: St George, Trotton

History
- Status: Parish church
- Founded: Disputed (c. 1240 or 14th century)
- Dedication: St George

Architecture
- Functional status: Active
- Heritage designation: Grade I
- Designated: 18 June 1959
- Architectural type: Church
- Style: Decorated

Administration
- Province: Canterbury
- Diocese: Chichester
- Archdeaconry: Horsham
- Deanery: Midhurst
- Parish: Trotton

Clergy
- Rector: Revd Edward Doyle

St. George's Church is an Anglican church in Trotton, a village in the district of Chichester, one of seven local government districts in the English county of West Sussex. Most of the structure was built in the early 14th century. However, some parts date to around 1230, and there is evidence suggesting an earlier church on the same site. The church is recorded in the National Heritage List for England as a designated Grade I listed building for its architectural and historical importance.

The church is dedicated to St. George, patron saint of England. The rector of St George's also oversees the parish of Rogate with Terwick, and most services are held at St. Bartholomew's church in Rogate: just two services a month take place at Trotton. The church is also used once a month by the British Orthodox Church.

== History ==
Historians have disagreed about its age, and the existence of an older church on the same site. The tower has been dated by its architecture to between 1230 and 1240, but other historians question this date and suggest the tower and the body of the church both date to the 14th century. The porch appears to be a 17th century addition. There is a tomb of Margaret de Camois in the nave. It has been suggested that its location there, rather than the chancel as would be expected for the family of the lord of the manor (which her surname suggests she was), may indicate that the church was built on the site of an earlier, smaller, church and the tomb was in the chancel of that church. Local historian Roger Chatterton-Newman disagrees, saying there would be no need for a church on the site any earlier.

A comprehensive restoration was undertaken by Philip Mainwaring Johnston in 1904. The work cost £700 (£74,000 as of 2025), and a time capsule containing details of the builders, church officials and contemporary world events was buried at the end of the job. St George's Church was listed at Grade I on 18 June 1959. Such buildings are defined as being of "exceptional interest" and greater than national importance. As of February 2001, it was one of 80 Grade I listed buildings, and 3,251 listed buildings of all grades, in the district of Chichester.

== Description ==
The church is in the village of Trotton, West Sussex, just off the A272 near the River Rother, between the early 15th-century bridge over the river and the 16th-century manor house. The present ecclesiastical parish of Trotton covers a large north–south area of countryside, includes the village of Trotton and the hamlets of Chithurst and Ingrams Green, and is served by St Mary's Church at Chithurst as well as St George's. Both churches are in the Rural Deanery of Midhurst, one of eight deaneries in the Archdeaconry of Horsham in the Diocese of Chichester.

== Architecture ==
The church has a plain, simple Decorated-style exterior, apart from the tower which is Early English style. The nave and chancel are in a single chamber, separated by a narrow step instead of a chancel arch. The church is built of rubble with ashlar dressings. The roof of the main body is tiled; during the 14th century it had a thatched roof, but this was replaced in about 1400. The tower roof is a shingled octagonal cap.

=== Bells ===
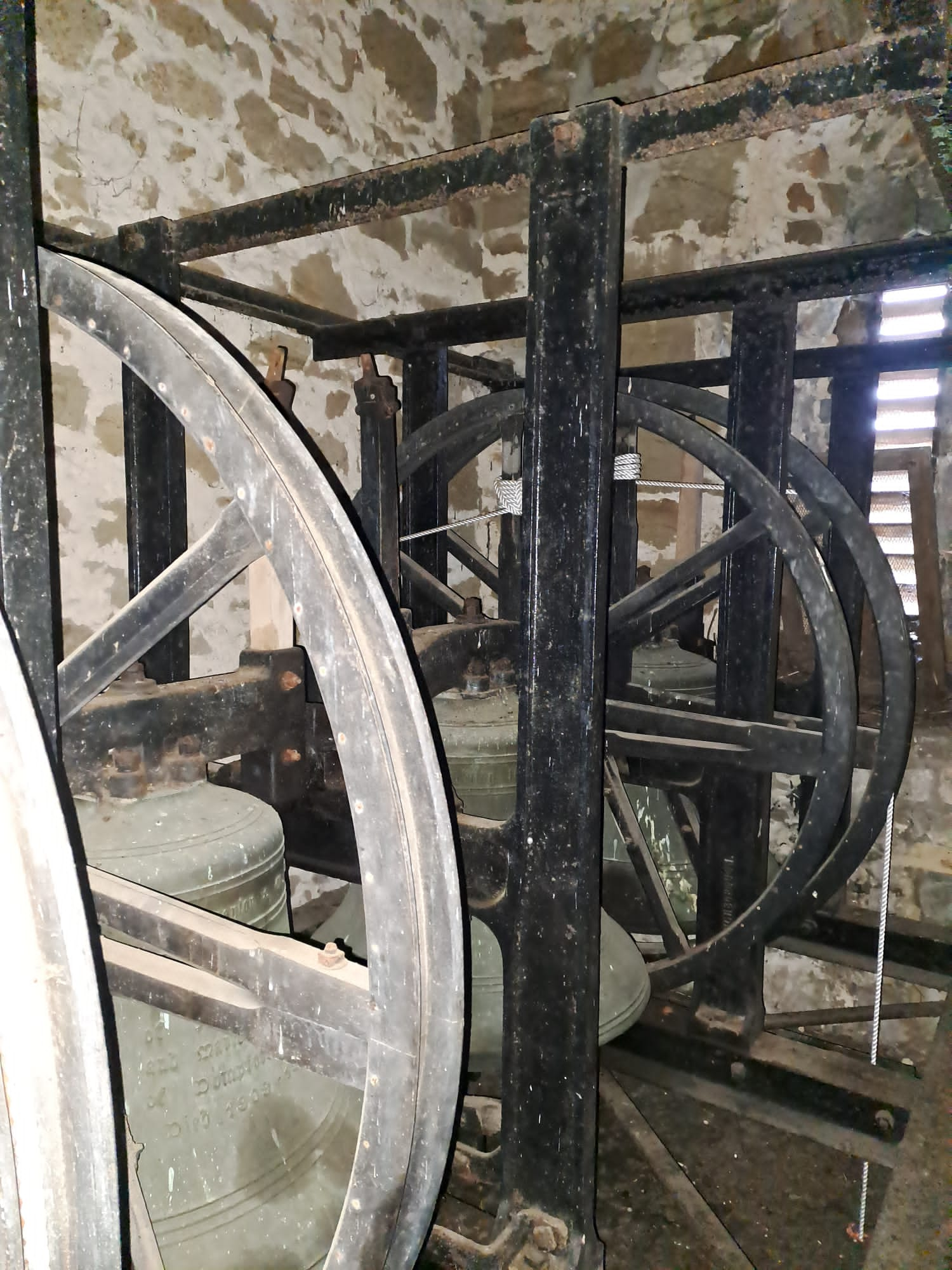
The four bells in the belfry at St George's Church, Trotton, West Sussex

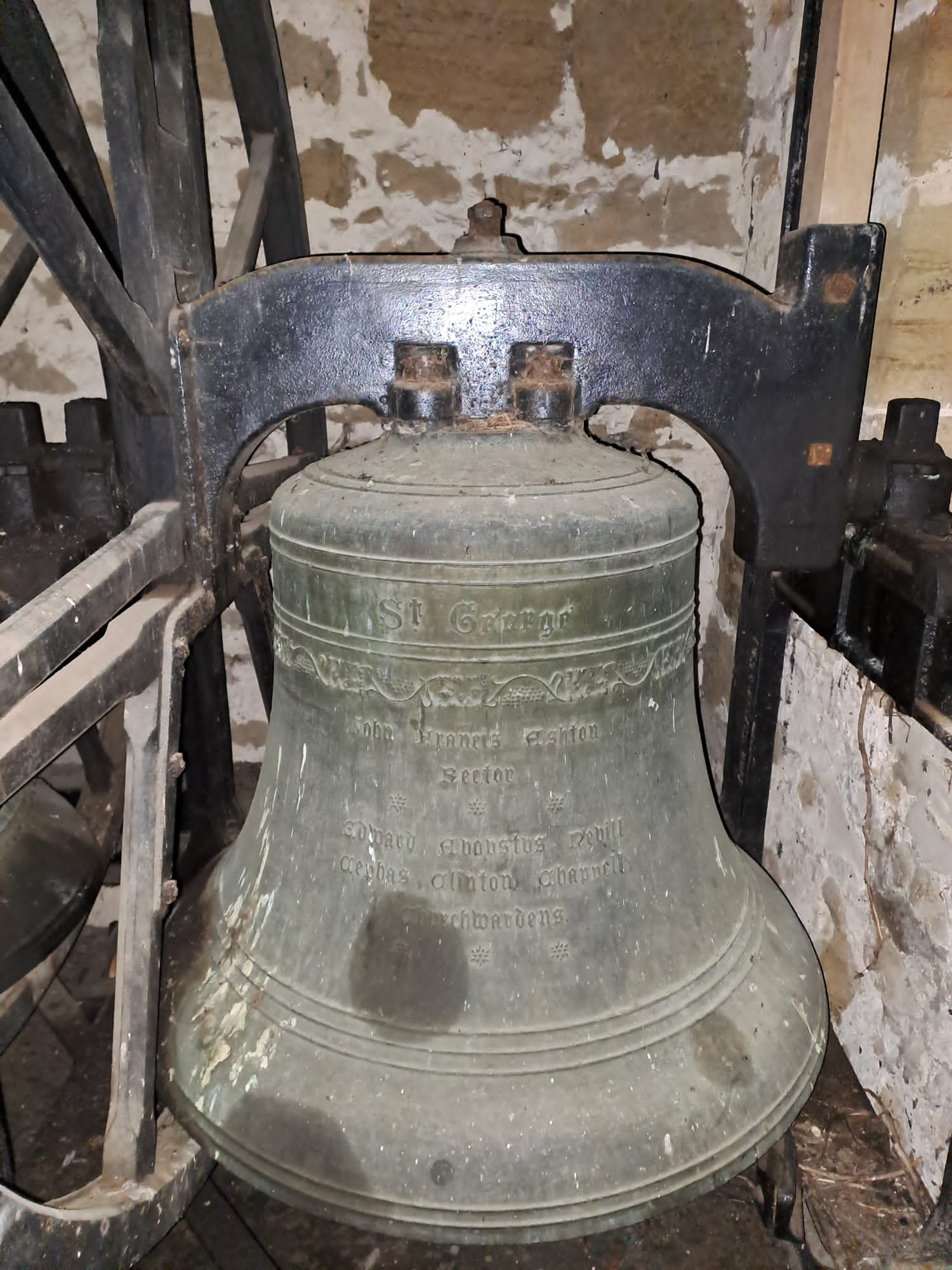
The tenor bell, cast in 1908

The tower stands at the western end of the church, and contains a ring of four bells hung for full circle English change ringing. The tenor (largest) bell dates from 1908, the others from 1913; all were cast by John Taylor & Co, at the famous Loughborough Bell Foundry.

=== Wall paintings ===
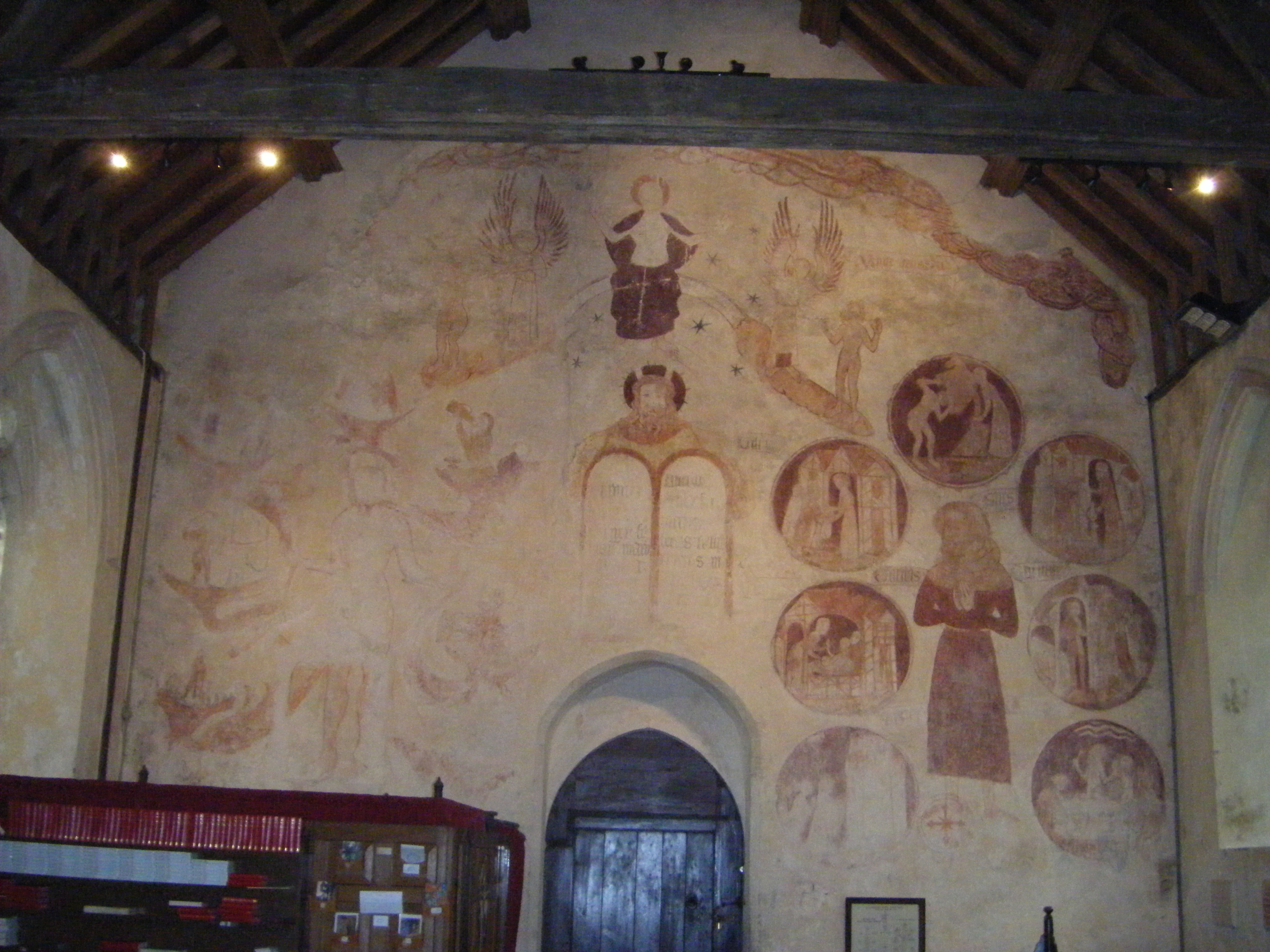
Wall painting on the west wall

In 1904, the whitewash was removed from the west wall and a wall painting from the very early days of the church was discovered. This, in itself, is not remarkable. Plenty of early churches have wall paintings; however, this one was unusually rich and detailed. In the centre is Jesus Christ, beneath him is Moses and on his right is the "Carnal Man" surrounded by the Seven Deadly Sins. On his left is the "Spiritual Man" surrounded by the Seven Acts of Mercy. These two characters are depicted on the opposite sides of Christ than is usual in such depictions of the Last Judgement. The red paintwork is mostly in good condition, although the Seven Deadly Sins have started to fade.

There are also paintings on the north and south walls depicting the Camoys family. Camoys was the lord of the manor and it appears he had the church built primarily for his family. This would explain the unusual detail in the paintings. They were intended as rich decoration rather than simply for educating an illiterate congregation.

=== Monuments ===
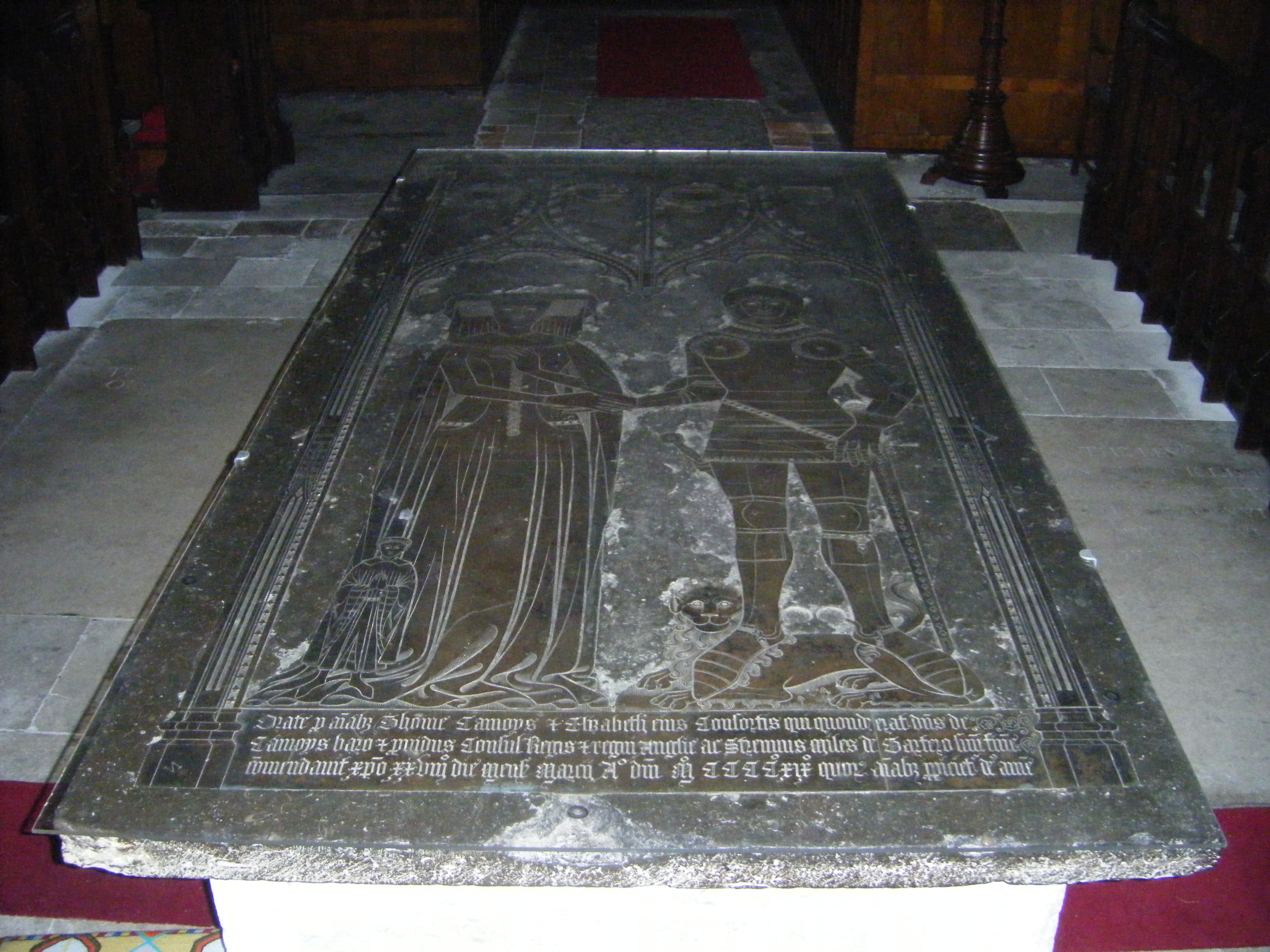
Ledger stone with a brass of Thomas de Camoys, 1st Baron Camoys (d. 1421) and his wife Elizabeth Mortimer

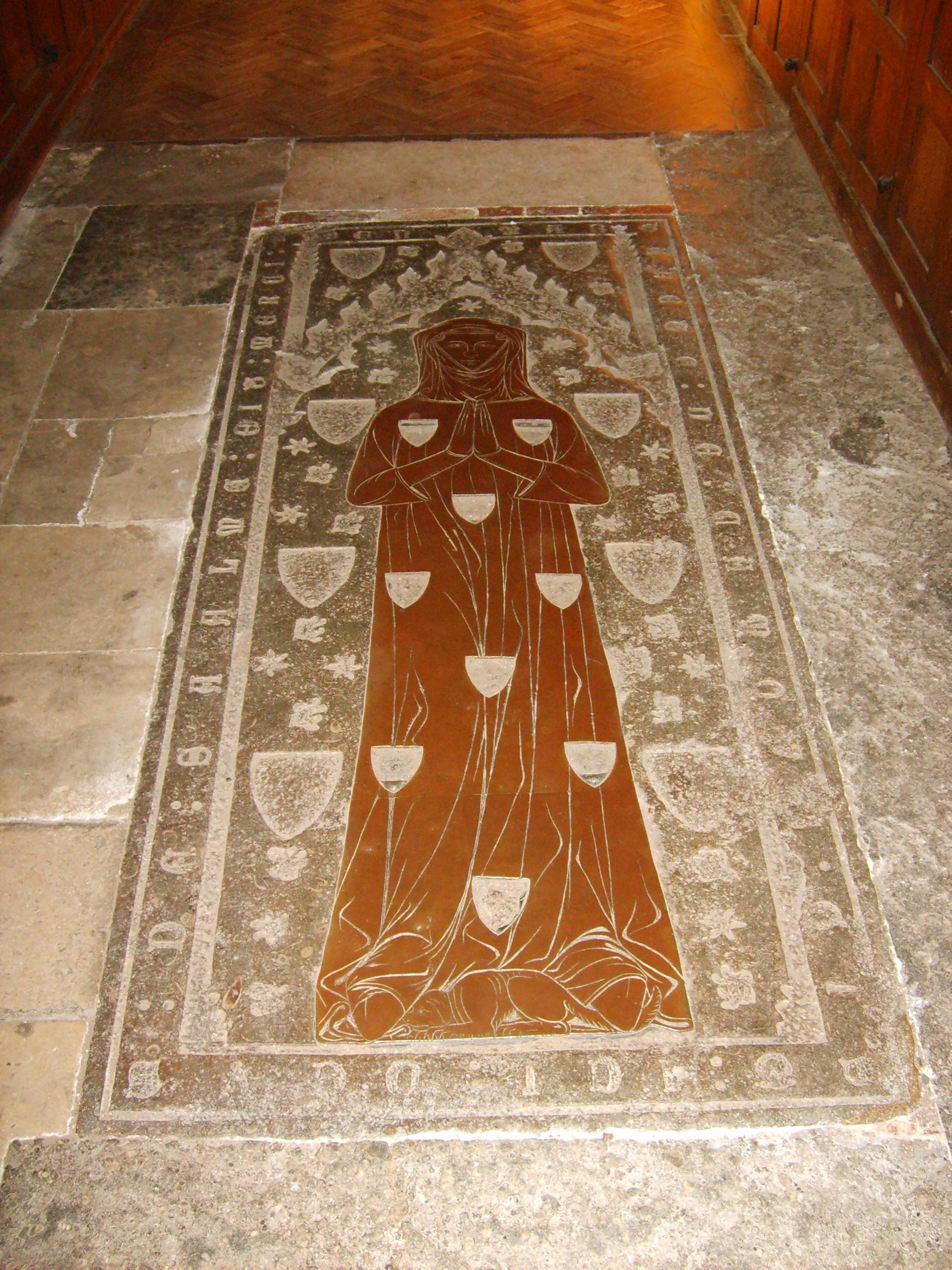
Monumental brass of Margaret, Lady Camoys (d. 1310) England's earliest surviving brass of a female figure.

A 9-foot (2.7 m) table-tomb in the middle of the chancel contains the remains of Thomas de Camoys, 1st Baron Camoys (died 1421, although the inscription states 1419) and his wife Elizabeth Mortimer, a daughter of Edmund Mortimer, 3rd Earl of March. Baron Camoys fought at the Battle of Agincourt in 1415, and his wife was the inspiration for the character of Gentle Kate in Henry IV by Shakespeare. This is an unusually large brass, the couple being depicted only slightly smaller than life-size and holding hands. The monument was described by Ian Nairn and Nikolaus Pevsner as "one of the biggest, most ornate and best preserved brasses in England".

The nave contains a ledger stone with a brass of Margaret de Camois (died 1310). This is the oldest known brass of a woman in England. A 15th-century niche-tomb existed formerly in the south wall, but had been largely removed by 1780. The table-tomb of Sir Roger Lewknor (died c. 1478) survives in the north-east corner of the chancel. Its sides display festoon motifs and slender sculpted niches. In the south-east corner is the monument to Anthony Foster (died 1643), formed with pilasters.

=== Churchyard ===
The churchyard contains a Commonwealth war grave, of a World War I soldier of the Queen's Royal Regiment (West Surrey).

== See also ==
- List of current places of worship in Chichester District
