= Harry Stonor =

British courtier

Sir Harry Julian Stonor GCVO (17 November 1859 – 5 May 1939) was a British courtier who served in several successive Royal Households of the United Kingdom.

Stonor was the son of Hon. Francis Stonor, a son of Thomas Stonor, 3rd Baron Camoys, and Eliza Peel, a daughter of Prime Minister Sir Robert Peel. In 1881 he was granted the style and precedence of the younger son of a Baron by Royal Warrant when his brother, Francis, succeeded to his grandfather's barony.

In 1883 Stonor joined the Royal Household as a Gentleman Usher and Quarterly Waiter to Queen Victoria, holding the positions until her death in 1901. He then became Groom in Waiting to Edward VII for the duration of his reign, and fulfilled the same role in the Household of George V from 1910 to 1936. From 1918 to 1921 he was Deputy Master of the Royal Household, and between 1924 and 1939 he was Secretary and Registrar of the Order of Merit. He also served as Extra Groom-in-Waiting to Edward VIII in 1936 and to George VI in 1937. Stonor was invested as a Knight Grand Cross of the Royal Victorian Order in 1933 for his services to the Royal Family. He was also a Chevalier of the Legion of Honour.

He was a devout Roman Catholic. He died unmarried in 1939.
