= Edmund Mortimer, Earl of March =

Edmund Mortimer, Earl of March may refer to:

- Edmund Mortimer, 3rd Earl of March (1352–1381)
- Edmund Mortimer, 5th Earl of March (1391–1425)
