= Francis Stonor, 4th Baron Camoys =

British aristocrat

The Right Honourable The Lord Camoys
- Camoys arms: Or, on a chief gules three plates

Personal details
- Born: Francis Robert Stonor; 9 December 1856 Oxfordshire, England
- Died: 14 July 1897 (aged 40) Mayfair, London
- Party: Liberal
- Spouse: Jessie Philippa Carew (m. 1881)
- Relations: Sir Harry Stonor (brother); Edmund Stonor (uncle); Sir Robert Peel (grandfather); Thomas Stonor, 3rd Baron Camoys (grandfather)
- Children: 4
- Parent(s): The Hon. Francis Stonor; Eliza Peel Stonor

Military service
- Branch/service: Yeomanry Cavalry
- Rank: Lieutenant

Francis Robert Stonor, 4th Baron Camoys (9 December 1856 – 14 July 1897) was a British aristocrat who served as Lord-in-Waiting to Queen Victoria.

== Early life ==
Francis Robert Stonor was born on 9 December 1856 in Oxfordshire, England. He was the eldest son of The Hon. Francis Stonor, Senior Clerk of the House of Lords, and Eliza (née Peel) Stonor (c. 1832–1883), who married in September 1855. His siblings included Hon. Sir Harry Julian Stonor, (Note: Hon. Sir Harry Julian Stonor GCVO (1859–1939) served as Gentleman Usher and Quarterly Waiter to Queen Victoria, Gentleman Usher and Groom in Waiting to King Edward VII and to King George V, Deputy Master of the Royal Household, Secretary and Registrar of the Order of Merit.) the Hon. Julia Caroline Stonor, (Note: Hon. Julia Caroline Stonor (1862–1950), who married the Marquis d'Hautpoul de Seyre in 1891.) and Maj. Hon. Edward Alexander Stonor. (Note: Maj. Hon. Edward Alexander Stonor (1867–1940), served as Principal Clerk and Taxing Master for Private Bills in the House of Lords, who married Christine Alexandra Ralli in 1899. She was the widow of Ambrose Ralli and the daughter of Richard Ralli.)

His paternal grandparents were Thomas Stonor, 3rd Baron Camoys and the former Frances Towneley, a direct descendant of William Drummond, 4th Viscount Strathallan. His father, the second son, and uncle, the first son, both predeceased his grandfather. Another uncle was the Most Rev. Edmund Stonor, the Catholic Archbishop of Trapezus, and among his nine aunts was the Hon. Harriet Stonor, the wife of Leopold Agar-Ellis, 5th Viscount Clifden.

His mother was the youngest of seven children born to his maternal grandparents, British prime minister Sir Robert Peel and his wife, Julia Floyd (the second daughter of Gen. Sir John Floyd, 1st Baronet). Among his mother's siblings were Julia Peel (wife of George Child Villiers, 6th Earl of Jersey), Sir Robert Peel, 3rd Baronet (who married Lady Emily Hay), Sir Frederick Peel, Sir William Peel, and Arthur Wellesley Peel, 1st Viscount Peel.

== Career ==
He gained the rank of Lieutenant in the Oxfordshire Yeomanry Cavalry. Upon the death of his paternal grandfather on 18 January 1881, he succeeded as the 4th Lord Camoys.

The fourth Baron was Lord-in-Waiting to Queen Victoria in 1886 and again from 1892–1895.

An enthusiastic supporter of rowing, Lord Camoys served as steward of Henley Royal Regatta, and was closely connected with the Regatta Committee.

== Personal life ==
On 14 September 1881, Lord Camoys married Jessie Philippa Carew (1857–1928) in a Roman Catholic ceremony at St Mary of the Angels, Bayswater in London. Jessie was the daughter of Robert Russell Carew of Carew & Co., Ltd and the sister of Katherine Jane Carew (wife of Sir Edward Bosc Sladen) and Helen Carew (wife of Alexander Ralli and, later, Lewis Einstein, the U.S. Minister to Czechoslovakia). In England, her father lived at Carpenders Park in Watford. They lived at Stonor Park, a 35 bedroom house in Oxfordshire, and were the parents of the following issue:

- Ralph Francis Julian Stonor (1884–1968), who married the American heiress, Mildred Constance Sherman, daughter of Sophia Brown Sherman and William Watts Sherman, in 1911.
- The Hon. Edward Maurice Stonor (1885–1931), who married Bertha Oliver, daughter of John Oliver, in 1909. They divorced in 1921 and, in 1925, he married Florence Hilda Rothschild, third daughter of Thomas William Rothschild.
- The Hon. Hugo Robert William Stonor (1887–1941), who married Esther Gilbert (1879–1971), daughter of Mark Gilbert, in 1917.
- Lt. Hon. Howard Carew Stonor (1893–1915), who was killed in action during World War I.

Lord Camoys died on Park Lane in Mayfair, London following an operation on 14 July 1897, and was buried Stonor Park Cemetery in Oxfordshire. He was succeeded in the barony by his eldest son Ralph. After his death, his widow remarried to Sir Evelyn Ruggles-Brise KCB on 3 September 1914.

Through his eldest son, he was a grandfather of Ralph Robert Watts Sherman Stonor (1913–1976), who succeeded his father to the barony.

He owned 6,700 acres mostly in Oxfordshire.

Peerage of England
Preceded by Thomas Stonor	Baron Camoys; 1881–1897	Succeeded by Ralph Stonor
