= Boxgrove Priory =

Priory in Boxgrove, West Sussex, England

Coordinates: 50°51′37.8″N 0°42′39.7″W

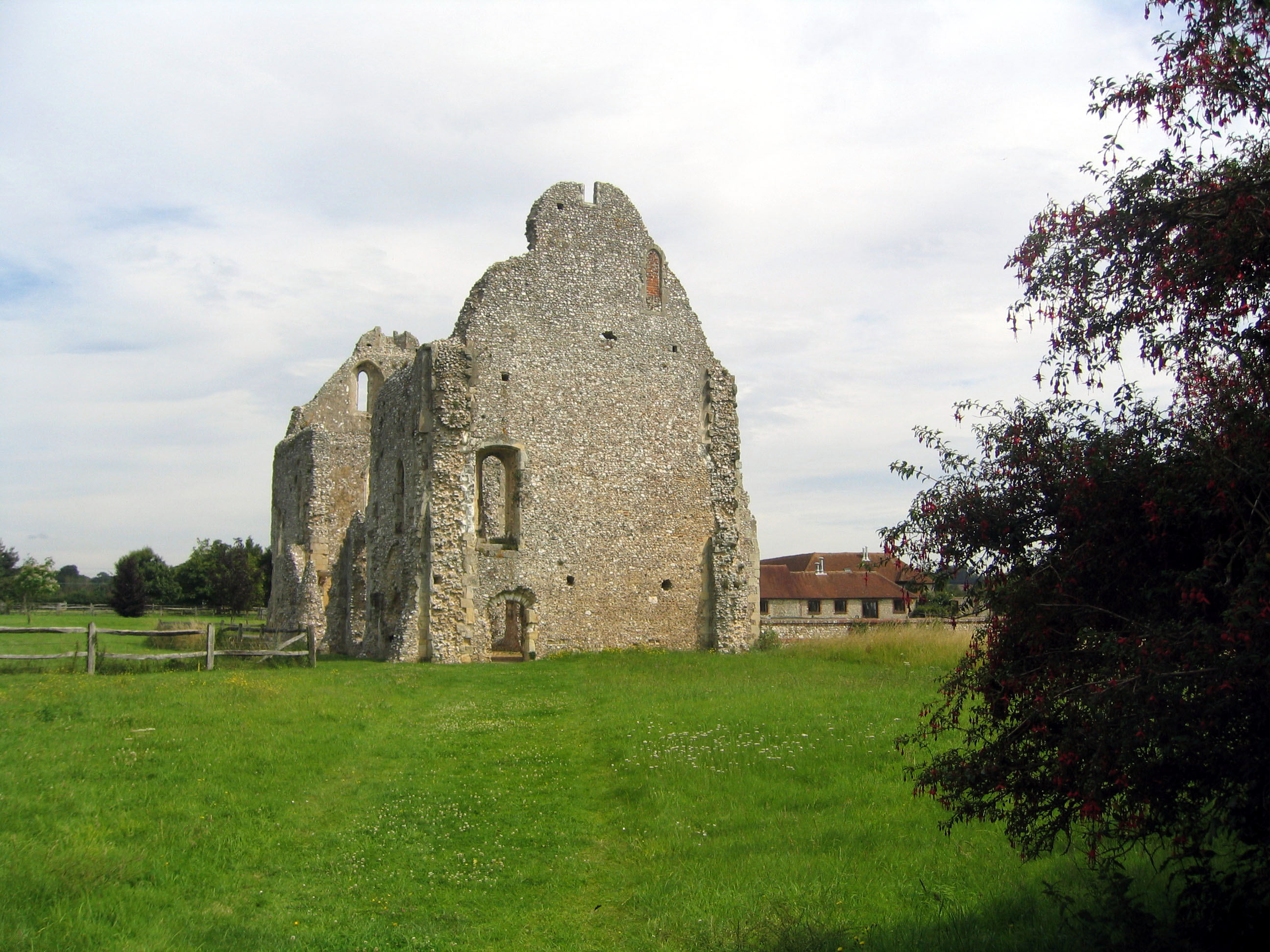
Boxgrove Priory Ruins

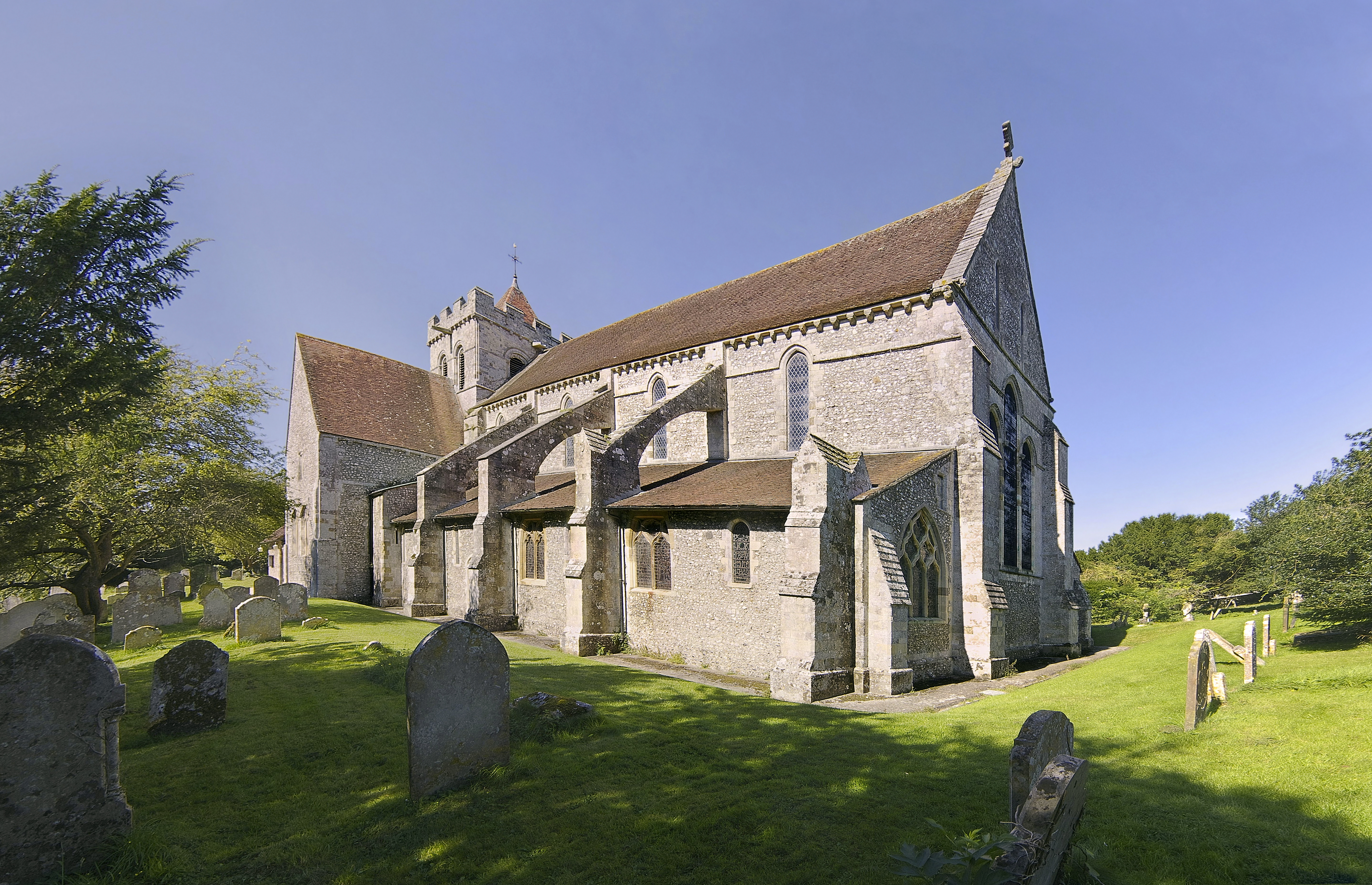
Boxgrove Priory Church

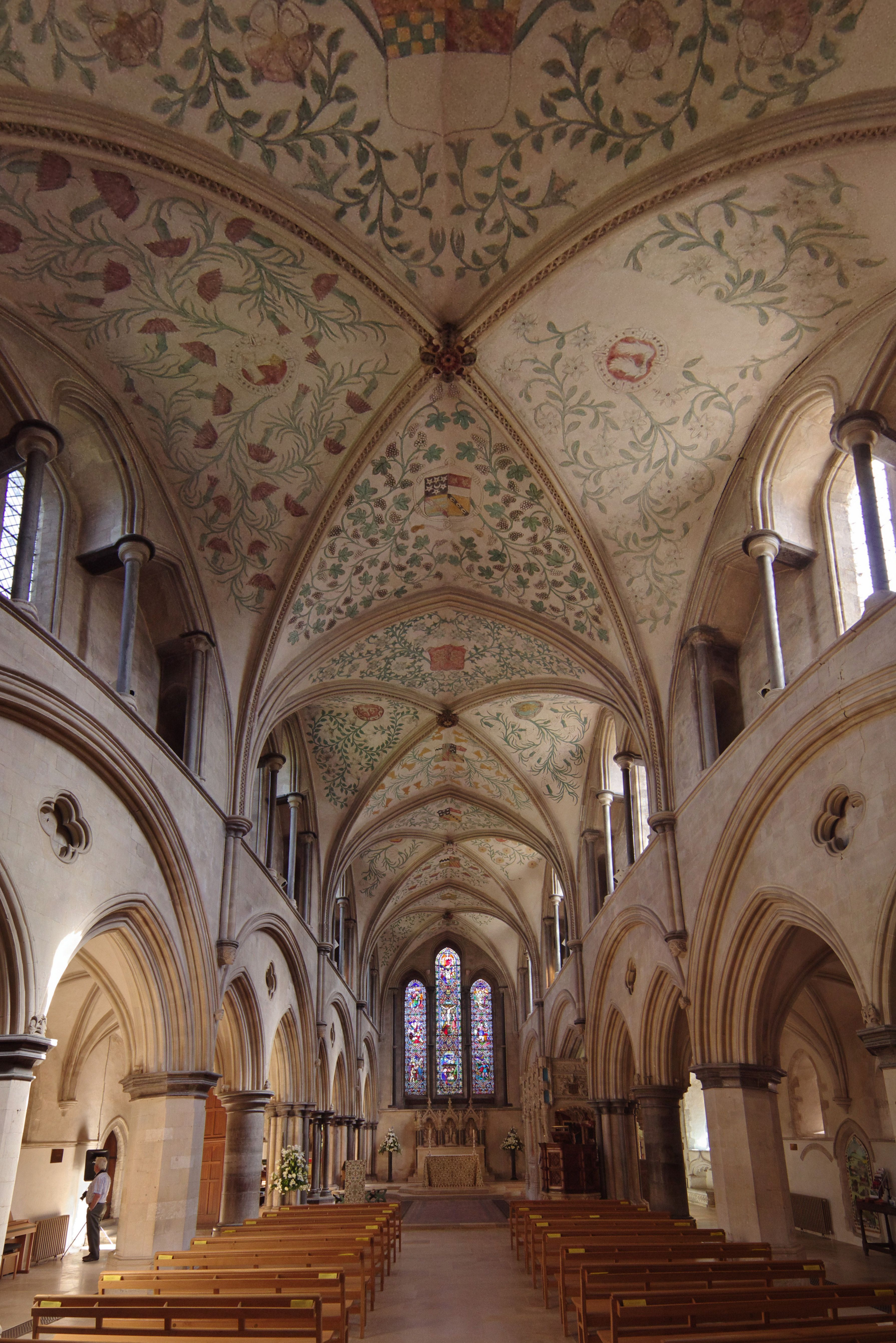
The nave

Boxgrove Priory is a ruined priory in the village of Boxgrove in Sussex, England. It was founded in the 12th century.

== History ==
=== Origins ===
The Priory was founded in the reign of Henry I, about 1123 by Robert de Haia (or de la Haye), Lord of Halnacre by gift of the king. A Saxon church had existed on the site before the Conquest. The Priory was founded for three Benedictine monks, and was a dependency by the Lessay Abbey in Normandy.

In about 1126, upon the marriage of Robert's daughter Cecily to Roger St John the number of monks living at Boxgrove was increased from the original three to six. Robert had died by 1165. By 1187 there were 15 monks. A 19th monk was added to the priory in about 1230 by William de Kainesham, Canon of Chichester.

By 1535 the priory's possessions were worth £185 19s. 8d. gross, and £145 10s. 2½d. clear.

=== Dissolution ===
The Priory was dissolved in 1536. At the time of the dissolution there were eight priests and one novice, as well as twenty-eight servants and eight children living in the priory. After the dissolution, the Priory church became the parish church.

== Modern history ==
The Priory Church is still in use as the Church of St Mary and St Blaise, a Church of England parish church.

The church is a Grade I listed building; "One of the finest medieval churches in Sussex". The ruins are separately listed as Grade I.

== Burials ==
- Lady Philippa Mortimer (died 1400)
- Thomas Poynings, 5th Baron St John

== See also ==
- List of English abbeys, priories and friaries serving as parish churches
