= Roger Camoys =

15th century English soldier and diplomat

Arms of Roger Camoys, after succeeding his father: Or, on a chief gules, three plates.

Sir Roger Camoys of Broadwater Manor, titled Lord Camoys, was an English soldier and diplomat who served briefly as the last Seneschal of Gascony in 1453, the last year of the Hundred Years' War.

== Life ==
Camoys was the second son of Thomas de Camoys, 1st Baron Camoys and Elizabeth Mortimer. He was appointed a Knight before February 1427 and was in the English army that relieved the garrison at Calais in 1436. Roger was captured in 1444 by the French. He held the office of Seneschal of Gascony in July 1453, during the last stages of English Gascony. He promptly tried to rush reinforcements to Bordeaux, Libourne, Cadillac and Blanquefort. Camoys negotiated the surrender and safe conduct of the English and Gascon lords upon the capitulation of Bordeaux after a long siege. He was later sent to Calais as a prisoner during the Wars of the Roses, where he was executed in c. 1473. His armour was granted to the Earl of Salisbury.

Roger married firstly, Isabel, of unknown parentage and had no known issue. He married secondly, Isabel de Beaunoy in 1448 by Papal licence and had no known issue.
