= Thomas Stonor, 3rd Baron Camoys =

British peer and member of Parliament

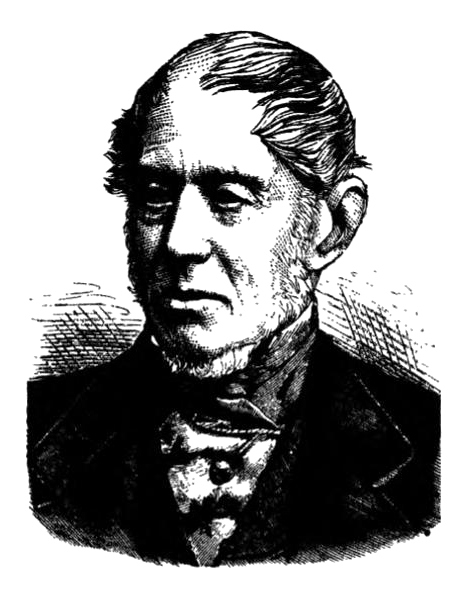
Thomas Stonor, Baron Camoys

Thomas Stonor, 3rd Baron Camoys (1797–1881) was a British peer, previously a member of Parliament. He was the son of another Thomas Stonor and Katherine Blundell, daughter of the art collector Henry Blundell.

== Career ==
In 1817, he went to study at Paris University. Stonor sat as a Member of Parliament for Oxford for the Whigs from 1832 to 1833. His election was declared void following an election petition and his brother-in-law, Charles Towneley unsuccessfully stood at the by-election that followed.

He was High Sheriff of Oxfordshire for 1836.

He succeeded to his title in 1839, after Queen Victoria terminated its abeyance in his favour. He was the appointed Lord-in-Waiting to the Queen from 1846 to 1852, 1853–1858, 1859–1866, and finally from 1868 to 1874.

== Family ==
Thomas married Frances Towneley, daughter of Peregrine Edward Towneley (1762–1846) and Charlotte Drummond of Towneley Hall, Burnley on 25 July 1821. They had the following issue:

- Charlotte (1822–1875), nun;
- Catherine (1823–1907), unmarried;
- Thomas (1824–1865), married Catherine Coulthurst, no issue;
- John (1825-1826)
- William (1826-1827)
- Robert (1828-1828)
- Francis (1829–1881), married Eliza Peel (a daughter of British Prime Minister Robert Peel), their eldest son was Francis Stonor, 4th Baron Camoys;
- Eliza (1830–1860), married Henry Silvertop;
- Edmund, a Catholic archbishop;
- Maria (1832–1914), married Charles Smythe, 7th Baronet;
- Agnes (1833–1887);
- Harriet (1836–1914), married Leopold Agar-Ellis, 5th Viscount Clifden, had issue;
- Caroline (1837–?), nun;
- Margaret (1839–1894), married Edward Pereira, had issue;
- Eleanor (1842–1886), nun;

== Death ==
Baron Camoys died on 18 January 1881. As his eldest son, Francis, had died a week before him, he was succeeded by his grandson, another Francis.

== Line of descent from earlier Baron de Camoys ==
Line of descent from earlier Baron de Camoys
- Thomas de Camoys, 1st Baron Camoys (m. Elizabeth Louches)
  - Sir Richard de Camoys (m. Joan Poynings)
    - Hugh de Camoys, 2nd Baron Camoys
    - Margaret de Camoys (m. Ralph Radmylde)
      - Margaret Radmylde (m. John Goring)
        - John Goring (m. Joan Hewster)
          - John Goring (m. Constance Dyke)
            - William Goring (m. Elizabeth Covert)
              - Henry Goring (m. Dorothy Everard)
                - William Goring (m. Ann Burbridge)
                  - Henry Goring (m. Eleanor Kingsmill)
                    - Sir William Goring, 1st Baronet (m. Eleanor Francis)
                      - Sir Henry Goring, 2nd Baronet (m. Mary Chamberlain)
                        - Ann Goring (m. Richard Biddulph)
                          - John Biddulph (m. Mary Arundell)
                            - Mary Biddulph (m. Thomas Stonor (1710–1772))
                              - Charles Stonor (1737–1781) (m. Mary Blount)
                                - Thomas Stonor (1766–1831) (m. Catherine Blundell)
                                  - Thomas Stonor, 3rd Baron Camoys

== Ancestry ==
Ancestors of Thomas Stonor, 3rd Baron Camoys

16. Thomas Stonor (1677–1724)
8. Thomas Stonor (1710–1772)
17. Hon. Winifred Roper
4. Charles Stonor (1737–1781)
18. John Biddulph (died 1720)
9. Mary Biddulph (1710–1778)
19. Mary Arundell
2. Thomas Stonor (1766–1831)
10. Michael Blount
5. Mary Blount
1. Thomas Stonor, 3rd Baron Camoys
12. Robert Blundell
6. Henry Blundell
13. Catharine Stanley
3. Catherine Blundell (died 1834)
28. Pyers Mostyn, 2nd Baronet of Talacre (died 1720)
14. George Mostyn, 4th Baronet of Talacre (died 1746)
29. Frances Selby
7. Elizabeth Mostyn
30. Charles Townley
15. Theresa Townley

== Notes ==
Parliament of the United Kingdom
Preceded by James Langston; William Hughes Hughes	Member of Parliament for Oxford; 1832–1833; With: James Langston	Succeeded by James Langston; William Hughes Hughes
Honorary titles
Preceded by John Fane	High Sheriff of Oxfordshire; 1836	Succeeded by Philip Wyndham
Peerage of England
Preceded by Abeyant	Baron Camoys; 1839–1881	Succeeded by Francis Stonor
