= Henry Percy (Hotspur) =

14th-century English noble (1364–1403)

Sir Henry Percy KG
- Statue of Harry Hotspur in Alnwick, Northumberland, erected in 2010
- Born: 20 May 1364; Northumberland, England
- Died: 21 July 1403 (aged 39); Shrewsbury, Shropshire, England
- Buried: York Minster
- Noble family: Percy
- Spouse: Lady Elizabeth Mortimer
- Issue: Henry Percy, 2nd Earl of Northumberland; Elizabeth Percy, Countess of Westmorland
- Father: Henry Percy, 1st Earl of Northumberland
- Mother: Margaret Neville

Arms of Hotspur

Sir Henry Percy (20 May 1364 – 21 July 1403), nicknamed Hotspur or Harry Hotspur, was an English knight who fought in several campaigns against the Scots in the northern border and against the French during the Hundred Years' War. The nickname "Hotspur" was given to him by the Scots as a tribute to his speed in advance and readiness to attack. The heir to a leading noble family in northern England, Hotspur was one of the earliest and prime movers behind the deposition of King Richard II in favour of Henry Bolingbroke in 1399. He later fell out with the new regime and rebelled, and was slain at the Battle of Shrewsbury in 1403 at the height of his fame.

== Career ==
Henry Percy was born 20 May 1364 at Alnwick Castle in Northumberland, the eldest son of Henry Percy, 1st Earl of Northumberland, and Margaret Neville, daughter of Ralph de Neville, 2nd Lord Neville of Raby, and Alice de Audley. He was knighted by King Edward III in April 1377, together with the future kings Richard II and Henry IV. In 1380, he was in Ireland with the Earl of March, and in 1383, he travelled in Prussia. He was appointed Warden of the East March either on 30 July 1384 or in May 1385, and in 1385 accompanied Richard II on an expedition into Scotland. "As a tribute to his speed in advance and readiness to attack" on the Scottish borders, the Scots bestowed on him the name 'Haatspore'. In April 1386, he was sent to France to reinforce the garrison at Calais and led raids into Picardy. Between August and October 1387, he was in command of a naval force in an attempt to relieve the siege of Brest. In appreciation of these military endeavours, at the age of 24 he was made a Knight of the Garter in 1388. Reappointed as Warden of the East March, he commanded the English forces against James Douglas, 2nd Earl of Douglas, at the Battle of Otterburn on 10 August 1388, where he was captured, but soon ransomed for 7000 marks.

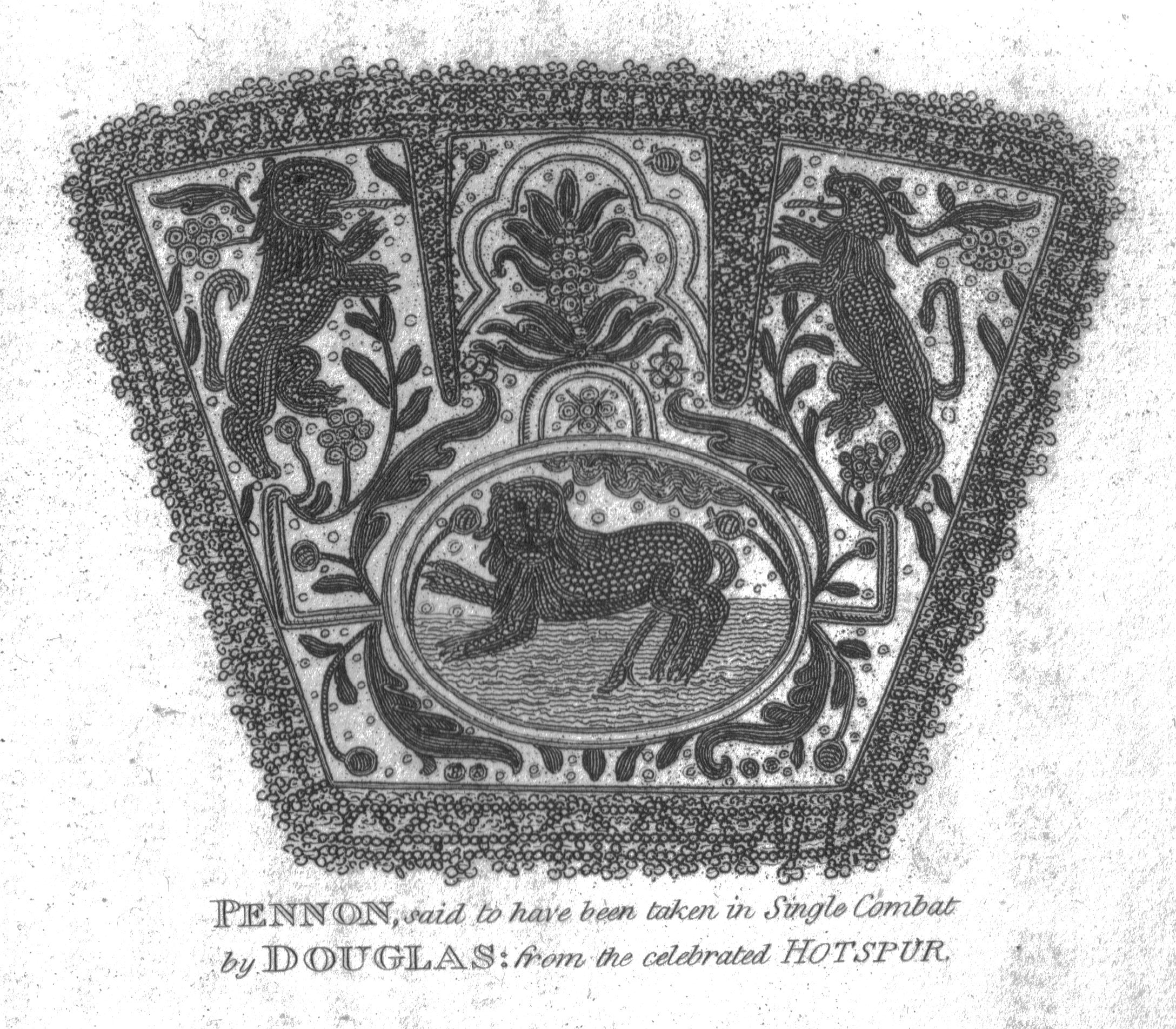
The pennon of Percy captured by James Douglas, Earl of Douglas

During the next few years Percy's reputation continued to grow. Although not 30, he was sent on a diplomatic mission to Cyprus in June 1393 and appointed Lieutenant of the Duchy of Aquitaine (1394–98) on behalf of John of Gaunt, Duke of Aquitaine. He returned to England in January 1395, taking part in Richard II's expedition to Ireland, and was back in Aquitaine the following autumn. In the summer of 1396, he was again in Calais.

Percy's military and diplomatic service brought him substantial marks of royal favour in the form of grants and appointments, but despite this, the Percy family decided to support Henry Bolingbroke, the future Henry IV, in his rebellion against Richard II. On Henry's return from exile in June 1399, Percy and his father joined his forces at Doncaster and marched south with them. After King Richard's deposition, Percy and his father were "lavishly rewarded" with lands and offices.

Under the new king, Percy had extensive civil and military responsibility in both the East March towards Wales, where he was appointed High Sheriff of Flintshire in 1399, and in the north toward Scotland. In north Wales, he was under increasing pressure as a result of the rebellion of Owain Glyndŵr. In March 1402, Henry IV appointed Percy royal lieutenant in north Wales, and on 14 September 1402, Percy, his father, and the Earl of Dunbar and March defeated a Scottish force at the Battle of Homildon Hill. Among others, they made a prisoner of Archibald Douglas, 4th Earl of Douglas.

== Rebellion, death and exhumation ==
In spite of the favour that Henry IV showed the Percys in many respects, they became increasingly discontented with him. Among their grievances were:

- The king's failure to pay the wages due them for defending the Scottish border
- The king's favour towards Dunbar
- The king's demand that the Percys hand over their Scottish prisoners
- The king's failure to put an end to Owain Glyndŵr's rebellion through a negotiated settlement
- The king's increasing promotion of his son's (Prince Henry) military authority in Wales
- The king's failure to ransom Henry Percy's brother-in-law, Sir Edmund Mortimer, whom the Welsh had captured in June 1402

Spurred by these grievances, the Percys rebelled in the summer of 1403 and took up arms against the king. According to J. M. W. Bean, it is clear that the Percys were in collusion with Glyndŵr. On his return to England shortly after the victory at Homildon Hill, Henry Percy issued proclamations in Cheshire accusing the king of 'tyrannical government'.

Joined by his uncle, Thomas Percy, Earl of Worcester, Percy marched to Shrewsbury, where he intended to do battle against a force there under the command of the Prince of Wales. The army of his father, however, was slow to move south, and it was without the assistance of his father that Henry Percy and Worcester arrived at Shrewsbury on 21 July 1403, where they encountered the king with a large army. The ensuing Battle of Shrewsbury was fierce, with heavy casualties on both sides but, when Henry Percy himself was struck down and killed, his own forces fled.

The circumstances of Percy's death differ in accounts. The chronicler Thomas Walsingham stated in his Historia Anglicana that "while he led his men in the fight rashly penetrating the enemy host, [Hotspur] was unexpectedly cut down, by whose hand is not known". Another account states that Percy was struck in the face by an arrow when he opened his visor for a better view. This is the view taken by Alnwick Castle, home of Hotspur's descendants and place where a statue of him is exhibited. The legend that he was killed by the Prince of Wales seems to have been given currency by William Shakespeare, writing at the end of the following century. The Earl of Worcester was executed two days later.

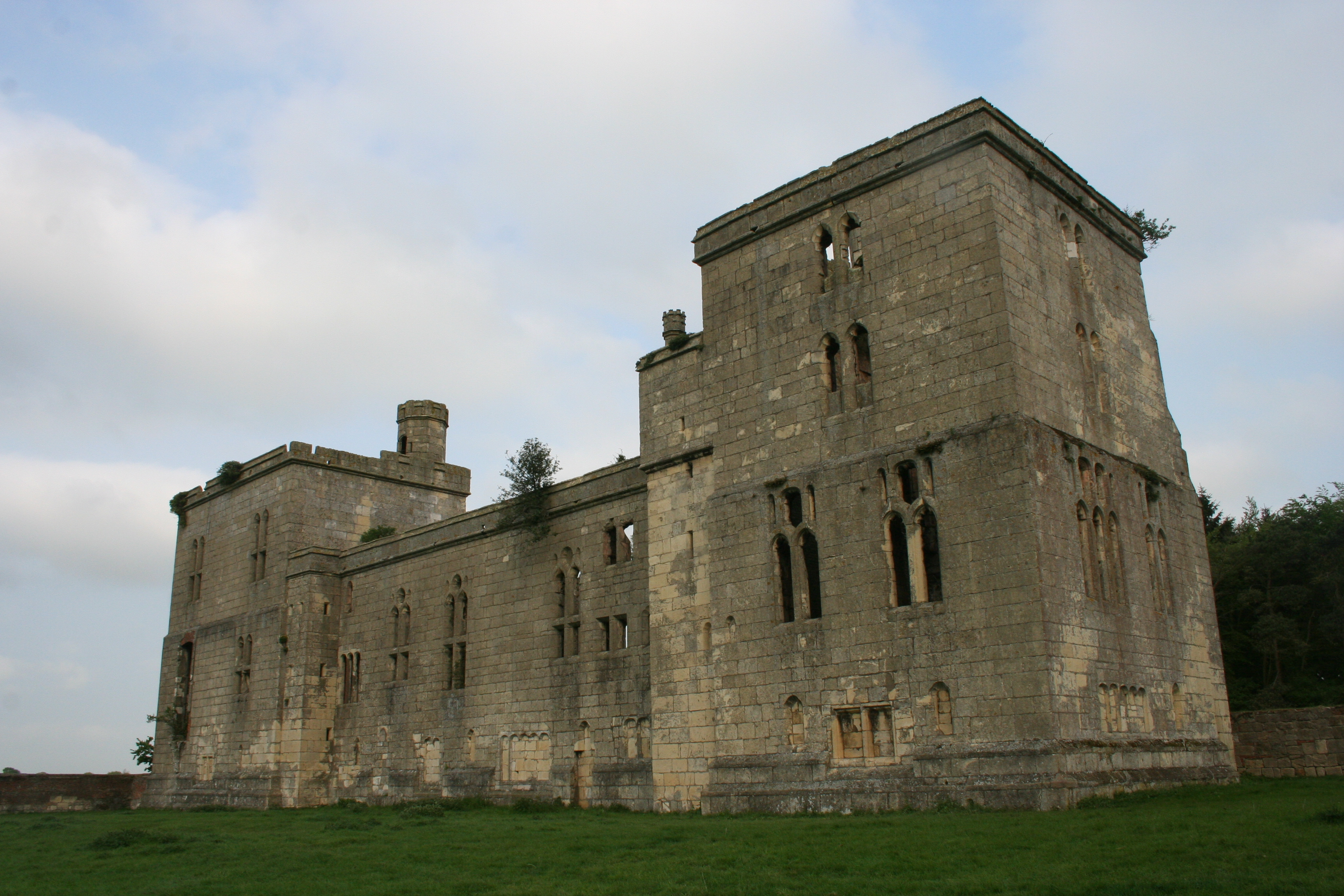
Shortly after Henry died in battle, his uncle was executed. An attainder was issued and the family's property, including Wressle Castle in the East Riding of Yorkshire (above), was confiscated by the Crown.

King Henry, upon being brought Percy's body after the battle, is said to have wept. The body was taken by Thomas Neville, 5th Baron Furnivall, to Whitchurch, Shropshire, for burial. However, when rumours circulated that Percy was still alive, the king "had the corpse exhumed and displayed it, propped upright between two millstones, in the market place at Shrewsbury". That being done, Percy was subjected to posthumous execution. The king dispatched Percy's head to York, where it was impaled on the Micklegate Bar (one of the city's gates). His four-quarters were separately displayed in London, Newcastle upon Tyne, Bristol, and Chester before they were finally delivered to his widow. She had the body buried in York Minster in November of that year. In January 1404, Percy was posthumously attainted, declared guilty of high treason, and his titles and lands were declared forfeit to the Crown.

== Marriage and issue ==
Henry Percy married Elizabeth Mortimer, the eldest daughter of Edmund Mortimer, 3rd Earl of March, and his wife, Philippa, the only child of Lionel, 1st Duke of Clarence, and Elizabeth de Burgh, Countess of Ulster. By her he had two children:

Name	Lifespan	Notes
Henry	3 February 1393 – 22 May 1455	2nd Earl of Northumberland; married Eleanor Neville, by whom he had issue. He was slain at the First Battle of St Albans during the Wars of the Roses.
Elizabeth	c.1395 – 26 October 1436	Married firstly John Clifford, 7th Baron de Clifford, slain at the Siege of Meaux on 13 March 1422, by whom she had issue, and secondly Ralph Neville, 2nd Earl of Westmorland (d. 3 November 1484), by whom she had a son, Sir John Neville.

Sometime after 3 June 1406, Elizabeth Mortimer married, as her second husband, Thomas de Camoys, 1st Baron Camoys, by whom she had a son, Sir Roger Camoys. Thomas Camoys distinguished himself as a soldier in command of the rearguard of the English army at the Battle of Agincourt on 25 October 1415.

== Legacy ==
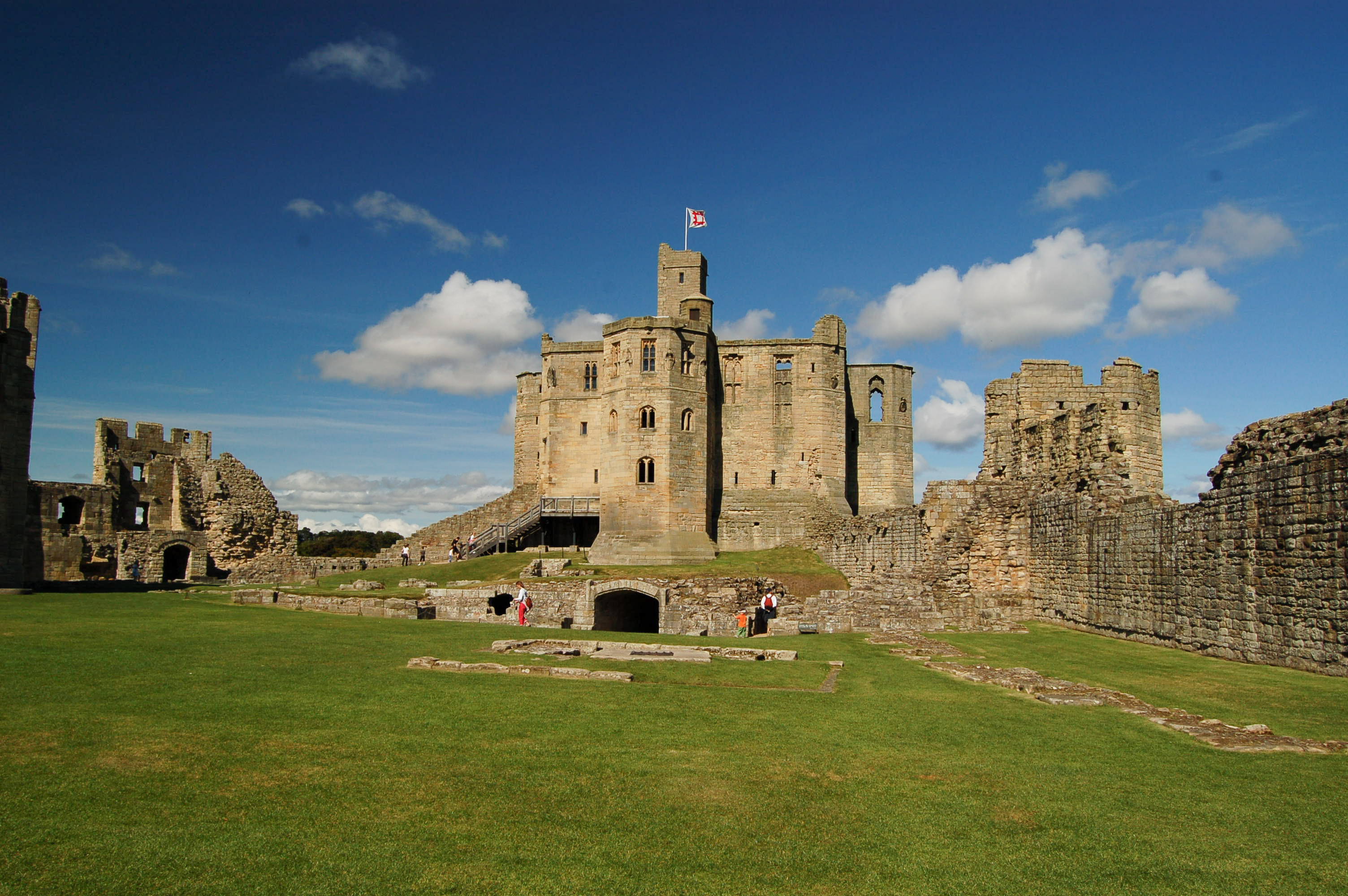
Warkworth Castle in Northumberland, the home of Henry Percy

Henry Percy, 'Hotspur', is one of Shakespeare's best-known characters. In Henry IV, Part 1, Percy is portrayed as the same age as his rival, Prince Hal, by whom he is slain in single combat. In fact, he was 22 years older than Prince Hal, the future King Henry V, who was a youth of 16 at the date of the Battle of Shrewsbury. The 2022 play The Prince by Abigail Thorn presents an interpretation of Shakespeare's fictional Hotspur as a closeted trans woman.

One of England's football clubs, Tottenham Hotspur, is named after Hotspur, who lived in the region and whose descendants owned land in the neighbourhood of the club's first ground in the Tottenham Marshes.

A 14-foot (4.3 m) statue of Henry Percy was unveiled in Alnwick by the Duke of Northumberland in 2010.

The protagonist of the video game Shadows of the Damned is named Garcia Hotspur.

Tom Glynn-Carney portrayed Hotspur in The King (2019).

Joe Armstrong portrayed Hotspur in The Hollow Crown (2013).

Sean Connery portrayed Hotspur with Robert Hardy as Prince Hal. The 1960 production was part of a BBC series An Age of Kings, a synthesis of Shakespeare's histories, with the episodes (3 & 4) featuring Hotspur first broadcast in summer 1960.

A British Airways Boeing 737-200, registered as G-BKYH, was given the name "Hotspur" in 1994, until the airline retired the aircraft.

George Percy, a member of the Percy family, is the CEO of Hotspur Geothermal, a British geothermal energy company named after Henry Percy.

A character in George R. R. Martin's fantasy world "A Song of Ice and Fire" named Ser Quentyn Ball "Fireball" was loosely inspired by Sir Henry Percy.
