= Lady Philippa Mortimer =

Medieval English noblewoman (1375–1400)

- Countess of Pembroke
- Born: 21 November 1375; Ludlow Castle, Ludlow, Shropshire, England
- Died: 26 September 1400 (aged 24); Halnaker, Sussex, England
- Spouses: John Hastings, 3rd Earl of Pembroke (m. 1389, died 1389); Richard Fitzalan, 4th Earl of Arundel and 3rd Lord St. John (m. 1390, died 1397); Sir Thomas Poynings of Basing, 5th Baron St. John (m. 1398)
- Father: Edmund Mortimer, 3rd Earl of March
- Mother: Philippa Plantagenant, 5th Countess of Ulster

Lady Philippa Mortimer (21 November 1375 – 26 September 1400) was a medieval English noblewoman, the granddaughter of Lionel of Antwerp, 1st Duke of Clarence, and great-granddaughter of King Edward III.

== Family ==
Phillipa was born at Ludlow Castle, Ludlow, Shropshire. She was the second daughter of Edmund Mortimer, 3rd Earl of March, and his wife, Philippa Plantagenet, the only child of Lionel, 1st Duke of Clarence, and Elizabeth de Burgh, Countess of Ulster. Philippa Mortimer had two brothers, Sir Roger (1374–1398) and Sir Edmund (1376–1409), and an elder sister, Lady Elizabeth Mortimer (1371–1417).

== Marriages ==
She firstly married John Hastings, 3rd Earl of Pembroke, in 1389 at Kenilworth, Warwickshire. He died on 30 December 1389, when he was 17 years old, from injuries sustained whilst jousting against Sir John Des at King Richard II's Christmas court at Woodstock Palace. They had no issue.

Her second husband was Richard Fitzalan, 4th Earl of Arundel and 3rd Lord St. John, whose first wife had died in 1385. They married on 15 August 1390 at Arundel, Sussex. The marriage took place without the grant of a Royal license and Richard was fined 500 marks. He was arrested for treason against King Richard II on 12 July 1397 and was executed on 21 September 1397. They had one son together, John FitzAlan, (b. ca 1394, d. ca 1397).

Her third husband was Sir Thomas Poynings of Basing, 5th Baron St. John. They married in 1398. They had no issue.

== Death ==
Philipa died in 1400 at Halnaker, Sussex. She was buried at Boxgrove Priory in Lewes, Sussex.
