= Hugh de Camoys, 2nd Baron Camoys =

Hugh de Camoys, 2nd Baron Camoys (1413–1426) succeeded his grandfather Thomas de Camoys as Baron in 1419.

The second Baron had no children, so the title went into abeyance between his sisters Margaret and Alianora. The title was called out of abeyance in 1839 for Thomas Stonor, a descendant of Margaret.

Peerage of England
Preceded by Thomas de Camoys	Baron Camoys; 1419–1426 then abeyant until 1839	Succeeded by Thomas Stonor
