= Philippa, 5th Countess of Ulster =

English princess and noblewoman (1355–c. 1377)

Philippa of Clarence
- 5th Countess of Ulster; 6th Baroness of Connaught
- Arms of Philippa, 5th Countess of Ulster
- Born: 16 August 1355; Eltham Palace, Kent, England
- Died: c. 1377 (aged 21–22)
- Burial: Wigmore, Herefordshire, England
- Spouse: Edmund Mortimer, 3rd Earl of March (m. 1369)
- Issue more...: Elizabeth Mortimer; Roger Mortimer, 4th Earl of March; Sir Edmund Mortimer; Lady Philippa Mortimer
- House: Plantagenet
- Father: Lionel of Antwerp, Duke of Clarence
- Mother: Elizabeth de Burgh, 4th Countess of Ulster

Philippa of Clarence also known as Philippa Plantagenet or Philippa de Burgh or Philippa of Eltham (16 August 1355 – c. 1377) was a medieval English princess and the suo jure Countess of Ulster.

== Biography ==
She was born at Eltham Palace in Kent on 16 August 1355, the only child of Lionel of Antwerp, 1st Duke of Clarence, and Elizabeth de Burgh, 4th Countess of Ulster. Her father was the second surviving son of King Edward III of England and Philippa of Hainault. She was the eldest grandchild of King Edward and Queen Philippa, her namesake.

Philippa married Edmund Mortimer, 3rd Earl of March, at the age of fourteen, in the Queen's Chapel at Reading Abbey. Her cousin, King Richard II, remaining childless, made Philippa and her descendants next in line to the throne until his deposition. In the Wars of the Roses, the Yorkist claim to the crown was based on descent from Edward III through Philippa, her son Roger Mortimer, and granddaughter Anne Mortimer, who married Richard of Conisburgh, 3rd Earl of Cambridge, a son of her uncle Edmund of Langley, 1st Duke of York.

Philippa died in around 1377, the same year as her grandfather Edward III. The precise date of her death is unknown, but Philippa had certainly died by December 1379. Her date of death is often confused with that of her mother-in-law, who died in January 1382. Philippa was buried at Wigmore Abbey, Herefordshire.

== Marriage and issue ==
Her children with Edmund Mortimer were as follows:

Name	Birth	Death	Notes
Lady Elizabeth Mortimer	12 February 1371	20 April 1417	She first married Sir Henry 'Hotspur' Percy, with whom she had two children, Henry Percy, 2nd Earl of Northumberland, and Lady Elizabeth Percy. Her second husband was Thomas de Camoys, Baron Camoys, with whom she had a son, Lord Roger de Camoys. Elizabeth Mortimer was an ancestor of the third queen consort of Henry VIII, Jane Seymour.
Roger Mortimer, 4th Earl of March	11 April 1374	20 July 1398	He married Lady Alianore Holland, by whom he had four children, Anne, Edmund Mortimer, 5th Earl of March, Eleanor, and Roger. The House of York's claim to the throne was through his eldest daughter, Anne Mortimer.
Lady Philippa Mortimer	21 November 1375	26 September 1400	She first married John Hastings, 3rd Earl of Pembroke. Her second husband was Richard Fitzalan, 11th Earl of Arundel, with whom she had a son, John, who died young. Her third husband was Sir Thomas Poynings of Basing, 5th Baron St. John.
Sir Edmund Mortimer	9 November 1376	before 13 May 1411	Married Catrin (Catherine) Glyndŵr, the daughter of Owain Glyndŵr. They had issue, possibly a son named Lionel, said to have died young, and three daughters who died in the Tower of London alongside their mother.

== Ancestry ==
Ancestors of Philippa, 5th Countess of Ulster

8. Edward II of England
4. Edward III of England
9. Isabella of France
2. Lionel of Antwerp, 1st Duke of Clarence
10. William I, Count of Hainaut
5. Philippa of Hainault
11. Joan of Valois
1. Philippa, 5th Countess of Ulster
12. John de Burgh
6. William Donn de Burgh, 3rd Earl of Ulster
13. Elizabeth de Clare
3. Elizabeth de Burgh, 4th Countess of Ulster
14. Henry, 3rd Earl of Lancaster
7. Maud of Lancaster
15. Maud Chaworth

Philippa, 5th Countess of Ulster House of Plantagenet Born: 16 August 1355 Died: 5 January 1382
Peerage of Ireland
Preceded by Elizabeth de Burgh; Lionel of Antwerp	Countess of Ulster; 1368–1382 with Edmund Mortimer	Succeeded by Roger Mortimer
