= Thomas Camoys, 1st Baron Camoys =

English peer

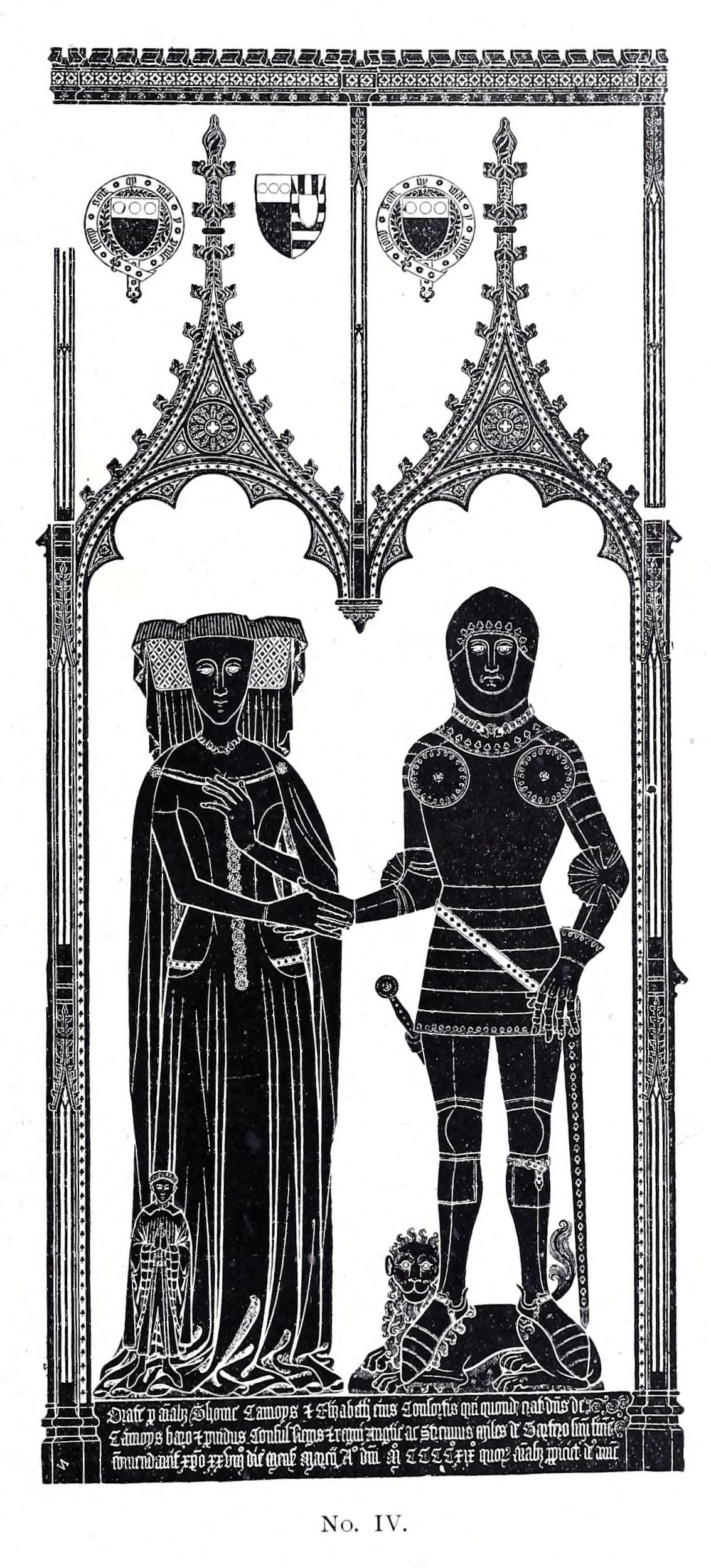
Ledger stone on top of chest tomb of Thomas de Camoys, 1st Baron Camoys, St George's Church, Trotton, 19th century brass rubbing / engraving. The arms show Camoys encircled by the Garter, and Camoys impaling Mortimer, for his second wife Elizabeth Mortimer. His son from his second marriage is depicted as a small figure standing at the feet of Elizabeth Mortimer

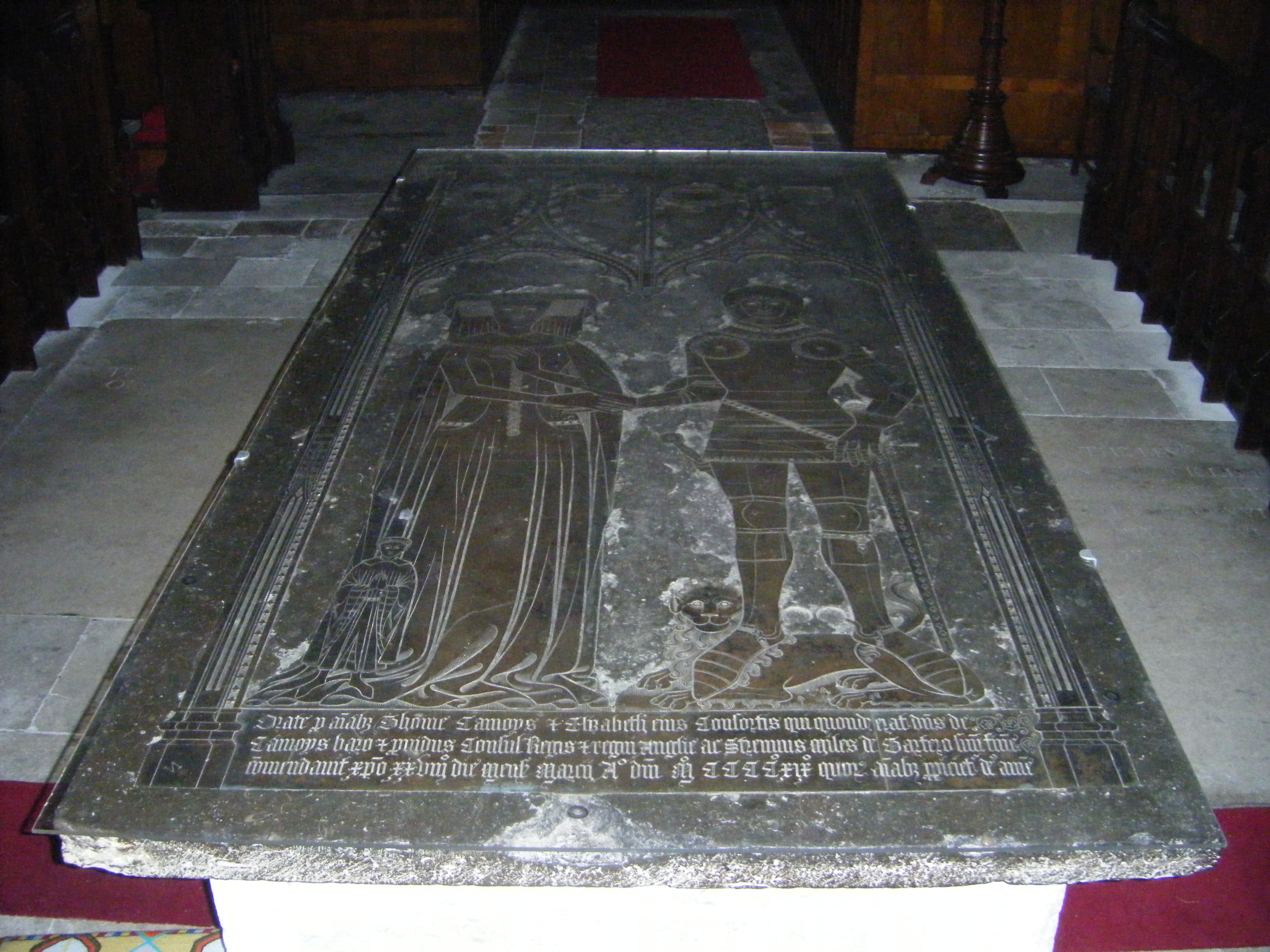
Ledger stone of Thomas de Camoys, 1st Baron Camoys, St George's Church, Trotton

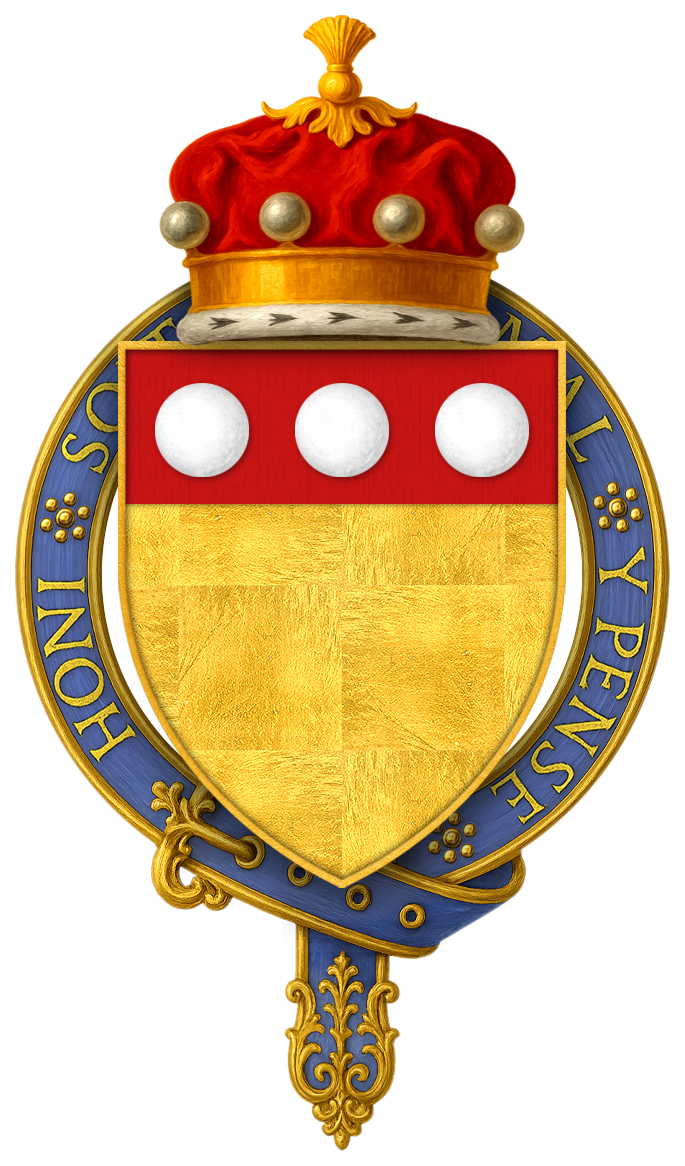
Arms of Thomas de Camoys, 1st Baron Camoys, KG: Or, on a chief gules three plates

Thomas de Camoys, 1st Baron Camoys (c. 1351 – 28 March 1421), KG, of Trotton in Sussex, was an English peer who commanded the left wing of the English army at the Battle of Agincourt in 1415.

== Origins ==
Thomas de Camoys was the son of Sir John Camoys of Gressenhall in Norfolk, by his second wife Elizabeth le Latimer, daughter of William le Latimer, 3rd Baron Latimer. Sir John Camoys was the son of Ralph de Camoys (d. 1336) by his second wife Elizabeth le Despenser, a daughter of Hugh le Despenser, 1st Earl of Winchester (executed 27 October 1326).

== Career ==
From 20 August 1383 to 26 February 1421 he was summoned several times to Parliament by writ, by which he is held to have become 1st Baron Camoys, of the second creation. The first creation of that title had expired on the death of his uncle Thomas de Camoys, 2nd Baron Camoys (d. 11 April 1372), to whom he was heir.

In 1380 Camoys was in the retinue of his cousin William Latimer, 4th Baron Latimer in an expedition to France, and was knighted by Thomas of Woodstock, then Earl of Buckingham. He later served in an expedition to Scotland in 1385.

According to Leland (d.1552), Camoys benefited little under King Richard II (1377-1399), and after Richard's deposition in 1399 he attended the first Parliament of the new king, Henry IV (1399-1413). His son, Sir Richard Camoys, was knighted by King Henry IV at his coronation, and Camoys himself escorted Henry's new queen, Joan of Navarre, to England in February 1403. His loyalty to Henry IV brought him several grants.

Prior to the embarkation for France by King Henry V (1413-1422), Camoys was present at a meeting of the King's Council held for the purpose of planning the invasion, and was appointed on 31 July 1415 to the commission which condemned to death Richard, Earl of Cambridge, and Henry Scrope, 3rd Baron Scrope of Masham, for their part in the Southampton Plot. At the Battle of Agincourt in 1415, Camoys commanded the rearguard on the left of the English line, and in recognition of his service was made a Knight of the Garter on 23 April 1416.

== Marriages and children ==
Camoys married twice:

Firstly to Elizabeth Louches, daughter and heiress of William Louches of Great Milton and Chiselhampton in Oxfordshire, by whom he had children:

- Sir Richard Camoys, son and heir apparent, who predeceased his father, having left children:
  - Hugh de Camoys, 2nd Baron Camoys, heir to his grandfather;
  - Margaret de Camoys, wife of Ralph Radmylde Esq. of Lancing
  - Alianora de Camoys, wife of Sir Roger Lewknor
- Alice Camoys, who married Sir Leonard Hastings (d. 20 October 1455) and had issue four sons and three daughters as follows:
  - William Hastings, 1st Baron Hastings;
  - Richard Hastings, Baron Welles;
  - Sir Ralph Hastings (died 1495);
  - Thomas Hastings;
  - Elizabeth Hastings, wife of Sir John Donne;
  - Anne Hastings, wife of Thomas Ferrers;
  - Joan Hastings, wife of John Brokesby.

Secondly he married Elizabeth Mortimer (died 20 April 1417), widow of Henry Percy (Hotspur), and a daughter of Edmund Mortimer, 3rd Earl of March by his wife Philippa, 5th Countess of Ulster, daughter and heiress of Lionel of Antwerp, the second son of King Edward III. By Elizabeth Mortimer he had a son:

- Sir Roger Camoys.

== Landholdings ==
Camoys inherited the manors of Trotton, Broadwater and Elsted in Sussex, and several manors in Northamptonshire from his uncle Thomas de Camoys, 2nd Baron Camoys (d.1372), By his first marriage to Elizabeth Louches he inherited the smaller of two manors at Chiselhampton, Oxfordshire. The fortified manor house at Chiselhampton (now a farm house) is still known as Camoys Court.

== Death and monument ==
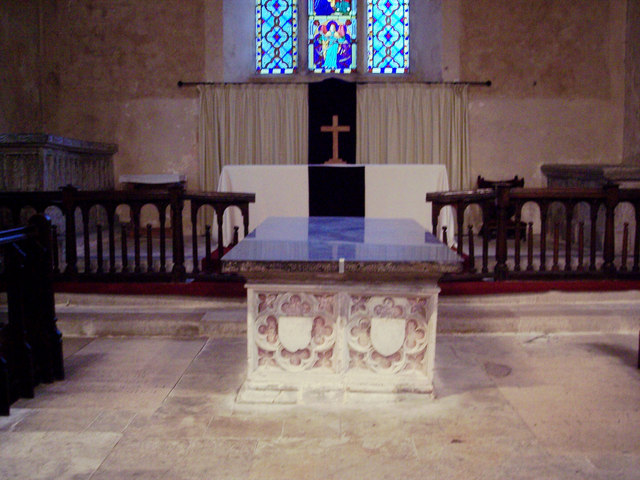
Chest tomb of Thomas Camoys, 1st Baron Camoys, chancel of St George's Church, Trotton

Camoys died on 28 March 1421 although as pointed out by Leland (d.1552), and still apparent today, the year of his death is wrongly given as 1419 (M CCCC XIX) on his brass in St. George's Church, Trotton. He was succeeded in the barony by his grandson, Hugh de Camoys, 2nd Baron Camoys. From a court record in 1422, it would appear that he died intestate, with his estate being administered by Geoffrey Colet and William Estfeld His monument survives in St George's Church, Trotton in the form of a 9-foot (2.7 m) chest tomb in the middle of the chancel on the ledger stone on top of which is a monumental brass depicting himself and his second wife Elizabeth Mortimer. The sides of the chest-tomb are decorated with sculpted quatrefoils and escutcheons. The brass is unusually large, the couple being depicted only slightly smaller than life-size and holding hands. The monument was described by Ian Nairn and Nikolaus Pevsner as "one of the biggest, most ornate and best preserved brasses in England". It is inscribed at the bottom in Latin as follows:

"Orate pro a(n)i(ma)bus Thom(a)e Camoys et Elizabeth(ae) eius consortis, qui quond(am) erat d(omi)n(u)s de Camoys baro et prude(n)s Consul Regis et regni Angli(a)e et strenuus Miles de Gartero suu(m) fine com(m)endavit Xpo xxviii die mens(is) Marcii A(nno) D(omi)ni M^{o} CCCC^{o} XIX^{o} (sic) quor(um) a(n)i(m)a(bus)[bz] p(ro)piciet(ur) Deus, Am(e)n. ("Pray ye all for the souls of Thomas Camoys and of Elizabeth his consort, who once was Lord of Camoys, a baron and a wise counsellor of the king and of the kingdom of England and a vigorous Knight of the Garter. He commended his end to Christ (ΧΡo, Christo, Chi Rho symbol) on the 28th day of the month of March in the year of our Lord 1419 (sic). On the souls of whom may God be favourably inclined, Amen").

A reproduction of the brass was published in Dallaway's Rape of Chichester, p. 224.

== Notes ==
Peerage of England
Preceded by New Creation	Baron Camoys; 1383–1419/1421	Succeeded by Hugh de Camoys
