= Elizabeth Mortimer =

14th-century English noble

- Lady Percy; Baroness Camoys
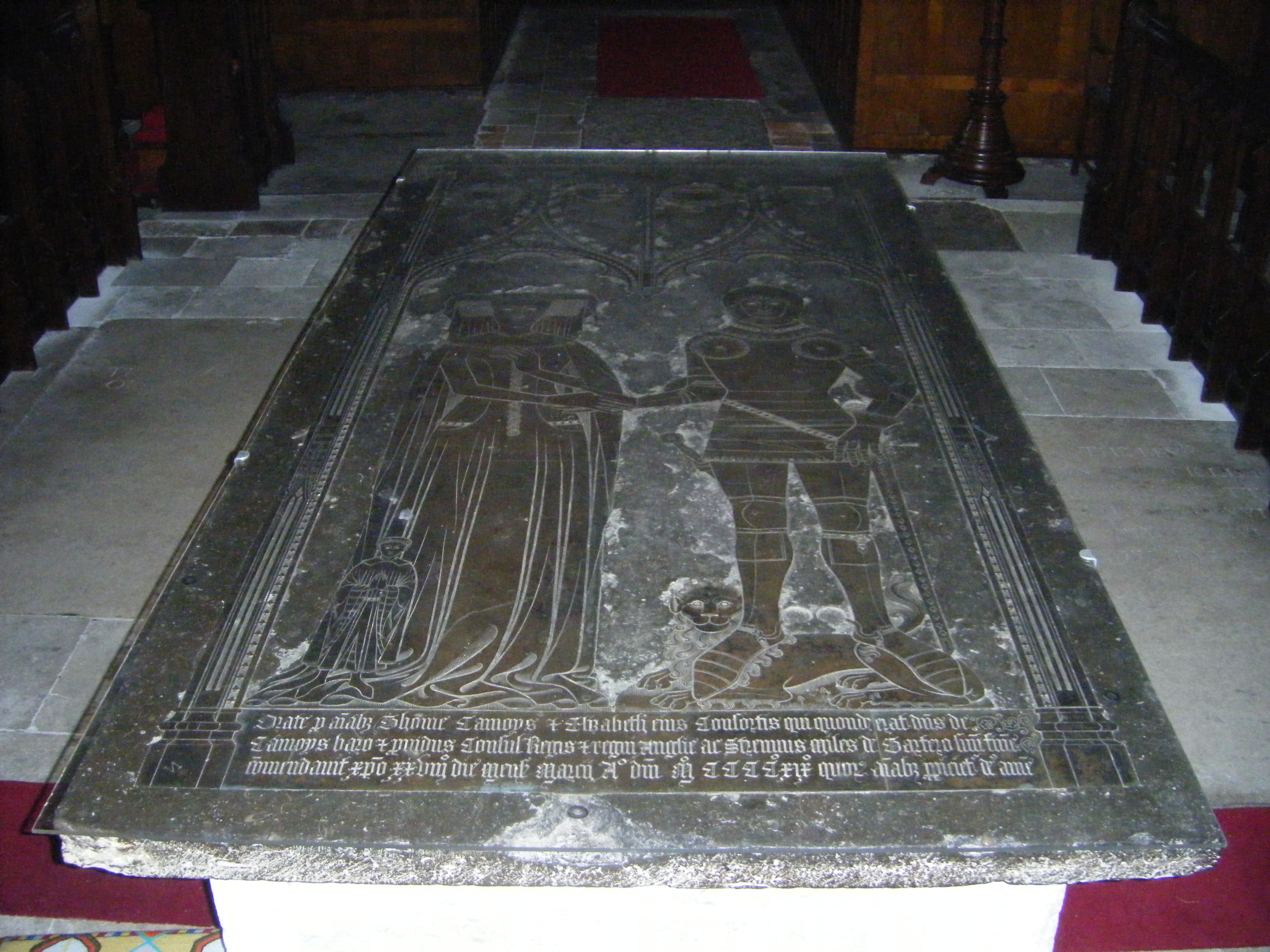
- The tomb at St. George's Church, Trotton of Elizabeth and her husband, Thomas de Camoys
- Born: 12 February 1371; Usk, Monmouthshire, Wales
- Died: 20 April 1417 (aged 46); Trotton, Sussex, England
- Noble family: Mortimer
- Spouses: Henry 'Hotspur' Percy; Thomas de Camoys, 1st Baron Camoys
- Issue: Henry Percy, 2nd Earl of Northumberland; Elizabeth Percy, Countess of Westmorland; Sir Roger Camoys
- Father: Edmund Mortimer, 3rd Earl of March
- Mother: Philippa Plantagenet, 5th Countess of Ulster

Elizabeth Mortimer, Lady Percy and Baroness Camoys (12 February 1371 – 20 April 1417), was a medieval English noblewoman, the granddaughter of Lionel of Antwerp, 1st Duke of Clarence, and great-granddaughter of King Edward III. Her first husband was Sir Henry Percy, known to history as 'Hotspur'. She married secondly Thomas Camoys, 1st Baron Camoys. She is represented as 'Kate, Lady Percy,' in Shakespeare's Henry IV, Part 1, and briefly again as 'Widow Percy' in Henry IV, Part 2.

== Family, marriages, and issue ==
Elizabeth Mortimer was born at Usk, Monmouthshire, Wales, on 12 or 13 February 1371, the eldest daughter of Edmund Mortimer, 3rd Earl of March, and his wife, Philippa, the only child of Lionel, 1st Duke of Clarence, and Elizabeth de Burgh, Countess of Ulster. Elizabeth Mortimer had two brothers, Sir Roger (1374–1398) and Sir Edmund (1376–1409), and a younger sister, Philippa (1375–1401), who married three times: firstly to John Hastings, 3rd Earl of Pembroke (d.1389), secondly to Richard de Arundel, 11th Earl of Arundel (1346–1397), and thirdly to Sir Thomas Poynings.

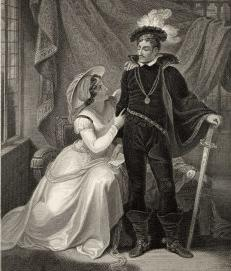
A romanticized painting of Elizabeth Mortimer and her first husband Henry "Hotspur" Percy

It is unknown when Elizabeth was married to her first husband, Henry Percy, nicknamed 'Hotspur' (1364–1403), eldest son of Henry Percy, 1st Earl of Northumberland, who was already acquiring a reputation as a great soldier and warrior and responsible administrator in the early 1390s, when they were first together. They had two children:

- Henry Percy, 2nd Earl of Northumberland (3 February 1393 – 22 May 1455), who married Eleanor Neville, by whom he had issue. He was slain at the First Battle of St Albans.
- Lady Elizabeth Percy (c.1395-26 October 1436), who married firstly John Clifford, 7th Baron de Clifford, slain at the Siege of Meaux on 13 March 1422, by whom she had issue, and secondly Ralph Neville, 2nd Earl of Westmorland (d. 3 November 1484), by whom she had a son, Sir John Neville.

On 21 July 1403, Elizabeth's husband was slain at the Battle of Shrewsbury while commanding a rebel army that fought against the superior forces of King Henry IV. He was buried in Whitchurch, Shropshire; however, when rumours circulated that he was still alive, 'Henry IV had the corpse exhumed and displayed it, propped upright between two millstones, in the market place at Shrewsbury'. This done, the king dispatched Percy's head to York, where it was impaled on one of the city's gates; his four-quarters were first sent to London, Newcastle upon Tyne, Bristol, and Chester before they were finally delivered to Elizabeth. She had him buried in York Minster, in November of that year. In January 1404, Percy was posthumously declared a traitor and his lands were forfeited to the Crown. The king ordered Elizabeth herself arrested on 8 October 1403.

Sometime after 3 June 1406, Elizabeth Mortimer was married to her second husband, Thomas de Camoys, 1st Baron Camoys. Although Camoys was in his mid-sixties, she may have had a son by him, Sir Roger Camoys. Like her first husband, Camoys was a renowned soldier who commanded the left wing of the English army at the Battle of Agincourt on 25 October 1415.

== Death ==
Elizabeth died on 20 April 1417 at the age of 46 years. She was buried in St. George's Church at Trotton, Sussex. Her second husband was buried beside her. Their table-tomb with its fine monumental brass depicting the couple slightly less than life size and holding hands can be viewed in the middle of the chancel inside the church.

King Henry VIII's Queen consort Jane Seymour was one of Elizabeth Mortimer's many descendants through her daughter Elizabeth Percy.

== In fiction ==
Lady Elizabeth is represented as Kate, Lady Percy, in William Shakespeare's plays Henry IV, Part 1 and Henry IV, Part 2. She is also the main character in Anne O’Brien's novel Queen of the North published in 2018.

== Ancestry ==
Ancestors of Elizabeth Mortimer

16. Roger Mortimer, 1st Earl of March
8. Sir Edmund Mortimer
17. Joan de Geneville, Baroness Geneville
4. Roger Mortimer, 2nd Earl of March
18. Bartholomew de Badlesmere, 1st Baron Badlesmere
9. Elizabeth de Badlesmere
19. Margaret de Clare, Baroness Badlesmere
2. Edmund Mortimer, 3rd Earl of March
20. William Montagu, 2nd Baron Montagu
10. William Montagu, 1st Earl of Salisbury
21. Elizabeth de Montfort
5. Philippa Montagu
22. William de Grandison, 1st Baron Grandison
11. Catherine Grandison
23. Sibilla Tregoz
1. Lady Elizabeth Mortimer
24. Edward II of England
12. Edward III of England
25. Isabella of France
6. Lionel of Antwerp, 1st Duke of Clarence
26. William I, Count of Hainaut
13. Philippa of Hainault
27. Joan of Valois
3. Philippa Plantagenet, 5th Countess of Ulster
28. John de Burgh
14. William Donn de Burgh, 3rd Earl of Ulster
29. Elizabeth de Clare
7. Elizabeth de Burgh, 4th Countess of Ulster
30. Henry, 3rd Earl of Lancaster
15. Maud of Lancaster
31. Maud Chaworth
