= Edmund Stonor =

British Roman Catholic archbishop

Most Rev. Edmund Stonor (13 April 1831 – 28 February 1912) was a prominent British Roman Catholic archbishop.

Born into the recusancy on 2 April 1831 at Stonor, England, the ancestral home of the Stonor family, he was the son of Thomas Stonor, 3rd Lord Camoys and Frances (née Towneley). Rev. Edmund Stonor held the office of Canon of St John Lateran, and later, as Archbishop of Trapezus.

== Career ==
On 13 April 1856, aged 25, he was ordained a priest. On 11 February 1889, aged 57, he was appointed as Titular Archbishop of Trapezus and ordained later that month. His consecration was attended by Lord William Beauchamp Nevill and his new wife Mabel Murietta, along with "most of the English visitors and residents in Rome". He was one of the episcopal consecrators of William Henry O'Connell, the future Cardinal Archbishop of Boston.

He was the "energetic, devoted chief chaplain" of the English-speaking Papal Zouaves (see dedication in Two Years in the Pontifical Zouaves by Joseph Powell, London: R. Washbourne, 1871).

== Death ==
Archbishop Stonor died on 28 February 1912, aged 80.

== Sources ==
- Charles Mosley, editor, Burke's Peerage, Baronetage & Knightage, 107th edition, volume 1, page 660.
