= Lionel of Antwerp, Duke of Clarence =

English prince and nobleman (1338–1368)

Lionel of Antwerp
- Duke of Clarence
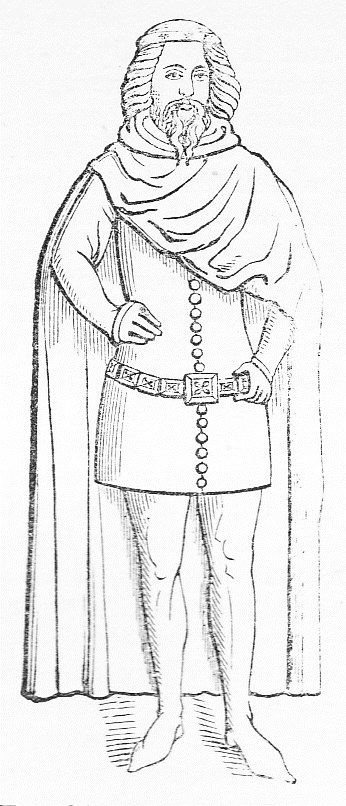
- Lionel, Duke of Clarence. 19th-century drawing of bronze statuette on south side of tomb of his father King Edward III in Westminster Abbey

Earl of Ulster
- Predecessor: William Donn de Burgh
- Successor: Philippa with Roger Mortimer
- Co-ruler: Elizabeth de Burgh
- Born: 29 November 1338; Antwerp, Duchy of Brabant (now Belgium)
- Died: 17 October 1368 (aged 29); Alba, Piedmont, County of Savoy
- Burial: Clare Priory, Suffolk
- Spouse: Elizabeth de Burgh, 4th Countess of Ulster (m. 1352; died 1363) Violante Visconti (m. 1368)
- Issue: Philippa, 5th Countess of Ulster
- House: Plantagenet
- Father: Edward III of England
- Mother: Philippa of Hainault

Lionel of Antwerp, Duke of Clarence (Norman: Leonell Duc de Clarence; 29 November 1338 – 17 October 1368) was an English prince, Earl of Ulster jure uxoris from 1347, Duke of Clarence from 1362, Guardian of England in 1345–46, Lord Lieutenant of Ireland in 1361–66, Knight of the Garter from 1361, third son (second surviving) of King Edward III of England and Philippa of Hainault. He was named after his birthplace, at Antwerp in the Duchy of Brabant.

In 1355–60, Lionel took part in the Hundred Years' War with France and the Second War of Scottish Independence. After the Treaty of Brétigny, much of the Prince's later career was linked to Ireland. Through his first marriage to Elizabeth de Burgh, 4th Countess of Ulster, he inherited large holdings in Northern, Western and South-Western Ireland, as well as the title of Earl of Ulster. In 1361, Edward III appointed his son the royal lieutenant (viceroy) of Ireland, and in 1362 he created the title of Duke of Clarence for him, making Lionel the first among the Irish peers. The prince remained viceroy until 1366 (with two short breaks in 1364 and 1365, when he went to England). During this time, Lionel led several military campaigns on the island and adopted the Statutes of Kilkenny in February 1366, which became his most important legacy for the Irish government.

Lionel's first wife died in 1363. In 1367, Edward III arranged a new marriage for his son with Violante Visconti, whose father was the ruler of Milan. A lavish marriage ceremony took place in May or June 1368, but Lionel died soon after, possibly poisoned by his father-in-law. He left one daughter, Philippa, from his first marriage. In the 15th century, the House of York justified their preemptive right to the English throne through their descent from Lionel and Philippa.

== Life ==
=== Origins ===
Lionel patrilineally descended from the English royal House of Plantagenet. His father was Edward III, King of England since 1327 and his mother was Philippa of Hainault, who came from the French Avesnes family. His paternal grandparents were King Edward II of England and Isabella of France, and his maternal grandparents were William I, Count of Hainaut, Holland and Zeeland and Joan of Valois. Edward III and Philippa had 12 children in the course of their marriage. Lionel was the fifth born child and the third but second surviving son (one of his older brothers, William of Hatfield, died in infancy in 1337). Of the other brothers, the eldest, Edward the Black Prince, was the heir to Edward III. Lionel also had four younger brothers (three of them survived infancy: John of Gaunt, Duke of Lancaster, Edmund of Langley, 1st Duke of York, and Thomas of Woodstock, Duke of Gloucester), as well as five sisters, of whom only the eldest, Isabella, Countess of Bedford, survive to adulthood.

=== Birth and early years ===
Lionel was born on 29 November 1338 at St. Michael's Abbey in Antwerp, while his parents were living in the Low Countries. (Note: Edward III and his family lived in the Low Countries during the first period of the Hundred Years' War with France.) Gilles de Monte, a doctor from Hainault, took care of the newborn prince for 13 weeks, for which he received a reward of £15 . Due to the place of birth, Lionel received the nickname "of Antwerp".

There are several versions explaining the unusual name that Edward III gave to his son. According to one of them, it is a reference to the Lion of Brabant —the heraldic symbol of John III, Duke of Brabant, one of the allies of the English king at that time. However, according to modern researchers, the choice of name is more likely due to the fact that Edward III, who adored the legends of King Arthur, at that time identified himself with one of the Knights of the Round Table —Sir Lionel, often participating in jousting tournaments with his coat of arms (for example, at a tournament in Dunstable in 1334). In addition, the name had an obvious association with the heraldic lions (more precisely, leopards) depicted on the English coat of arms. According to another version, Edward III decided to revive the "Welsh name Llywelyn".

Lionel's godfather was William Montagu, 1st Earl of Salisbury. Previously, the king had granted the earl the privilege of wearing the royal arms bearing an eagle; in 1339 Salisbury's godson received the same privilege.

Already at the age of 3, Lionel was included in the dynastic policy of his father, who sought to ensure the inheritance of his sons. Back in 1333, William de Burgh, 3rd Earl of Ulster and 6th Baron Connaught, the head of one of the largest Anglo-Norman families in Ireland, died. From his marriage to Maud of Lancaster, he left an only daughter, Elizabeth, who inherited the de Burghs' large estates in Ireland. On 9 September 1342, Lionel and Elizabeth de Burgh were married in the Tower of London. The composition of the possessions inherited by Lionel as a dowry included large holdings in Connaught, Munster, and Ulster, located in Northern, Western and Southwestern Ireland.

The marriage was consummated in 1352, but no later than 26 January 1347, Lionel was recognized Earl of Ulster jure uxoris (by right of his wife). Apparently, Edward III wanted to make his son the largest Irish magnate. However, during this period, the power of the Gaelic clans increased. In addition, other representatives of the de Burgh family made claims to Ulster. As a result, the governors who ruled on Lionel's behalf had effective control over only a very limited area. To remedy this situation, Edward III married Maud of Lancaster, Elizabeth's mother, to Sir Ralph de Ufford, brother of his close friend Robert Ufford, 1st Earl of Suffolk. In 1345, Edward appointed Ralph as Justiciar of Ireland and gave him the task of restoring the County of Ulster. But Ralph died in 1346 and Edward's plans came to nothing. It was only 15 years later that Lionel gained control of Ireland.

One of the reasons for the delay in gaining power in Ireland was the war that Edward III waged against France. When the English king went to Flanders in July 1345, Lionel was appointed Guardian (Regent) of England from 3 to 26 July. He held the same position from 11 July 1346 to 12 October 1347, when Edward III conducted a long military campaign in France, ending with the Siege of Calais and the Battle of Crécy. Since Lionel at this time, due to his age, could not independently manage the kingdom, a council exercised royal power on his behalf. Nevertheless, in the second period, the regent was provided with a personal seal at the expense of the king, which allowed Lionel to solve a limited range of administrative duties assigned to him personally. Documents surviving bearing this seal show that the prince's personal household was successively located during this period at the Tower, Windsor, Reading (most of 1347), and Bristol.

=== Participation in the wars with France and Scotland ===
In 1355, Lionel's military career began: in that year he was knighted, after which he accompanied his father to Calais and took part in an unsuccessful raid on French lands. During his participation in the French expedition, Lionel's wife Elizabeth de Burgh gave birth to a daughter on 16 August 1355 at Eltham Palace: named Philippa after her paternal grandmother, she was Lionel's only legitimate offspring but also the eldest grandchild of Edward III and Philippa of Hainault, and thus a potential heiress of the English throne.

In the winter of 1355–1356, Lionel took part in the royal army's invasion of Scotland. In the treaty in which the Scottish claimant Edward Balliol renounced his rights to the Scottish throne in favor of the English king, the prince's name headed the list of witnesses.

In May 1359, Lionel fought in a jousting tournament held in Smithfield, London. From October 1359 to May 1360, he participated in his father's military campaigns, including the unsuccessful siege of Reims (Note: Edward III took the crown with him on this campaign and, most likely, intended to officially become the French king at the traditional site of the Capetian coronation. However, Reims was well fortified, as a result the British did not even try to capture the city, and after 5 weeks in January 1360 the siege was lifted. Next, Edward III led the army through Burgundy, setting up a chevauchée. It is unknown whether this was originally planned, but Duke Philip I of Burgundy was forced not only to offer a ransom of 700 thousand gold écus (£166,666) for the withdrawal of the English army from his possessions, but also to promise that, as a peer of France in the future, he would support Edward's coronation. By marching on Paris, the English king failed to provoke the French Dauphin Charles into battle, so he moved south along the Loire Valley. At Chartres, the English army was caught in a storm on 13 April, which killed men and horses. The army was weakened by the winter campaign, during which the weather was bad, and demoralized. As a result, Edward III decided to return to peace negotiations.) and later the peace negotiations at Brétigny.

On 2 December 1360, John Beauchamp, 1st Baron Beauchamp of Warwick, one of the Knights of the Order of the Garter, died. In April 1361, Edward III held a ceremony, giving the vacant seat in the Order to Lionel.

=== Lord Lieutenant of Ireland ===
The peace between England and France concluded at Brétigny in 1360, which lasted until 1369, finally allowed Lionel to take the role in Ireland that his father had planned for him. In July 1360, representatives of the Anglo-Irish political community approached Edward III, begging him to send them a leader who would have sufficient power and resources to restore order to the troubled island. In addition, on 4 November 1360, Elizabeth de Burgh's grandmother, Elizabeth de Clare, died, after which her share of the de Clare estates in England and Wales, as well as lands in the County of Ulster that belonged to her as a widow's share, came into the possession of Lionel by right of his wife. On 15 March 1361 the English king announced his intention to send his son to rule the possessions on the island, and on 1 July he appointed Lionel Lord Lieutenant of Ireland.

In the middle of the 14th century, English possessions in Ireland had to be constantly defended. Although Edward III formally claimed power over the entire island, in essence the local clans were almost independent. English dominance in the vast lands beyond the Bann and Shannon rivers was exercised irregularly and with great difficulty. Even the heartland of the English possessions, which included the lands around Dublin, was at times threatened by a number of Gaelic clans such as the O'Brien, O'Toole and Mac Murhi. As a result, in English-controlled lands, royal power was only effective if it met with the tacit support of the local aristocracy, particularly the Earls of Desmond, Ormonde, Louth and Kildare. They, like other representatives of the local colonial aristocracy, sharply criticized Edward III's disdainful attitude towards power in these domains. It was alleged that in 1346 Maurice FitzGerald, 1st Earl of Desmond, even sent envoys to Pope Clement VI asking him to take Ireland under his jurisdiction, appointing the Earl himself as vicar there. Although representatives of the local nobility demanded the regular intervention of the English king in the affairs of the Irish honors, (Note: Honor (English: honour) is a term denoting land holdings that provided one title.) "Englishmen born in Ireland" (as the local Anglo-Norman barons were often called) had completely different political views than "Englishmen born in England" (this was the name given to royal governors and other officials sent by the English government to Ireland). And such views became a serious problem for the Duke of Clarence.

Edward III believed that "our Irish dominions are reduced to such complete desolation, ruin and misery, that they may be completely lost unless relief is immediately given to our subjects." At Easter a large meeting of the English landowners in Ireland was held, and they were ordered to provide the prince with soldiers and accompany him to defend their estates. Lionel was given the task of restoring the devastated position of the English colony on the island by demonstrating the military power of the English crown. He landed in Dublin in September 1361, accompanied by his wife and many large landowners. They were accompanied by a military detachment consisting of about 50 knights, 300 men-at-arms and 540 horse archers. In addition, the Duke was allocated sufficient financial resources to hire an additional army in Ireland itself. The original plan to recruit 800 foot archers in Wales appears to have failed.

Apparently, Lionel began to fulfill the duties of Lord Lieutenant of the English possessions in Ireland quite diligently. Almost immediately after landing, he launched a raid on Wicklow, where a Gaelic army had gathered and was threatening the English settlements around Dublin. In the city itself, which Lionel used as his personal headquarters, he had a castle renovated. At the same time, part of the government was transferred to Carlow, which made it possible to increase the efficiency of the military administration of the Irish honors. During the invasion of the O'Byrnes, Lionel lost a hundred mercenaries and was soon glad to rely on the help of the Irish lords.

To strengthen his son's position, Edward III in 1362 repeated the orders of the Anglo-Irish nobility that he had given the year before. In addition, at a meeting of Parliament on 13 November 1362, the king created for his son a new title, Duke of Clarence. The name of the title came from the city, castle and honor of Clare, which he owned as his wife's dowry. As a result, Lionel became the first Irish peer. At the same time, while in Ireland, he could not manage his wife's estates in England, so his salary was increased. The size of the army also doubled.

Early in 1362, Lionel arrived in Drogheda and later that year led a military campaign in Meath. On 22 April 1364 James Butler, 2nd Earl of Ormonde, was appointed as Lord Lieutenant of Ireland, while the Duke of Clarence returned to England to consult his father and the royal council. On 24 September, Lionel was again appointed Lord Lieutenant and returned to Ireland in December, when he campaigned from Cork through Trim to Drogheda. He continued to try to gain real control over the estates of his wife, who died in 1363. Although his father did his best to provide his son with supplies, Lionel only managed to gain control of a small part of the east coast of Ulster. His constant attempts to rule Ireland through the English led to serious conflict between the "English by birth" and the "English by blood", but Edward III attempted to reconcile the two in order to unite both factions to wage war against the native Irish.

In 1365, Lionel again traveled briefly to England, leaving Thomas de la Dale in charge of Ireland. On his return, he convened a parliament in Kilkenny in February 1366. It adopted the Statutes of Kilkenny, which became Lionel's most important legacy for the Irish government. It was aimed at preventing the process of cultural and political "degeneration" among Irish-born Englishmen. In particular, the king's subjects were prohibited from using the Irish language, marrying Irish women, and observing Irish laws. In addition, the distinction between "English by birth" and "English by blood" was eliminated as far as possible. Although there was little new among the rules introduced, their codification in 1366 led to the fact that the provisions of the statutes were in force in Ireland until the beginning of the 17th century.

On 7 November 1366, Edward III replaced his son (tired of this thankless job) as Lord Lieutenant of Ireland with Gerald FitzGerald, 3rd Earl of Desmond, after which Lionel left the island, vowing —according to the author of the Eulogium historiarum— never to return there. His contribution to the English management of the Irish honors is assessed ambiguously. On the one hand, the Duke of Clarence, during the period of administration of the English colony, made the first attempt to force landowners to contribute to the protection of royal possessions. Lionel also managed to achieve some military successes, capturing Art Mor Mac Murdach, the Gaelic leader who caused the greatest trouble for the English; he died in English captivity. On the other hand, the rule of the Duke of Clarence demonstrated that the Irish honors was no longer self-sustaining, since English power in the colony could only be maintained with military and financial assistance from the royal government. When the interests and resolve of the crown weakened, the allocated resources quickly disappeared. Moreover, the political rhetoric of the Irish parliaments of that period does not suggest that the local aristocracy sensed any noticeable changes in the regime of the English kings; the Statutes of Kilkenny above all demonstrated the conflict between the official policy of the English government and the realities of Anglo-Irish political culture.

=== Second marriage and death ===
After Lionel left Ireland, Edward III appears to have outlined a new role for him in his dynastic strategy. Elizabeth de Burgh, first wife of the Duke of Clarence, died in Dublin in 1363. Her body was transported to England at the expense of the crown and buried in the de Burgh family vault at Clare Priory in Suffolk. (Note: Clare Priory is traditionally considered the burial place of Elizabeth de Burgh, but the National Archives contains an account of the expenses of Nicholas of Flaidbury and John de Neuborne, who, on behalf of Lionel, accompanied the body of his late wife to the funeral at Bruisyard Abbey in Suffolk.) On 30 July 1366, Edward III sent a diplomatic mission to Italy, the purpose of which was to discuss the possibility of the marriage of Violante Visconti, daughter of Galeazzo II Visconti, Lord of Milan, with either Lionel or his younger brother Edmund of Langley. Quite quickly, the Duke of Clarence became the preferred candidate for marriage. The initiator of Violante's marriage project was her uncle, Bernabò Visconti, who was ready to pay dearly for a prestigious alliance with the Plantagenets. Moreover, according to historian Mark Ormrod, the marriage complemented the anti-papal stance pursued by the English crown in the 1360s. In his opinion, only this can explain what advantages the English king planned to receive from an alliance with Milan, since Edward III's dynastic strategy was largely aimed at the British Isles and France.

The marriage contract was signed at the Palace of Westminster in May 1367. In February 1368, the Duke of Clarence, having married his 13-year-old daughter Philippa to the 16-year-old Edmund Mortimer, 3rd Earl of March, sailed for Italy. He was accompanied by a retinue of 457 people, who took with them at least 1,280 horses. The wedding ceremony itself took place on 28 May or 5 June in front of Cathedral of Santa Maria Maggiore (where later the Milan Cathedral was built). There is evidence that the elderly poet Petrarch took part in the wedding dinner during the luxurious celebrations that followed the wedding ceremony, which was distinguished by great pomp, sitting among the greatest guests at the first table. In the next 5 months there were continuous celebrations, feasts and tournaments.

Violante's dowry was the enormous amount of 2 million golden florins, together with the fiefdoms of Alba, Mondovì, Cuneo, Cherasco, and Demonte. English chroniclers, reporting the incredible success of Edward III's marriage policy, believed that Galeazzo II Visconti transferred half of his lands to his son-in-law. However, the marriage turned out to be short and fruitless: at the beginning of October 1368, Lionel fell ill with an unknown illness and died on 17 October in the city of Alba in Piedmont. Suspicions soon arose that he was poisoned by his father-in-law, although this was never proven. The 19th-century historian Thomas Frederick Tout points out that Galeazzo II had no motive to kill his son-in-law, whose death led to the collapse of his ambitions.

Lionel was initially buried in Pavia, but in his will written at Alba, dated 3 October 1368 and confirmed at Lambeth on 8 June 1369, he expressed a desire to be buried in Clare Priory. As a result, his body was later transported to England and buried next to his first wife.

=== Legacy ===
Unlike his brothers Edward the Black Prince, John of Gaunt and Thomas of Woodstock, Lionel did not play a particularly significant role in English political life. He rarely came to the attention of contemporary chroniclers. Mark Ormrod believes that perhaps Lionel, like his younger brother, Edmund of Langley, was not drawn to the world of high politics. However, it is possible that the fact that his career took place mainly outside England played a role —first in Ireland, then in Italy. His early death shortly before his 30th birthday deprived his English contemporaries of any real knowledge about the personality of the prince and his merits.

Lionel's only child, Philippa, 5th Countess of Ulster, married Edmund Mortimer, 3rd Earl of March, in 1368. They had four children, Lady Elizabeth Mortimer (1371–1417), Roger Mortimer, 4th Earl of March (1374–1398), Lady Philippa Mortimer (1375–1400) and Edmund Mortimer (1376–1409). Their granddaughter and eventual heiress, Anne Mortimer, married Richard of Conisburgh (younger brother of Edward, 2nd Duke of York) and was the mother of Richard, 3rd Duke of York. Even though Richard of York was a descendant in the male line of Edward III from Edmund of Langley, Lionel's younger brother, the House of York based its claim to the English throne on descent through the female line from Lionel. In doing so, the Yorkists were able to present a senior claim to the English throne over the House of Lancaster, the descendants of another younger brother, John of Gaunt. (Edward III's first-born son, Edward the Black Prince, had no legitimate descendants past his two sons Edward of Angoulême and King Richard II.) Lionel was the ancestor of Kings Edward IV, Edward V, Richard III and all later English, and subsequently British, monarchs except for Henry VII, whose wife Elizabeth of York was Lionel's descendant.

Thanks to Lionel's dynastic connection with the House of York, the English chronicler John Hardyng not only came up with an idealized description of the duke's appearance, reporting that the prince was a man of great strength and beauty and had a tall stature —reportedly as nearly seven feet (210 cm)—, but also suggested that marriage to a member of the House of Visconti could eventually make him King of Italy and even Holy Roman Emperor.

== Arms ==
One reputed version of Lionel's coat of arms

Lionel's arms were at some point those of the kingdom, differenced by a label argent of five points, with each point bearing a cross gules, thus presenting the flag of England's Saint George's cross on each point. There are also suggestions, such as the above image, that at some point he bore a differentiating label argent of three points, each bearing a canton gules.

== Bibliography ==
- Ormrod, W. M. (January 2008a) [2004]. "Edward III (1312–1377)". Oxford Dictionary of National Biography (online ed.). Oxford University Press. doi:10.1093/ref:odnb/8519. (Subscription, Wikipedia Library access or UK public library membership required.)
- Ormrod, W. M. (January 2008b) [2004]. "Lionel, duke of Clarence (1338–1368)". Oxford Dictionary of National Biography (online ed.). Oxford University Press. doi:10.1093/ref:odnb/16750. (Subscription, Wikipedia Library access or UK public library membership required.)
- Jones, Dan (2021). Alpina Publisher (Russian translation) (ed.). The Plantagenets: The Kings Who Made England. Moscow. p. 686. ISBN 978-0-00-721392-4.
- Ustinov, Vadim (2007). The Hundred Years' War and the Wars of the Roses (in Russian). Moscow: AST: Astrel. p. 637. ISBN 978-5-17-042765-9.
- Panton, James (2011). Historical Dictionary of the British Monarchy. Metuchen, NJ: Rowman & Littlefield: Scarecrow Press. p. 722. ISBN 978-0-81-087497-8.

=== Attribution ===
Lionel of Antwerp House of Plantagenet Born: 29 November 1338 Died: 17 October 1368
Peerage of Ireland
Preceded by William Donn de Burgh	Earl of Ulster jure uxoris by Elizabeth de Burgh; 1347–1368	Succeeded by Philippa Plantagenet
