= Edmund Mortimer, 3rd Earl of March =

English magnate (1352–1381)

Edmund Mortimer
- 3rd Earl of March; Earl of Ulster
- Arms of Mortimer: Barry or and azure, on a chief of the first two pallets between two gyrons of the second over all an inescutcheon argent
- Born: 1 February 1352; Llangoed in Llyswen, Brecknockshire, Wales
- Died: 27 December 1381 (aged 29); Cork, Ireland
- Noble family: Mortimer
- Spouse: Philippa Plantagenet (m. 1369; d. 1381)
- Issue more...: Elizabeth Mortimer; Roger Mortimer, 4th Earl of March; Sir Edmund Mortimer; Lady Philippa Mortimer
- Father: Roger Mortimer, 2nd Earl of March
- Mother: Philippa Montagu

Edmund Mortimer, 3rd Earl of March and Earl of Ulster (1 February 1352 – 27 December 1381) was an English magnate who was appointed Lieutenant of Ireland, but died after only two years in the post.

== Early life ==
He was the son of Roger Mortimer, 2nd Earl of March, and his wife Philippa, daughter of William Montagu, 1st Earl of Salisbury, and his wife Catherine Grandison.

An infant at the death of his father, Edmund, as a ward of the crown, was placed by Edward III of England under the care of William of Wykeham and Richard FitzAlan, 10th Earl of Arundel. The position of the young earl, powerful on account of his possessions and hereditary influence in the Welsh marches, was rendered still more important by his marriage on 24 August 1369 at the age of 17 to the 14-year-old Philippa, the only child of the late Lionel of Antwerp, Duke of Clarence, the second son of Edward III.

Lionel's late wife, Elizabeth, had been the daughter and heiress of William Donn de Burgh, 3rd Earl of Ulster, and Lionel had himself been created Earl of Ulster before his marriage. Edmund inherited the title Earl of Ulster on Lionel's death. Therefore, the Earl of March not only represented one of the chief Anglo-Norman lordships in Ireland in right of his wife Philippa, but Philippa's line was also the second most senior line of descent in the succession to the crown, after Edward the Black Prince and his son, King Richard II of England. John of Gaunt, younger brother of Prince Edward, had become the 1st Duke of Lancaster and thus the source of the House of Lancaster's claim to the throne.

This marriage had, therefore, far-reaching consequences in English history, ultimately giving rise to the claim of the House of York to the crown of England contested in the Wars of the Roses between the Yorks and the Lancasters; Edward IV being descended from the second adult son of Edward III as the great-great-grandson of Philippa, countess of March, and in the male line from Edmund of Langley, the first Duke of York and the fourth adult son of Edward III. Edmund Mortimer's son Roger Mortimer, 4th Earl of March, would become heir presumptive to the English crown during the reign of Richard II.

== Political advancement ==
Mortimer, now styled Earl of March and Ulster, became Marshal of England in 1369, and was employed in various diplomatic missions during the next following years. He was a member of the committee appointed by the Peers to confer with the Commons in 1373 – the first instance of such a joint conference since the institution of representative parliaments on the question of granting supplies for John of Gaunt's war in France.

He participated in the opposition to Edward III and the court party, which grew in strength towards the end of the reign, taking the popular side and being prominent in the Good Parliament of 1376 among the lords who supported the Prince of Wales and opposed the Court Party and John of Gaunt. The Speaker of the House of Commons in this parliament was March's steward, Peter de la Mare, (1294-1387 of Little Hereford, Hereford), who firmly withstood John of Gaunt in stating the grievances of the Commons, in supporting the impeachment of several high court officials, and in procuring the banishment of the king's mistress, Alice Perrers. March was a member of the administrative council appointed by the same parliament after the death of Edward the Black Prince to attend the king and advise him in all public affairs.

Following the end of the Good Parliament, its acts were reversed by John of Gaunt, March's steward was jailed, and March himself was ordered to inspect Calais and other remote royal castles as part of his duty as Marshal of England. March chose instead to resign from the post.

=== Sent to govern Ireland ===
On the accession of Richard II, a minor, in 1377, the Earl became a member of the standing council of government; though as the husband of the heir-presumptive to the crown he wisely refrained from claiming any actual administrative office. The richest and most powerful person in the realm was, however, the king's uncle John of Gaunt, whose jealousy led March to accept the office of Lord Lieutenant of Ireland in 1379.

March succeeded in asserting his authority in eastern Ulster, but failed to subdue the O'Neills farther west. Proceeding to Munster to put down the turbulent southern chieftains, March was killed at Cork on 27 December 1381. He was buried in Wigmore Abbey, of which he had been a benefactor, and where his wife Philippa was also interred.

== Children ==
The earl had two sons and two daughters:

- Elizabeth (1371–1417), married Henry "Hotspur" Percy, son of the Earl of Northumberland, and had issue. She later married Thomas de Camoys, 1st Baron Camoys and had issue.
- Roger (1374–1398), succeeded him as 4th Earl of March and Ulster; married Alianore Holland and had issue.
- Edmund (1376–1409), married Catrin ferch Owain Glyndŵr and had issue.
- Philippa (1375–1401), married firstly John Hastings, 3rd Earl of Pembroke; after his death in 1389 she became the second wife of Richard FitzAlan, 11th Earl of Arundel; she married thirdly Sir Thomas Poynings, 5th Baron St John of Basing.

== Ancestry ==
Ancestors of Edmund Mortimer, 3rd Earl of March

Roger Mortimer, 1st Earl of March
Sir Edmund Mortimer
Joan de Geneville, 2nd Baroness Geneville
Roger Mortimer, 2nd Earl of March
Bartholomew de Badlesmere, 1st Baron Badlesmere
Elizabeth de Badlesmere, Countess of Northampton
Margaret de Clare, Lady Badlesmere
Edmund Mortimer, 3rd Earl of March
William Montagu, 2nd Baron Montagu
William Montagu, 1st Earl of Salisbury
Elizabeth Montfort
Philippa Montacute
William de Grandison, 1st Baron Grandison
Catherine Montagu, Countess of Salisbury
Sibylla de Tregoz

== Notes ==
Peerage of England
Preceded by Roger Mortimer	Earl of March; 1360–1381	Succeeded by Roger Mortimer
Preceded by Philippa Plantagenet as sole holder	Earl of Ulster jure uxoris by Philippa Plantagenet; 1369–1381	Succeeded by Roger Mortimer
