= Dahlgren Chapel =

Dahlgren Chapel may refer to:

- Dahlgren Chapel of the Sacred Heart, the primary Catholic chapel on the main campus of Georgetown University
- Dahlgren Chapel (Maryland), a stone chapel in western Maryland built by the Dahlgren family

== See also ==
- Dahlgren (surname)
- Dahlgren (disambiguation)
