= Dahlgren =

Dahlgren may refer to:

== Places ==
- Dahlgren, Illinois
- Dahlgren, Virginia
  - Naval Surface Warfare Center Dahlgren Division
- Dahlgren Township, Carver County, Minnesota
- Dahlgren Township, Hamilton County, Illinois
- Dahlgrens Corner, Virginia
- Dahlgren Chapel (Maryland)
- Dahlgren Chapel of the Sacred Heart, at Georgetown University
- Dahlgren Hall at the U.S. Naval Academy in Annapolis, Maryland
- Dahlgren Railroad Heritage Trail in King George County, Virginia
- Lake Dahlgren, small lake situated southeast of Noble, Oklahoma
- Dahlgren River, river of Minnesota

== Other uses ==
- Dahlgren (surname), a Swedish surname
- Dahlgren gun, type of smooth bore cannon designed by the Admiral and used by the U.S. Navy
- Dahlgren Affair, failed mission to assassinate leaders of the Confederacy
- Dahlgren system and dahlgrenogram, created by Swedish-Danish botanist Rolf M. T. Dahlgren (1932–1987)
- USS Dahlgren (TB-9), Torpedo Boat No. 9/TB-9/Coast Torpedo Boat No. 4
- 6945 Dahlgren (1980 FZ3), Main-belt Asteroid discovered on March 16, 1980 by Lagerkvist, C.-I. at La Silla
- Dahlgren Chapel (disambiguation)
- Dahlgren (fireboat), operated in Annapolis, Maryland, built by MetalCraft Marine

== See also ==
- Dhalgren, a science fiction novel by Samuel R. Delany
