= John Dahlgren =

John Dahlgren may refer to:

- John A. Dahlgren, United States Navy officer
- John Olof Dahlgren, United States Marine Corps corporal and Medal of Honor recipient
- John Vinton Dahlgren, American lawyer
