= Romaine Vinton Goddard, Baroness von Overbeck =

The Baroness von Overbeck The Maharani of Sabah
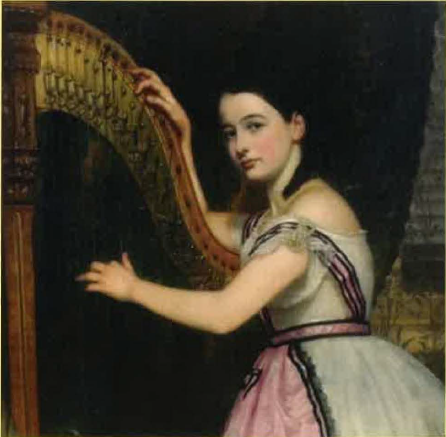
- Portrait of Goddard at age 14 by G. P. A. Healy
- Born: Romaine Vinton Goddard; 1848; Ohio
- Died: March 22, 1926 (aged 77–78)
- Education: Mount de Chantal Visitation Academy
- Spouse: Gustav Overbeck (m. 1870; died 1894)
- Children: 3
- Parent(s): Daniel Convers Goddard; Madeleine Vinton
- Relatives: John A. Dahlgren (step-father)

Romaine Vinton Goddard, Baroness von Overbeck (1848 – March 22, 1926) was an American woman who married the German diplomat Gustav von Overbeck. She was the first American woman to become a maharani, of the territory of Sabah in present-day Malaysia.

== Early life ==
Romaine Vinton Goddard was born in Ohio, one of two children of Daniel Convers Goddard, deputy secretary of the Interior, and poet and novelist Madeleine Vinton. Goddard died when his daughter was three years old and his widow and her two children moved to Washington, D.C. In 1865, Madeleine Goddard married Admiral John A. Dahlgren.

Goddard attended the Mount de Chantal Visitation Academy, a Catholic girls' school in Wheeling, West Virginia, from 1857 to 1859. She was their first student to specialize in the harp and graduated with honors in both harp and piano. In 1862, George Peter Alexander Healy painted her portrait playing the harp.

== Personal life ==
On March 16, 1870, Goddard married Gustav von Overbeck (1830–1894), a German diplomat. Despite a winter storm, the wedding was a leading social event in Washington, with guests including US President Ulysses S. Grant. Together, they had three children:

- Baron Gustav Convers von Overbeck (b. 1871)
- Baron Oscar Karl Maria von Overbeck (b. 1873)
- Baron Alfred von Overbeck (1877–1945)

Initially the couple lived in Germany, but while Overbeck was doing business in Asia, she was left to her own devices, living in Europe or Washington, DC. She assumed the title Baroness when her husband was made a Baron in 1873, and the title maharani in 1877 when her husband was made Maharajah of Sabah, Rajah of Gaya and Sandakan by Abdul Momin, the Sultan of Brunei. Eventually they separated, but never divorced. Little is known about her husband's life in the years following the estrangement. He died at the age of 64 in London.

Relying financially on the income from a family trust invested in coal mines, she later lived apart from her husband in Baden-Baden and Berlin. Her children and other descendants of her grandfather Samuel Finley Vinton engaged in a decades long legal battle (Von Overbeck v. Dahlgren) over his substantial estate, which lasted from his death in 1862 until 1928.

=== Relationship with Hans von Bülow ===
In December 1875, she was presented by Kurd von Schlözer at a reception at the Germany embassy in Washington, DC, where she met German pianist Hans von Bülow. They began a brief, tempestuous affair and Bülow fell madly in love with her and wrote her a series of increasingly tortured love letters. The exact nature of their relationship is unknown as only his letters to her are known to exist, and not any responses she may have written. Her mother's novel A Washington Winter (1893) contains a sub-plot which was likely inspired by Bülow’s pursuit of Goddard.
