= Gustav Overbeck =

German businessman, adventurer and diplomat (1830–1894)

Gustav Overbeck (4 March 1830 – 8 April 1894), from 1867 Gustav von Overbeck, from 1873 Freiherr von Overbeck, from 1877 Maharaja of Sabah and Rajah of Gaya and Sandakan, was a German businessman, adventurer and diplomat.

== Early life ==
Overbeck was the son of pharmacist and medical councillor Georg Heinrich Overbeck from Lemgo.

Overbeck came to Bremen for a commercial apprenticeship with his uncle in the family business there, but did not stay long, and emigrated to the United States in the spring of 1850 with his cousin August Meier. He went to San Francisco and opened a business, while undertaking adventurous trade journeys to Hawaii, the South Seas, Alaska, and the Bering Strait.

== Career ==
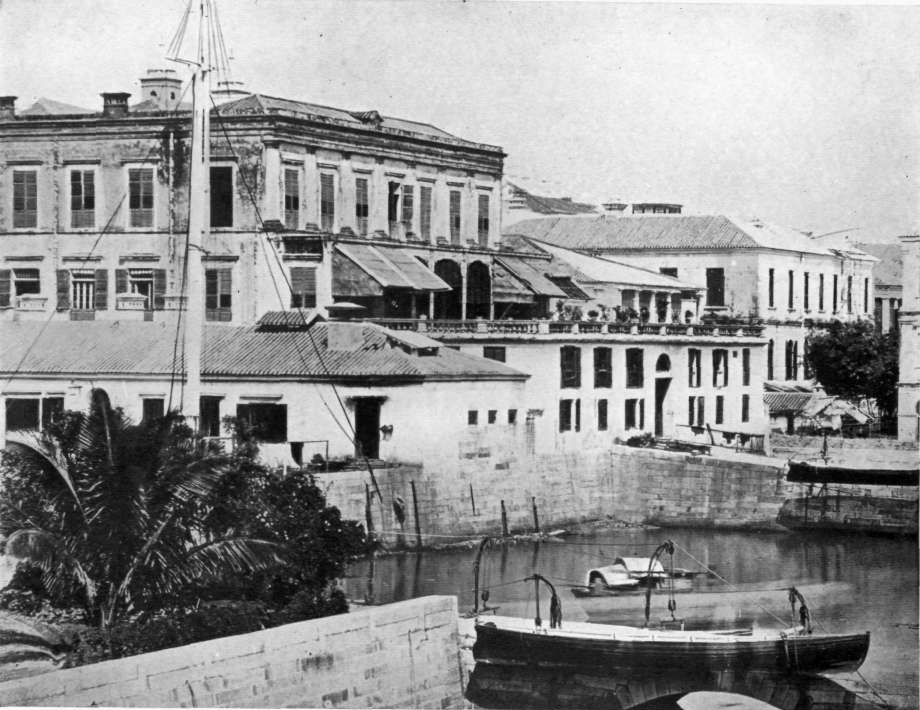
Dent & Co. in British Hong Kong, 1858.

He came into contact with the English trading house Dent & Co., which in 1854 gave him a job in British Hong Kong. In 1856, he was appointed Prussia's Vice Consul before becoming a consul for the Austrian Empire in 1864. Overbeck resigned from his Prussian post in 1866, following the Austro-Prussian War. In 1867, he was elevated to the aristocracy.

=== Life in Borneo ===
Concession of Sabah

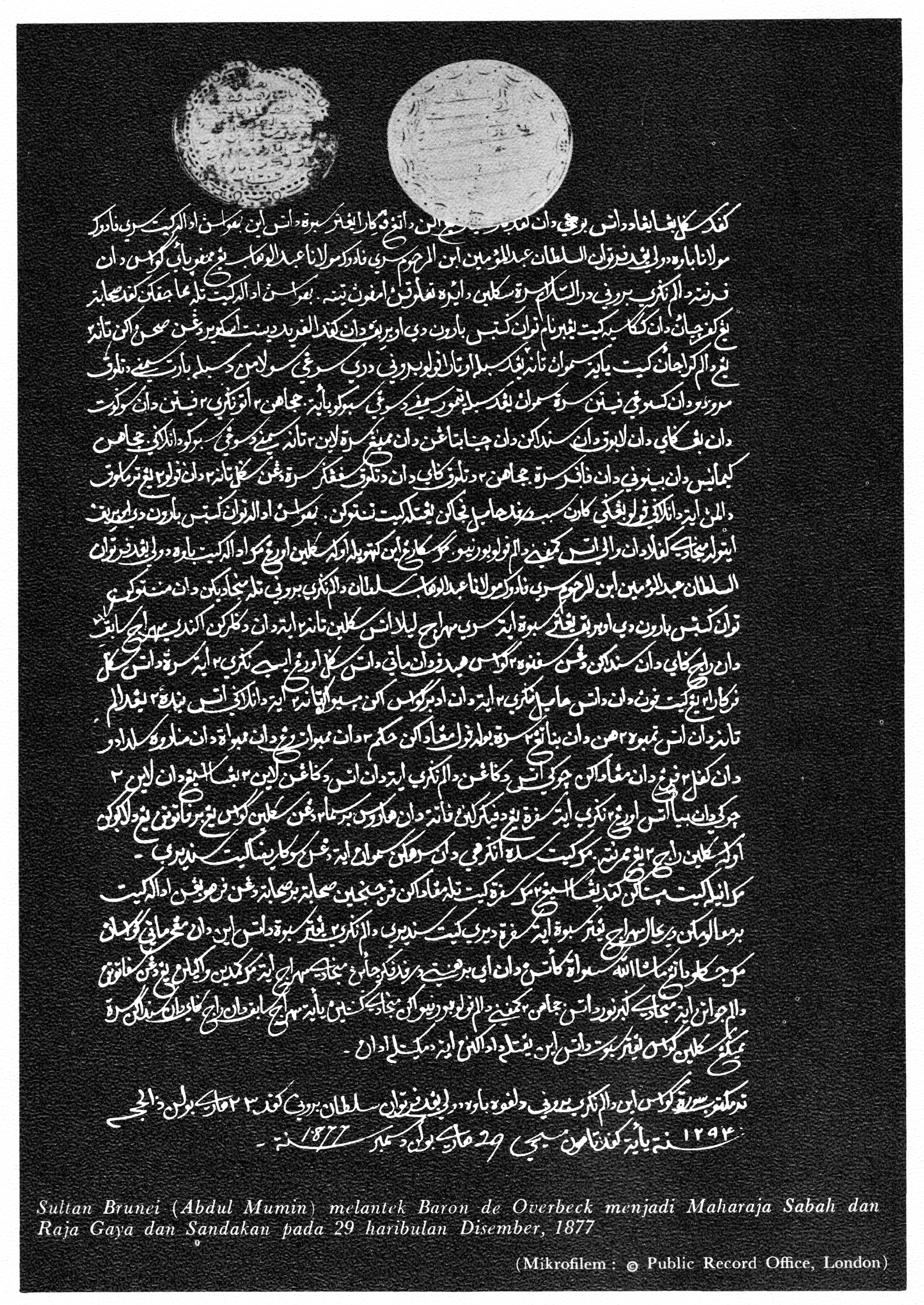
The first concession treaty was signed by Sultan Abdul Momin of Brunei on 29 December 1877

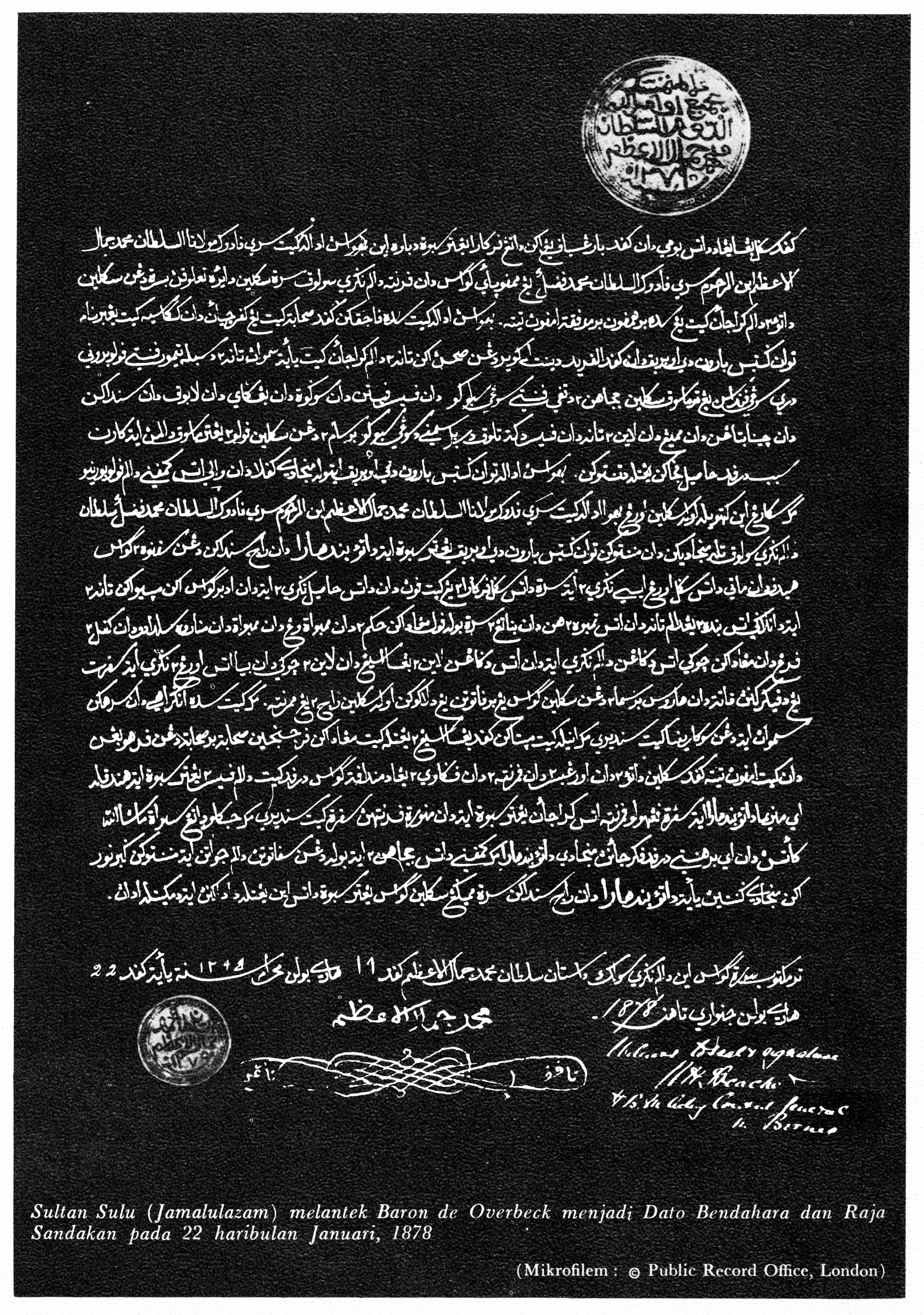
The second concession treaty was signed by Sultan Jamal ul-Azam of Sulu on 22 January 1878

In January 1876, he purchased the concessionary rights of American Trading Company of Borneo to territories in northern Borneo from Joseph William Torrey for $15,000, conditional on the successful renewal of the concessions from local authorities. Overbeck was appointed Maharaja of Sabah and Rajah of Gaya and Sandakan in a 29 December 1877 treaty with Sultan Abdul Momin of Brunei, who still claimed ownership of northern Borneo. That same year, Overbeck founded a joint venture (known as Dent & Overbeck Company/Overbeck & Co.) with the British brothers Alfred and Edward Dent, who acted as financiers.

From November 1877, he undertook an expedition to Borneo with an American steamer for the acquisition of territorial rights and the exploitation of mineral resources in the territory. Following his expedition, he met with the Sultan of Sulu and forged a treaty with Sultan Jamalulazam of Sulu, who titled him Dato Bendahara and Raja Sandakan on 22 January 1878. The far-reaching concession attracted great attention in Europe and the United States; The Washington Post described it as the most important transfer obtained by a commercial company since the days of the British East India Company.

However, on 22 July 1878, Spanish forces operating from the Philippines forced the Sultan of Sulu to surrender, causing Overbeck to lose his title and territory in the north-eastern areas he had gained from the Sultan. Overbeck then returned to Europe from 1879 to 1880 to seek support for an enforcement of the concession agreement and to promote the territory to the German Empire, Austria-Hungary and the Kingdom of Italy. As the United Kingdom had a strong interest in Borneo, Overbeck managed to gain support from them; meanwhile, in Germany, only Alexander Georg Mosle supported his bid to acquire the territory for the German Empire.

At the beginning of 1881, the British North Borneo Provisional Association Limited was established after Overbeck transferred its rights to the Dent brothers. Within a year, the company succeeded in pushing back the Spanish claim, establishing the territory as a British protectorate known as North Borneo. To this day, the interpretation of the Jawi concession documents of 1877–78 plays a role in the international dispute between Malaysia and the Philippines regarding territorial claims in northern Borneo (modern Sabah).

== Personal life ==
While in British Hong Kong, he had four children with a Chinese woman named Lam Tsat-Tai. They were Lily Overbeck, Oi Moon Overbeck, Annie Overbeck and Victoria Overbeck.

On 16 March 1870, Overbeck married Romaine Madeleine Goddard (1848–1926). Her father was Daniel Convers Goddard (1822–1852), the first Assistant Secretary in the United States Department of the Interior; her mother Madeleine Vinton Dahlgren (1825–1898), daughter of the Congressman Samuel F. Vinton, was a well known author who married Admiral John A. Dahlgren in 1865 (her second marriage). The wedding of Overbeck and Romaine Goddard on 16 March 1870 was a social event in Washington, D.C., attended by President Ulysses S. Grant, his wife Julia Grant, Chief Justice Salmon P. Chase, and numerous ambassadors.

The couple had three sons: Baron Gustav Convers von Overbeck, Baron Oscar Karl Maria von Overbeck and Baron Alfred von Overbeck (1877–1945). Romaine was an excellent pianist and often stayed with her family in Washington during her husband's journeys; In December 1875, she was presented by Kurd von Schlözer at the German Embassy in Washington, and began a brief, tempestuous affair with Hans von Bülow. Relying financially on the income from a family trust invested in coal mines, she later lived apart from her husband in Baden-Baden and Berlin. Little is known about Overbeck's life in the years following the estrangement. Overbeck died at the age of 64 in London.

== Honours ==
- 1862: Prussian Order of the Crown, 4th Class
- 1864: Order of the Iron Crown 3rd Class
- 1867: Commander's Cross of the Order of Franz Joseph

== Literature ==
- Florian Lueke: Konsul, Kaufmann, Maharadscha. Zur Erinnerung an Gustav Freiherr von Overbeck (1830-1894). In: Lippische Mitteilungen aus Geschichte und Landeskunde in German 90 (2021) 233-255.
- Rainer Pape: Gustav Freiherr von Overbeck (1830–1894). Eine biographische Skizze, in: Lippische Mitteilungen aus Geschichte und Landeskultur (in German) 28 (1959) 163–217
- Volker Schult (2008). Wunsch und Wirklichkeit: deutsch-philippinische Beziehungen im Kontext globaler Verflechtungen 1860-1945 (in German). Logos Verlag Berlin GmbH. pp. 51–53. ISBN 978-3-8325-1898-1.

Hutto, Richard Jay, The Kaiser's Confidante: Mary Lee, the First American-born Princess, MacFarland & Co., 2017; pp. 129-134.
