= Henry Symes Lehr =

American socialite (1869–1929)

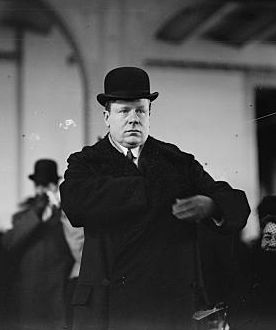
- Lehr in 1908
- Born: March 28, 1869; Baltimore, Maryland, U.S.
- Died: January 3, 1929 (aged 59); Baltimore, Maryland, U.S.
- Resting place: Green Mount Cemetery
- Other name: King Lehr
- Spouse: Elizabeth Wharton Drexel (m. 1901)

Henry Symes Lehr (March 28, 1869 – January 3, 1929) was an American socialite during the Gilded Age who was dubbed "America's Court Jester".

== Early life ==
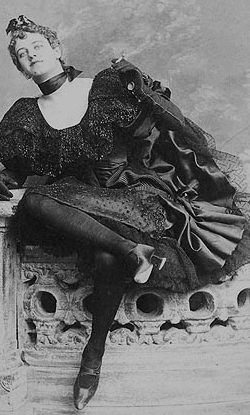
Lehr in drag for an amateur theatrical performance

Lehr was born on March 28, 1869, in Baltimore, Maryland, the fourth child in a family of seven born to Mary Frances Moore Lehr, and Robert Oliver Lehr, a tobacco and snuff importer who became the German consul in Baltimore and a governor of the Maryland Club. His sister was Alice Lehr Morton and his brother was Dr. Louis Lehr, who was a physician.

== Society life ==
He attempted to establish himself as successor to Ward McAllister, arbiter elegantiarum of New York's Four Hundred, the collection of Knickerbocker and industrial families he created as a bulwark against the new wealth of the Gilded Age. He was known for staging elaborate parties alongside Marion "Mamie" Fish, such as the so-called "dog's dinner", in which 100 pets of wealthy friends dined at foot-high tables while dressed in formal attire At a later party, he impersonated the Czar of Russia, and was henceforth dubbed "King Lehr".

== Personal life ==
In 1900, Lehr was introduced to recently widowed 32-year-old heiress Elizabeth "Bessie" Wharton Drexel Dahlgren. the widow of John Vinton Dahlgren and daughter of the late Philadelphia banker Joseph William Drexel, by Edith Gould, the wife of George Jay Gould. Edith told Bessie that he had "hardly any money, but he goes everywhere," and that it was "impossible to have a party without him." Gould also told her that the men didn't like him, and called him "one of 'the little brothers of the rich,' but that's just because they are jealous of his popularity." They saw each other often and in March, Lehr took her to Sherry's where he introduced her to Caroline Schermerhorn Astor (married to William Backhouse Astor Jr.), Marion Graves Anthon Fish (married to Stuyvesant Fish), Theresa Fair Oelrichs (married to Hermann Oelrichs), and Alva Belmont (who was divorced from William Kissam Vanderbilt and married to Oliver Belmont). After meeting the society doyennes approval, Lehr proposed to Bessie on the way home.

Lehr and Bessie were married at St Patrick's Cathedral in New York in 1901. After the wedding, they traveled to the Stafford Hotel in Baltimore, where Lehr refused to sleep with her on their wedding night, stating:

In public I will be to you everything that a most devoted husband should be to his wife. You shall never complain of my conduct in this respect. I will give you courtesy, respect and apparently devotion. But you must expect nothing more from me. When we are alone I do not intend to keep up the miserable pretense, the farce of love and sentiment. Our marriage will never be a marriage in anything but in name. I do not love you. I can never love you. I can school myself to be polite to you but that is all. The less we see of one another except in the presence of others, the better.

They stayed in a loveless, unconsummated marriage for 28 years, as Lehr benefited from her wealth, she from his social connections and her strong wish to not upset her conservative, staunchly Catholic mother, Lucy (née Wharton) Drexel.

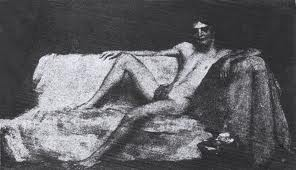
Harper Pennington's portrait of Robert Gould Shaw II as "Little Billee" from the novel Trilby, a painting said to have been owned by Lehr and hung in his bedroom

He was diagnosed in 1923, the year he suffered "a general breakdown" while in Paris, and had a brain tumor removed in 1927. He died on January 3, 1929, of a brain malady at Johns Hopkins Hospital in Baltimore. At the time of his death, Bessie was in France staying at the home of Alva's daughter Consuelo Vanderbilt and her husband Jacques Balsan (after her divorce from Charles Spencer-Churchill, 9th Duke of Marlborough). His funeral was held at St. Ignatius Church in Baltimore and he was buried in the family lot in Green Mount Cemetery. Under the terms of his will, he left all of his property in the United States to his sisters and his possessions in Paris to his widow.

=== Sexuality ===
Lehr was, in fact, gay and rumored to have had a longstanding relationship with friend and fellow Newport cottager Charles Greenough. Lehr owned, and hung in his bedroom, a nude painting by R. G. Harper Pennington of Robert Gould Shaw II as the character "Little Billee" from the bohemian novel Trilby (1894) by George du Maurier.

In 1904, three years after his marriage, Lehr objected to his name being used in a song from the musical comedy Baroness Fiddlesticks.

Seeing New York,
Seeing New York,
Flatiron and Subway and all—
Where the Bowery crowd goes
In their glad evening clo’es
To Harry Lehr's annual ball.

The lyrics of the stanza he objected to, above, implied a connection between Lehr and the “Bowery” crowd” which, as historian George Chauncey has established “was the center of the city’s best-known sites of homosexual rendezvous at the turn of the century [as well as] other ‘commercialized vice.’”

== In popular culture ==
- Lehr appears as a supporting character in Gore Vidal's 1987 novel Empire.
