= USS Dahlgren =

Three ships in the United States Navy have been named USS Dahlgren for John A. Dahlgren.

- USS Dahlgren (TB-9), was a torpedo boat, commissioned in 1900 and decommissioned in 1919.
- USS Dahlgren (DD-187), was a Clemson-class destroyer commissioned in 1920, served in World War II and decommissioned in 1945.
- USS Dahlgren (DDG-43), was a Farragut-class guided missile destroyer, commissioned in 1961 and decommissioned in 1992.
