= John Vinton Dahlgren =

American lawyer (1868-1899)

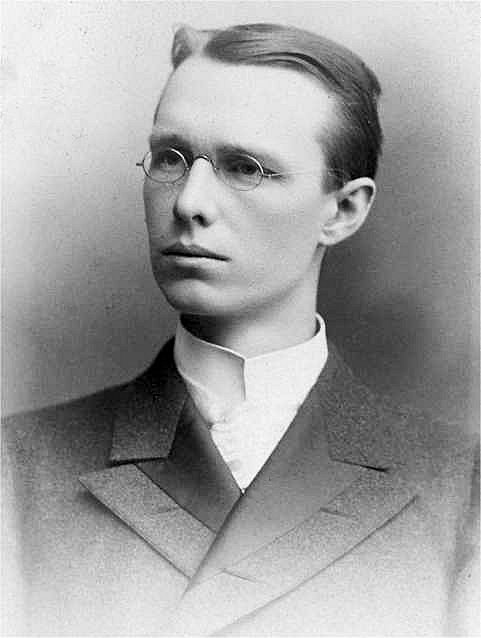
- Dahlgren in 1889
- Born: April 22, 1868; Valparaíso, Chile
- Died: August 11, 1899 (aged 31); Colorado Springs, Colorado, U.S.
- Spouse: Elizabeth Wharton Drexel (1889)
- Children: John Vinton Dahlgren II (1892–1964); Joseph Drexel Dahlgren (1890–1891)
- Parent(s): John Adolphus Bernard Dahlgren (1809–1870); Sarah Madeleine Vinton (1825–1898)

John Vinton Dahlgren (April 22, 1868 – August 11, 1899) was an American lawyer, Commissioner of Charities for the State of New York and the first husband of Elizabeth Wharton Drexel. The medical library building at Georgetown University is named in his honor.

== Early life and education ==
Dahlgren was born in Valparaíso, Chile, the son of Admiral John A. Dahlgren and Sarah Madeleine Vinton, daughter of Congressman Samuel Finley Vinton. General William Tecumseh Sherman and wife Ellen were his godparents. Dahlgren's early education was in Washington, D.C. He attended Georgetown University, graduating with a B.A. 1889; M.A. 1891; L.L.B. 1891; L.L.M. 1892. He was the class valedictorian in 1889.

== Career ==
In 1892 Dahlgren was admitted to practice law in the District of Columbia. Shortly thereafter he moved to New York City where he was admitted to the Bar in 1894. After a short professional law practice with the firm Lord, Day and Lord, Dahlgren accepted an appointment as the attorney for the New York City Buildings Department in December 1895. During his time he published the book Dahlgren's Building Law Manual (1897). In December 1896, Dahlgren resigned his position in the Buildings Department due to his failing eyesight. In early 1896 Dahlgren became president of New York and Pennsylvania Brick, Tile, and Terra Cotta Company. On March 25, 1898, New York Governor Black appointed him Commissioner of Charities.

== Personal life ==
On June 29, 1889, Dahlgren married Elizabeth Wharton Drexel in Saint Patrick's Cathedral, New York City. According to The New York Times, the wedding was a "notable social event". The newlyweds entertained quite a bit with guests including Cardinal Corrigan and many members of New York society. In March 1890 their first son Joseph Drexel Dahlgren (1890–1891) was born. Their second son, John Vinton Dahlgren, Jr. was born June 30, 1892, in Washington, D.C. During their marriage, they made numerous donations to Roman Catholic charities and to Georgetown University, including funds for the construction of Dahlgren Chapel of the Sacred Heart, as a memorial for their first son who died in infancy. They were married until Dahlgren's death in 1899.

== Death ==
In the spring of 1899 Dahlgren was taken ill with tuberculosis and went to Colorado Springs, Colorado to recuperate from his illness. After several months, his condition worsened and he died on August 11, 1899. Dahlgren's funeral was held on August 18, 1899, in Washington, D.C. at Georgetown University's Dahlgren Chapel, which had been constructed six years earlier as a memorial to the death of Dahlgren's infant son, Joseph. At his interment he joined his son in the family crypt beneath the chapel's altar.

== Dahlgren Memorial Library ==
In January 1971, Georgetown University Medical Center finished construction of a new building for its medical library. The building was dedicated the John Vinton Dahlgren Memorial Library.

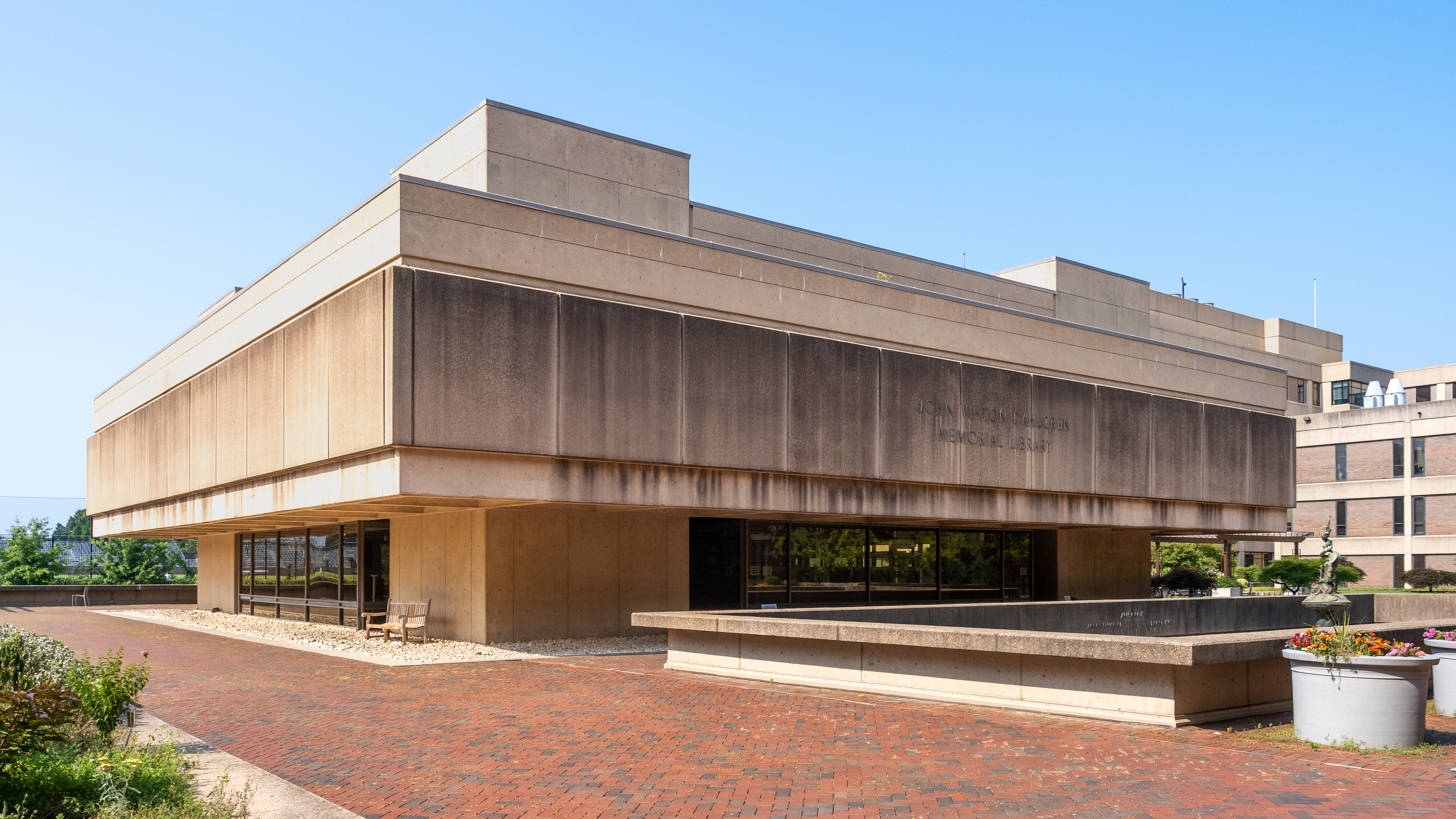
(2024)
