= Madeleine Vinton Dahlgren =

American poet, writer, and translator

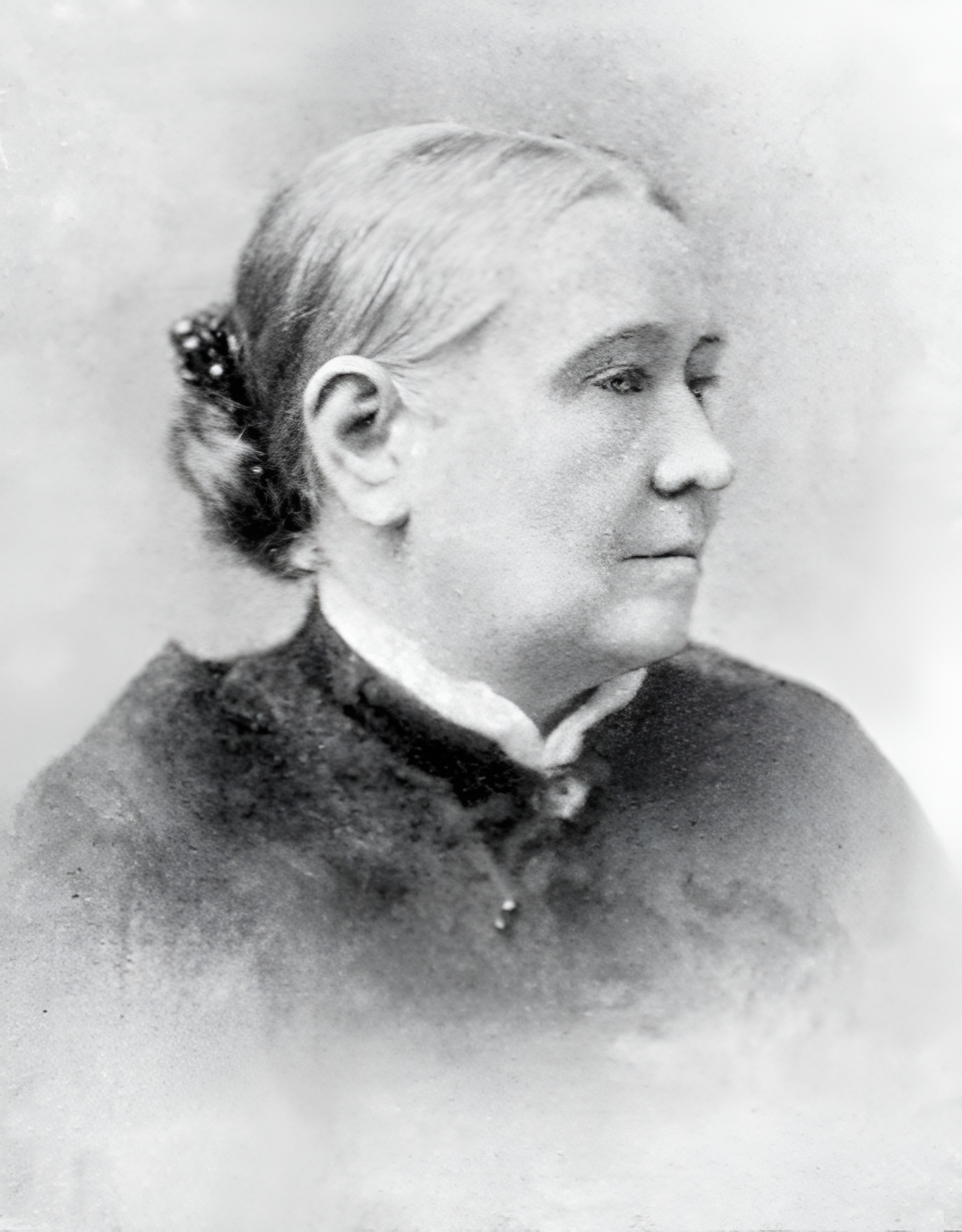
- "A Woman of the Century"
- Born: Sarah Madeleine Vinton; July 13, 1825; Gallipolis, Ohio, U.S.
- Died: May 28, 1898 (aged 72); Washington, D.C., U.S.
- Resting place: Saint Michael's Catholic Church Cemetery, Poplar Springs, Maryland, U.S.
- Education: Georgetown Visitation Preparatory School
- Occupations: Poet; Writer; Translator; Anti-suffragist
- Spouses: Daniel Convers Goddard (m. 1846, 1849); John A. Dahlgren (m. 1865, 1870)
- Children: John Vinton Dahlgren
- Parent: Samuel Finley Vinton (father)
- Writing career
- Pen name: Corinne; Cornelia
- Language: English

Madeleine Vinton Dahlgren (pen names, Corinne and Cornelia; July 13, 1825 – May 28, 1898) was an American writer, translator, and anti-suffragist. Her volume, Idealities (Philadelphia, 1859) was her first work in book form. Thereafter, she found time to write upon a great variety of subjects. She made several translations from the French, Spanish and Italian languages, notably Charles Forbes René de Montalembert's brochure, "Pius IX," the abstruse philosophical work of Juan Donoso Cortés from the Spanish, and the monograph of Adolphe de Chambrun on "The Executive Power" (Lancaster, Pennsylvania, 1874). These translations brought her positive recognitions, among others, a flattering letter from Montalembert. She was the author of a voluminous Biography of Admiral Dahlgren, and a number of novels including South-Mountain Magic (Boston, 1882), A Washington Winter (Boston, 1883), The Lost Name (Boston, 1886), Lights and Shadows of a Life (Boston, 1887), Divorced (New York City, 1887), South Sea Sketches (Boston), and a volume on Etiquette of Social Life in Washington (Philadelphia, 1881), Thoughts on Female Suffrage (Washington, D.C., 1871), and also of a great number of essays, articles, reviews and short stories written for papers and periodicals. Occasionally, Dahlgren expressed herself in verse, and several of her efforts are included in anthologies of poets.

Dahlgren's estate was on South Mountain, Maryland, overlooking the battlefield. In 1870 and 1873, she actively opposed the movement for female suffrage, and drew up a petition to Congress, which was extensively signed, asking that the right to vote should not be extended to women. The Literary Society of Washington, of which she was one of the founders, held its meetings in her house for six years, and she was elected its vice-president. She was for some time president of the Ladies' Catholic Missionary Society of Washington, and built the chapel of St. Joseph's of the Sacred Heart of Jesus, on South Mountain.

== Early years ==
Madeleine Vinton was born in Gallipolis, Ohio on July 13, 1825. She was the only daughter of Samuel Finley Vinton, who served a quarter of a century with much distinction as a Whig leader in Congress, and Romaine Madeleine Bureau. Her mother and brother died when she was six. Dahlgren studied at Charles and Marie Picot's boarding school in Philadelphia and the Georgetown Visitation Preparatory School. Her maternal ancestors were French. As soon as she was of age, Dahlgren served as hostess at her father's home in Washington, D.C.

== Career ==
As early as 1859, Dahlgren contributed to the press prose articles under the signature "Corinne," and later, some fugitive poems. She also wrote under the pen-name "Cornelia". In 1859, her volume, "Idealities," appeared. She made several translations from the French, Spanish and Italian languages, which brought her recognition, among others, an autograph letter from Pope Pius IX, the thanks from the Queen of Spain and a complimentary notice from President James A. Garfield. Her works include the Biography of Admiral Dahlgren and a number of novels, among which are South Mountain Magic A Washington Winter, The Lost Name, Lights and Shadows of a Life, and South Sea Sketches, and a volume on Etiquette of Social Life in Washington. Social questions and the topics of the day especially occupied her attention. Her poems found a place in the anthologies of poets. She was one of the founders and vice-president of the Literary Society of Washington, also one-time president of the Ladies Catholic Missionary Society of Washington.

Dahlgren started the Anti-Sixteenth Amendment Society in 1869, holding the first two meetings at her home.

== Private life ==
In 1846, at an early age, she became the wife of Daniel Convers Goddard, first assistant secretary, U. S. Department of the Interior, who left her a widow with two children: Vinton Augustine and Romaine, who married the Baron de Overbeck of Germany.

In August 1865, she married Admiral John A. Dahlgren, and had three children by that marriage:

- John Vinton Dahlgren, who married Elizabeth Wharton Drexel
- Eric Bernard Dahlgren Sr., who married Lucy Wharton Drexel
- Ulrica Mary Madeleine Dahlgren, who married Josiah Pierce

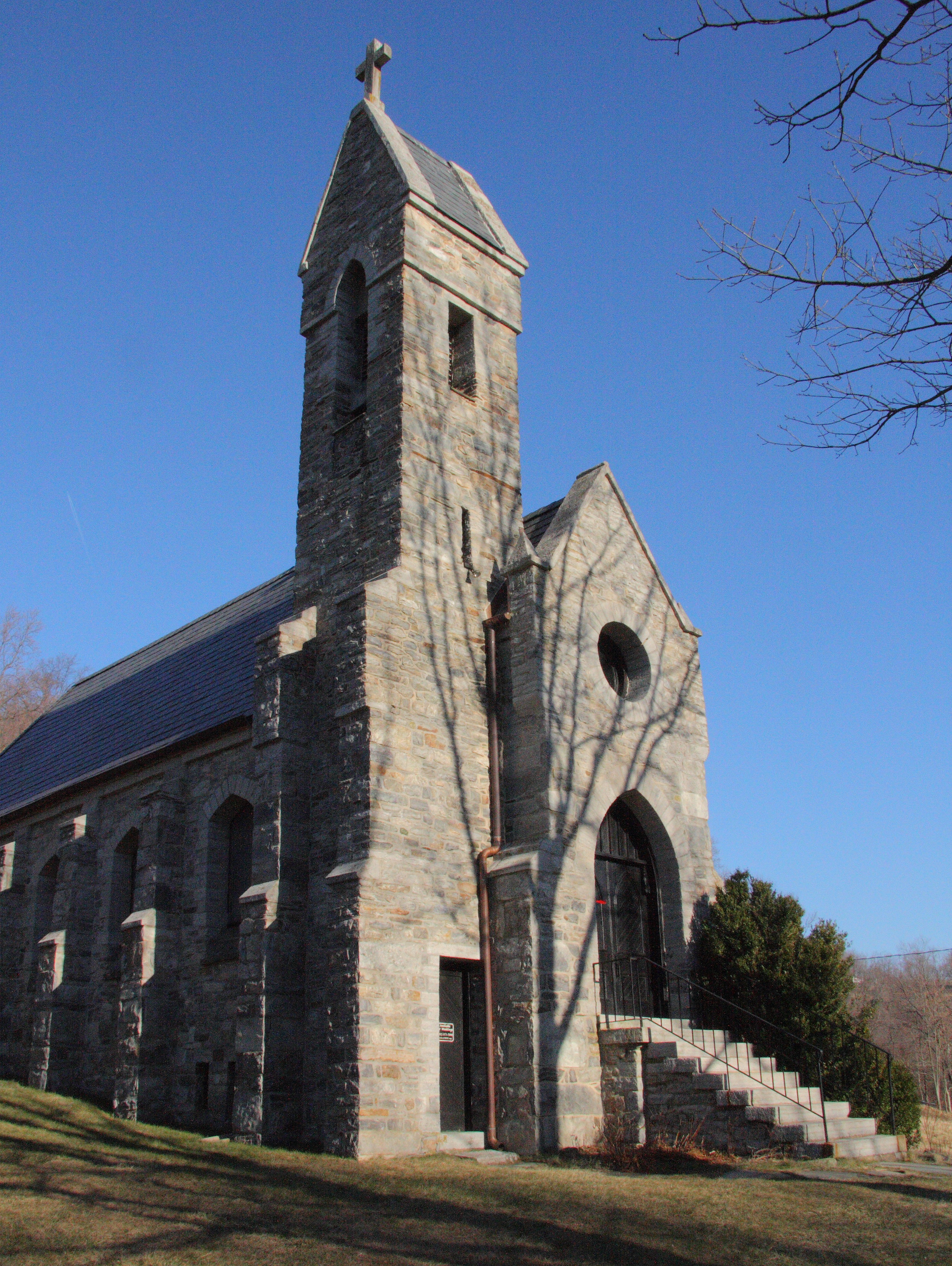
Dahlgren Chapel on South Mountain

Dahlgren built a house on Massachusetts Avenue, living there the rest of her life. Her country seat, Dahlgren, with chapel, was on South Mountain, Maryland, overlooking the battlefield.

She died on May 28, 1898, and is buried at South Mountain.

== Selected works ==
- The Woodley lane ghost, and other stories
- Thoughts on female suffrage : and in vindication of woman's true rights, 1871
- Arguments before the Committee on Privileges and Elections of the United States Senate, in behalf of a sixteenth amendment to the Constitution of the United States, prohibiting the several states from disfranchising United States citizens on account of sex, January 11 and 12, 1878 , 1878
- Democracy, an American novel, 1880
- South Sea sketches. : A narrative, 1881
- South-Mountain Magic, 1882
- A Washington Winter, 1883
- The lost name : a novelette, 1886
- Lights and shadows of a life : a novel, 1887
- The social-official etiquette of the United States, 1894
- The Woodley land ghost, and other stories. , 1898
- Divorced. A novel, 1887
