= Dahlgren (surname) =

Dahlgren is a Swedish surname.

== Geographical distribution ==
As of 2014, 51.5% of all known bearers of the surname Dahlgren were residents of Sweden (frequency 1:1,568), 37.6% of the United States (1:78,773), 2.7% of Finland (1:16,759), 2.3% of Canada (1:130,028), 2.2% of Norway (1:19,260) and 1.5% of Denmark (1:31,711).

In Sweden, the frequency of the surname was higher than national average (1:1,568) in the following counties:

1. Västerbotten County (1:699)
2. Gotland County (1:991)
3. Värmland County (1:1,075)
4. Jämtland County (1:1,145)
5. Halland County (1:1,167)
6. Västra Götaland County (1:1,257)
7. Östergötland County (1:1,314)
8. Västernorrland County (1:1,410)

In Finland, the frequency of the surname was higher than national average (1:16,759) in the following regions:

1. Åland (1:1,700)
2. Ostrobothnia (1:4,345)
3. Central Ostrobothnia (1:4,458)
4. Tavastia Proper (1:6,964)
5. Uusimaa (1:10,597)

== People ==
- Anders Dahlgren (1925–1986), Swedish politician who was a member of the Centre Party
- Charles G. Dahlgren (1811–1888), Confederate brigadier general during the American Civil War
- Dagmar Dahlgren (1880–1951), American singer and silent film era motion picture actress
- Babe Dahlgren (1912–1996), American baseball player
- Edward C. Dahlgren (1916–2006), United States Army soldier
- Eva Dahlgren (born 1960), Swedish singer
- Fredrik August Dahlgren (1816–1895) Swedish writer, playwright and songwriter
- George Dahlgren (1887–1940), player in the National Football League
- Gertrud Dahlgren (1931–2009), Swedish botanist
- Jay Dahlgren (born 1948), Canadian javelin thrower
- Jeff Dahlgren, American guitarist and producer
- Jennifer Dahlgren (born 1984), Argentine hammer thrower
- John A. Dahlgren (1809–1870), Rear Admiral, U.S. Navy officer
- John Olof Dahlgren (1872–1963), American Medal of Honor recipient
- Karl Fredrik Dahlgren (1791–1844), Swedish poet
- Kevin Dahlgren (1992–2018), American convicted of a quadruple murder in the Czech Republic
- Leif Dahlgren (1906–1998), Swedish decathlete
- Madeleine Vinton Dahlgren (1825–1898; pen name, "Corinne"), American writer, translator, anti-suffragist
- Mathias Dahlgren (born 1969), Swedish chef, who won the culinary championship Bocuse d'Or in 1997
- Mikael Dahlgren (born 1984), Swedish footballer who currently plays for Landskrona BoIS
- Robert Dahlgren (born 1979), Swedish auto racing driver
- Rolf Dahlgren (1932–1987), Swedish-Danish botanist
- Ulric Dahlgren (1842–1864), Colonel, U.S. Army officer
