= Anti-Sixteenth Amendment Society =

American 19th century organisation against votes for women

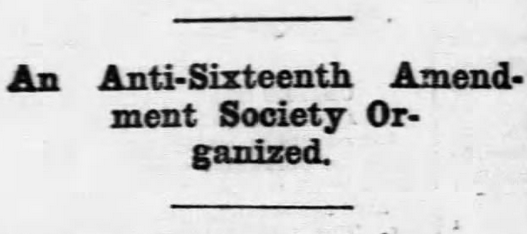
"An Anti-Sixteenth Amendment Society Organized," headline from the Chicago Tribune, April 18, 1870

The Anti-Sixteenth Amendment Society was an American anti-suffrage group in the late nineteenth century. It was formed in 1869. Madeleine Vinton Dahlgren was the leader and other prominent women were involved. Members of the group opposed giving women the right to vote and petitioned the United States Congress against women's suffrage.

== History ==
The Anti-Sixteenth Amendment Society was formed in 1869 and led by Madeleine Vinton Dahlgren. It was the first women-led anti-suffrage group in the United States. The first two meetings were held at Dahlgren's home. Other members included Catherine Beecher, Almira Lincoln Phelps, and Mrs. William Tecumseh Sherman. The group sent a petition to the United States Congress against women's suffrage and reprinted the petition in Godey's Lady's Book and Magazine. The reprinted petition was copied by anti-suffragists who used it to collect around five thousand signatures which were given to Congress in February 1871.

== Beliefs ==
Members of the Anti-Sixteenth Amendment Society believed that giving women the vote would hurt the family structure. In addition, they believed that women had enough duties at the home and they did not want to "bear other and heavier burdens."
