= Jean Pierre Roman Bureau =

Early settler of Gallipolis, Ohio

Jean Pierre Romain Bureau, also known as John Peter Roman Bureau, Roman Bureau, J.P.R. Bureau, or simply P. Bureau, (c. March 1770 – c. 1851) was a French-American settler, remembered as one of the founders of Gallipolis, Ohio and a member of the Ohio General Assembly. He was also the father-in-law of both ten-term congressman Samuel Finley Vinton and Francis Julius LeMoyne, a physician who built the first crematory in the United States.

== Life ==
Jean Pierre Romain Bureau was born in March, 1770 at Beton-Bazoches in the French province of Île-de-France. As a young man, he pursued the trade of a silk merchant at Rheims. He was in Paris at the beginning of the French Revolution. He participated in the Storming of the Bastille on July 14, 1789, helping to demolish the infamous prison.

Soon afterward, Bureau joined a group of settlers escaping the tumult of the Revolution, hoping to settle in the Northwest Territory of the newly independent United States. On their arrival in October, 1791, they found that their deeds were worthless, as the Scioto Company had never paid for the land they had meant to settle. Instead of being taken to their intended destination, near the present site of Wheelersburg and Franklin Furnace, Ohio, approximately one hundred and seventy colonists were deposited at what became known as Gallipolis. There, a series of crude huts had been laid out for them on land owned by the Ohio Company, which had begun the settlement of Ohio with the establishment of Marietta in 1788.

Unable to find work at Gallipolis, Roman Bureau traveled upriver to Marietta. There he befriended Edward W. Tupper, the son of General Benjamin Tupper, with whom Bureau lived for some months. The following year, Bureau returned to Gallipolis, and served as commissary of the troops that had been raised to fight in the Northwest Indian War.

In the years that followed, Bureau and J. Matthieu Berthelot were appointed agents to negotiate with the Ohio Company for the purchase of the land on which they were then living. In 1795, the Ohio Company agreed to sell the land to the colonists, and a further 25,200 acres was granted them by the United States in 1795 and 1798. Bureau and Berthelot were two of the commissioners appointed on December 16, 1795 to survey and lay out the various lots, allocating them to each claimant.

Bureau subsequently held a series of positions of trust at Gallipolis, including postmaster, justice of the peace, and clerk of the supreme and common pleas courts of Gallia County, which had been established in 1803. He represented Gallia County in the Ohio Senate from the Seventh to the Tenth General Assemblies (1808–1811), and in the Ohio House of Representatives during the Fourteenth General Assembly (1815). He also surveyed land in both Ohio and Virginia.

Jean Pierre Romain Bureau died in 1851, at the age of eighty-one, and is buried in the Pine Street Cemetery at Gallipolis.

== Family and legacy ==
In 1799, Bureau married sixteen-year-old Madeleine Françoise Charlotte Marret, daughter of Peter and Madeleine Marret. Because there was no justice of the peace at Gallipolis to preside over the wedding, they hired a justice from neighboring Point Pleasant, Virginia, who married them on a boat on the Ohio. Madeleine died in June 1834, at the age of fifty-one, and was buried in the Pine Street Cemetery.

Their children included:

- Madeleine Romaine Bureau (1799–1873), who married Francis Julius LeMoyne (1798–1879). LeMoyne studied medicine at Washington College in Washington, Pennsylvania. A prominent physician, philanthropist, and abolitionist at Washington, Pennsylvania, in 1876 he built the first crematory in the United States.
- Romaine Madeleine Bureau (1802–1831), who married Samuel Finley Vinton (1792–1862). Vinton served ten terms in the United States House of Representatives, where he helped establish the Department of the Interior, and was considered an authority on parliamentary procedure.
- Charles Louis Valcaulon Bureau (1812–1848), who also studied medicine at Washington College. He married Margaret Hughes, and was a physician at Gallipolis until his death.
- Mary Bureau, who is interred with her parents in the Pine Street Cemetery.

Among Roman Bureau's namesakes was John Peter Roman Bureau Smith (1838–1911), for many years clerk of the county court in neighboring Mason County, West Virginia. Before the Civil War, Smith had been colonel of the 106th Regiment of Virginia Militia, and during the war he served in the Home Guard. He was deputy sheriff for eight years, and clerk of the county court from 1879 to 1908.

On the occasion of Gallipolis' centennial celebration, observed from October 16 to 19, 1890, a number of Roman Bureau's possessions were displayed as part of a relic room housing artifacts and belongings of the early settlers. Among other items, the collection included his chair, a snuff-box with a picture of the United States Constitution on its lid, and a picture of the Virgin Mary.
