= Elizabeth Wharton Drexel =

American author and socialite (1868–1944)

The Right Honourable The Lady Decies
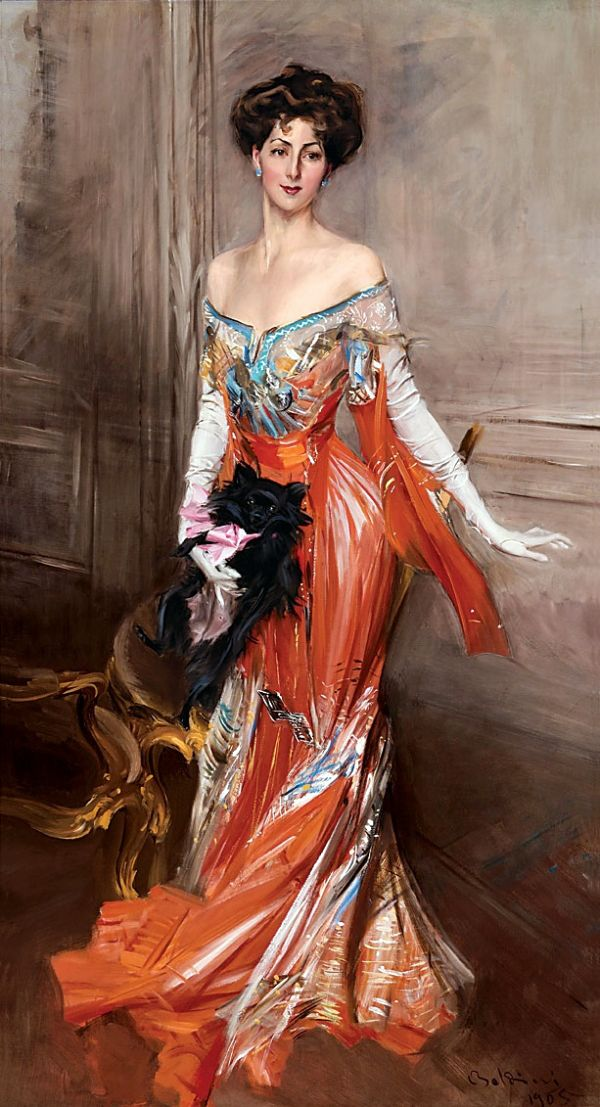
- A 1905 portrait of Drexel by Giovanni Boldini
- Born: Elizabeth Wharton "Bessie" Drexel; April 22, 1868; Philadelphia, Pennsylvania, U.S.
- Died: June 13, 1944 (aged 76); Manhattan, New York, U.S.
- Burial place: Dahlgren Chapel, Georgetown University, Washington, D.C.
- Spouses: John Vinton Dahlgren (m. 1889; died 1899) Henry Symes Lehr (m. 1901; died 1929) The 5th Baron Decies (m. 1936; died 1944)
- Children: Joseph Drexel Dahlgren; John Vinton Dahlgren II
- Parents: Joseph William Drexel; Lucy Wharton
- Relatives: Francis Anthony Drexel (uncle); Anthony Joseph Drexel (uncle); St. Katharine Drexel (cousin)

Elizabeth Wharton Beresford, Baroness Decies (née Drexel, formerly Dahlgreen and Lehr, April 22, 1868 – June 13, 1944) was an American author, philanthropist, and Manhattan socialite.

== Early life ==
Drexel and Henry Symes Lehr at their wedding in 1901

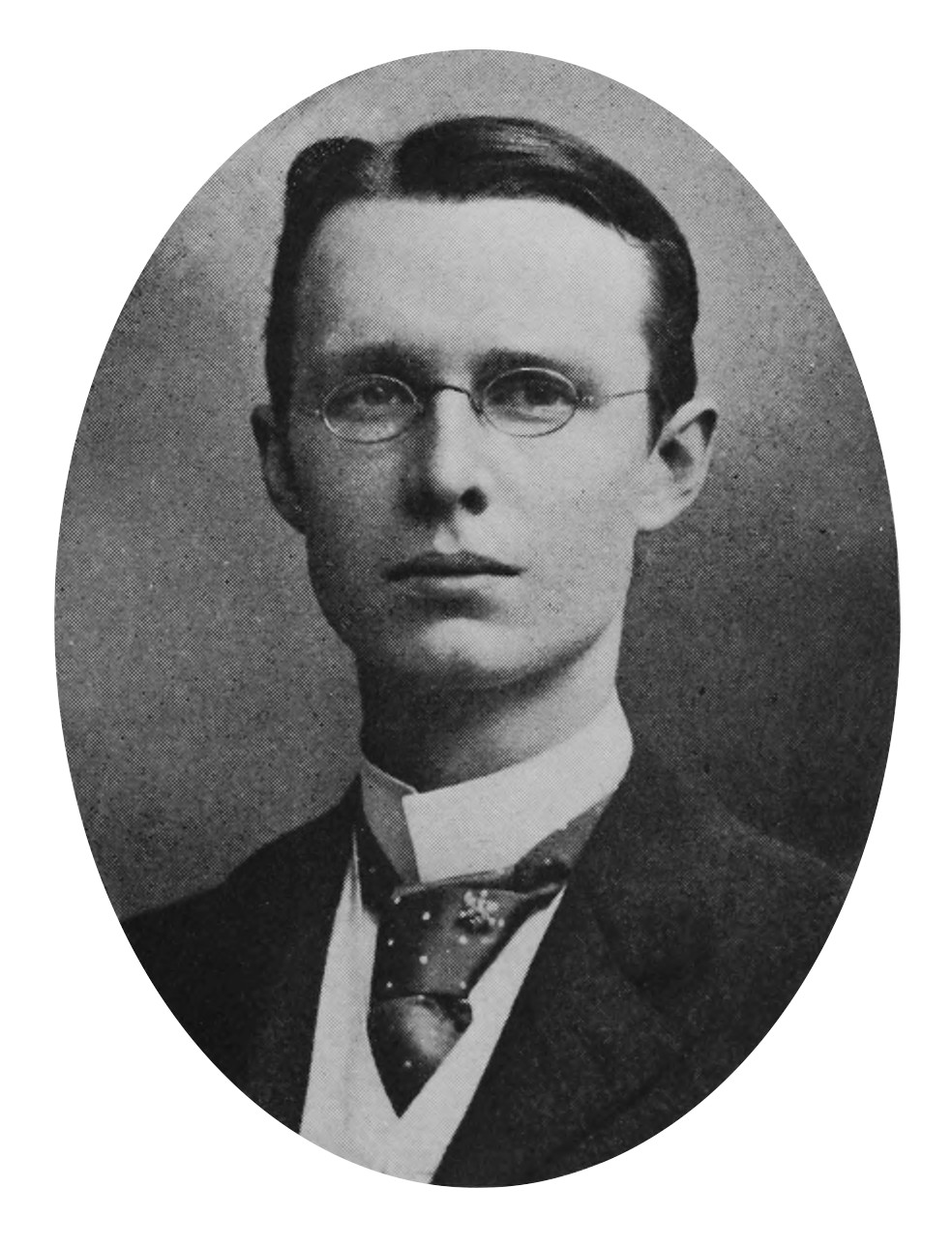
Drexel's first husband, John V. Dahlgren, c. 1897

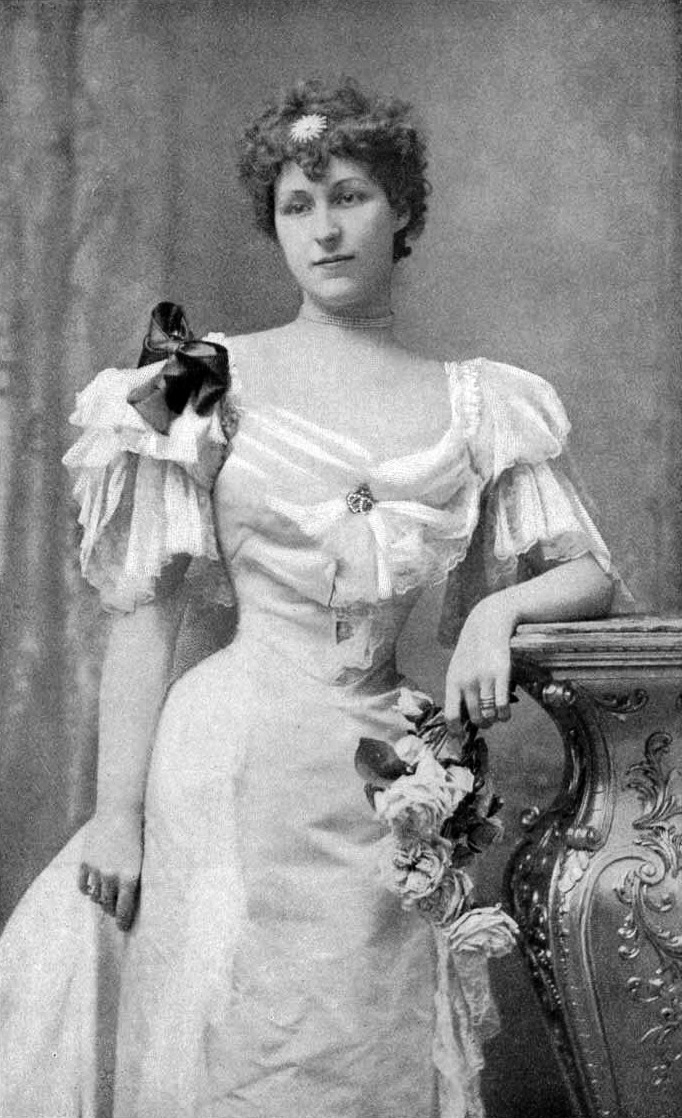
Drexel in 1899

Drexel was born on April 22, 1868, in Philadelphia, Pennsylvania, the daughter of Lucy Wharton and Joseph William Drexel. Her paternal grandfather was the son of Francis Martin Drexel, the immigrant ancestor of Anthony Joseph Drexel who founded present-day J.P. Morgan & Co. and was influential in developing the private banking system of the United States. Thomas Wharton Jr., the first president of Pennsylvania was her mother's great-grandfather.

== Career ==
Drexel was an author who published two books, King Lehr and the Gilded Age (1935) and Turn of the World (1937). The first, published after the death of her second husband, tells the story of her unhappy marriage to Henry Lehr, which was referred to as a "tragic farce" of a 28-year marriage. Time magazine described it as:

A bitter, disillusioned book, 'King Lehr' is memorable for the lurid light it throws on U. S. Society of the Gilded Age, may confidently be opened as one of the most startling and scandalously intimate records of life among the wealthy yet written by one of them.

Her second book, and first as Lady Decies, Turn of the World, was also a semi-autobiographical history of American high society during the Gay Nineties up through World War I.

In Paris, she purchased and renovated the Hôtel de Cavoye at 52 Rue des Saints-Pères in the 7th Arrondissement. The hôtel particulier was built as the Paris residence of Louis d'Oger, Marquis de Cavoye, a Favorite of King Louis XIV who served as Grand Marshall of the Royal Household at Versailles. At her home, she hosted receptions, including for Prince Christian of Hesse and his American wife, the former Elizabeth Reid Rogers.

== Personal life ==
=== First marriage ===
On June 29, 1889, Elizabeth married John Vinton Dahlgren (1869–1899), a graduate from Georgetown University and the son of Admiral John A. Dahlgren (1809–1870) at St. Patrick's Cathedral in New York City. Together, they had two sons:

- Joseph Drexel Dahlgren (1890–1891), who died as an infant
- John Vinton Dahlgren Jr. (1892–1964), who married Helen Broderick in 1946, was a graduate of Harvard and Georgetown.

During this marriage, she made generous donations to Roman Catholic charities and to Georgetown University, including funds for the construction of Dahlgren Chapel, which was named for her first son. Georgetown University asked for her portrait, which was painted in 1899 by the Swiss-born American artist Adolfo Müller-Ury (1862–1947).

Dahlgren died August 11, 1899, in Colorado Springs, Colorado, where he had gone in hopes of recovering from tuberculosis.

=== Second marriage ===
In June 1901, Elizabeth married Henry Symes Lehr (1869–1929), aka Harry Lehr. The marriage was never consummated. According to her, on her wedding night, her husband told her that he loathed her and could not stand the thought of touching her ever, although he wanted her to understand she was to be cordial to him in public and he might in turn occasionally call her "darling". He had, he admitted, married her for her money because poverty terrified him.

In 1915, the Lehrs were in Paris, and Elizabeth worked for the Red Cross. They remained in Paris after World War I, where they bought in 1923 the Hôtel de Cavoye at 52, rue des Saints-Pères in the 7th arrondissement. Harry Lehr died on January 3, 1929, of a brain malady in Baltimore.

=== Third marriage ===
On May 25, 1936, she married The Rt Hon. The 5th Baron Decies (1866–1944), a widower and Anglo-Irish peer who had previously been married to Helen Vivien Gould (1893–1931). Upon this marriage, she became The Rt Hon. Baroness Decies.

Lord Decies filed suit for divorce in 1942, which Lady Decies contested. In 1943, she appeared in the photograph "The Critic" by Weegee.

Lord Decies died on January 31, 1944, at his Ascot home.

== Death ==
Elizabeth, Lady Decies, died at the Hotel Shelton in Manhattan, on June 13, 1944. She was buried in the crypt below Dahlgren Chapel at Georgetown University, which she and her first husband had built as a memorial to their first son, Joseph Drexel Dahlgren, who died in infancy.

== Published works ==
- "King Lehr" and the Gilded Age (1935) ISBN 1-4047-8242-7
- Turn of the World (1937) ISBN 978-1-4290-9080-3
