= Dahlgren Chapel (Maryland) =

Defunct Catholic chapel in Maryland

Coordinates: 39°29′4.1″N 77°37′8.2″W

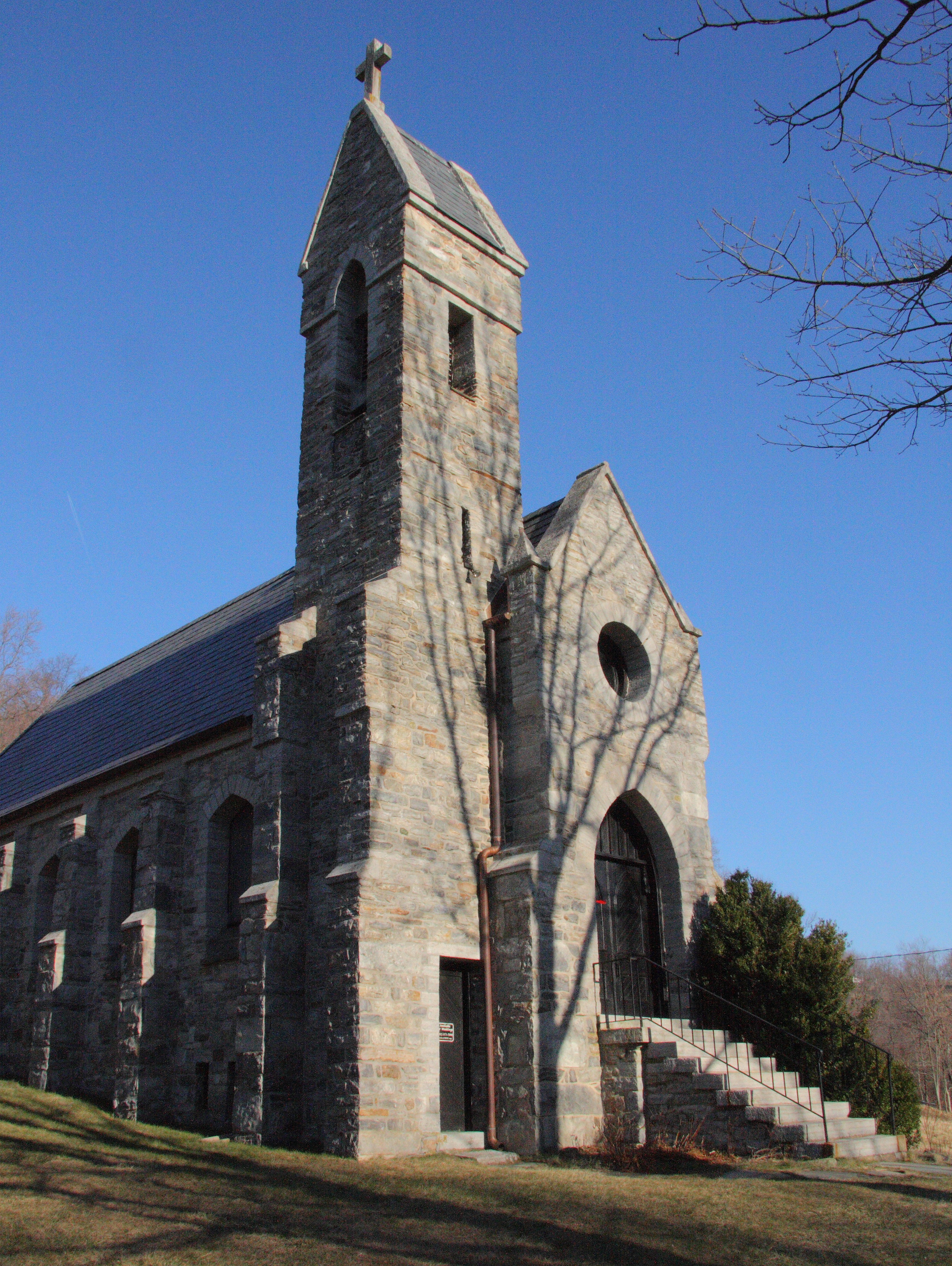
Dahlgren Chapel in Maryland in January 2009

Dahlgren Chapel is located at the summit of Turner's Gap in Western Maryland between Middletown and Boonsboro. The Gothic revival stone chapel was built in 1881 and consecrated as the Chapel of St. Joseph of the Sacred Heart of Jesus. Most of the building materials came from the immediate area of the site, while a marble altar was imported from Italy.

The chapel was built for Sarah Madeleine Vinton Dahlgren, daughter of Congressman Samuel Finley Vinton, who had married Admiral John A. Dahlgren, inventor of the Dahlgren gun, in 1865. Admiral Dahlgren died in 1870. Mrs. Dahlgren purchased a former tavern on South Mountain at Turner's Gap as a summer retreat, naming it Dahlgren Manor. The chapel was built across the National Road from the house. When Mrs. Dahlgren died in 1898, she was interred in the chapel's family crypt.

After a period under the ownership of the Sisters of the Holy Cross from 1922 to 1925 the chapel returned to the Dahlgren family. It was purchased in 1960 by Richard G. Griffin, who undertook a restoration. The property was acquired by the Central Maryland Heritage League in 1996. The chapel is included in the Turner's and Fox's Gaps Historic District, but as a non-contributing structure, owing to its post-Civil War construction, which places it outside the historic district's time of historic emphasis.
