= Dahlgren Chapel of the Sacred Heart =

Catholic chapel in Washington, D.C.

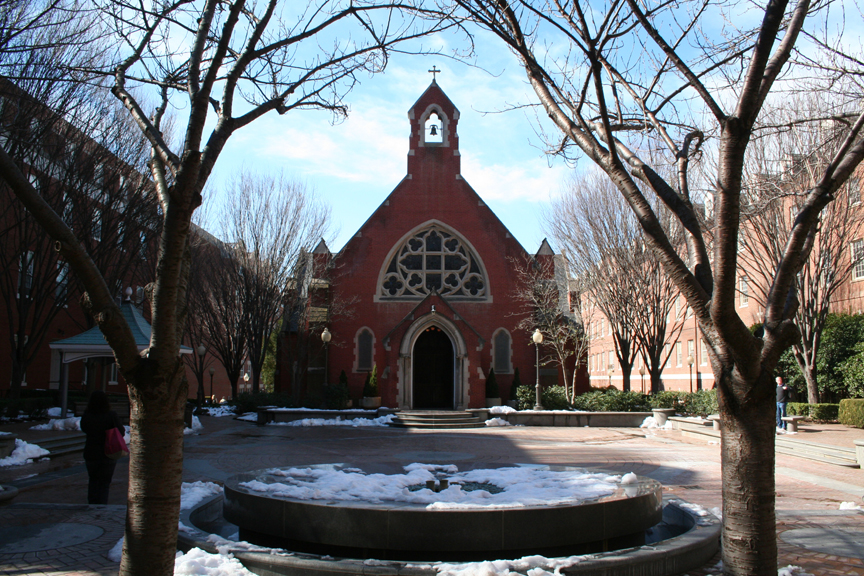
- Front of the chapel in Dahlgren Quadrangle
- Dahlgren Chapel of the Sacred Heart
- 38°54′26.2″N 77°4′24.8″W
- Location: Dahlgren Quadrangle, Old N. Way, Georgetown University, Washington, D.C., U.S.
- Denomination: Roman Catholic
- Religious institute: Society of Jesus

History
- Status: Chapel
- Dedication: Sacred Heart
- Consecrated: 1893

Architecture
- Functional status: Active
- Style: Gothic Revival
- Groundbreaking: 1892
- Completed: 1893

Specifications
- Capacity: 275
- Materials: Brick

Administration
- Archdiocese: Archdiocese of Washington
- Parish: Holy Trinity
- Dahlgren Chapel of the Sacred Heart
- U.S. National Historic Landmark District – Contributing property
- D.C. Inventory of Historic Sites
- Website: campusministry.georgetown.edu/dahlgren/
- Part of: Georgetown Historic District (ID67000025)

Significant dates
- Designated NHLDCP: May 28, 1967
- Designated DCIHS: November 8, 1964

Dahlgren Chapel of the Sacred Heart, often shortened to Dahlgren Chapel, is a Roman Catholic chapel located in Dahlgren Quadrangle on the main campus of Georgetown University in Washington, D.C. The chapel was built in 1893, and is located in the historic center of the campus.

The chapel falls within the territorial jurisdiction of the Archdiocese of Washington and is administered by Jesuits. It is a part of the Parish of the Holy Trinity.

Located in the Georgetown neighborhood, the chapel is a contributing property of the Georgetown Historic District and is listed on the District of Columbia Inventory of Historic Sites.

== History ==
=== Construction ===
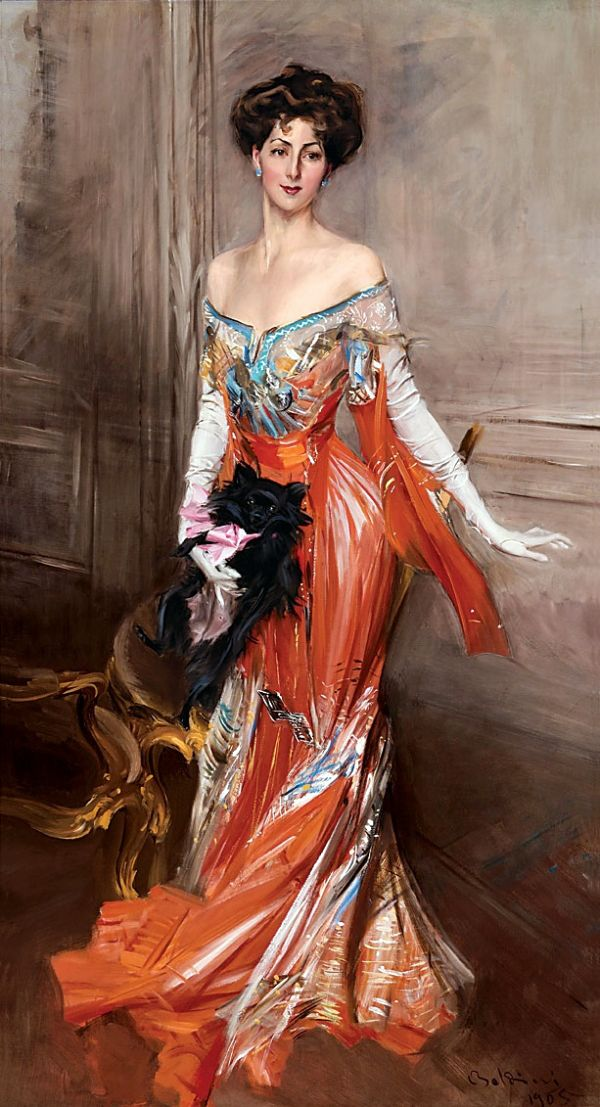
Elizabeth Dahlgren, the original benefactor of Dahlgren Chapel, who is buried in its crypt

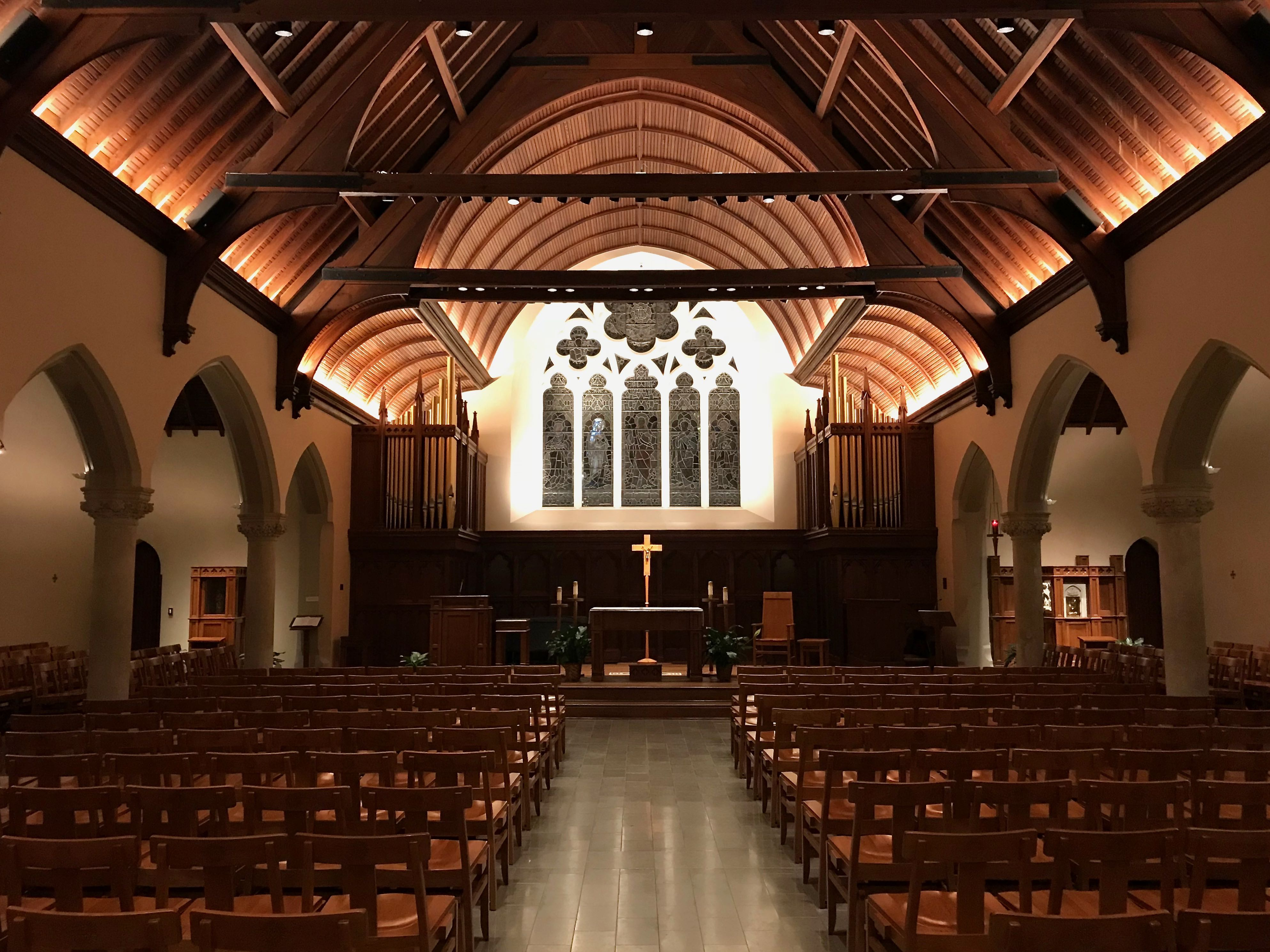
Interior of the chapel at night

Construction on Dahlgren Chapel began in 1892. Built with red brick, the chapel was the first building on Georgetown University's campus to be funded entirely by external philanthropy and the first to be named after a non-Jesuit. Elizabeth Wharton Drexel, spouse of Georgetown undergraduate, graduate, and law school alumnus John Vinton Dahlgren, whose father was Rear Admiral John Dahlgren, donated $10,000 for its construction as a memorial to their first son, Joseph Drexel Dahlgren, who died at the age of one year in 1891.

Drexel took a personal interest in overseeing the fabrication of the stained glass windows, which were designed by Franz Mayer of Munich. The windows depict sixteen unique scenes of Jesus, the Virgin Mary, and several saints including Joan of Arc and Ignatius of Loyola. At the laying of the cornerstone, an address was given by James Gibbons, the Archbishop of Baltimore.

Construction of the roughly neo-Gothic building was completed in 1893, and dedication of the Sacred Heart of Jesus occurred that same year. At the time of its completion, Dahlgren Chapel was positioned in the geographic center of campus, behind Healy Hall and adjacent to Old North, the oldest-standing building on campus. It now resides in the historic and administrative center of campus and, along with its surrounding buildings, encloses Dahlgren Quadrangle. Prior to the opening of the new house of worship, students utilized a chapel on the second floor of Isaac Hawkins Hall, known then as Mulledy Hall.

Beneath the altar of the chapel is the Dahlgren family crypt, where Elizabeth and John Dahlgren and their son, Joseph, are buried The church bell atop the chapel was the bell of the Calvert mission in the Maryland colony.

=== Historic cross ===
After years of disregard, a large iron cross was rediscovered in the basement of Healy Hall in 1989. The 2-foot (0.61 m) by 4-foot (1.2 m) cross, weighing 24 pounds (11 kg), is horizontally inscribed with "ad perpetuam rei memoriam", which translates from Latin as "may this be eternally remembered," and vertically inscribed with "This cross is said to have been brought by the first settlers from England to St. Mary's." It is believed to have been carried by ship from England to St. Clement's Island and St. Mary's City of the Maryland Colony by the Jesuits, making it the first Roman Catholic Mass said in English-speaking North America. The cross is housed in Dahlgren Chapel.

The cross was used in a Mass celebrated by Pope Francis at the Basilica of the National Shrine on September 23, 2015, when he visited Washington, D.C., his first Mass in the United States as Pope.

The cross was displayed in an exhibition of the Smithsonian Institution at the National Museum of American History for one year in 2017.

Though weddings in the chapel were suspended by the archdiocese in the 1990s, the chapel is now a popular venue for weddings of Georgetown alumni.

=== 21st century ===
In 2011, Georgetown undertook an $8 million renovation of the chapel, the fourth in its history. Major structural renovations and interior refurbishments were made, including a reinforcement of the foundation, and the stained glass windows were removed, re-leaded, and re-installed. A new pipe organ was installed during the renovation. The building had previously been renovated in 1976 and 1990. Following its most recent renovation, the chapel can seat 275 people.

In 2013, the chapel was vandalized, which resulted in damage to furniture and a processional cross. An investigation concluded the damage was not motivated by religious desecration.

== In popular culture ==
- In 1973, the exterior of Dahlgren Chapel was featured in The Exorcist. In the movie, the chapel is the residence of Damien Karras, a Catholic priest and psychiatrist in residence. The chapel is desecrated early in the movie.
- In 1990, the chapel was featured in The Exorcist III.

== Image gallery ==
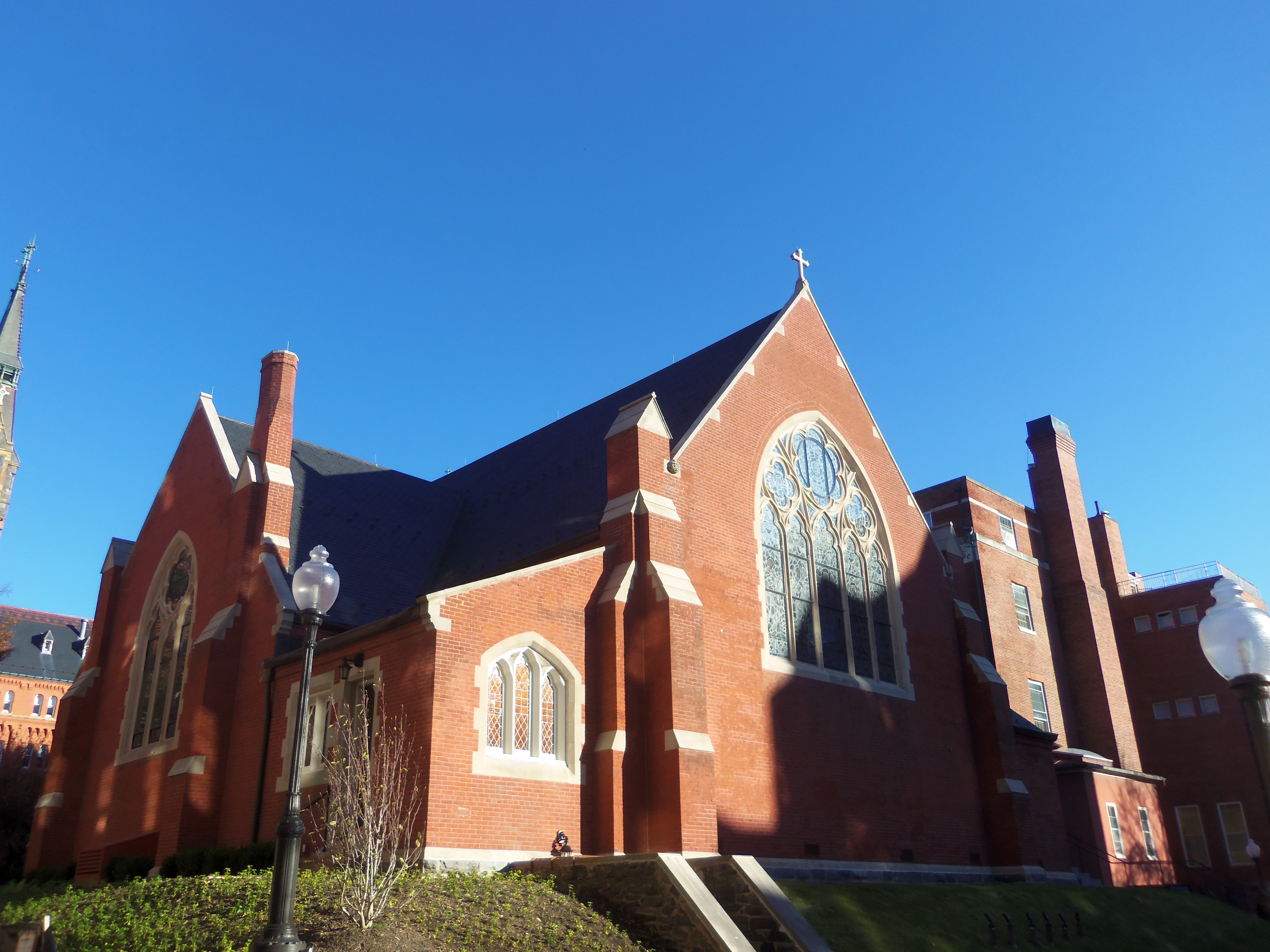
Rear view of Dahlgren Chapel

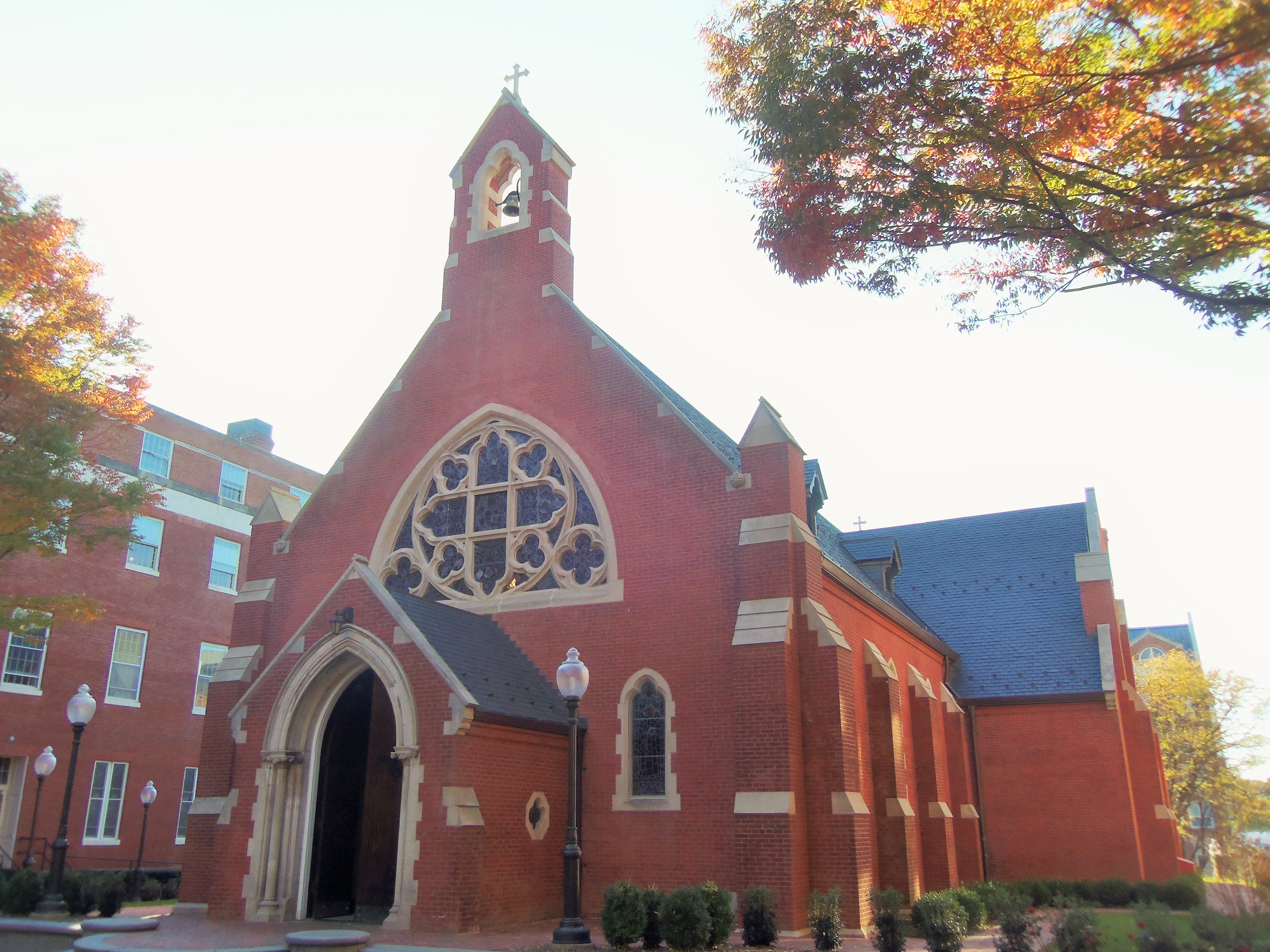
Front entrance from Dahlgren Quadrangle

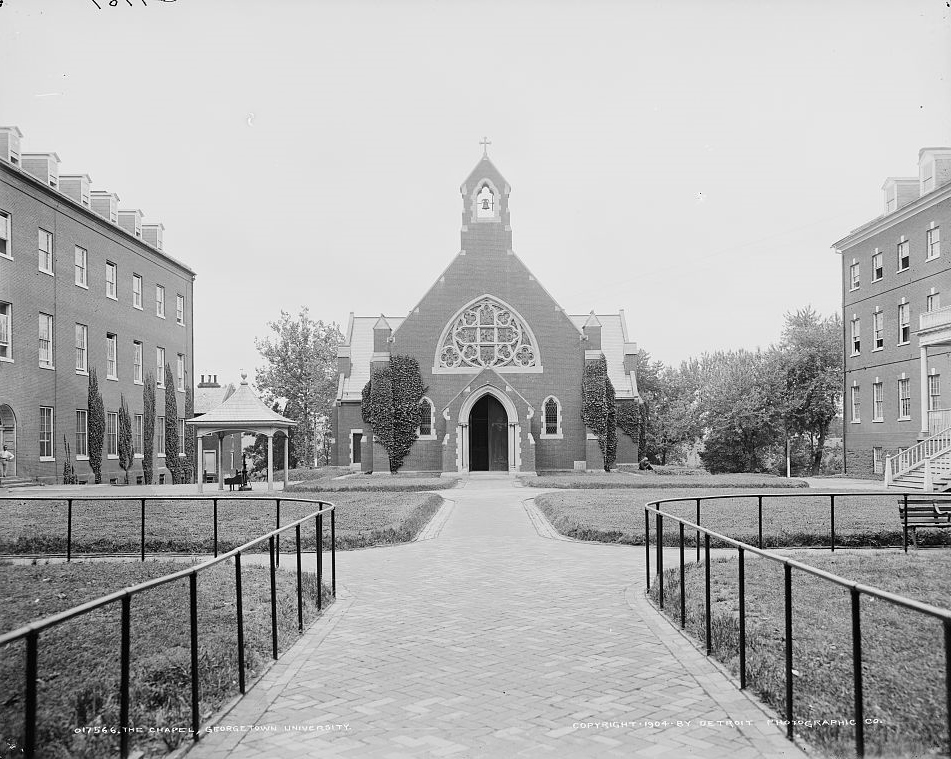
Dahlgren Chapel ca. 1904 showing a grass lawn in the quadrangle

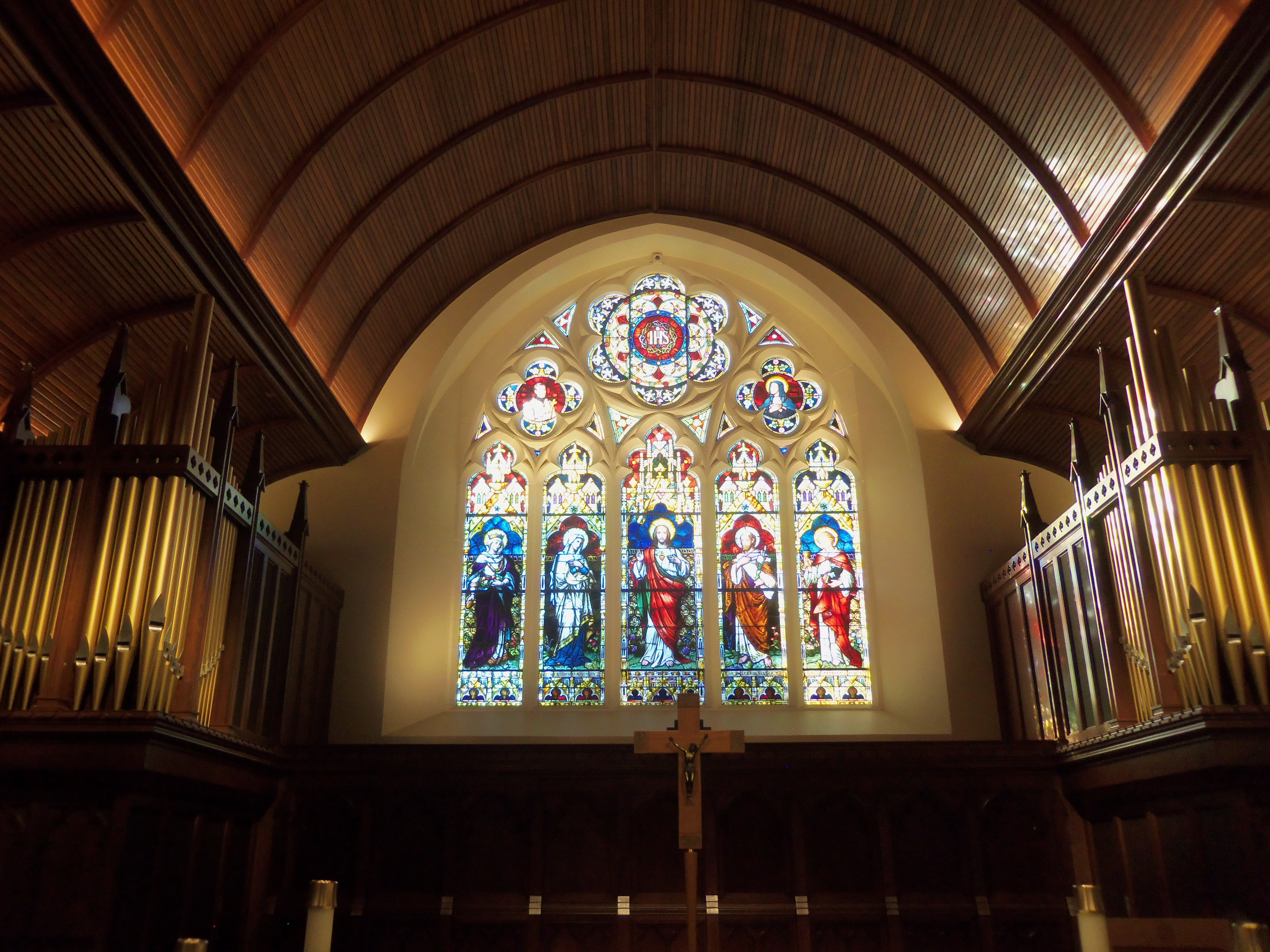
Stained glass window above the altar with organ pipes on either side

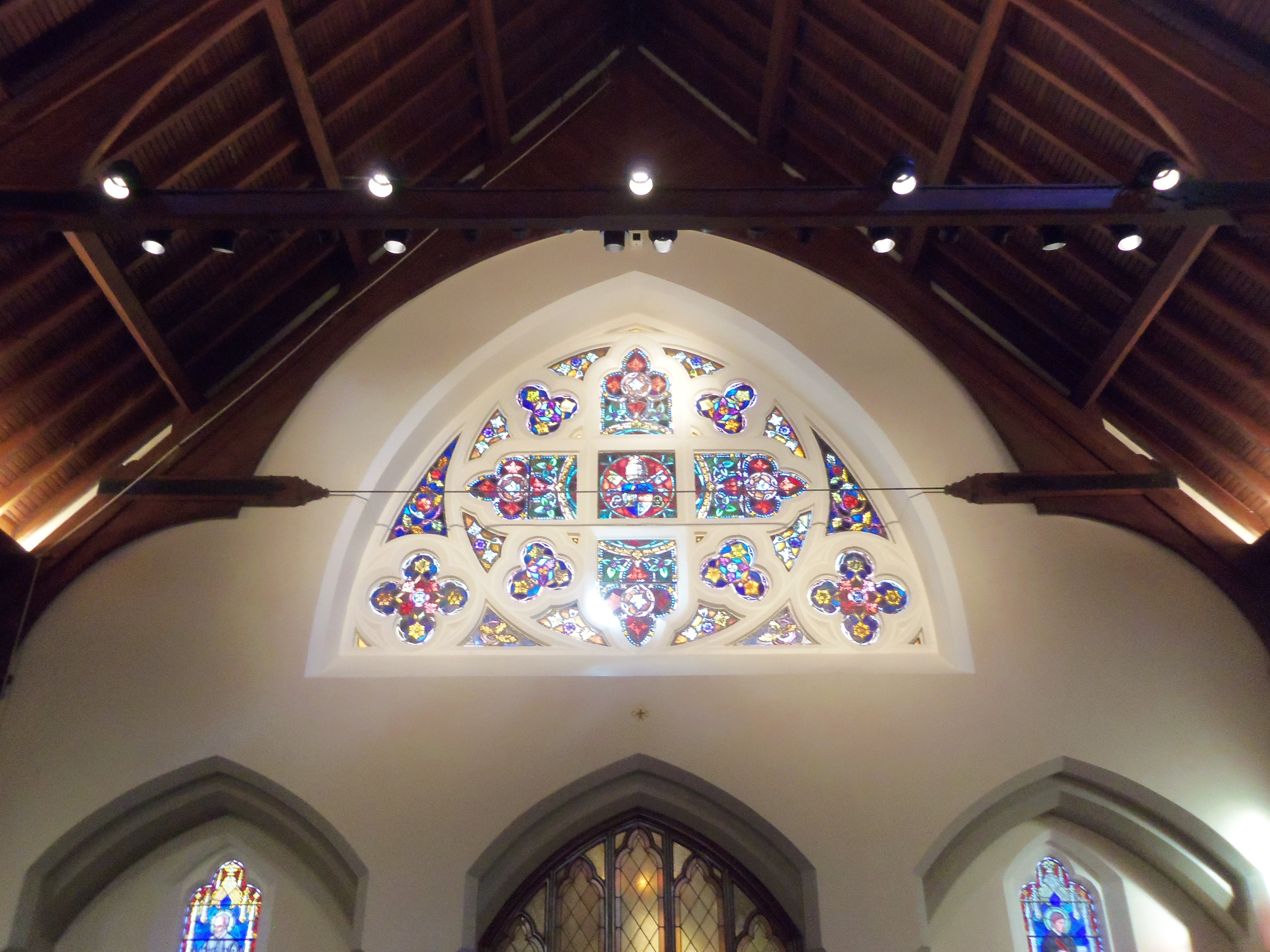
Window above the entrance at the rear of the chapel

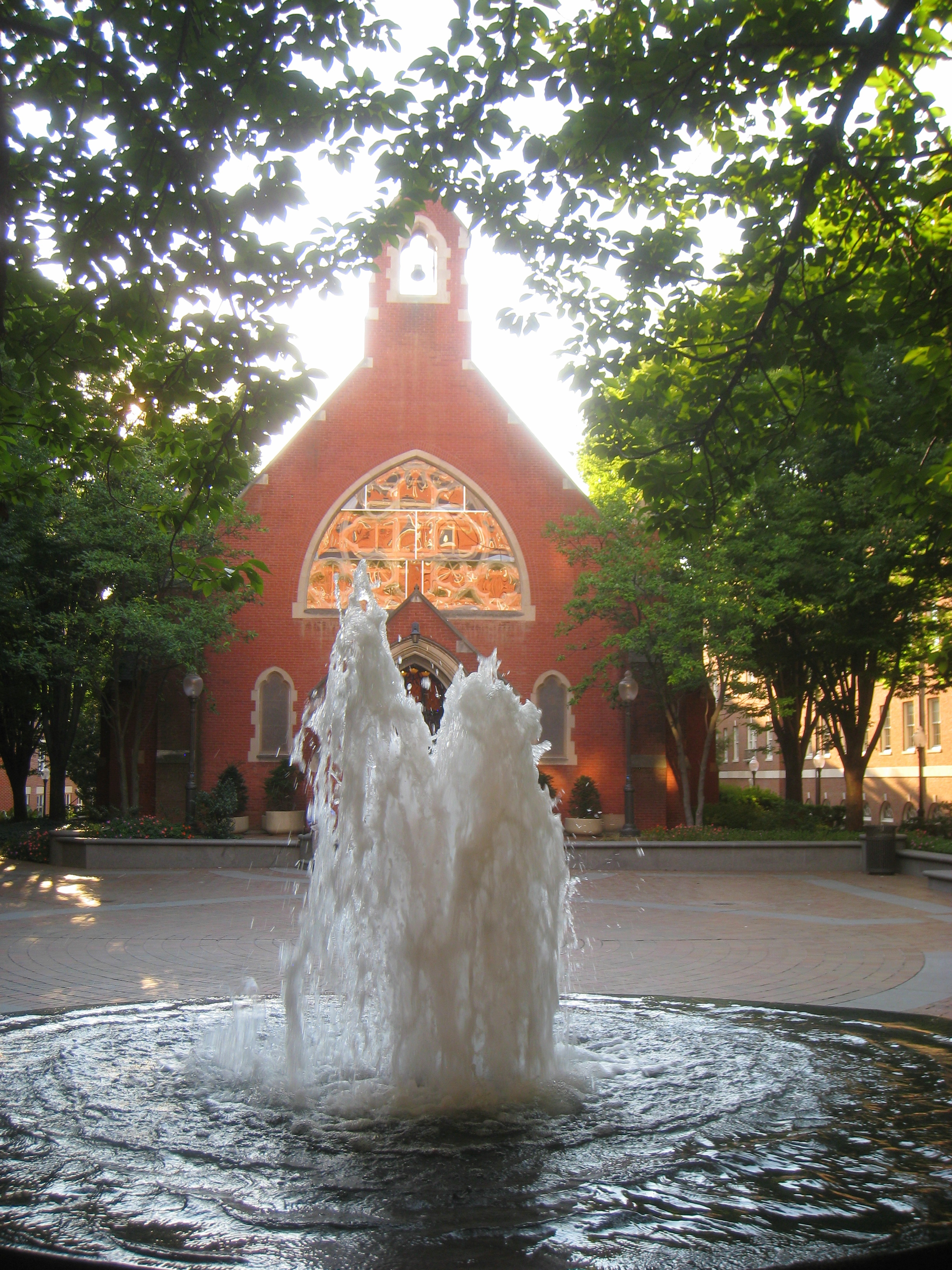
Chapel in early fall

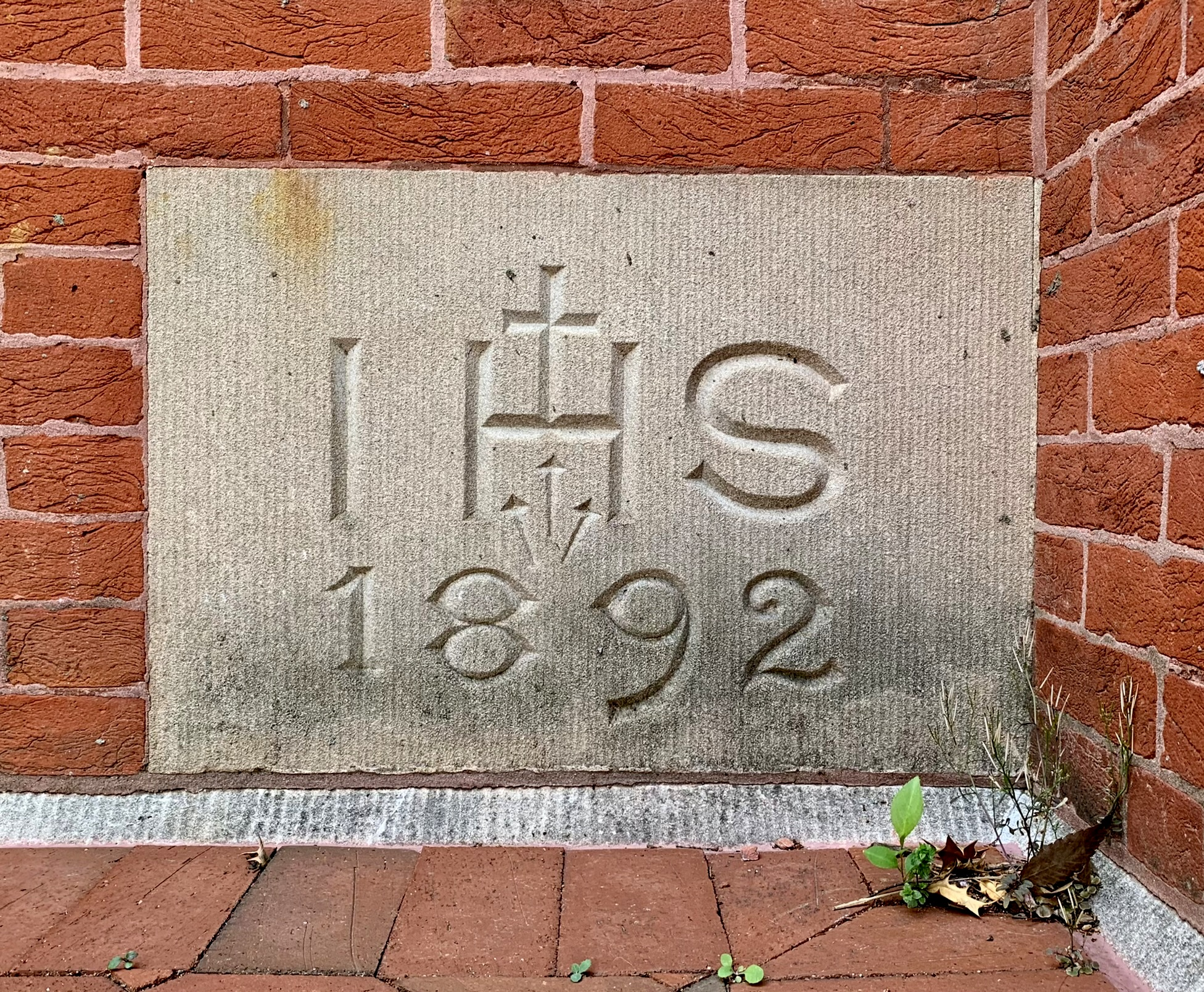
Cornerstone

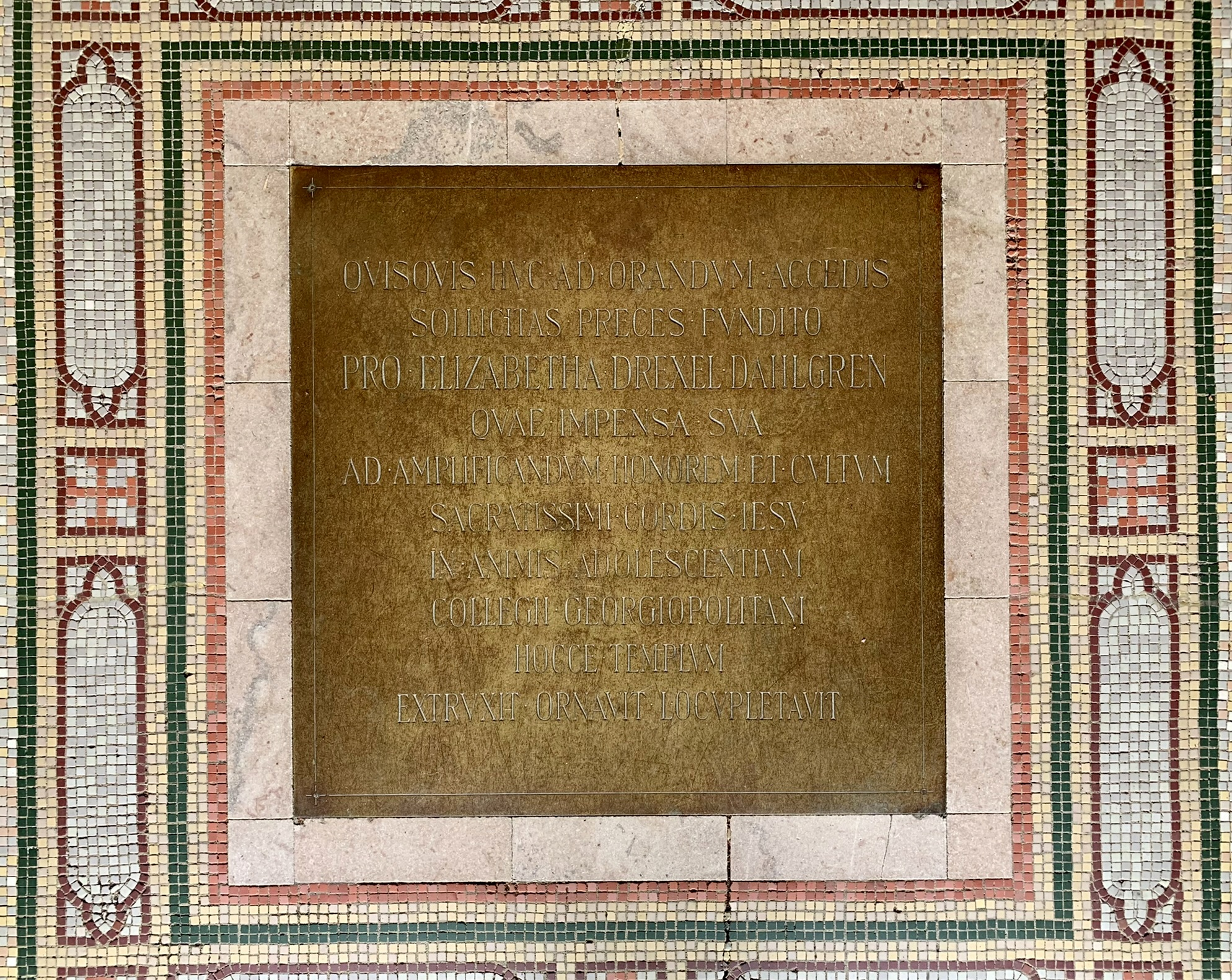
Mosaic at the entrance

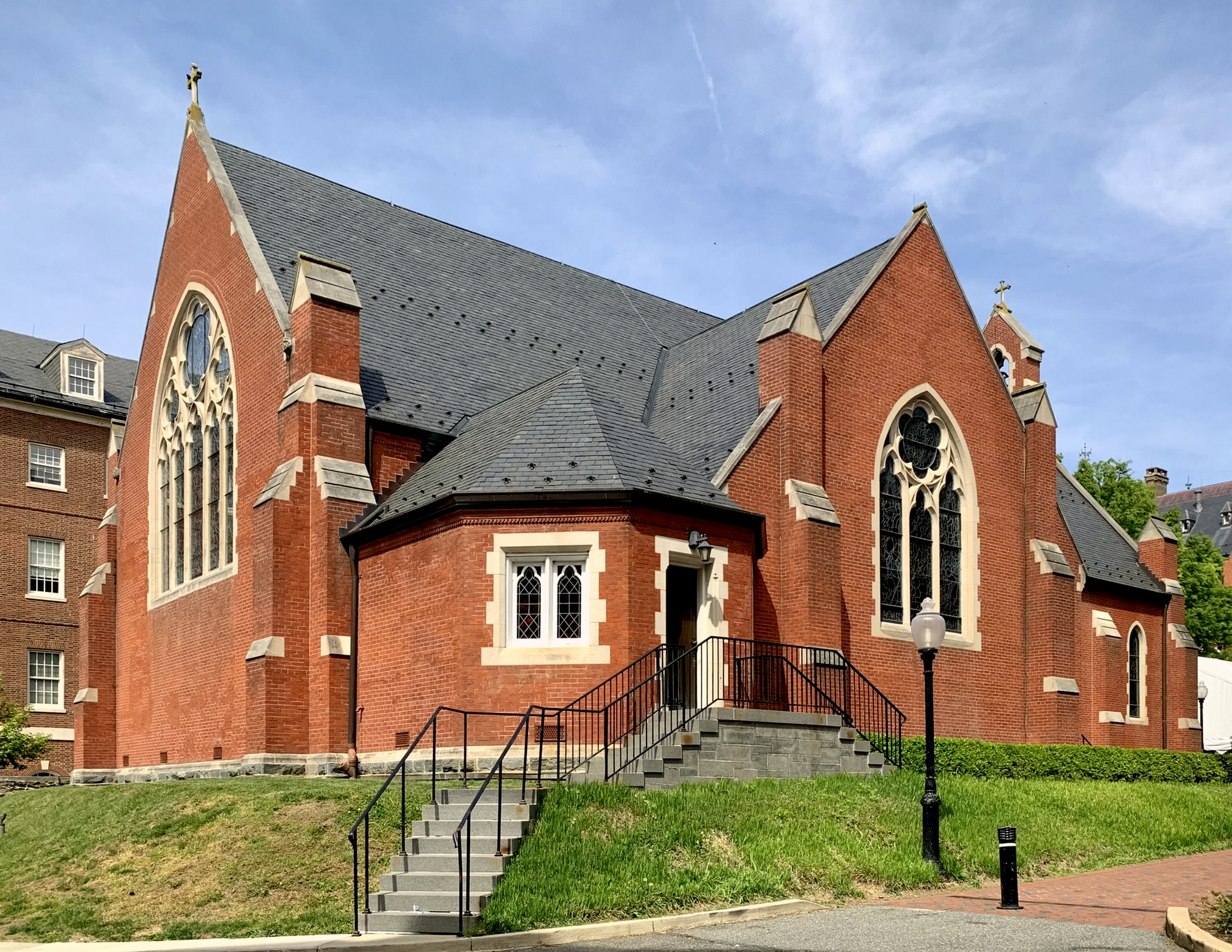
Rear view of the chapel

== See also ==
- Healy Hall
- List of Georgetown University buildings
- List of Jesuit sites
- Old North Building
