= Samuel F. Vinton =

American politician (1792–1862)

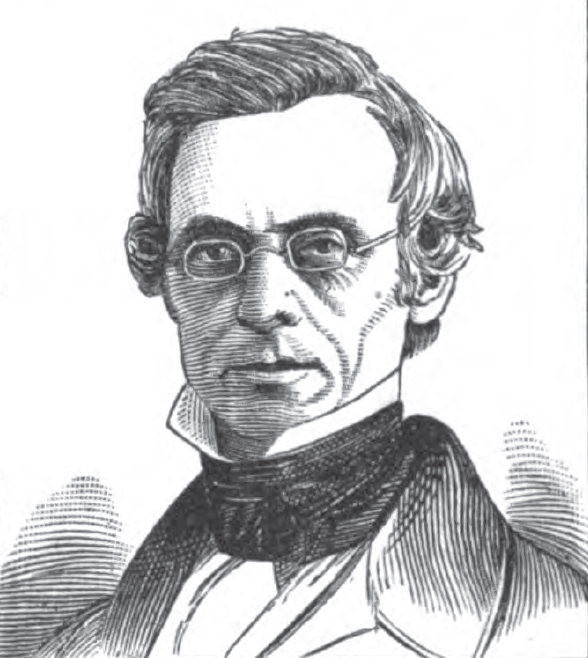
- sketch from Historical Collections of Ohio

Member of the U.S. House of Representatives from Ohio
- In office March 4, 1823 – March 3, 1837
- Preceded by: District created
- Succeeded by: Calvary Morris
- Constituency: 7th district (1823-1833); 6th district (1833-1837)
- In office March 4, 1843 – March 3, 1851
- Preceded by: Joshua Mathiot
- Succeeded by: John Welch
- Constituency: 12th district

Personal details
- Born: Samuel Finley Vinton; September 25, 1792 South Hadley, Massachusetts, U.S.
- Died: May 11, 1862 (aged 69) Washington, D.C., U.S.
- Resting place: Gallipolis, Ohio
- Party: Anti-Jacksonian; Whig
- Spouse: Romaine Madeleine Bureau
- Children: 2, including Madeleine
- Education: Williams College

Samuel Finley Vinton (September 25, 1792 – May 11, 1862) was a member of the United States House of Representatives from Ohio from March 4, 1823 to March 3, 1837 and again from March 4, 1843 to March 3, 1851.

== Biography ==
Born in South Hadley, Massachusetts, Vinton was the son of Abiatha and Sarah (Day) Vinton. He graduated from Williams College in 1814, paying his way through school by teaching. He studied law and was admitted to the bar in Connecticut in 1816. He then moved to southern Ohio and practiced law in Gallipolis. On August 18, 1824, he married Romaine Madeleine Bureau, daughter of John Peter Roman Bureau and Madeleine Françoise Charlotte Marret, in Gallia County, Ohio. She died in 1831, after the couple had had a son and a daughter, Madeleine Vinton Dahlgren.

=== Congress ===
After holding various local offices, he was elected to the Eighteenth Congress on a non-partisan ballot. Vinton was re-elected to the Nineteenth, Twentieth, Twenty-first, Twenty-second, Twenty Third and Twenty-fourth Congresses. In the Twenty-third Congress he was an Anti-Jacksonian Democrat and in the Twenty-fourth and succeeding Congresses he was a Whig.

=== Later career ===
He did not seek re-election in 1836, returning to Ohio to his successful practice of law. Whig Presidential elector in 1840 for Harrison/Tyler. However, he returned to Congress in 1843, again as a Whig. In his second service in Congress, he was a member of the Twenty-eighth, Twenty-ninth, Thirtieth, and Thirty-first Congresses. He was noted for his service on the Public Lands Committee, helping to create the United States Department of the Interior, and, as Thomas Ewing put it, had "more influence in the House of Representatives, much more, than any other man in it." He was an authority on parliamentary procedure and in the Thirtieth Congress, he declined the Speakership but took the chairmanship of the Ways and Means Committee instead.

President Millard Fillmore offered him the post of Secretary of the Interior, but he declined. He did not run for re-election in 1850, instead running for Governor of Ohio as a Whig in 1851. In 1853, he became president of the Cleveland and Toledo Railroad, retiring the next year to Washington, D.C.

In 1862, President Abraham Lincoln appointed him to appraise the value of slaves freed in the District of Columbia.

He was a trustee of Ohio University from 1848 to 1862.

=== Death and burial ===
He died in Washington that year and was buried in Gallipolis, Ohio.

== Personal life ==
His daughter, Madeleine Vinton Dahlgren was a writer. His son-in-law was Admiral John A. Dahlgren.

== Legacy ==
Vinton County, Ohio and Vinton, Ohio are named for him.

U.S. House of Representatives
Preceded by None	U.S. Representative from Ohio, 7th District; 1823–1833	Succeeded by William Allen
Preceded by William Creighton, Jr.	U.S. Representative from Ohio, 6th District; 1833–1837	Succeeded by Calvary Morris
Preceded by Joshua Mathiot	U.S. Representative from Ohio, 12th District; 1843–1851	Succeeded by John Welch
Party political offices
Preceded by William Johnston	Whig Party nominee for Governor of Ohio; 1851	Succeeded by Nelson Barrere
