= John A. Dahlgren =

American admiral (1809–1870)

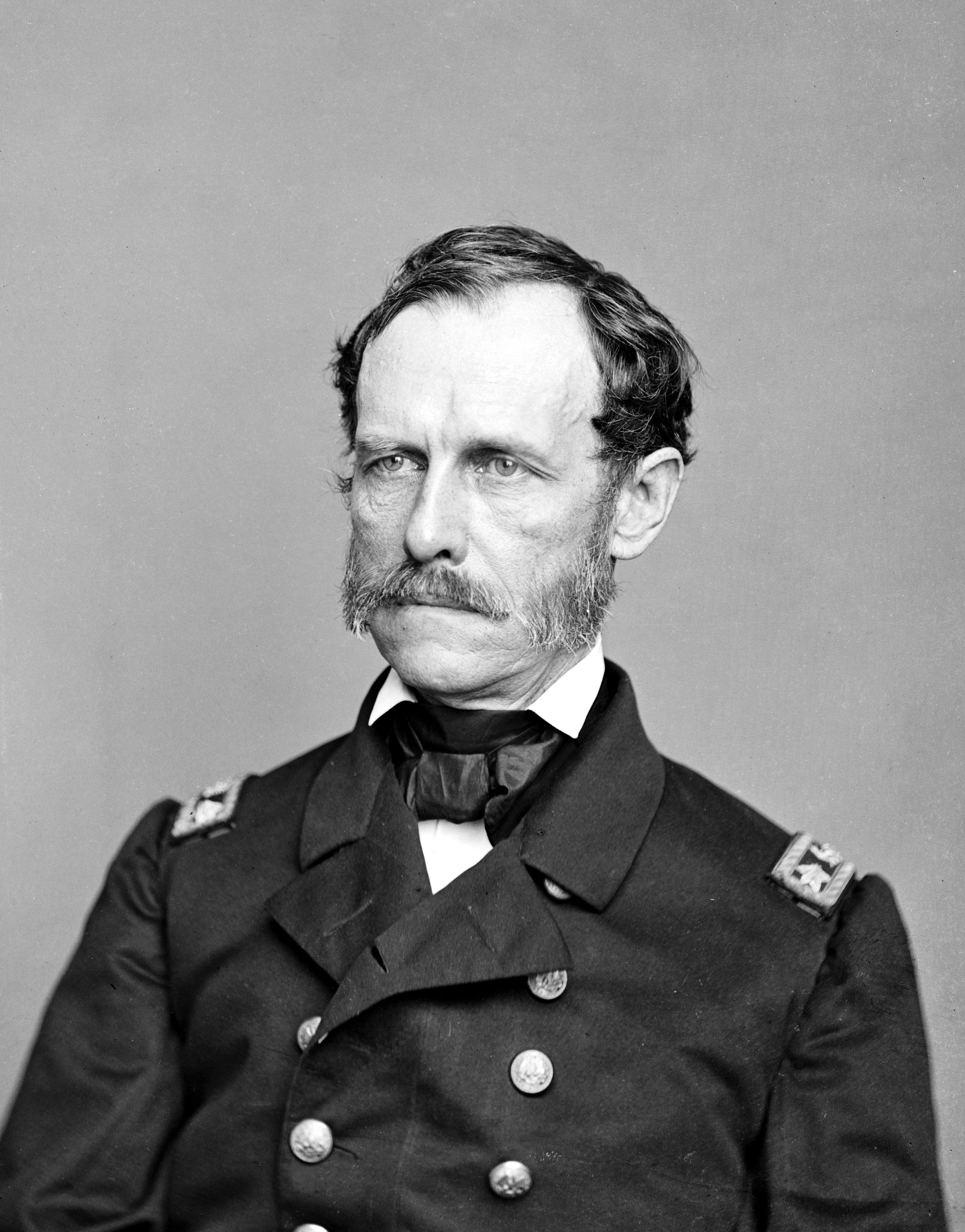
- Dahlgren in uniform, c. 1862
- Born: John Adolphus Bernard Dahlgren; November 13, 1809; Philadelphia, Pennsylvania, U.S.
- Died: July 12, 1870 (aged 60); Philadelphia, Pennsylvania, U.S.
- Burial place: Laurel Hill Cemetery, Philadelphia, Pennsylvania, U.S.
- Spouse: Madeleine Vinton Dahlgren
- Relatives: John Vinton Dahlgren (son); Ulric Dahlgren (son); Charles G. Dahlgren (brother)
- Military career
- Allegiance: United States
- Branch: United States Navy
- Service years: 1826–1870
- Rank: Rear admiral
- Nickname: "Father of American naval ordnance"
- Commands: South Atlantic Blockading Squadron; South Pacific Squadron; Bureau of Ordnance; Washington Navy Yard
- Battles: American Civil War; Siege of Savannah

John Adolphus Bernard Dahlgren (November 13, 1809 – July 12, 1870) was a United States Navy officer who founded his service's Ordnance Department and launched significant advances in gunnery.

Dahlgren devised a smoothbore howitzer, adaptable for many sizes of craft and shore installations. He then introduced a cast-iron muzzle-loading cannon with vastly increased range and accuracy, known as the Dahlgren gun, that became the U.S. Navy's standard armament.

In the Civil War, Dahlgren was made commander of the Washington Navy Yard, where he established the Bureau of Ordnance. In 1863, he took command of the South Atlantic Blockading Squadron at the rank of rear admiral. He helped William Tecumseh Sherman secure Savannah, Georgia.

== Early life and education ==
Coat of arms of John A. Dahlgren

Dahlgren was born on November 13, 1809, in Philadelphia, Pennsylvania, the son of Bernhard Ulrik Dahlgren, a merchant and Swedish Consul in the city.

== Career ==
Dahlgren joined the United States Navy in 1826 as a midshipman and was promoted to the coastal survey in 1834. By 1847, he was an ordnance officer, and at the Washington Navy Yard began to improve and systematize the procurement and supply system for weapons.

=== Establishment of U.S. Navy's Ordnance Department ===
He was assigned to the Washington Navy Yard in 1847. While there, Dahlgren established the U.S. Navy's Ordnance Department; became an ordnance expert; developed a percussion lock; and wrote several books, including The System of Boat Armaments in the United States Navy, Shells and Shell Guns, and Naval Percussion Locks and Primers. Under his command, the U.S. Navy established its own foundry to manufacture new equipment. Its first product was the boat howitzer, designed for use aboard ships and in landings.

=== Model 1861 Navy Percussion Rifle ===
M1861 Navy rifle display the fifth row

The 1861 Navy Rifle, often designated as the Plymouth or Whitney-Plymouth, was engineered in accordance with Dahlgren’s specifications for Navy ordnance and borrowed heavily from the Tige-type rifle, like the .708 caliber Model 1849 Chasseurs de Vincennes used by Western European militaries. Following the development and sea trials of the .69 caliber muzzle-loading rifle aboard the U.S.S. Plymouth from 1856 to 1858, the Whitney Arms Company executed a contract to supply the U.S. Navy with approximately ten thousand units, including both bayonet version, the naval pattern saber and the Bowie knife-style.

==== Dahlgren gun ====
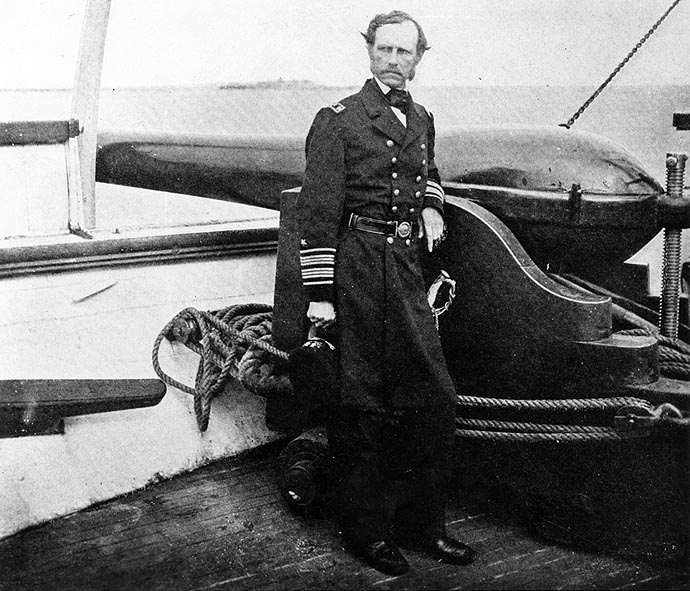
Rear Admiral Dahlgren, on board the USS Pawnee, beside a 50-pounder Dahlgren rifle, one of his bottle-shaped cast-iron cannons, c. 1864

His most famous contribution was the Dahlgren gun, a cast-iron muzzle loading cannon. Dahlgren's meticulous research using gauges to measure pressure differences in the cannon barrel as it was fired resulted in a design that utilized slower-detonating gunpowder and merged characteristics of John Ericsson's experimental 12-inch "Orator" (and Robert Stockton's tragically executed imitation, the "Peacemaker") and the shell-guns adapted by French artillery officer Henri-Joseph Paixhans from their origination in the U.S. Army but named after him. Dahlgren wrote:

Paixhans had so far satisfied naval men of the power of shell guns as to obtain their admission on shipboard; but by unduly developing the explosive element, he had sacrificed accuracy and range. ... The difference between the system of Paixhans and my own was simply that Paixhans guns were strictly shell guns, and were not designed for shot, nor for great penetration or accuracy at long ranges. They were, therefore, auxiliary to, or associates of, the shot-guns. This made a mixed armament, was objectionable as such, and never was adopted to any extent in France ... My idea was, to have a gun that should generally throw shells far and accurately, with the capacity to fire solid shot when needed. Also to compose the whole battery entirely of such guns.

The U.S. Navy had equipped several ships with 8-inch Paixhans guns of 63 and 55 cwt. in 1845, and later a 10-inch shell gun of 86 cwt. In 1854, the six Merrimack-class steam frigates were equipped with 9-inch Dahlgren shell guns. By 1852, the Dahlgren gun had become the standard armament of the United States Navy.

The boat howitzer derived from a requirement realized during the Mexican–American War. During that war, naval landing parties were armed with various army ordnance, often too cumbersome for landing boats. Dahlgren first experimented with standard army-issue 12-pounder mountain howitzers before devising his own guns system. The boat howitzers came in four basic types: small, medium, and heavy versions of the 12-pounder and a larger 24-pounder. All conformed to the same basic shape, straight gun tubes with no adorning bands or clefts. Elevation was made via a screw-threaded into the knob at the breech. Instead of traditional trunnions, the guns were attached to the carriage by a loop under the barrel. The Dahlgren system also included mounting carriages that facilitated various employments of the guns. A single-axle metal carriage was designed for shore use. A bed-type carriage was used on small boats, with a rail system to allow the gun to be trained fore, aft, and broadside. A similar mount was offered for shipboard use. The system of boat howitzers was used by the U.S. Navy well into the 1890s, with some examples used for ceremonial purposes into the 20th Century.

=== American Civil War ===
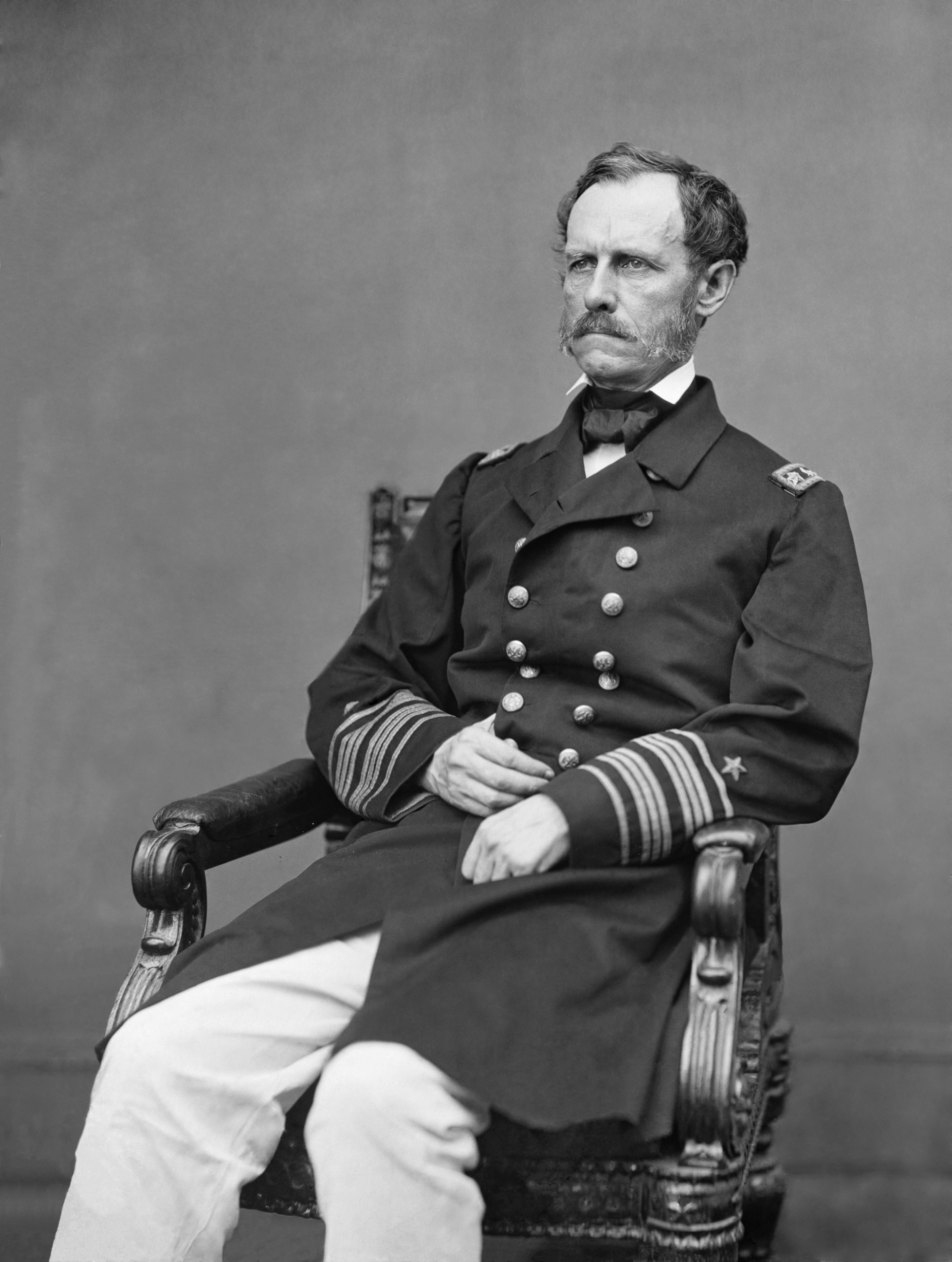
Dahlgren during the American Civil War

In 1861, Dahlgren's superior at the Washington Navy Yard, Franklin Buchanan, resigned to join the Confederate navy. President Abraham Lincoln wanted to name then-Commander Dahlgren to the post of commander of the Washington Navy Yard. By law, however, that position could only be held by an officer with a rank of captain or above. Lincoln successfully persuaded Congress to pass a special act legalizing Dahlgren's appointment to the yard. In July 1862, Dahlgren was promoted to captain and made chief of the Bureau of Ordnance. In February 1863, Dahlgren was promoted to rear admiral and took command of the South Atlantic Blockading Squadron. In 1864, he helped William Tecumseh Sherman secure Savannah, Georgia.

Dahlgren's eldest son Charles Bunker Dahlgren (1839–1912), who had studied steam engineering, joined the U.S. Navy at the start of the Civil War and served with distinction, receiving several promotions and ending as the rank of captain. However, he declined offers to continue in federal service after the war. Among other incidents, Charles Dahlgren commanded the siege battery of 9-inch Dahlgren shell-guns which destroyed the powerful Confederate batteries at the Battle of Vicksburg, and served under his father during the blockade of Charleston.

Another of Dahlgren's sons, Colonel Ulric Dahlgren, was killed on March 2, 1864, in a cavalry raid on Richmond, Virginia, while carrying out an assassination plot against Jefferson Davis and the Confederate Cabinet. The plot became known as the Dahlgren Affair. The admiral was deeply troubled by Ulric's death and role in this event, as well as reports of the disrespectful treatment of the corpse before Richmond spymaster Elizabeth Van Lew secured its proper burial.

His brother William also spied on Confederate purchasing agents in England during the war. However, despite Radical Republican associations, John Dahlgren's younger brother Charles G. Dahlgren (1811–1888), a banker and slave owner, became a Confederate brigadier general, commander of the 3rd Brigade, Army of Mississippi, which he personally recruited and funded, until his troops' integration into the regular Confederate army and removal by Jefferson Davis in 1862.

== Personal life ==
Admiral Dahlgren had three sons and one daughter that survived childhood from his first marriage to Mary Clement Bunker (1839).

- Charles Bunker Dahlgren (1839–1912), was an engineer and captain in the Union Navy. After his father's death, he would write and present many technical papers on military weaponry, including the Dahlgren gun.
- Elizabeth Dahlgren (1840-1858), died of consumption.
- Ulric Dahlgren (1842–1864) was a soldier in the Union Army and was killed in an unsuccessful mission to liberate Federal prisoners in Libby Prison and Belle Isle.
- Paul Dahlgren (1846–1876), also in the army, died while serving as consul general in Rome.
- John B. Dahlgren (1847–1847)
- Eva Dahlgren (1848–1870)
- Lawrence Smith Dahlgren (1850–1851)

His first wife died in 1855 and in 1865, Dahlgren married his second wife, Madeleine Vinton, daughter of Congressman Samuel Finley Vinton and Romaine Madeleine Bureau, and the widow of Daniel Convers Goddard, first assistant secretary of the newly created U.S. Department of the Interior. Madeleine was a well-known author in her own right. Their children were:

- John Vinton Dahlgren (1868–1899), who married Elizabeth Wharton Drexel
- Eric Bernard Dahlgren Sr. (1866–1922), who married Lucy Wharton Drexel;
- Ulrica Dahlgren (1866–1925), who married Josiah Pierce, and was the grandmother of Romaine Dahlgren Pierce, wife of David Mountbatten, 3rd Marquess of Milford Haven.

== Final years and death ==
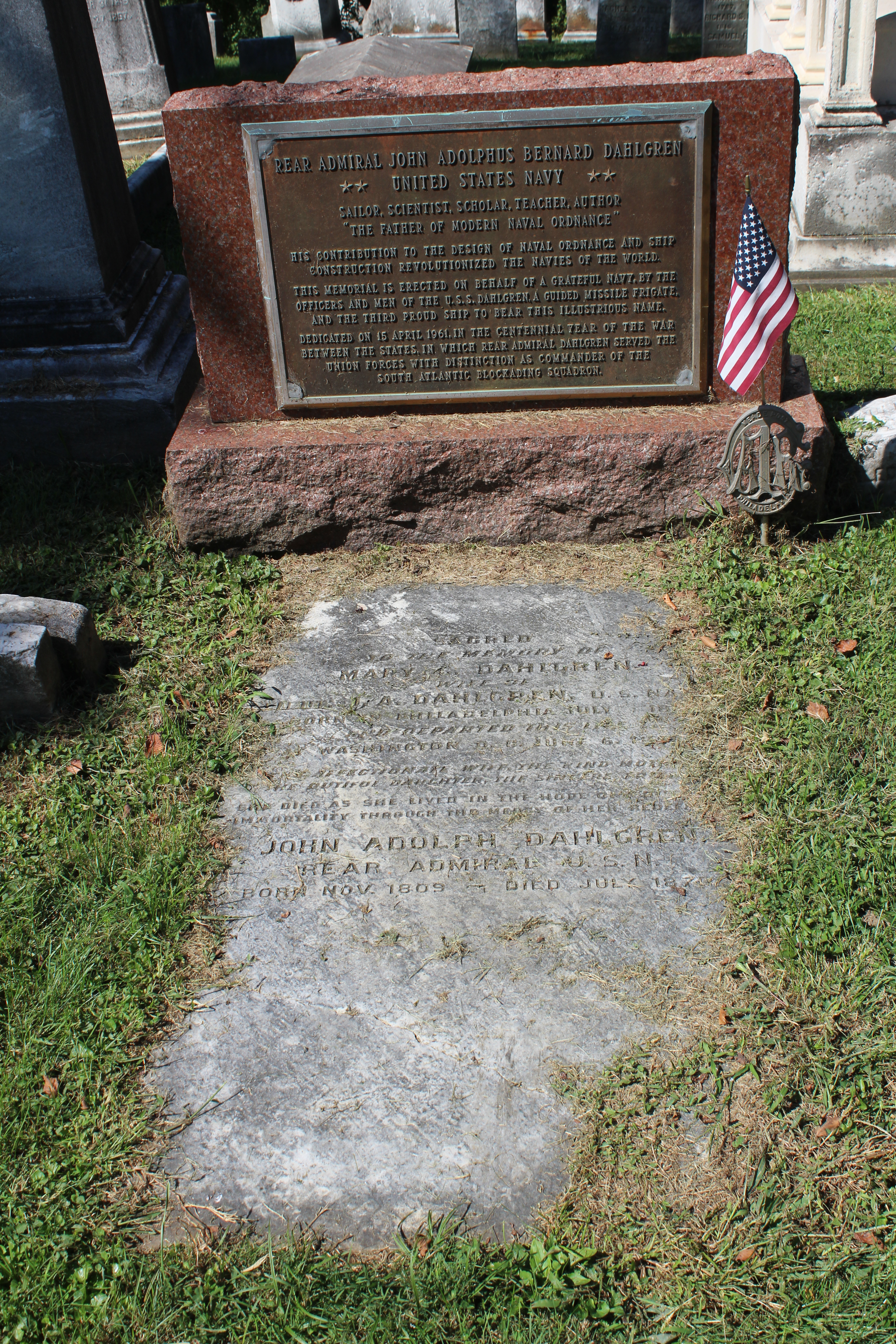
Dahlgren's tombstone in Laurel Hill Cemetery

Dahlgren took command of the South Pacific Squadron from Rear Admiral George F. Pearson in 1867. When he was relieved of the squadron's command in 1868, he returned to the Washington Navy Yard, where he again served as chief of the Bureau of Ordnance until 1869, and then as commandant of the yard until his death on July 12, 1870, at age 60.

He is buried at Laurel Hill Cemetery, Section L50 to 54, in Philadelphia, Pennsylvania.

== Legacy ==
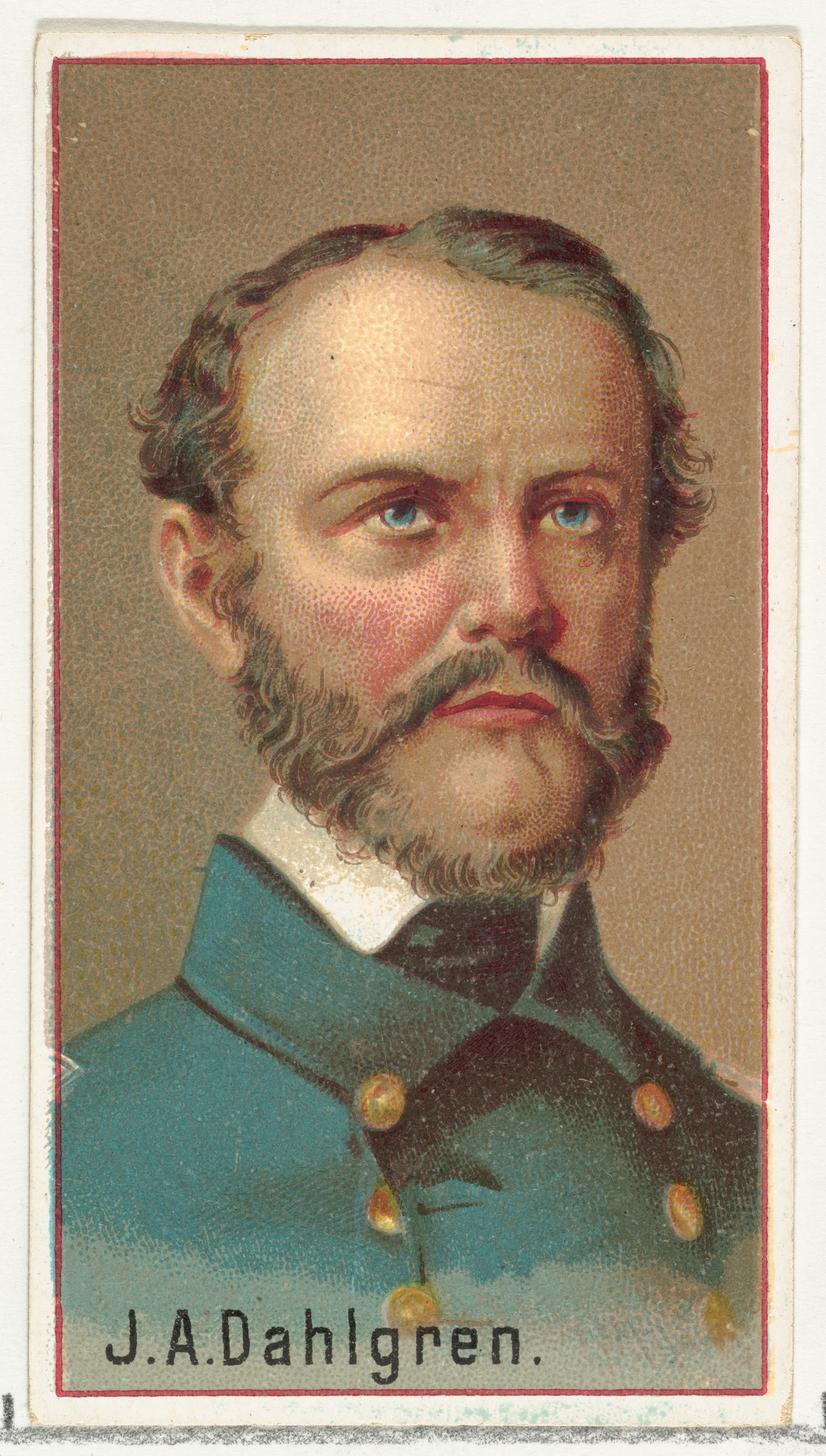
An 1888 color lithograph of Dahlgren from a series by Allen & Ginter Cigarettes

The Naval station in Dahlgren, Virginia, Dahlgren Hall at the United States Naval Academy in Annapolis, Maryland, several ships, Dahlgren, Illinois, and Dahlgren Township, Minnesota are all named for him

== Selected works ==
- Dahlgren, John A. (July 18, 2023). The System of Boat Armaments in the United States Navy: Reported To ... Bureau Of Ordnance And Hydrography (1852). ISBN 978-1020961946.
- Dahlgren, John A. (February 22, 2019). Shells and Shell Guns. ISBN 978-0469318120.
- Naval Percussion Locks and Primers

== See also ==
- Dahlgren Chapel (Maryland), built by Dahlgren's widow
- Naval Surface Warfare Center Dahlgren Division
- USS Dahlgren, named after Dahlgren
