= Drexel (name) =

Drexel is a surname and occasional given name. Notable people named Drexel include:

- Anthony Joseph Drexel (1826–1893), American banker, founder of Drexel, Morgan & Co.
- Anthony Joseph Drexel Biddle Sr. (1874–1948), American soldier, amateur boxer and writer
- Anthony Joseph Drexel Biddle Jr. (1897–1961), American diplomat and soldier
- Brittanee Drexel (born 1991), American high school student who disappeared in 2009
- Constance Drexel (1894–1956), a naturalized American journalist, and Nazi broadcaster
- Drexel Gomez (1937–2025), Bahamian Anglican bishop
- Elizabeth Wharton Drexel (1868–1944), American writer and socialite
- Francis Anthony Drexel (1824–1885), American banker
- Francis Martin Drexel (1792–1863), Austrian-American painter and banker, founder of Drexel & Co.
- Hans Drexel (1919–1962), German World War II soldier
- Helen Avis Drexel (1911–1974), American actress
- Íngrid Drexel (born 1993), Mexican road bicycle racer
- Jeremias Drexel (1581–1638), German Jesuit and professor
- John Drexel, American poet, critic, and editor
- John Armstrong Drexel (1891–1958), American aviation pioneer
- Joseph William Drexel (1833–1888), American banker, philanthropist, and book collector
- Katharine Drexel (1858–1955), American philanthropist, religious sister, and Roman Catholic saint
- Ruth Drexel (1930–2009), German actress and director
- Simone Drexel (born 1957), Swiss singer and songwriter
- Wiltrud Drexel (born 1950), Austrian alpine skier
