= Stonor (disambiguation) =

Stonor is a village in Oxfordshire, England.

Stonor may also refer to:

== People ==
- Edmund Stonor (1831–1912), British Catholic archbishop
- John Stonor (judge) (1281–1354), British justice
- Julia Camoys Stonor (born 1939), British author
- Oliver Stonor (1903–1987), English novelist, reviewer, translator, and man of letters.
- the family name of the Barons Camoys, beginning with the third baron:
  - Thomas Stonor, 3rd Baron Camoys (1797–1881)
  - Francis Stonor, 4th Baron Camoys (1856–1897)
  - Ralph Stonor, 5th Baron Camoys (1884–1968)
  - Sherman Stonor, 6th Baron Camoys (1913–1976)
  - Thomas Stonor, 7th Baron Camoys (1940–2023)
  - William Stonor, 8th Baron Camoys (born 1974)

== Other uses ==
- Stonor Park, in the village, ancestral home and seat of the Barons Camoys
- Stonor, Tasmania, a rural locality in Australia

== See also ==
- Stoner (disambiguation)
