= John R. Drexel =

American banker and socialite

- Born: September 9, 1863; Philadelphia, Pennsylvania, U.S.
- Died: May 18, 1935 (aged 72); New York, New York
- Occupations: Banker socialite
- Spouse: Alice Gordon Troth (m. 1886)
- Children: 4
- Parent(s): Anthony Joseph Drexel; Ellen B. Rozet
- Relatives: Anthony Joseph Drexel Jr. (brother); Alexander Van Rensselaer (brother-in-law); Francis Anthony Drexel (uncle); Joseph William Drexel (uncle); Katharine Drexel (cousin); Anthony Drexel Biddle Sr. (nephew); Francis Martin Drexel (grandfather)

John Rozet Drexel (March 3, 1863 – May 18, 1935) was an American banker and socialite.

== Early life ==
Drexel was born on March 3, 1863, in Philadelphia, Pennsylvania. He was the eldest surviving son, of nine children, born to Anthony Joseph Drexel (1826–1893) and Ellen (née Rozet) Drexel (1832–1891). Among his siblings were: Emilie Taylor Drexel, Frances Katherine Drexel, Mae E. Drexel, Sarah Rozet "Sallie" Drexel (the wife of Alexander Van Rensselaer), Anthony Joseph Drexel Jr., and George William Childs Drexel.

In 1871, his father founded Drexel, Morgan & Co with John Pierpont Morgan as his junior partner. His father also founded Drexel University in 1891. His maternal grandparents were Mary Ann (née Laning) Roset and John Roset, a Philadelphia merchant of French birth. His paternal grandparents were Austrian-born American banker Francis Martin Drexel and Katherine (née Hookey) Drexel.

== Career ==
After an education by tutors and in private schools, Drexel began working for his father's firm, Drexel & Co. in Philadelphia, and was made a partner. After a short time, he retired from the business and instead managed his inheritance.

=== Residences ===
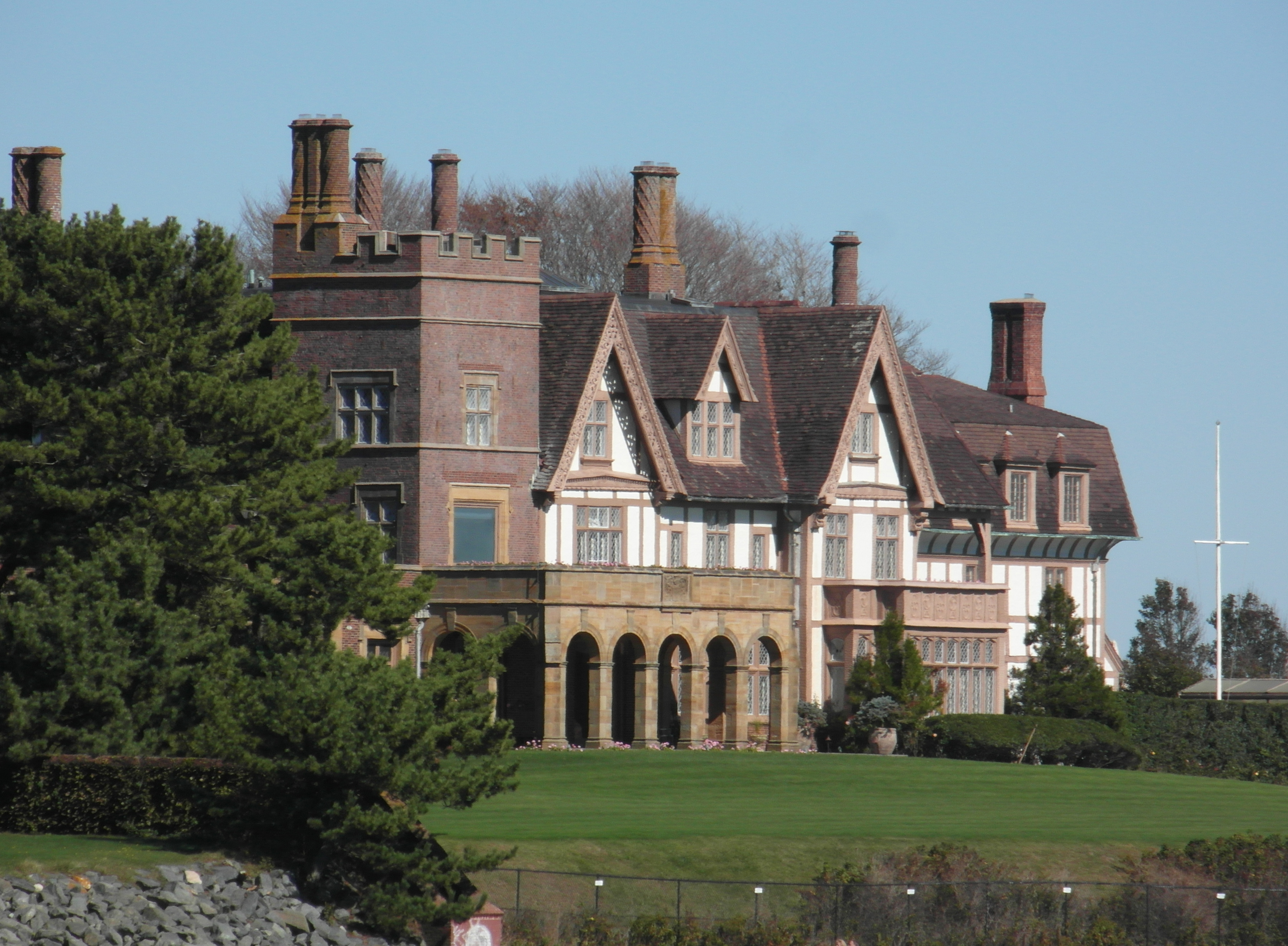
Fairholme, the Drexel villa in Newport

In 1901, the Drexels relocated to New York City and, in 1903, built a large limestone residence at 1 East 62nd Street and Fifth Avenue in New York City, (Note: To construct 1 East 62nd Street, the brownstones of Martin E. Green at 1 East 62nd Street and Prudence Boynton at 3 East 62nd Street were purchased and torn down providing a 42 feet wide plot for the construction of the Drexel house.) designed by Philadelphia architect Horace Trumbauer. (Note: After moving to New York City and while their home was being constructed, they leased Frederick W. Vanderbilt's mansion at the southeast corner of Fifth Avenue and 40th Street in 1901 while the Vanderbilts were away for the winter. The following season they leased the home of the late Samuel D. Babcock, at 636 Fifth Avenue at the 51st Street (today the International Building at Rockefeller Center).) In 1929, the Drexels sold their New York mansion was sold to 65-year old James Blanchard Clews, senior partner of the brokerage house Henry Clews & Co. (Note: After Clews' death in 1944, his heirs divided the building into upscale apartments and later residents included Ernest Hemingway and Joan Rivers.)

In Newport, Rhode Island, they built a modest cottage known as Cliff Lawn, which was later given to son John, after which they acquired and extensively remodeled, likely by Trumbauer, into a massive Tudor revival mansion called Fairholme at Ochre Point, down the street from Cliff Lawn. Fairholme had been designed in the Stick style by Frank Furness and built between 1874 and 1875 for Philadelphia arts patron and engineer Fairman Rogers. Fairholme was sold to Robert R. Young in 1942.

At the start of the Great Depression, the Drexel's relocate to Paris following their daughter's elopement with Captain Barrett. After several years at the Hotel Ritz, they bought a large townhouse at 34 Rue François Premier in Paris and filled it with French antique furniture. They also developed a large art collection which they built an addition to their Paris townhouse to house it. To accommodate the 40,000 flower beds his wife had purchased at auction, they purchased the home behind them and demolished it, allowing for a large garden to be constructed.

== Personal life ==
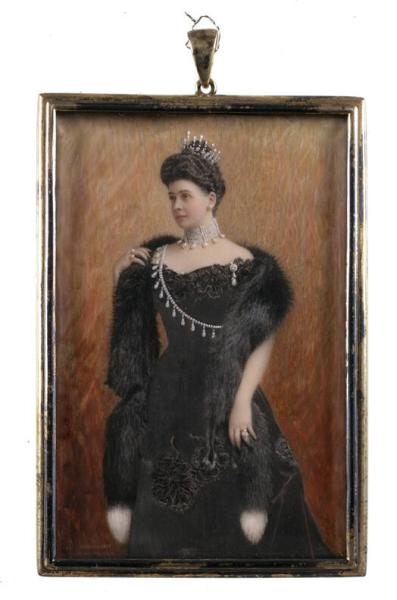
Portrait of Mrs. John R. Drexel Sr., by Albert Abendschein, c. 1895

On April 27, 1886, Drexel was married to Alice Gordon Troth (1865–1947) at St. James' Episcopal Church in Philadelphia by the Rev. Dr. Morton. She was a daughter of William Penn Troth and Clara Sharpless (née Townsend) Troth of Philadelphia. Together, they were the parents of four children:

- Lillian Mae Drexel (1889–1894), who died young.
- John Rozet Drexel Jr. (1890–1936), who married Elizabeth Hough Thompson (1896–1943), a daughter of James Beaton Thompson, in 1918. They divorced in 1924, and he married Jane Barbour, a daughter of John Robert Taliaferro Barbour and a descendant of President Zachary Taylor, in 1925.
- Alice Gordon Drexel (1892–1959), a debutante who eloped Captain William Barrett, of the Army Air Service, a son of Oregon State Senator William N. Barrett. They separated a year later.
- Gordon Preston Drexel (1895–1964), who never married and "passes most of his time traveling."

In 1903, his wife was a guest of King Edward VII and Queen Alexandra at a ball in Windsor Castle, and at luncheon at Ascot. Drexel owned the steam yacht Sultana, "but he never was the yachting enthusiast that his brother, the late Colonel Drexel, became. Acquaintances said that he seemed to be a man without hobbies or avocations."

Drexel died on May 18, 1935, at his residence in Paris from a stroke suffered immediately following the death of his brother Anthony. When John died in 1935, he left most of his estate to John Jr. and Alice. The estate within the jurisdiction of Philadelphia courts was $1,285,292. Upon his wife's death in 1947, she left most her estate to her grandson, John R. Drexel III, including millions in cash, jewels, gems, paintings, furniture, silverware, gold, personal affects, artwork, antiques, personal papers. He also inherited her Paris property, New York property, Newport property, Philadelphia property and a large trust.

=== Descendants ===
Through his son John Jr., he was a grandfather of John Rozet Drexel III (1919–2007), who married Noreen Stonor, a daughter of Ralph Stonor, 5th Baron Camoys (and his American wife Mildred Constance Sherman) of Stonor Park, (Note: Upon the death of Lady Camoys (née Mildred Constance Sherman) in 1943, Noreen and John inherited the Stonor's Newport residence, Stonor Lodge, which burnt down in 2016.) David Anthony Drexel (1927–2003), who married Joan Gripenberg (daughter of Georg Achates Gripenberg, the Finnish Minister to London, Sweden, and the United Nations), and Jane Barbour Drexel (1929–2008), who married Harry Marshall Vale Jr., and John Porteous II,

Through his daughter Alice, he was a grandfather of Edwin Gerald William Barrett (1920–1921), who died aged 10 months from meningitis.
