= Ralph Stonor, 5th Baron Camoys =

British aristocrat (1884–1968)

The Right Honourable The Lord Camoys
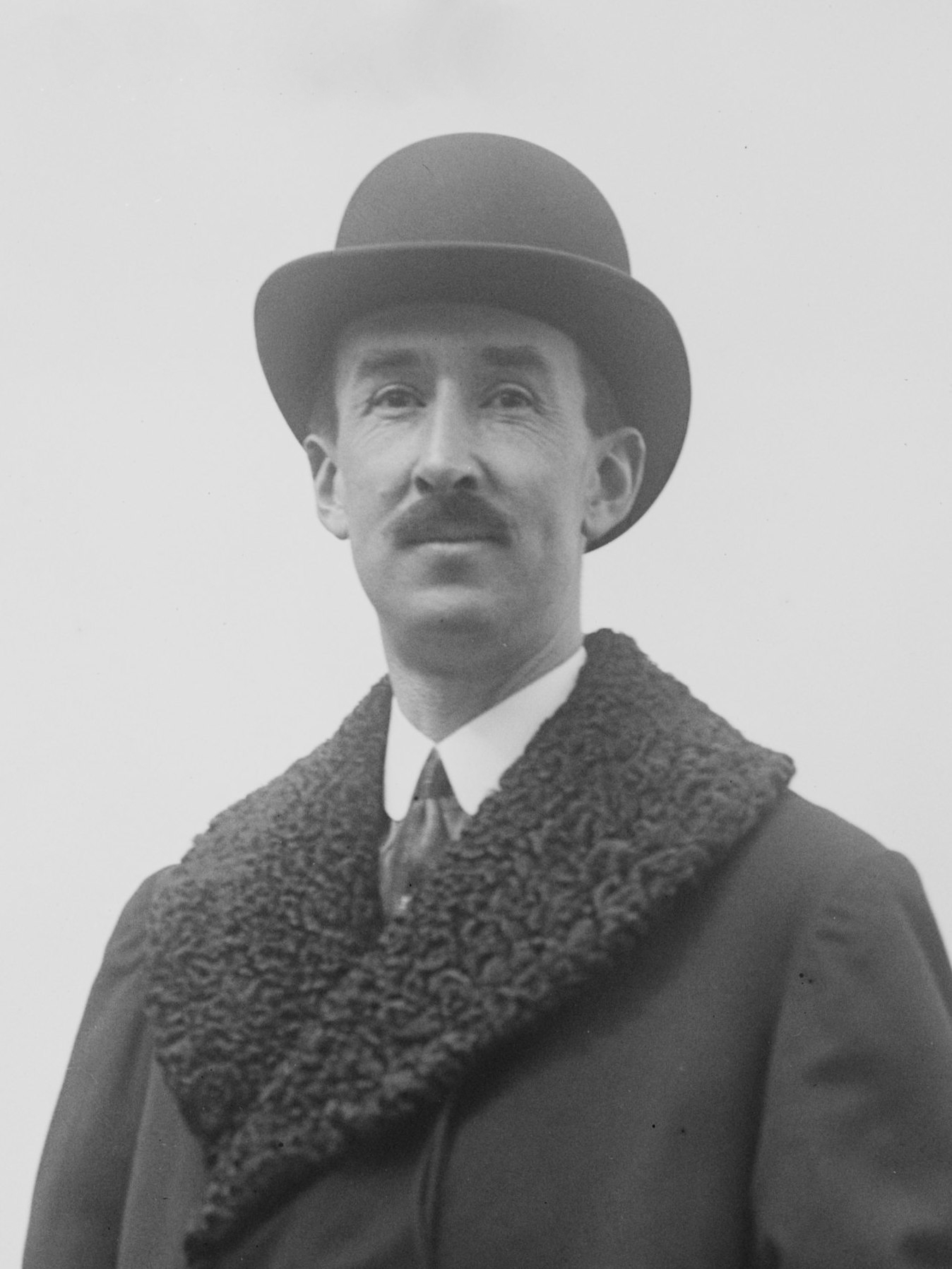
- Camoys, c. 1915–1920

Personal details
- Born: Ralph Francis Julian Stonor; 26 January 1884 Stonor Park, Henley-on-Thames, Oxfordshire
- Died: 3 August 1968 (aged 84) Stonor Lodge, Newport, Rhode Island
- Spouse: Mildred Constance Sherman (m. 1911; died 1961)
- Relations: Julia Camoys Stonor (granddaughter); Thomas Stonor, 7th Baron Camoys (grandson)
- Children: Sherman Stonor, 6th Baron Camoys; Hon. Nadine Pepys; Hon. Noreen Drexel
- Parent(s): Francis Stonor, 4th Baron Camoys; Jessie Philippa Carew
- Education: Balliol College, Oxford

Military service
- Years of service: 1940–1945
- Rank: Captain
- Unit: Buckinghamshire Home Guard
- Battles/wars: World War II

Ralph Francis Julian Stonor, 5th Baron Camoys (26 January 1884 – 3 August 1968) was an English aristocrat who married an American heiress.

== Early life ==
Stonor was born on 26 January 1884 at Stonor Park in Stonor, north of Henley-on-Thames in Oxfordshire, England. He was the son of Francis Robert Stonor, 4th Baron Camoys (1856–1897) and the former Jessie Philippa Carew. His father was the Lord-in-Waiting to Queen Victoria in 1886 and again from 1892 to 1895.

His paternal grandparents were Hon. Francis Stonor (second son of the Thomas Stonor, 3rd Baron Camoys) and Eliza Peel (a daughter of British prime minister Sir Robert Peel). His maternal grandfather was Robert Russell Carew of Carew & Co., Ltd. and his maternal aunt, Katherine Jane Carew, was married to Edward Bosc Sladen, the British army officer.

He was educated at the Oratory School in London and at Balliol College, Oxford and served as Attaché to Madrid.

== Career ==
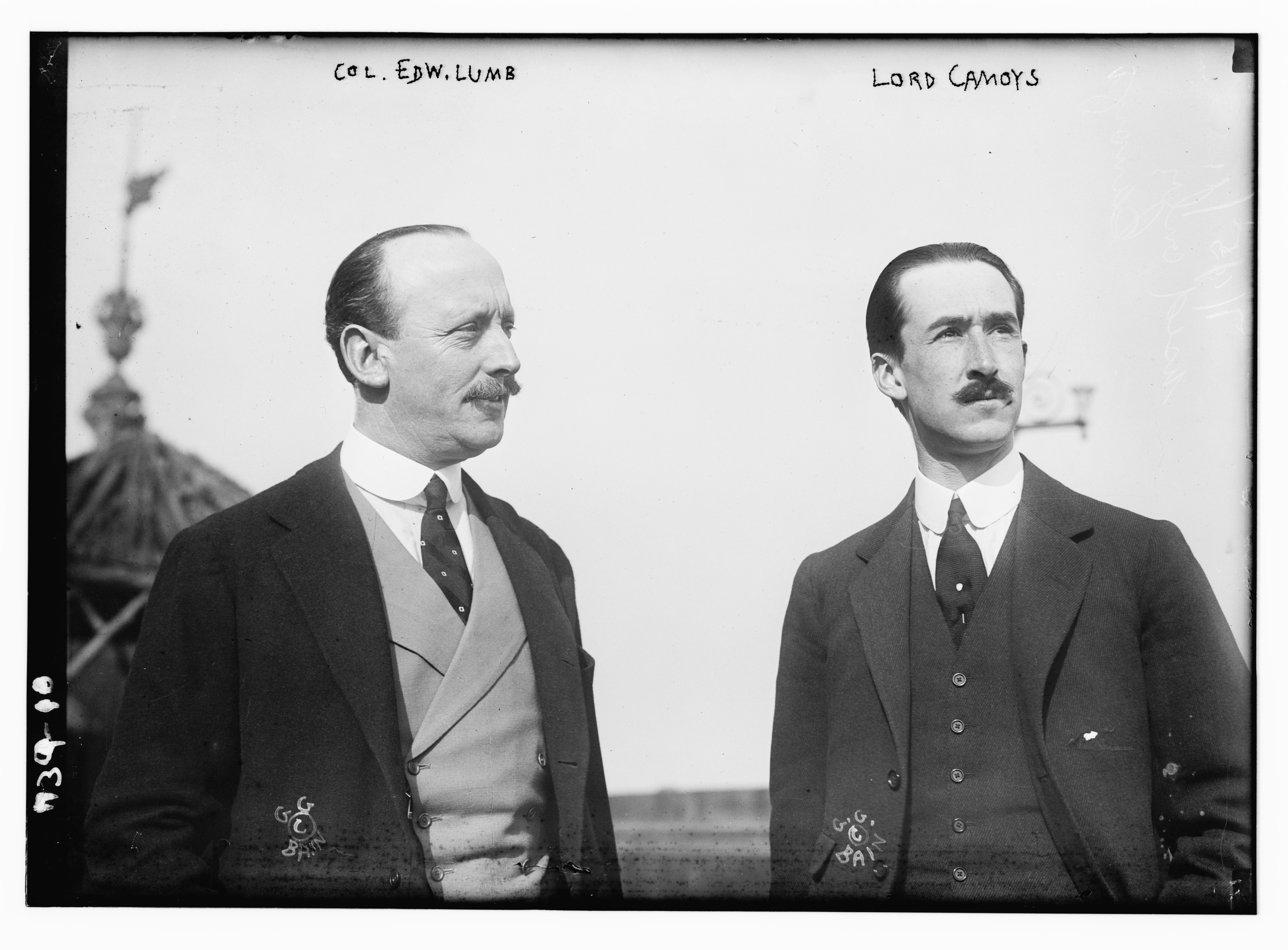
Col. Edward J. M. Lumb and Lord Camoys, 1911

Upon his father's death in 1897, he succeeded as Baron Camoys and was thereafter known as Lord Camoys.

Lord Camoys identified himself with the pure food reform movement and was elected chairman of the executive committee of the Pure Food and Health Society.

Lord Camoys was a captain in the Royal Flying Corp and, during World War II, was also a Captain with the Buckinghamshire Home Guard from 1940 to 1945.

== Personal life ==
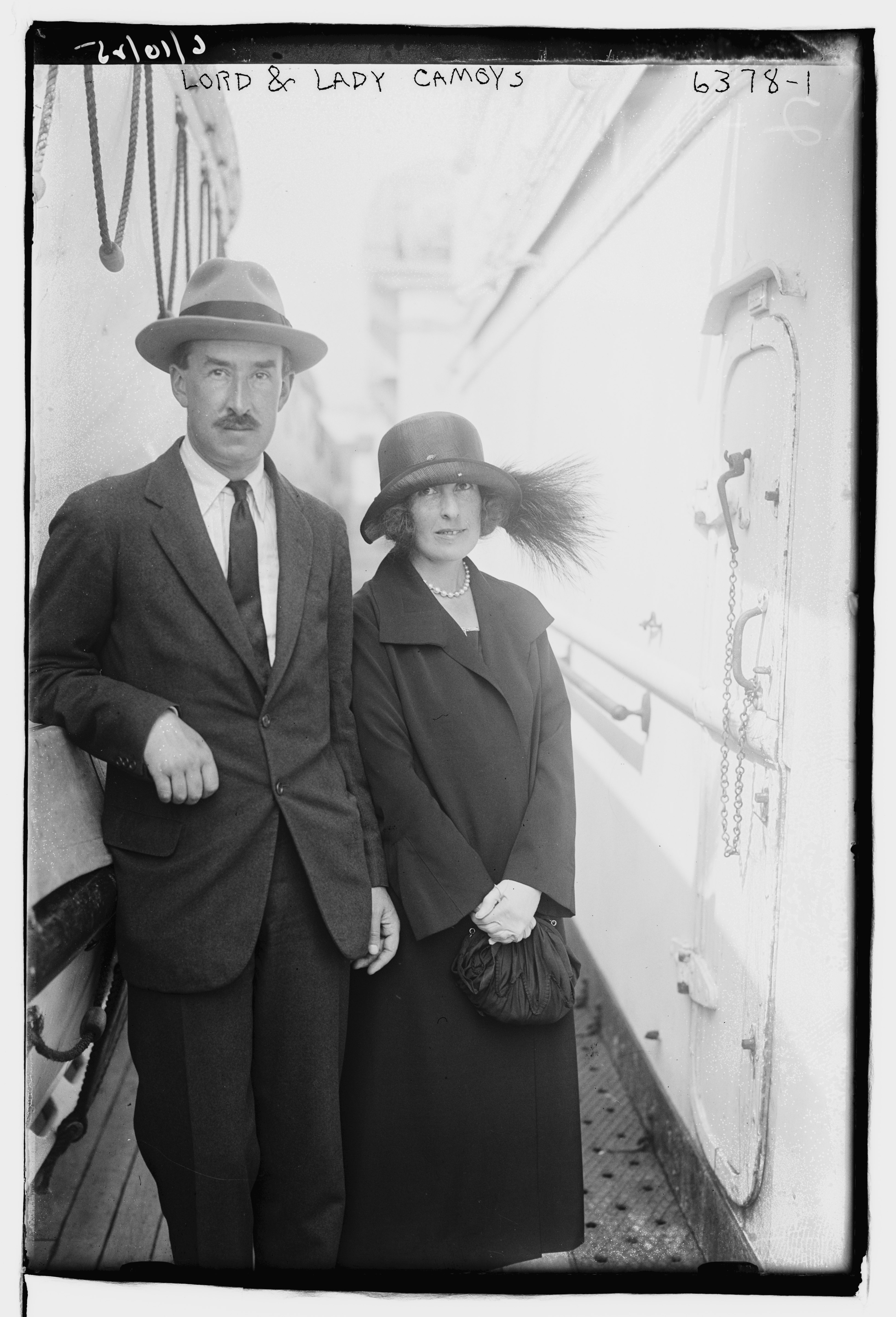
Lord & Lady Camoys

On 25 November 1911, Ralph was married to American heiress, Mildred Constance Sherman (1888–1961), the daughter of William Watts Sherman and the former Sophia Augusta Brown, a granddaughter of the founder of Brown University in Providence, Rhode Island. Together, they were the parents of the following children:

- Ralph Robert Watts Sherman Stonor (1913–1976), who succeeded his father to the barony. He married Jeanne Stourton (1913–1987), the third and youngest daughter of Captain Herbert Stourton, OBE (grandson of the 19th Baron Stourton), and his wife, Frances (daughter of the 4th Viscount Southwell).
- The Hon. Pamela Sophia Nadine Stonor (1917–2005) married Lt. Col. Charles Pepys, King's Own Yorkshire Light Infantry, a great-grandson of the 1st Earl of Cottenham, in South Africa, in 1941. They had no children.
- The Hon. Mildred Sophia Noreen Stonor (1922–2012) married American heir John Rozet Drexel III (1919–2007) in 1941. John was a grandson of John R. Drexel and great-grandson of Anthony Joseph Drexel.

Lord Camoys died at his American home, Stonor Lodge in Newport, Rhode Island (in the United States), on 3 August 1968. At his death, he had seven grandsons and three great-grandchildren.

=== Descendants ===
Through his son, he was the grandfather of The Hon. Julia Camoys Stonor (b. 1939), who married Donald Saunders in 1963; Thomas Stonor, 7th Baron Camoys (1940−2023), who married who Elisabeth Hyde Parker in 1966; The Honourable Georgina Stonor (b. 1941); The Honourable Harriet Stonor (b. 1943), who married Julian Cotterell in 1965; and The Honourable John Stonor (1946–1994), who died unmarried.

Through his youngest daughter, he was the grandfather of Pamela Drexel; John Rozet Drexel IV, who married to Mary Jacqueline Astor, daughter of John Jacob Astor VI and Gertrude Gretsch; and Noreen Drexel O'Farrell.

Peerage of England
Preceded by Francis Stonor	Baron Camoys; 1897–1968	Succeeded by Sherman Stonor
