= Francis Drexel =

Francis Drexel may refer to:

- Francis Anthony Drexel (1824–1885), Philadelphia banker
- Francis Martin Drexel (1792–1863), Philadelphia banker and artist
