= Alfonso P. Villa =

Investment banker and manufacturer

Count Alfonso Ireneo Pietro Villa de Villarampari (9 March 1875 – 5 March 1968) was an Italian-American industrialist and investment banker.

== Early life ==
Villa was born on 9 March 1875 in Villanova d'Asti in Northern Italy, which was then the Kingdom of Italy. He was a son of Carlo Francesco Villa (1825–1897). Among his siblings were Faustino Villa, Adolfo Villa, Augusto Villa, Silvio Villa and Vittoria Villa, who married Italian General, Count Ambrogio Clerici, the former aide-de-camp to the King Victor Emmanuel III who was Undersecretary of State for War under General Antonino Di Giorgio (the predecessor to Benito Mussolini).

In 1897, he received a degree from the University of Turin.

== Career ==
Villa served as president of A. P. Villa & Brothers Inc., silk importers based in Passaic, New Jersey. He was also the president and a director of its affiliates in Guangzhou, Japan, Lyon and Shanghai. He also served as a Manager of the Silk Association of America.

Villa later became a partner in the investment banking firm of Grayson M. P. Murphy & Co. (who had been senior vice president of Guaranty Trust). Villa served as a director of W. A. Harriman & Co., the Mechanics and Metals National Bank, the Park Union Foreign Banking Corporation, and the Manhattan Fire and Marine Insurance Company.

In 1910, Villa was decorated as a Chevalier of the Crown of Italy by the Italian king Victor Emmanuel III. In 1924, while in Italy during the summer, King Victor Emmanuel II conferred on him the title of Count, a former title of his family, which for years had been in abeyance, "in recognition of his services, in commerce, to Italy and America."

== Personal life ==
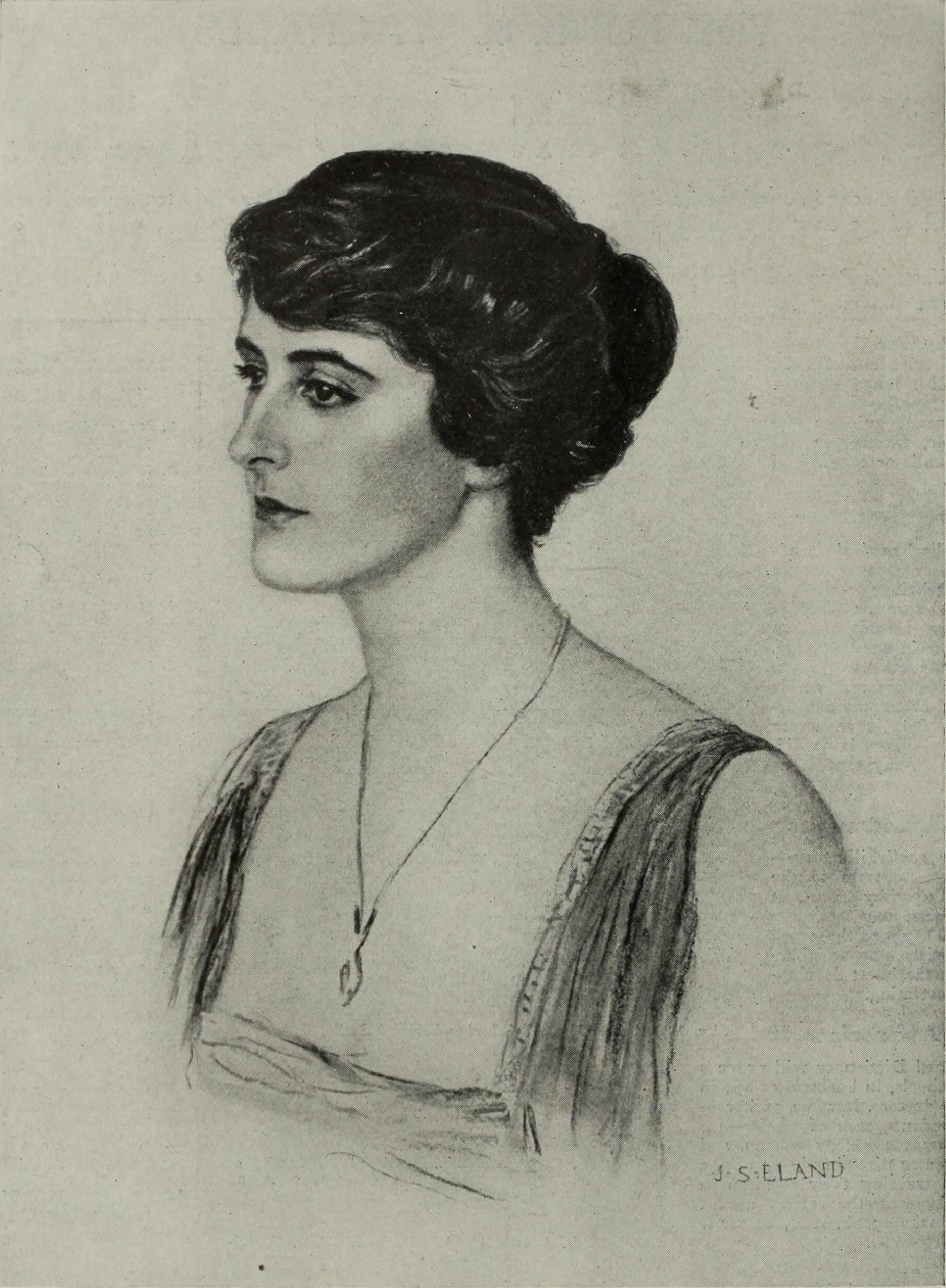
Charcoal portrait of Mrs. Alfonso P. Villa, c. 1923, Arts & Decoration, September 1923}

On January 20, 1915, Villa was married to Helen Rae Lippincott (1889–1956) at St. Patrick's Cathedral in New York City. She was a daughter of Emilie (née Rennert) Lippincott and Franklin Barclay Lippincott of Philadelphia. At the time of their wedding, Helen was living at the Holland House with her grandmother, Mme. Antonio de Roig, and her mother had remarried to Col. Henry Mapleson of the British Army. While they lived in New York City, they spent summers in Newport and winters in Rome. Together, they were the parents of five children, two sons and three daughters, including:

- Alfonso Pietro Villa (1916–1916), who died in infancy.
- Elena Teresa Villa (1917–1983), a 1935 debutante who married Robert Grant III, grandson of Judge Robert Grant (a close friend of Edith Wharton), in 1938.
- Consuelo Vittoria Lippincott Villa (1918–1973), a 1936 debutante who married banker John Taylor Hamilton II of Cedar Rapids, Iowa, grandson of U.S. Representative John Taylor Hamilton, in 1940.
- Anthony Lippincott Villa (1920–2001), who married Diana Blair Gambrill, a daughter of Richard Van Nest Gambrill of Vernon Court and granddaughter of C. Ledyard Blair, in 1945; he served as senior partner and chairman of the brokerage firm Jesup & Lamont.
- Francesca Lippincott Villa (1922–1995), a 1940 debutante who married Hugo Rutherfurd, a son of Winthrop Rutherfurd and Alice Morton Rutherfurd (daughter of former U.S. Vice President Levi P. Morton), in 1941.

In the United States, he became a member of the Lotos Club, the Manhattan Club, the Automobile Club of America, the Sleepy Hollow Country Club, and the Rumson Country Club.

After a long illness, the Countess died at the Irving Hotel in Southampton, on August 25, 1956. Count Villa died on 5 March 1968 at his home, 760 Park Avenue, in New York City. He was buried at Cimitero di Villanova d'Asti in the Villa family mausoleum.

=== Residences ===
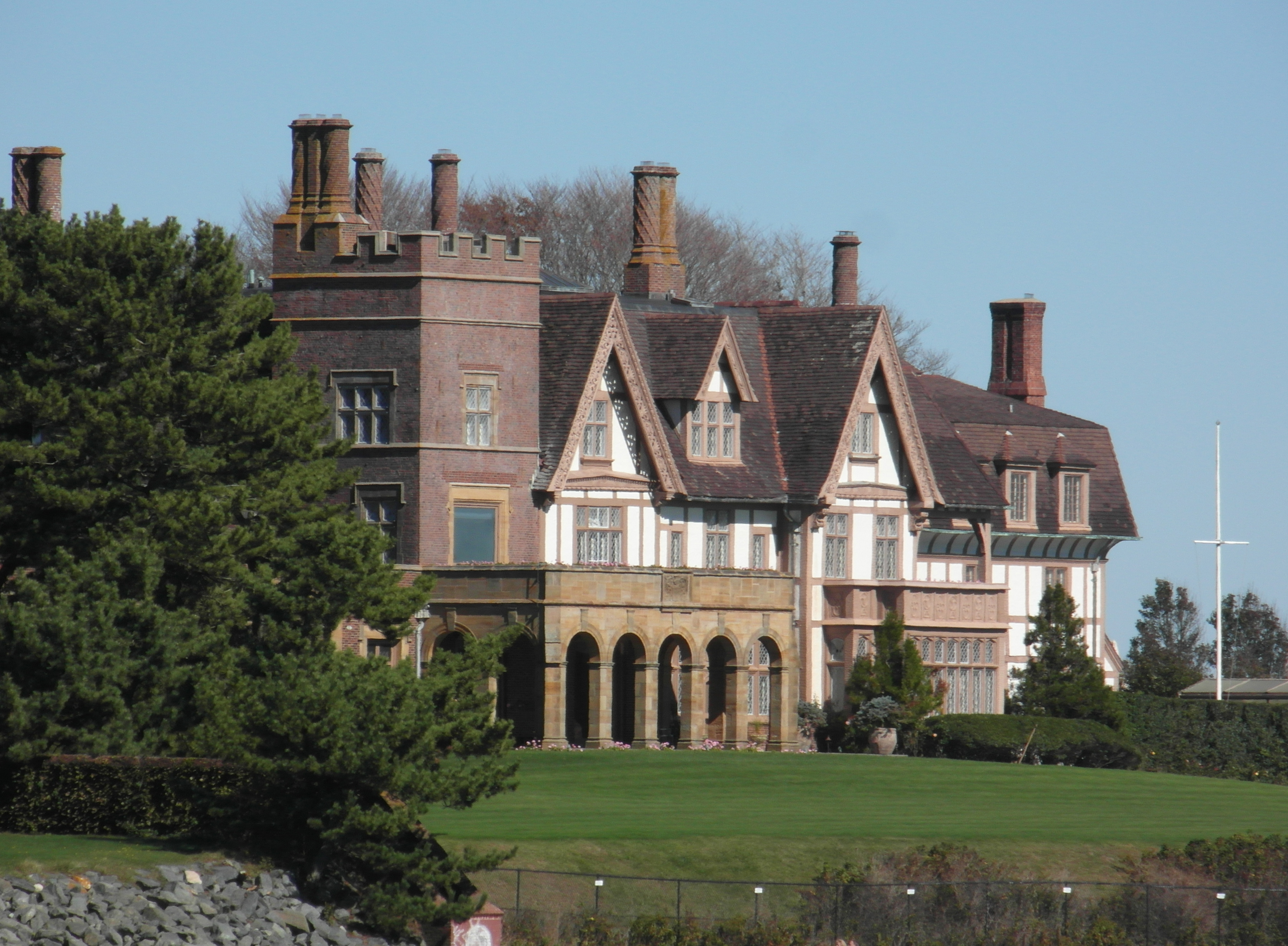
Fairholme, the Villa residence in Newport

In New York City, the Villas lived at 18 East 72nd Street, the former home of banker Felix M. Warburg and Frieda Schiff Warburg (a daughter of Jacob Schiff). In 1924, they entertained their friend, Prince Gelasio Caetani, the retiring Italian Ambassador to the United States, at their home. Their neighbors included Louis C. Tiffany, Oliver Gould Jennings, W. Bayard Cutting and Lewis Cass Ledyard. They later moved to 760 Park Avenue.

After spending a number of years in Southampton, New York where they had a house, in April 1930, the Villas acquired Fairholme in Newport, Rhode Island, the former residence of John R. Drexels with 425 feet ocean of frontage situated on Ruggles Avenue at Ochre Point, just south of the Vanderbilt's property, The Breakers. (Note: In 1934, the A.P. Villa Corporation of New York filed suit against Newport through the Board of Tax Assessors alleging that the tax assessment on Fairholme was excessive. The estate was assessed at $160,000 ($66,100 for the land and $94,000 for the buildings and improvements, and $20,000 on tangible personal property).) The Villas entertained extensively in Newport. In 1942, the Villas sold Fairholme to Robert R. Young for $38,000. Alfonso Villa also owned a castle in Italy in his native town of Villanova d'Asti.
