= John R. Drexel III =

John Rozet Drexel III (October 6, 1919 – April 13, 2007) was an American sportsman and clubman.

== Early life ==
Drexel was born in Manhattan on October 6, 1919. He was the only child of John Rozet Drexel Jr. (1890–1936), and, his first wife, Elizabeth Hough (née Thompson) Drexel (1896–1943), who married in 1918 and divorced in 1924. Shortly after his parents' divorce, his father married Jane Barbour, a daughter of John Robert Taliaferro Barbour and a descendant of President Zachary Taylor, in 1925. From his father's second marriage, he had two half-siblings, David Anthony Drexel (who married Joan Gripenberg, a daughter of G. A. Gripenberg, the Finnish Minister to London, Sweden, and the United Nations), and Jane Barbour Drexel (who married Harry Marshall Vale Jr., and John Porteous II).

His maternal grandparents were James Beaton Thompson. His paternal grandparents were Alice Gordon (née Troth) Drexel and John R. Drexel, the eldest surviving son of financier Anthony Joseph Drexel (founder of Drexel, Morgan & Co with John Pierpont Morgan). His aunt, Alice Gordon Drexel, was a debutante who eloped Captain William Barrett, of the Army Air Service, after which his grandparents relocated to Paris. His uncle, Gordon Preston Drexel, never married and spent "most of his time traveling."

Drexel spent much of his childhood in Neuilly, France, where his grandmother lived, and was educated at St. Mark's School in Southborough, Massachusetts before attending Harvard University, graduated in 1942.

== Career ==
Throughout most of his life, Drexel managed his family's finances and directed its philanthropic endeavors, focusing on local hospitals and animal shelters.

=== Club and society life ===
In New York City, he was a member of the New York Yacht Club, the Knickerbocker Club, Union Club and the River Club. He served on the board of the Good Samaritan Hospital in Palm Beach and on the boards of many clubs, including Spouting Rock Beach Association, Clambake Club and the Reading Room (all in Newport); the Bath and Tennis Club and Everglades Club (both in Palm Beach); and the Jupiter Island Club in Hobe Sound.

== Personal life ==
After first meeting at Tuxedo Park, Drexel was married to the Hon. Mildred Sophia Noreen Stonor (1922–2012) at St. James Protestant Episcopal Church in New York on January 11, 1941. the youngest daughter of Mildred Constance Sherman (a daughter of William Watts Sherman) and Ralph Stonor, 5th Baron Camoys, of Stonor Park. Together, they were the parents of:

- Pamela Noreen Drexel (b. 1943), who married stockbroker Bradford Hastings Walker, a stepson of James A. Burden III, in 1966.
- John Rozet "Nick" Drexel IV (b. 1945), who married Pamela Braga, a daughter of sugar merchant B. Rionda Braga, in 1969. After their 1976 divorce, she married J. Carter Brown and he married Mary Jacqueline "Jackie" Astor, a daughter of John Jacob Astor VI and, his second wife, Gertrude Gretsch, in 1984.
- Noreen Elizabeth Mildred Drexel (b. 1961), who married lawyer William John O'Farrell in 1990.

The Drexels lived in New York City, Palm Beach, and Newport, Rhode Island. The Duke of Windsor and his wife, Wallis, Duchess of Windsor, were frequent guests at the Drexels' homes. Upon the death of his mother-in-law, Lady Camoys, in 1943, they inherited the Stonor's Newport residence, Stonor Lodge, which burnt down in 2016. His wife helped restore Cardines Field in Newport. In 1999, she received an Honorary Doctorate of Humane Letters from Salve Regina in 1999.

Drexel died of heart-failure at his home in Newport on April 13, 2007. His widow died in Newport on November 6, 2012, after suffering a stroke.

=== Descendants ===
Through his son Nick, he was a grandfather of Nicholas Astor Drexel (b. 1987), whose godparents included John Astor, 3rd Baron Astor of Hever and Lady Hever (the former Fiona Diana Lennox-Harvey).
