= Thomas Stonor =

Thomas Stonor may refer to:

- Thomas Stonor (died 1431), English knight of the shire for Oxfordshire
- Thomas Stonor, 3rd Baron Camoys, British peer and politician
- Thomas Stonor, 7th Baron Camoys, British peer, banker and Lord Chamberlain
