= Robert R. Young =

American financier and industrialist

- Born: Robert Ralph Young; February 14, 1897; Canadian, Hemphill County; Texas, USA
- Died: January 25, 1958 (aged 60); Palm Beach, Florida
- Education: University of Virginia
- Occupations: Financier; New York Central Railroad
- Years active: 1916–1958
- Spouse: Anita Ten Eyck O'Keeffe (m. 1916)
- Children: Eleanor "Cookie" Young
- Parent(s): David John and Mary Arabella Moody Young

Robert Ralph Young (February 14, 1897 – January 25, 1958) was an American financier and industrialist. He is best known for leading the Chesapeake and Ohio Railway and the New York Central Railroad during and after World War II. He was a brother-in-law of the famous western painter, Georgia O'Keeffe.

Because of his initials, R.R. Young was often labeled "Railroad" Young. He was otherwise known as the "Populist of Wall Street", or, as his press agent encouraged journalists to call him, "The Daring Young Man of Wall Street". He regarded himself as a crusader against the mismanagement of railroads by banking interests. Young's most famous advertising slogan was "A hog can cross the country without changing trains – but you can't."

Despite his vocal criticisms, at the railroads he led, Young inaugurated many forward-looking advances in technology that have ramifications to the present. He was one of the first railroad executives to introduce high-speed diesel powered passenger trains which utilized lightweight equipment. He was also involved with the first large-scale railroad computer system, as well as diversification of freight traffic and development and implementation of larger and better freight cars of all types.

== Early life ==
Young was born on February 14, 1897, in Canadian, Hemphill County, Texas. He was the son of David John Young and Mary Arabella (née Moody) Young. His maternal grandfather was Robert Moody, builder and owner of the Moody Hotel, who is crediting with bringing banking to Oklahoma. He was educated at Culver Military Academy in Indiana and at the University of Virginia.

== Career ==
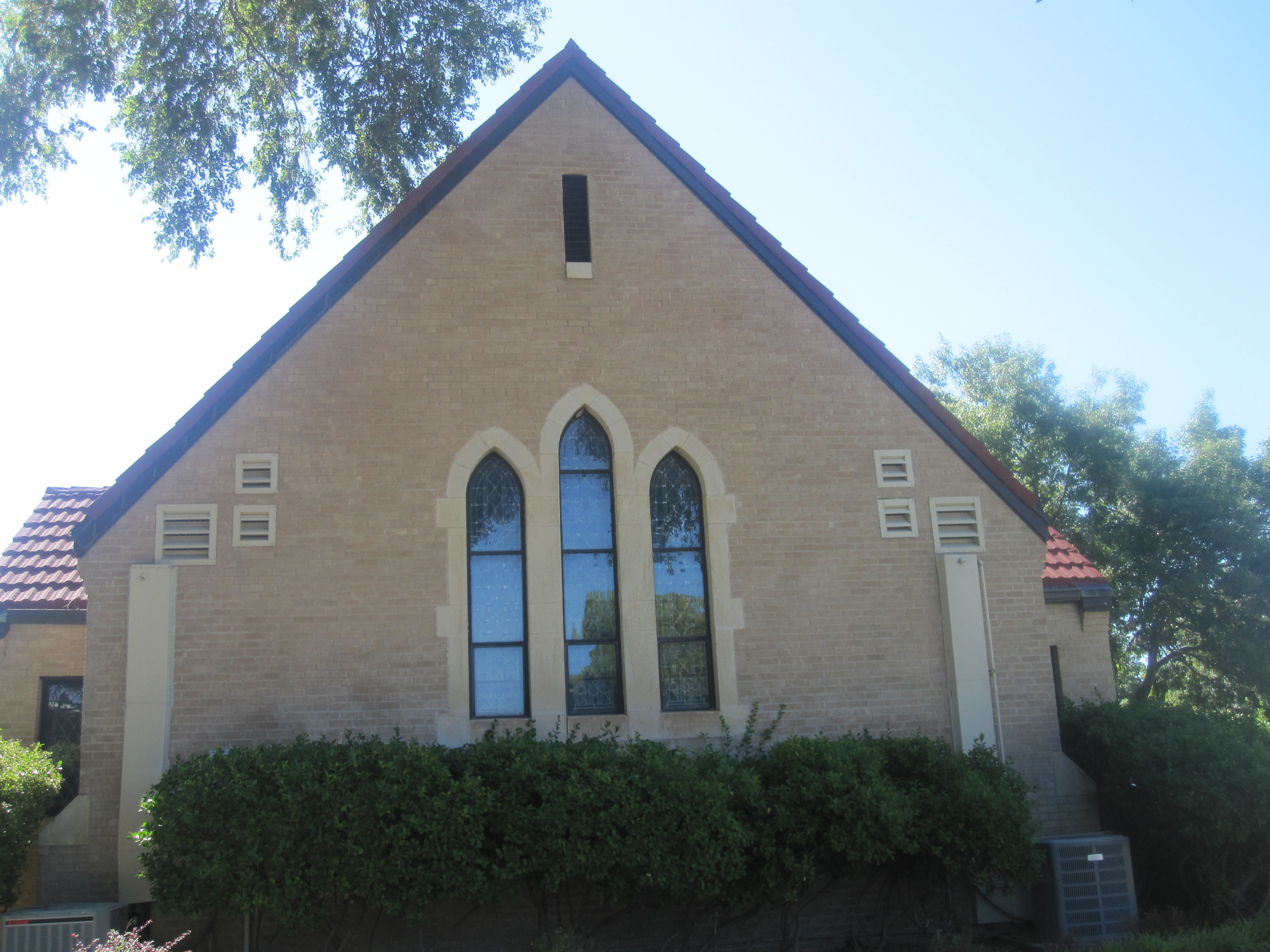
Young was a long-time member of the Presbyterian Church in Canadian, Texas.

=== Early career ===
Young took a job as a powder-cutter at the E. I. DuPont gunpowder plant at Carneys Point, New Jersey.

At DuPont, Young worked his way up to the treasurer's office, where he learned much about finance and advertising. By 1920, he had left DuPont and speculated in securities for a short time.

Young joined General Motors (GM) in 1922 and was made assistant treasurer in 1928. He soon became associated with GM head John J. Raskob, and left GM to handle Raskob's finances, when Raskob, who though a former Republican had been chairman of the Democratic National Committee, took a sabbatical to manage Al Smith's presidential campaign against Herbert C. Hoover.

Early in 1929, Raskob vehemently disagreed with Young's predictions of a stock market crash, and the two men parted company. Subsequently, Young netted a fortune selling stocks short.

In 1931, Young formed a brokerage partnership with Frank Kolbe and bought a seat on the New York Stock Exchange in order to speculate in stocks.

=== Film ===
Young acquired First Division Pictures in 1935, a distributor based in five cities in the Eastern United States, and hired future United Artists chairman Robert S. Benjamin as a lawyer. He expanded his film interest into laboratory work, as an affiliate of DuPont, national distribution and financing productions. In 1943 he acquired Producers Releasing Corporation, a B-movie production company, also known as PRC Pictures. In 1947, PRC was sold to Eagle-Lion Films.

Young continued to own Pathé Laboratories, a motion picture processing laboratory.

=== Chesapeake and Ohio Railway ===
In 1942, in alliance with Allan P. Kirby, a retail merchant, Young owned a controlling interest in the Alleghany Corporation, a railroad holding company previously owned by the Cleveland-based Van Sweringen family, which controlled the Chesapeake and Ohio Railway, Pere Marquette Railroad, and other railroad properties.

By the end of World War II, C&O was poised to help America during its rapid growth over the following decades, and by the mid-century, it was a line of national importance. It became more so, at least in the public eye, through Young, who became "the gadfly of the rails." He challenged old methods of financing and operating railroads, and inaugurated many advances in technology that have ramifications to the present day.

As chairman of the board of the C&O, Young launched a well-publicized campaign for the modernization of railroad passenger service. He was one of the first railroad executives to introduce lightweight, high-speed diesel passenger trains.

He served as a delegate from Rhode Island to the Republican National Convention in 1944.

In 1945, Young and Cyrus S. Eaton assembled $43,000,000 in a bid to purchase the Pullman Company operating pool, in the wake of a court decision that forced Pullman to divest that portion of its business. Their bid ultimately failed when a Philadelphia court, acting on recommendations from the ICC, awarded the railcar operations to a consortium of the large railroads.

Young changed the C&O's herald (logo) to "C&O for Progress" to embody his ideas that C&O would lead the industry to a new day. He installed a well-staffed research and development department, which came up with ideas for passenger service that are thought to be futuristic even now, and for freight service that would challenge the growth of trucking. Fortune magazine wrote, "Young has an almost endless inventory of ideas, some pneumatic and some substantial, about passenger service. He believes that the railroads could double any previous passenger revenues if they put out a good product and merchandised it well..."

During the Young era and subsequently, C&O was headed by Cyrus S. Eaton and Walter J. Tuohy, under whose control the "For Progress" theme continued, though in a more muted way after the departure of Young. During that time, C&O installed the first large computer system in railroading, developed larger and better freight cars of all types, switched (reluctantly) from steam to diesel motive power, and diversified its traffic, which had already occurred in 1947 when it merged Pere Marquette, of Michigan and Ontario, Canada, which had been controlled by the C&O since Van Sweringen days, into the system. The PM's huge automotive industry traffic, taking raw materials in and finished vehicles out, gave C&O some protection from the swings in the coal trade, making merchandise traffic 50% of the company's haulage.

Mr. Young was jointly awarded the inaugural Horatio Alger Award for initiative and excellence in 1947.

=== New York Central ===
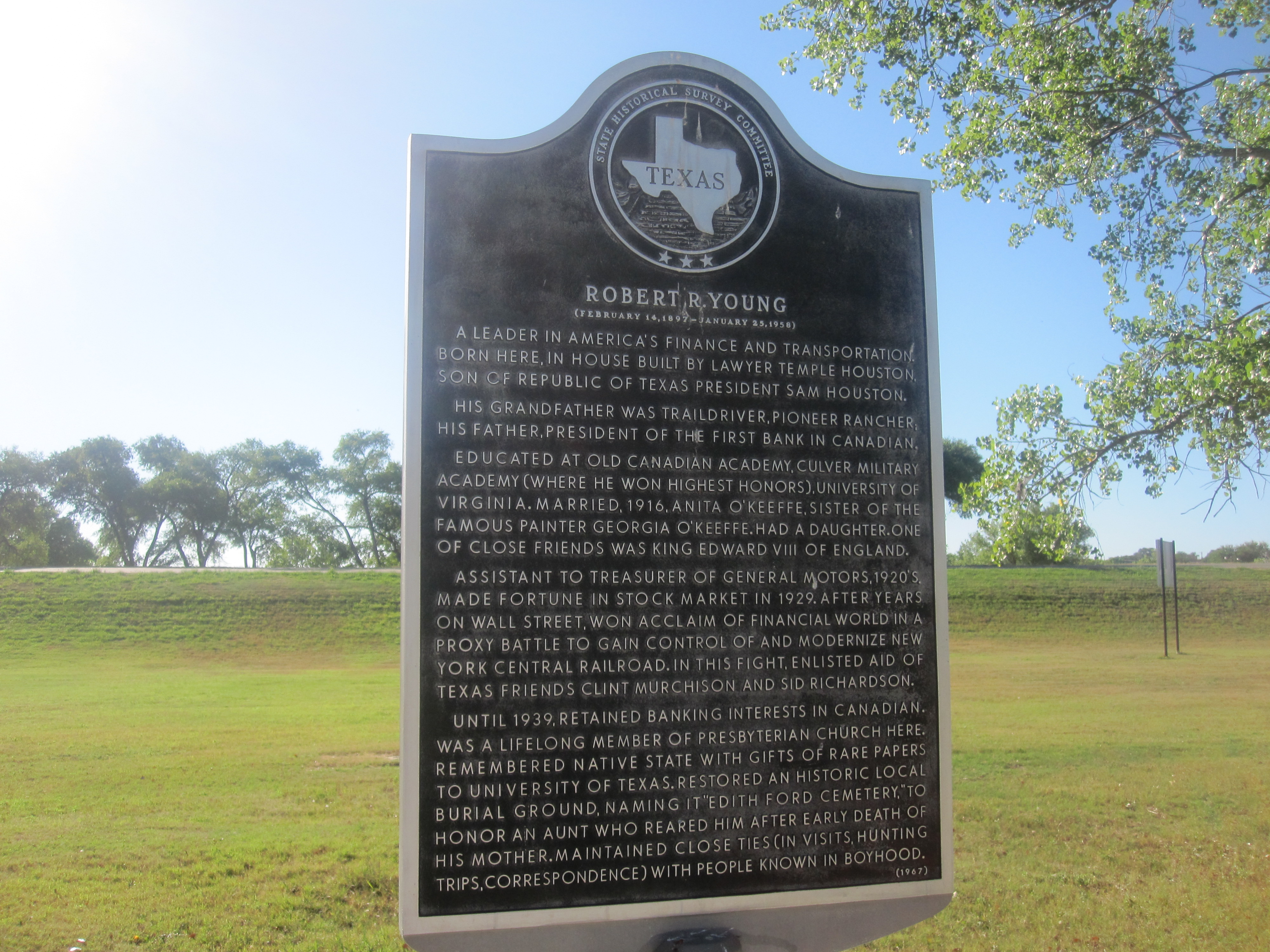
Young is honored with an historical marker near the Canadian River in his hometown of Canadian, Texas.

In the early 1950s, Young turned his attention to the New York Central Railroad. In 1954, after a long proxy struggle and with the aid of Clint Murchison Sr. and Sid Williams Richardson, Young gained control of the NYC and became the chairman of its board.

The dreams of Young and innovative Alfred E. Perlman, whom he selected to become president of the NYC, to form a true transcontinental line were frustrated by antitrust suits and by lack of interest on the part of the western lines to merge with the nearly bankrupt NYC. Many of Young's friends and smaller investors lost money as NYC stock prices fell.

== Personal life ==
On April 27, 1916, he married Anita Ten Eyck O'Keeffe (1892–1985), sister of Georgia O'Keeffe and artist Ida O'Keeffe. Her parents, Francis Calyxtus O'Keeffe and Ida (née Totto) O'Keeffe, were Wisconsin dairy farmers. Her maternal grandfather, George Victor Totto, was a Hungarian count who came to the United States in 1848. Robert and Anita had one daughter who became one of the much-publicized "Glamour Debutantes" of the Great Depression-era:

- Eleanor "Cookie" Young (1912–1941), who married Robert Ogden "Bunty" Bacon in early 1939. They divorced in December 1939, and she died in 1941 in a plane crash with Nicholas Embiricos.

Among his circle of friends were the Duke and Duchess of Windsor and Secretary of the Navy James Forrestal. Young maintained offices and an apartment in New York City. However, he preferred to do most of his office work in the privacy of the den of his mansion at Newport, Rhode Island. After renting Beechwood for a number of years from Vincent Astor, he bought Fairholme, the former John R. Drexel estate, from Count and Countess Alfonso P. Villa (after Astor sold Beechwood to Allene Tew and her fifth husband, Count Pavel de Kotzebue). In 1946, the Youngs purchased the 200-acre former McCorrie Farm from Mrs. Howard G. Cushing, the 45-acre Anthony Farm and the 185-acre Oakland Farm in Portsmouth, Rhode Island, the former estate of Gov. and Mrs. William Henry Vanderbilt III. Oakland Farm was sold and divided into housing lots by the end of the 1940s.

=== Death ===
On January 25, 1958, Young, who had suffered from depression for more than fifteen years, took his own life with a shotgun at The Towers, his winter mansion in Palm Beach, Florida. After his death, his widow razed the mansion and built a new one, Montsorrel. The property was sold to Nelson Peltz after Anita's death.

He is interred in St. Mary's Episcopal Churchyard in Portsmouth, Rhode Island. Oddly, Young had helped to restore an old cemetery in Canadian, Texas, which was renamed in honor of his aunt, Edith Ford, who had helped to rear him after the early death of his mother. That graveyard is today known as the Edith Ford Cemeteries.

== See also ==
- List of railroad executives
