= Francis M. Drexel Memorial Fountain =

Public artwork in Chicago, Illinois, U.S.

- The fountain in 2026
- Medium: Bronze sculpture; granite (base); concrete (basin)
- Subject: Francis Martin Drexel
- Location: Chicago, Illinois, U.S.; 41.8019°N 87.6045°W

The Francis M. Drexel Memorial Fountain (also known as the Francis M. Drexel Monument, or simply Drexel Monument or Washington Drexel Fountain) is a 1881 fountain and sculpture by Henry Manger in Drexel Square near Washington Park in Chicago, Illinois, United States. The work was cast in 1882 and dedicated in 1883. It features a bronze sculpture depicting Francis Martin Drexel on a granite base in a concrete fountain basin.
