= Fairholme (Newport, Rhode Island) =

Coordinates: 41.467990°N 71.299248°W

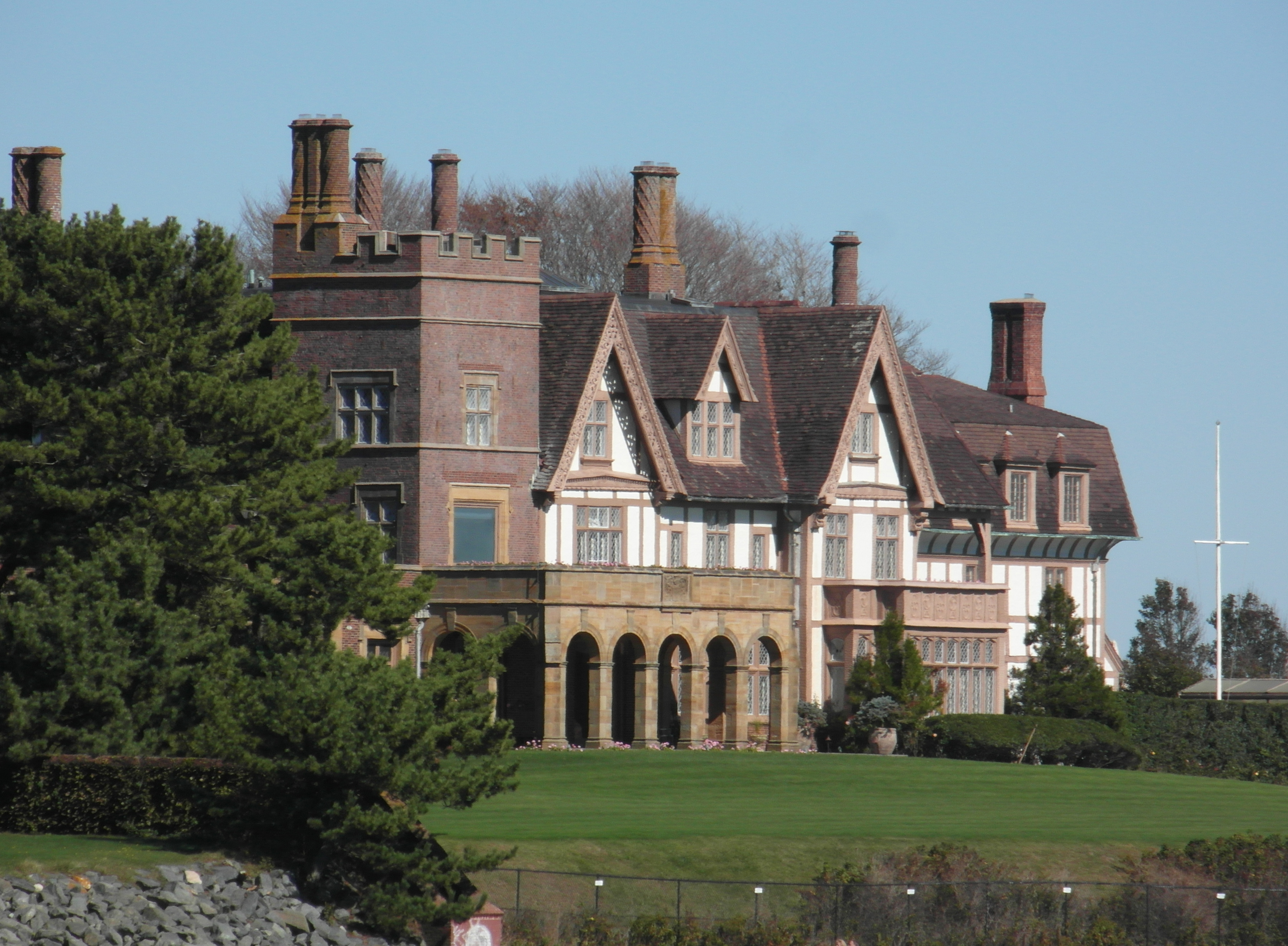
- Fairholme in 2012

General information
- Architectural style: Tudor Revival
- Location: 237 Ruggles Avenue, Newport, Rhode Island, United States
- Year built: 1874–1875
- Renovated: 1896

Design and construction
- Architect: Frank Furness

Renovating team
- Architect: Peabody & Stearns

Fairholme is a Tudor Revival historic mansion in Newport, Rhode Island designed by Frank Furness and built by Furness & Hewitt in 1874–1875 for Fairman Rogers.

== History ==
One of the many "cottages" built during the Gilded Age on beachfront property in the Newport area, it is located on a parcel of 4.3 acres near the eastern end of Ruggles Avenue with an ocean frontage of 425 feet. Fairholme was completely remodeled in 1896 by Peabody & Stearns for John R. Drexel. At some point, Horace Trumbauer added a ballroom to the house. After passing through the hands of Count Alfonso P. Villa, who acquired it from Mrs. Drexel in 1930, during the period when the rich were impacted by high tax rates, the house was sold to Robert R. Young for $38,000 in 1942.

It was owned by Palm Beach resident John Noffo Kahn, an heir to the Annenberg publishing fortune.

The Gilded Age estate was on the market for $16,900,000. It is located on Ochre Point, south of The Breakers on the south side of Ruggles Avenue between the neighboring mansions of Midcliffe and Angelsea. The stables on Ruggles Avenue, historically used as the gardener's cottage, was acquired by Salve Regina University in 1991 and converted to a residence hall, Jean and David W. Wallace Hall.

It was bought by American businessperson Doug Manchester in the summer of 2015, and subsequently sold a year later, in 2016 for $16.1MM.

It remains privately owned as of 2025.
