= John D. Lankenau =

German-American businessman and philanthropist

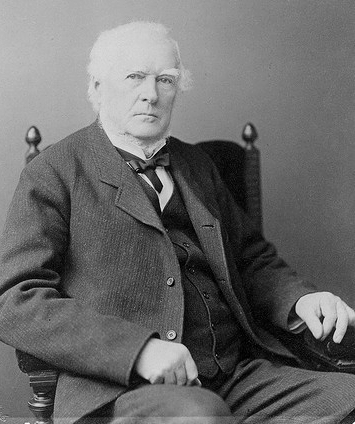
John Dietrich Lankenau (date unknown)

John Dietrich Lankenau (1817–1901) was a German-American businessman and philanthropist, an executor of financier Francis Martin Drexel, and the namesake of Lankenau Medical Center. Some sources give his middle name as Diederich or Diedrich.

== Biography ==
Born on March 18, 1817, in Bremen, Germany, Lankenau attended Bremen Business College. He took a job with a German dry goods importer, and then, in 1835, emigrated to Philadelphia to represent the company in America. He eventually became a partner in the German firm and earned a "large fortune."

In 1848, Lankenau married Mary Johanna Drexel (1822–1873), a daughter of the wealthy Philadelphia financier Francis Martin Drexel, who eventually named his son-in-law one of the executors of his will. After Francis' death in 1863, managing the enormous estate would partially occupy Lankenau for the rest of his life. John and Mary had two children, who died between 1873 and 1882.

Lankenau retired in 1865 and sold his mercantile firm.

Following his father-in-law, who served as Chief Contributing Treasurer of the German Hospital of the City of Philadelphia, Lankeau served as a hospital trustee in 1866–69, and then hospital president until his death. When the hospital sought to expand in 1884, Lankenau sought money from his brother-in-law, Anthony Joseph Drexel, who agreed on the condition that Lankenau will donates his art collection to Drexel University. Lankenau agreed, and the university eventually received works appraised at $150,000 ($5,805,000 today), including paintings of the Barbizon School by Charles-François Daubigny (1817–1878) and Jules Dupré (1811- 1889) and by artists of the Düsseldorf Academy, including Andreas Achenbach (1815–1910) and Oswald Achenbach (1827–1905).

Also in 1884, Lankenau arranged for seven deaconesses to come from Germany to run the hospital's administration and nursing corps. "This opened the gates for a flood of deaconesses to come and provide care in Philadelphia, Baltimore and Omaha," wrote one Lutheran-history site. "From the 1930s to the early 1950s, deaconesses from the Philadelphia Motherhouse served at Lankenau Hospital, the Philadelphia Children's Hospital, the Mary J. Drexel Home for the Aged, the Lankenau School for Girls, ministries in the Virgin Islands, parishes and many more sites."

After Mary died in 1873, Lankenau established — with the hospital deaconesses' help — the Mary J. Drexel Home for Aged and Homeless Patients of the German Hospital, a nursing home today known as the Mary J. Drexel Home. The organization later opened a girls' school, called first "The School for Girls of the Mary J. Drexel Home" and renamed in 1910 "The Lankenau School for Girls". In June 1942, the school bought a 30-room manor house and a gatehouse on eight acres from the estate of William G. Warden, a son of a founder of Atlantic Refining Company, and moved to 3201 West School House Lane in Philadelphia. In 1972, the school sold the complex to Philadelphia College of Textiles and Science (today's Philadelphia University, which renovated the building and used it as a student center until demolishing it in 2006). The Lankenau school moved to 201 Spring Lane, today the site of Philadelphia's Lankenau High School.

In 1901, Lankenau sustained a stroke at his summer home in Cape May, New Jersey. He recovered, but died on August 30 of a second stroke in Philadelphia.

In his will, he left $2 million ($77,400,000 today) to the German Hospital, which on the 100th anniversary of his birth in 1917, renamed itself Lankenau Hospital; today, it is known as Lankenau Medical Center.
