= Stoner =

Stoner or Stoners may refer to:

== People ==
- Stoner (bass guitarist)
- Alyson Stoner (born 1993), American actress and dancer
- Andrew Stoner (born 1960), Australian politician, member of the New South Wales Legislative Assembly, and the Leader of the New South Wales National Party
- Casey Stoner (born 1985), Australian motorcycle racer, world champion in 2007 and 2011
- Clarence Stoner (1901–1994), American politician from Pennsylvania
- Clayton Stoner (born 1985), Canadian ice hockey player
- Dillon Stoner (born 1998), American football player
- Edmund Clifton Stoner (1899–1968), theoretical physicist
- Eugene Stoner (1922–1997), weapons designer
- James A.F. Stoner, American author and professor
- Jesse Benjamin "J.B." Stoner (1924–2005), American white supremacist and segregationist
- Nicholas Stoner (1762–1853), Adirondack pioneer and Revolutionary War soldier
- Peter Stoner (1888–1980), professor of mathematics and astronomy and author
- Tobi Stoner (born 1984), Major League Baseball starting pitcher for the New York Mets

== Fictional characters ==
- Stoner, a character in the anime series Eureka Seven
- Helen and Julia Stoner, in The Adventure of the Speckled Band, a Sherlock Holmes story by Arthur Conan Doyle
- William Stoner, eponymous protagonist of the novel Stoner, by John Williams

== Music ==
- Stoner rock (or stoner metal), a rock music genre
- Stöner, an American stoner rock band
- "Stoner" (song), a song by American rapper Young Thug
- "Stoners" (song), a song by American pop duo Nina Sky

== Other ==
- Stoner (novel), a 1965 novel by John Williams
- Stoner 63 (XM207), a modular 5.56 mm assault rifle/LMG
- Stoner, Colorado, a community in the United States
- Stoner SR-25 a semi-automatic sniper rifle
- Stoners, a subculture consisting of cannabis users
  - Stoner film, a subgenre of comedy films
- Stoner, an alternate title for the 1974 Hong Kong film The Shrine of Ultimate Bliss
- Stoners, industrial stonecutters who worked the limestone quarries of southern Indiana
- A person who throws stones during a stoning
- Pennsylvania Stoners, an American soccer team based in Allentown, Pennsylvania, United States

== See also ==
- Stonor (disambiguation)
- Stone (disambiguation)
- Stoner Creek (disambiguation)
