= Sherman Stonor, 6th Baron Camoys =

6th Baron Camoys

The Right Honourable The Lord Camoys
- 6th Baron Camoys
- Camoys arms: Or, on a chief gules three plates
- Tenure: 1968-1976
- Predecessor: Ralph Stonor, 5th Baron Camoys
- Successor: Thomas Stonor, 7th Baron Camoys
- Born: Ralph Robert Watts Sherman Stonor; 5 July 1913
- Died: 9 March 1976 (aged 62)
- Offices: Deputy Lieutenant of Oxfordshire
- Spouse: Mary Jeanne née Stourton
- Issue: 5
- Parents: Ralph Stonor, 5th Baron Camoys

Ralph Robert Watts Sherman Stonor, 6th Baron Camoys, DL, JP (5 July 1913 – 9 March 1976) was an English aristocrat and Justice of the Peace.

== Biography ==
Stonor was born on 5 July 1913, the only son of Ralph Francis Julian Stonor, 5th Baron Camoys and Mildred Sherman, daughter of the American business magnate William Watts Sherman. As well as becoming a magistrate, he was a member of Oxfordshire County Council.

In 1938, Sherman Stonor married Mary Jeanne Stourton (1913-1987), the third and youngest daughter of Captain Herbert Marmaduke Joseph Stourton, OBE (grandson of the 19th Baron Stourton), and his wife, Frances (daughter of the 4th Viscount Southwell). The couple had the following issue:

- The Honorable Julia Maria Cristina Mildred Stonor, now The Honourable Julia Camoys Stonor (b. 1939) married Donald Saunders in 1963 (div 1977, annulled 1978, he died 1996), and has issue.
- Ralph Thomas Campion George Sherman Stonor, 7th Baron Camoys (1940−2023), married Elisabeth Hyde Parker in 1966 and has issue. Succeeded his father to the barony in 1976.
- The Honorable Georgina Mary Hope Stonor (b. 1941), unmarried
- The Honorable Harriet Pauline Sophia Stonor (b. 1943) married Julian Cotterell in 1965, and has issue.
- The Honourable John Edmund Robert Stonor (1946—1994), who died unmarried

== Notes ==
Peerage of England
Preceded by Ralph Stonor	Baron Camoys; 1968–1976	Succeeded by Ralph Stonor
