= Julia Camoys Stonor =

British writer

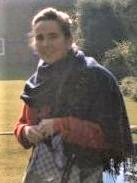
- Julia Stonor at her ancestral home Stonor Park circa 1975
- Born: Julia Maria Cristina Mildred Stonor; 19 April 1939 (age 87)
- Occupation: Writer
- Notable work: Sherman's Wife: A Wartime Childhood Among the English Aristocracy
- Relatives: Sherman Stonor, 6th Baron Camoys; Thomas Southwell, 4th Viscount Southwell; Charles Stourton, 19th Baron Stourton
- Website: http://www.juliacamoysstonor.com

Julia Maria Cristina Mildred Camoys Stonor (born 19 April 1939) is the eldest daughter of Sherman Stonor, 6th Baron Camoys by his wife Jeanne Stourton, and an author of books about her family claiming to expose long-suppressed family scandals and putting forward her claims to be the rightful heir to the Camoys barony.

== Ancestry ==
Julia Camoys Stonor was born Julia Maria Christina Mildred Stonor, the eldest daughter and first child of Ralph Robert Watts Sherman Stonor, 6th Baron Camoys of Stonor Park and Newport, Rhode Island, USA (1913–1976), by his wife (Mary) Jeanne Stourton (1913–1987). Her mother's maternal grandfather was Thomas Southwell, 4th Viscount Southwell. According to Julia Stonor, the Spanish aristocrat Pedro de Zulueta was her mother's father.

Legally, Jeanne Stourton's maternal grandfather was the paternal grandson of Charles Stourton, 19th Baron Stourton. Jeanne Stourton's great-uncle the 20th Lord Stourton succeeded as 20th Baron Stourton in 1872, and as 23rd Baron Mowbray & 24th Baron Segrave in 1878 when those baronies (last held by Edward Howard, 9th Duke of Norfolk) were called out of abeyance 101 years after his death in 1777.

== Biography ==
Stonor was educated at St Mary's Convent, Ascot. She is the author of Sherman's Wife: A Wartime Childhood Among the English Aristocracy, a memoir of her controversial mother Jeanne, Lady Camoys. She is currently at work on the second part of her memoirs, Sherman's Daughter. In the first book, she described her half-Spanish half-English mother, who was fathered by a Spanish aristocrat, and whose lover died in the Spanish Civil War fighting on Franco's side. Stonor alleged in the book that her mother was an ardent Nazi sympathizer, and had been the lover of several men including Joachim von Ribbentrop and her own father-in-law. She also controversially argued that her mother Jeanne had murdered her husband Lord Camoys (who died in 1976) and that Lady Camoys had been murdered by her younger son, The Honourable Robert Camoys (died 1994).

Stonor has claimed that she is the only legitimate child of her parents; her mother's other four children, including the present Lord Camoys, being illegitimate and biologically unrelated to Sherman Stonor. Thus, she has argued that she is the rightful heir to the Camoys barony.

She is an active supporter of several charities, including Exiled Writers Ink!, and has worked as a freelance writer, author, human rights activist, volunteer, and charity-supporter.

In 1980, she appeared on a segment of the BBC's Nationwide programme called Life Swap, where she swapped lives with Newcastle teacher Myra Robinson.

== Family ==
In 1963, Stonor married Donald Robin Slomnicki Saunders (1931 - 1996); the marriage ended in divorce in 1977, being annulled in 1978. Two children were born:

1. Alexander William Joseph Stonor Saunders (b. 1964) who married 2000 Mary Margaret Ohannessian, and has issue one son and one stepdaughter.
2. Frances Hélène Jeanne Stonor Saunders (b. 1966), or Frances Stonor Saunders, a British journalist and author of The Cultural Cold War: The C.I.A. and the World of Arts and Letters (The New Press, 2000; first published in the UK in 1999)

After the dissolution of her marriage, she resumed use of the name 'Stonor' by deed poll in 1978, assuming the additional name of 'Camoys'.

== Publications ==
- Sherman's Wife - A wartime childhood amongst the English Catholic Aristocracy, by Julia Camoys Stonor (published by Desert Hearts, 2006)
- Sherman's Daughter, by Julia Camoys Stonor (publication date to be confirmed)
