= Joseph William Drexel =

American banker, philanthropist, and book collector

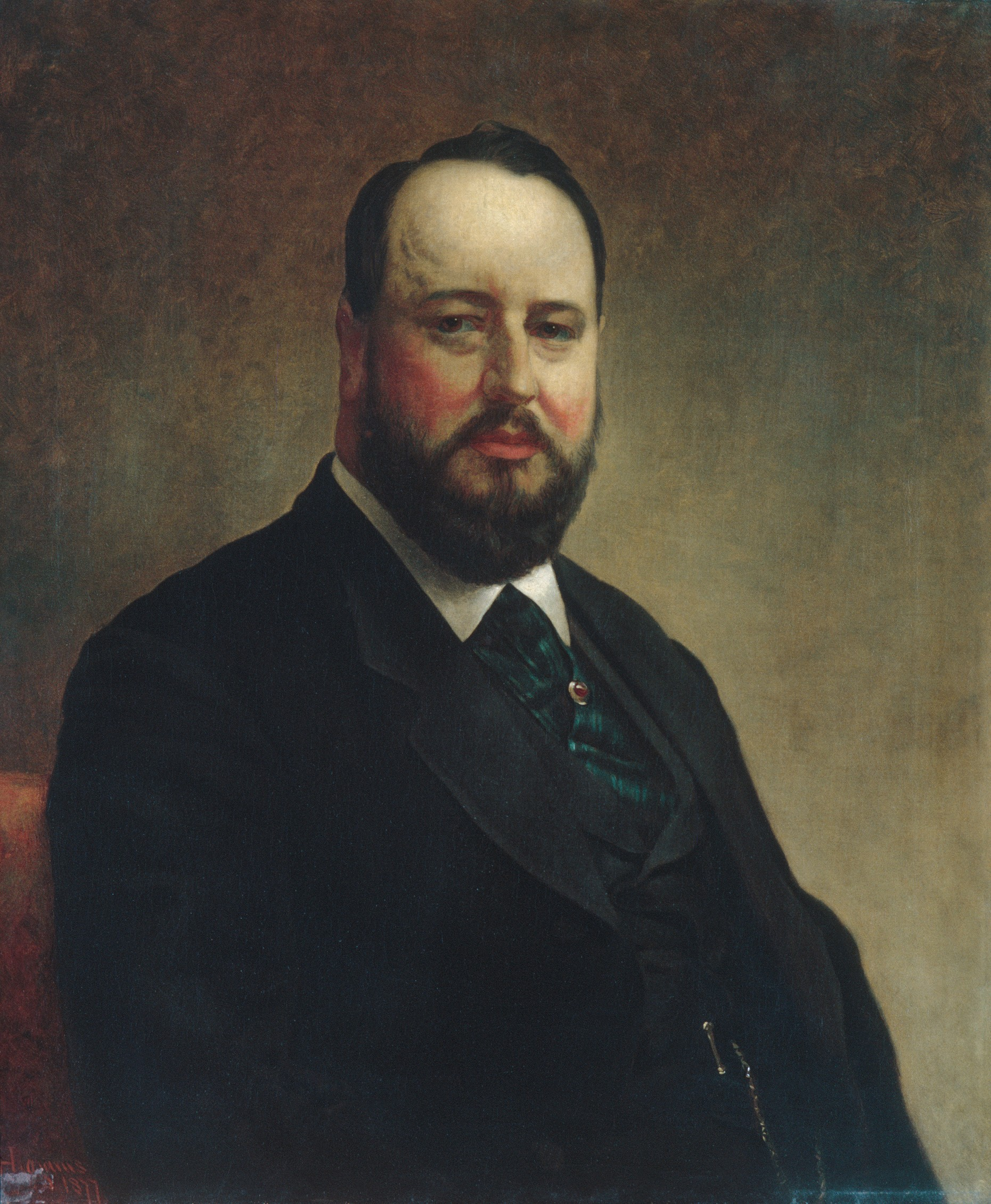
- 1877 portrait by Jacob H. Lazarus
- Born: January 24, 1833; Philadelphia, Pennsylvania, U.S.
- Died: March 25, 1888 (aged 55); New York City, New York, U.S.
- Occupations: Banker, philanthropist
- Spouse: Lucy Wharton
- Children: 4, including Elizabeth and Lucy
- Parent(s): Francis Martin Drexel; Catherine Hookey
- Relatives: Francis Anthony Drexel (brother); Anthony Joseph Drexel (brother); St. Katharine Drexel (niece)

Joseph William Drexel (January 24, 1833 – March 25, 1888) was a banker, philanthropist, and book collector.

== Early life and education ==
Drexel (Note: His middle name is given as Wilhelm in some sources, e.g.) was the son of Francis Martin Drexel (1792–1863) and Catherine Hookey (1795–1870). His siblings were Anthony Joseph Drexel (1826–1893) and Francis Anthony Drexel (1824–1885). Through his brother Francis, he was the uncle of Saint Katharine Drexel (1858–1955). Joseph Willam Drexel was raised a Roman Catholic, but he joined the Episcopal Church later.

Drexel attended the Central High School in Philadelphia, and traveled through Spain, Egypt, Syria, Turkey, and Greece.

== Career ==
Joseph Drexel was a partner in the firm of Drexel, Morgan and Company, where his brother, Anthony, was senior partner. In 1876, tired of battling the brusque J. Pierpont Morgan, Joseph retired from the business and devoted his life to philanthropic and civic organizations.

He owned a 200-acre (0.81 km^{2}) farm near New York City, where people without work were housed, clothed, fed, and taught agriculture until they could find a job. He owned a large tract of land in Maryland, which was developed into Klej Grange, a planned community, where the lots are sold to poor people at cost. About 7,000 acres (28 km^{2}) in Michigan were bought for the same purpose.

=== Society life ===
He was chairman of New York Sanitary Commission, the commissioner of education, president of the New York Philharmonic Society, trustee of the Metropolitan Museum of Art, founding trustee of the American Museum of Natural History, trustee of the U.S. National Academy of Sciences, and director of the Metropolitan Opera house.

In 1887, he donated a painting made by Edward Gay, that cost $2,000, to the State of New York to be placed in the Executive Mansion, which Governor David B. Hill was about to move into.

=== Collections ===
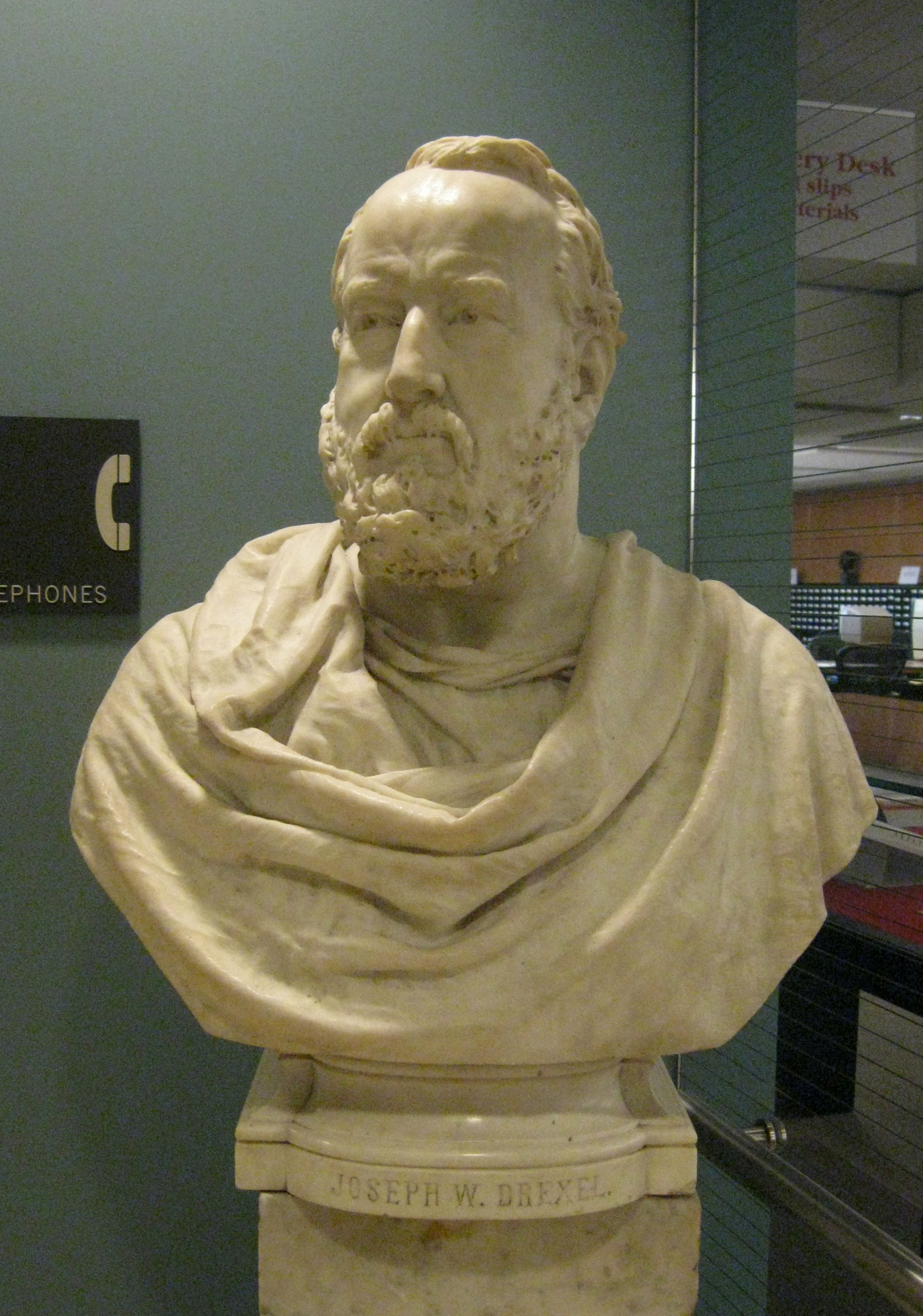
1889 bust of Drexel by John Quincy Adams Ward at the New York Public Library for the Performing Arts

Drexel was an avid collector of music, eventually amassing a collection of over 6,000 items. Upon his death, the Drexel Collection was accepted by the Lenox Library. When the Lenox Library was joined with those of John Jacob Astor and Samuel Tilden to form The New York Public Library, Drexel's collection became the basis for the Library's Music Division, housed today in the New York Public Library for the Performing Arts.

The Concordia Polka composed by Theodore Gundlach was dedicated to Drexel.

=== Mount McGregor ===
In 1881, Drexel acquired title to Mount McGregor near Saratoga Springs, New York. He constructed the Hotel Balmoral at the summit and built the Saratoga, Mount McGregor and Lake George Railroad narrow-gauge railway from Saratoga Springs. In 1885, Drexel loaned his private summer cottage on Mount McGregor to ex-president Ulysses S. Grant. Grant lived there for six weeks until his death and completed his memoirs. The cottage is now the Grant Cottage State Historic Site.

== Personal life ==
He married Lucy Wharton (1841–1912), the daughter of Thomas Lloyd Wharton (1799–1869) and Sarah Ann Smith (b. 1800) and great-granddaughter of Thomas Wharton Jr. Together, they had four children:

- Katherine Drexel (1866–1918), who married Dr. Charles Bingham Penrose (1862–1925), the brother of U.S. Senator Boies Penrose, Spencer Penrose, Richard A. F. Penrose Jr. and the grandson of Charles B. Penrose, Solicitor of the United States Treasury, in 1892. They had two children.
- Lucy Wharton Drexel (1867–1944), who married Eric Bernard Dahlgren Sr. (1866–1922), a son of John A. Dahlgren, and had eight children. They divorced in 1913.
- Elizabeth Wharton Drexel (1868–1944), who married John Vinton Dahlgren (1869–1899), another son of John A. Dahlgren, in 1889, with whom she had one son who survived infancy. After his death, she married New York Society leader Harry Lehr (1869–1929). After Lehr's death, she married John Beresford, 5th Baron Decies (1866–1944) and thereafter was known as Lady Decies.
- Josephine Wharton Drexel (1878-1966), who married Dr. John Duncan Emmet (1857–1923), the great-grandson of prominent physician, Dr. Thomas Addis Emmet, in 1904. They divorced in 1914 and in 1915, she married Seton Henry (d. 1946), the son of Gen. Guy Vernor Henry and brother of Guy Henry Jr., with whom she had children. She was the maternal grandmother of actor Matthew Cowles.

Drexel died at his home, 103 Madison Avenue in New York City, on March 25, 1888. He had been suffering from Bright's Disease for a year and a half before then. He was buried in The Woodlands Cemetery in Philadelphia.

== See also ==
- Drexel Collection
