= Francis Anthony Drexel =

American banker and philanthropist (1824-1885)

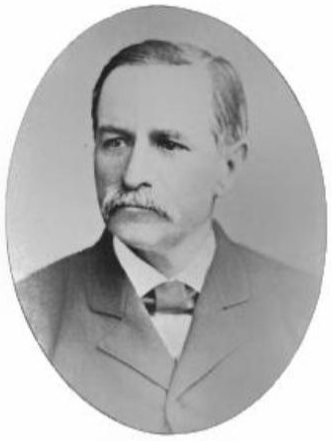
- Born: June 20, 1824; Philadelphia, Pennsylvania, U.S.
- Died: February 15, 1885 (aged 60); Philadelphia, Pennsylvania, U.S.
- Occupation: Banker
- Spouses: Hannah Jane Langstroth (m. 1854; died 1858) Emma Mary Bouvier (m. 1860; died 1883)
- Children: Elizabeth Drexel Smith; Katharine Drexel; Louise Bouvier Drexel Morrell
- Parent(s): Francis Martin Drexel; Catherine Hookey
- Relatives: Anthony Joseph Drexel (brother); Joseph William Drexel (brother); Elizabeth Wharton Drexel (niece)

Francis Anthony Drexel (June 20, 1824 – February 15, 1885) was a Philadelphia banker and philanthropist. He was the eldest son of Philadelphia financier Francis Martin Drexel, and became senior partner in the firm Drexel & Co. following his father's death.

== Early life ==
Drexel was born on 6th Street in Philadelphia, on June 20, 1824. He was the eldest son born to Francis Martin Drexel and Catherine (née Hookey) Drexel (1795–1870). Among his siblings were two younger brothers, Anthony Joseph Drexel and Joseph William Drexel.

== Career ==
His father worked as a portrait painter in Philadelphia before becoming an exchange broker in 1837. Elsa Loacker Jones suggested that through his frequent travels, Drexel may have acquired considerable experience speculating in foreign exchange.

Francis Anthony started with the firm at the age of thirteen, as a clerk and night watchman. He also made some money playing the organ at St. John's Church in Manayunk.

As the business progressed, his younger brothers, Anthony and Joseph, also joined the firm. They formed a partnership in 1847 under the name of Drexel & Co. The company had offices in Philadelphia, New York, San Francisco, London, and Paris. The firm was involved in financing the Mexican–American War, the California Gold Rush, and the Union Army during the American Civil War, as well as the Industrial Revolution. After his father's death in 1863, Francis Drexel became the senior member of the firm but preferred that his younger brother Anthony take the directorship. Francis was of a retiring nature and supervised the office and counting-house.

== Personal life ==
In 1854, Drexel was married to Hannah Jane Langstroth (1826–1858). Hannah was the daughter of Piscator Langstroth and Elizabeth (née Lehman) Langstroth. Together, the parents of two children, Hannah died five weeks after the birth of their second daughter:

- Elizabeth Langstroth Drexel (1855–1890), who married Walter George Smith (1854–1924), a son of Gen. Thomas Kilby Smith, in January 1890 and died of puerperal convulsions in September of the same year.
- Catherine Mary Drexel (1858–1955), who became a nun, founded the Sisters of the Blessed Sacrament, took the name Mother Katharine, and was declared a Catholic saint.

In 1860, he remarried to his second wife, Emma Mary Bouvier (1833–1883). Emma was the daughter of Louise (née Vernou) Bouvier and Michel Bouvier, a French cabinetmaker from Pont-Saint-Esprit in southern France who immigrated to Philadelphia in 1815 after having served in the Napoleonic Wars. Emma was an aunt of John Vernou Bouvier Jr., grandfather of Jacqueline (née Bouvier) Kennedy Onassis. They had one child:

- Louise Bouvier Drexel (1863–1945), who married Edward de Veaux Morrell (1862–1917), later a U.S. Representative, in 1889.

Drexel purchased a country estate in Torresdale just outside Philadelphia. Although it was intended as a summer retreat, the family spent the better part of the year there from late spring to mid-autumn with Drexel taking the train to work. It was not far from the Motherhouse of the Sisters of the Sacred Heart, where the second Mrs. Drexel's sister, Mother Louis Bouvier, resided for a time. Mrs. Drexel and her daughters were frequent visitors.

His second wife also predeceased him, dying at their residence in Philadelphia in January 1883. He died at his home, 1503 Walnut Street in Philadelphia on February 15, 1885. After a funeral at St. Mary's Catholic Church in Philadelphia, he was buried in the Drexel family vault at the Sisters of the Blessed Sacrament Cemetery. Of his estimated $15,000,000 fortune, he left ten percent to charity and the remainder in trust for his three daughters.

== Philanthropy ==
Francis Drexel supported and encouraged his wife, Emma's, charitable undertakings. Three days a week, Emma Drexel would distribute food, clothing, shoes, medicine, or rent money to any poor person who came to their door. She employed an assistant who would visit tenements, assess the need, and give them a ticket to present to Mrs. Drexel. The Drexels spent about $30,000 annually on the home-based charity, including paying the rent for 150 families. Many of the items distributed were made by the magdalens at the Convent of the Good Shepherd, thus assisting both the women who made the clothing and those who received it.

Among Drexel's interest was Eden Hall, the Torresdale convent of the Society of the Sacred Heart where his wife, Emma, had attended the academy. Mrs. Drexel was the first president of the alumnae association, Les Enfants de Marie du Monde. Drexel periodically made contributions toward the improvement of the chapel. After Emma's death in 1883, he donated a Lady chapel and a crypt below. Drexel also donated the marble side altars for Sacred Heart Church in Wilmington, Delaware.

Francis and his brother Anthony funded the Francis M. Drexel Memorial Fountain, one of the oldest public sculptures in Chicago in Drexel Square in honor of their father.

Drexel left bequests to Saint Joseph's College, the House of the Good Shepherd, the Lutheran-run German Hospital of Philadelphia (where his brother-in-law John D. Lankenau was a trustee), St. John's Orphan Asylum for Boys, St. Joseph's Female Orphan Asylum where he had served both as a board member, and La Salle College, which in 1886 relocated to the former mansion of Drexel's father-in-law, Michel Bouvier. Other distributees included the Society of Jesus, the Christian Brothers, and the Religious of the Sacred Heart. Old St. Joseph's Church was renovated.

== Legacy ==
The Francis A. Drexel Library at Saint Joseph's University is named in his honor. His daughters Elizabeth and Louise founded the St. Francis Industrial School at Eddington, Pennsylvania, as provided in their father's will. They also endowed the Francis A. Drexel Chair of Moral Theology at the Catholic University of America.
