= Thomas Stonor, 7th Baron Camoys =

British peer and banker (1940–2023)

The Right Honourable The Lord Camoys GCVO PC DL

Lord Chamberlain
- In office 1 January 1998 – 31 May 2000
- Monarch: Elizabeth II
- Preceded by: The Earl of Airlie
- Succeeded by: The Lord Luce

Personal details
- Born: Ralph Thomas Campion George Sherman Stonor; 16 April 1940
- Died: 4 January 2023 (aged 82)
- Spouse: Elisabeth Mary Hyde Parker
- Children: 4
- Parent(s): Sherman Stonor, 6th Baron Camoys; Mary Jeanne Stourton
- Education: MA (Oxford), DLitt (Sheffield)

Ralph Thomas Campion George Sherman Stonor, 7th Baron Camoys, GCVO, PC, DL (16 April 1940 – 4 January 2023) was a British peer and banker who served as Lord Chamberlain of the United Kingdom from 1998 to 2000, and the first Catholic Lord Chamberlain since the Reformation.

== Early life ==
The 7th Baron Camoys was the son of Sherman Stonor, 6th Baron Camoys and Mary Jeanne, daughter of Major Herbert Marmaduke Stourton. On his father's side, he was a descendant of the Talbot Earls of Shrewsbury, the Nevills of Abergavenny and, through an illegitimate line, the de la Pole Dukes of Suffolk. He was a direct descendant of British Prime Minister Robert Peel whose daughter Eliza married The Hon. Francis Stonor. Through his father's side he was a descendant of the family that founded Brown University in Rhode Island in the United States. On his mother's side, he was descended from Charles II of England and Scotland through that monarch's illegitimate daughter, Charlotte Lee, Countess of Lichfield.

== Education ==
Lord Camoys was educated at Eton College and Balliol College, Oxford, graduating with an MA degree in Modern History.

== Career ==
Lord Camoys' main career was in banking. He was General manager/Director of National Provincial and Rothschild (London) Ltd. in 1968, and managing director of Rothschild Intercontinental Bank Ltd. in 1969. After the purchase of Rothschild Intercontinental Bank by American Express in 1975, he was named CEO and managing director of Amex Bank Ltd, 1975–77, and chairman between 1977 and 1978. Lord Camoys was managing director of Barclays Merchant Bank from 1978 to 1984, and Executive Vice-Chairman from 1984 to 1986.

After the widespread reforms of the City of London's financial structures in 1986 (Big Bang), Barclays Merchant Bank became Barclays de Zoete Wedd (BZW), of which Lord Camoys was the first Chief Executive from 1986 to 1988, and deputy chairman from 1988 to 1998. BZW later became Barclays Capital. He was a Director of Barclays Bank International Ltd between 1980 and 1984, and Barclays Bank Plc between 1984 and 1994.

Lord Camoys was Chairman of Jacksons of Piccadilly from 1968 to 1985. He was Deputy Chairman of Sotheby's from 1993 to 1997. He was a director of Mercantile Credit Co Ltd from 1980 to 1984, National Provident Institution from 1982 to 1993, the Administrative Staff College from 1989 – 2000, 3i Group Plc from 1991 to 2002, and Perpetual from 1994 to 2000. He was President of the Mail Users Association from 1977 to 1984. He was a member of the Court of Assistants of the Fishmongers Company from 1980. He served the latter livery company as Prime Warden from 1992 to 1993. He was a Steward of Henley Royal Regatta since 1978, and President of The River and Rowing Museum since 1997.

=== Governmental career ===
Following the death of his father, he became the 7th Lord Camoys as well as a member of the House of Lords on 8 March 1976. He was a member of the select committee on the European Economic Community (EEC) between 1979 and 1981, and a member of the Historic Buildings and Monuments Commission for England from 1985 to 1987 (now English Heritage) and the Royal Commission on Historical Manuscripts from 1987 to 1994.

He was a Lord in Waiting from 1992 to 1997 to Queen Elizabeth II, and was a Permanent Lord in Waiting from 2000. He was Lord Chamberlain of the United Kingdom from 1998 to 2000, when he retired due to ill health. He followed David Ogilvy, 13th Earl of Airlie and was succeeded by Lord Luce. He was the first Catholic Lord Chamberlain since the Reformation.

== Religious career ==
He was a consultor of the Extraordinary Session of the Administration of the Patrimony of the Holy See from 1991 until 2006. Lord Camoys was appointed Chairman of The Tablet Trust in June 2009.

== Marriage and family life ==
The seventh Baron married Elisabeth Mary Hyde Parker, daughter of Sir William Hyde Parker, 11th Bt. of Melford Hall, Suffolk, in 1966. The couple has the following issue:

- The Hon. Alina Mary Stonor (born 1967) – she married Simon Barrowcliff in 1994; the couple has three children.
- The Hon. Emily Mary Julia Stonor (born 1969) – she married John Dalrymple, 14th Earl of Stair (born 1961) in 2006; the couple has a son and a daughter.
- The Hon. Sophie Ulla Stonor (born 29 September 1971) – she married James Alastair Stourton, younger son of Charles Stourton, 26th Baron Mowbray, in 1993; the marriage was dissolved via annulment in 1997; she remarried in 2001 to a Bavarian nobleman, Moritz Florian Maria Freiherr von Hirsch; the couple has two sons.
- (Ralph) William Robert Thomas Stonor, 8th Baron Camoys (born 10 September 1974) – he married, in 2004, Lady Ailsa Fiona Mackay, the younger daughter of Peter Mackay, 4th Earl of Inchcape; the couple has two sons and a daughter.

Lord Camoys' ancestral home is Stonor Park, Henley-on-Thames, Oxfordshire.

== Honours ==
- Lord Camoys was made a Knight Grand Cross of the Royal Victorian Order (GCVO) in 1998, and a Privy Counsellor (PC) in the same year.
- He was a Deputy lieutenant (DL) of Oxfordshire from 1993.
- He received the Nepalese Order of Gorkha Dadshina Bahu, 1st Class, in 1981.
- He received an Honorary D.Litt degree from the University of Sheffield in 2001.
- In 2006 he was made Knight Grand Cross of the Papal Order of St. Gregory the Great (GCSG) by Pope Benedict XVI.

Court offices
Preceded by The Earl of Airlie	Lord Chamberlain; 1998–2000	Succeeded by The Lord Luce
Peerage of England
Preceded by Sherman Stonor	Baron Camoys; 1976–2023	Succeeded by William Stonor
