= Francis Martin Drexel =

American banker and painter (1792–1863)

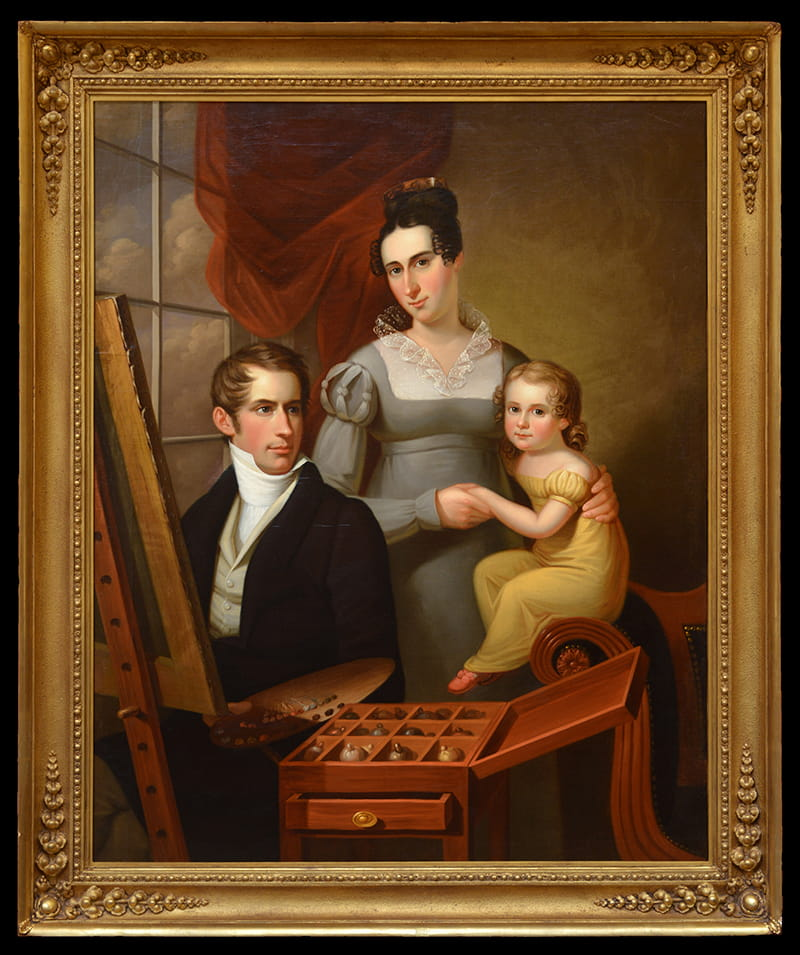
- Drexel family self-portrait
- Born: April 7, 1792; Dornbirn, Vorarlberg, Holy Roman Empire
- Died: June 5, 1863 (aged 71); Philadelphia, Pennsylvania, U.S.
- Occupation: Banker
- Spouse: Catherine Hookey (m. 1821)
- Children: Mary Johanna Drexel; Francis Anthony Drexel; Anthony Joseph Drexel; Joseph William Drexel; Heloise Drexel; Caroline Drexel

Francis Martin Drexel (April 7, 1792 – June 5, 1863) was an Austrian-American banker and artist. He was the father of Anthony Joseph Drexel, the founder of Drexel University, and present-day J.P. Morgan & Co, and the grandfather of Katharine Drexel.

== Early life ==
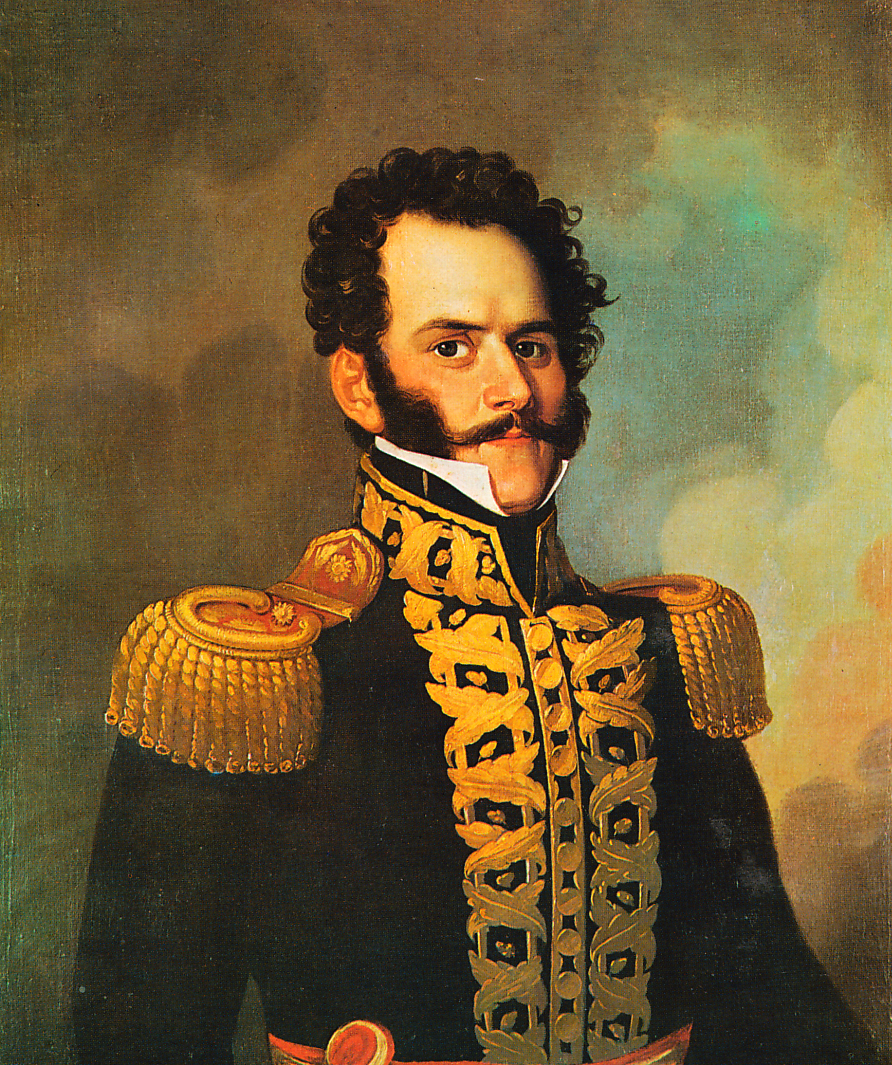
A portrait of Blas Cerdeña by Drexel

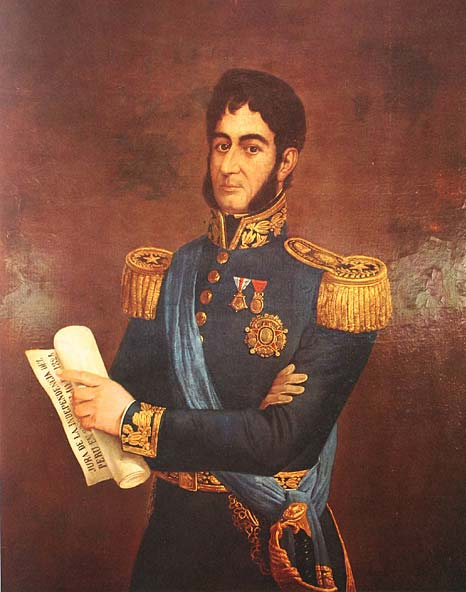
A portrait of San Martín by Drexel

Drexel was born April 7, 1792, the eldest son of Franz Josef Drexel and Magdalena Wilhelm, in Dornbirn, in Vorarlberg, Holy Roman Empire, not far from the Switzerland border. His father was a successful merchant with business associates in both Switzerland and Italy. In 1803, Francis was sent to study Italian and French at a Catholic convent school In Italy. Drexel eventually became conversant in five languages. He returned two years later and was apprenticed to a painter in a nearby village. When Napoleon invaded Austria, in order to escape conscription, and with help from his father, he crossed the Rhine River into Switzerland, where he remained for about five years, painting portraits, houses, and signs to support himself. In 1812, he returned to the Tyrol incognito. Conscription was still in force, so he went to Bern and continued his study of painting.

== Career ==
In May 1817, Drexel took a ship from Amsterdam on the John of Baltimore, headed for Philadelphia, where he opened a studio and found work as an art instructor at Bazeley's Female Academy. A popular portrait painter, his work was frequently shown at Pennsylvania Academy of Fine Arts annual exhibitions in Philadelphia.

A lawsuit for libel against his brother-in-law, Bernard Gallagher, was settled out of court as damages would have bankrupted the latter. Although Gallagher acknowledged the false statements, nonetheless, commissions for paintings decreased and Drexel lost his position at Bazeley's. He then left his wife and two children in Philadelphia, to travel to Peru and Chile, painting portraits, including one of General Simón Bolívar. Drexel visited South America twice as well as Mexico.

=== Drexel & Co. ===
In 1837, after his permanent settlement in Philadelphia, he founded the banking house of Drexel & Co. which became one of the largest banks in the United States. The original business of Drexel & Co. was discounting privately issued bank notes, the value of which was largely dependent on the character of the principal officers of the issuing bank. The exposure to the principals gained from portrait painting is said to have given Drexel advantageous knowledge.

After his death in 1860, the Paris firm, Drexel, Harjes & Co., was founded in 1868, and the New York firm, Drexel, Morgan & Co., was founded in 1871.

== Children ==
Drexel married Catherine Hookey (1795–1870) at the Holy Trinity Roman Catholic Church at Sixth and Spruce streets on April 23, 1821. They had the following children:

- Mary Johanna Drexel (1822–1873), who married John D. Lankenau (1817–1901), a businessman and philanthropist
- Francis Anthony Drexel (1824–1885), who married Hannah J. Langstroth (1826–1858), and then Emma Mary Bouvier (1833–1883)
- Anthony Joseph Drexel (1826–1893), who married Ellen B. Rozet (1832–1891). He was one of the founders of modern finance as well as Drexel University.
- Joseph William Drexel (1833–1888), who married Lucy Wharton (1841–1912). He was a trustee of the Metropolitan Museum of Art, the U.S. National Academy of Sciences, and director of the Metropolitan Opera
- Heloise C. Drexel (1837–1895), who married James Charles Smith (1828–1893)
- Caroline "Carrie" Drexel (1838–1911), who married stockbroker John Goddard Watmough (1837–1913), son of Col. John Watmough.

Drexel died in 1863, a result of injuries suffered in a train accident, and was buried in The Woodlands Cemetery in Philadelphia, Pennsylvania.

=== Descendants ===
Through his eldest son, Francis Anthony Drexel, he was the paternal grandfather of Saint Katharine Drexel (1858–1955). Through his son, Joseph William Drexel, he was the paternal grandfather of Elizabeth Wharton Drexel (1868–1944), a prominent socialite who married John Beresford, 5th Baron Decies (1866–1944).

== Death and legacy ==
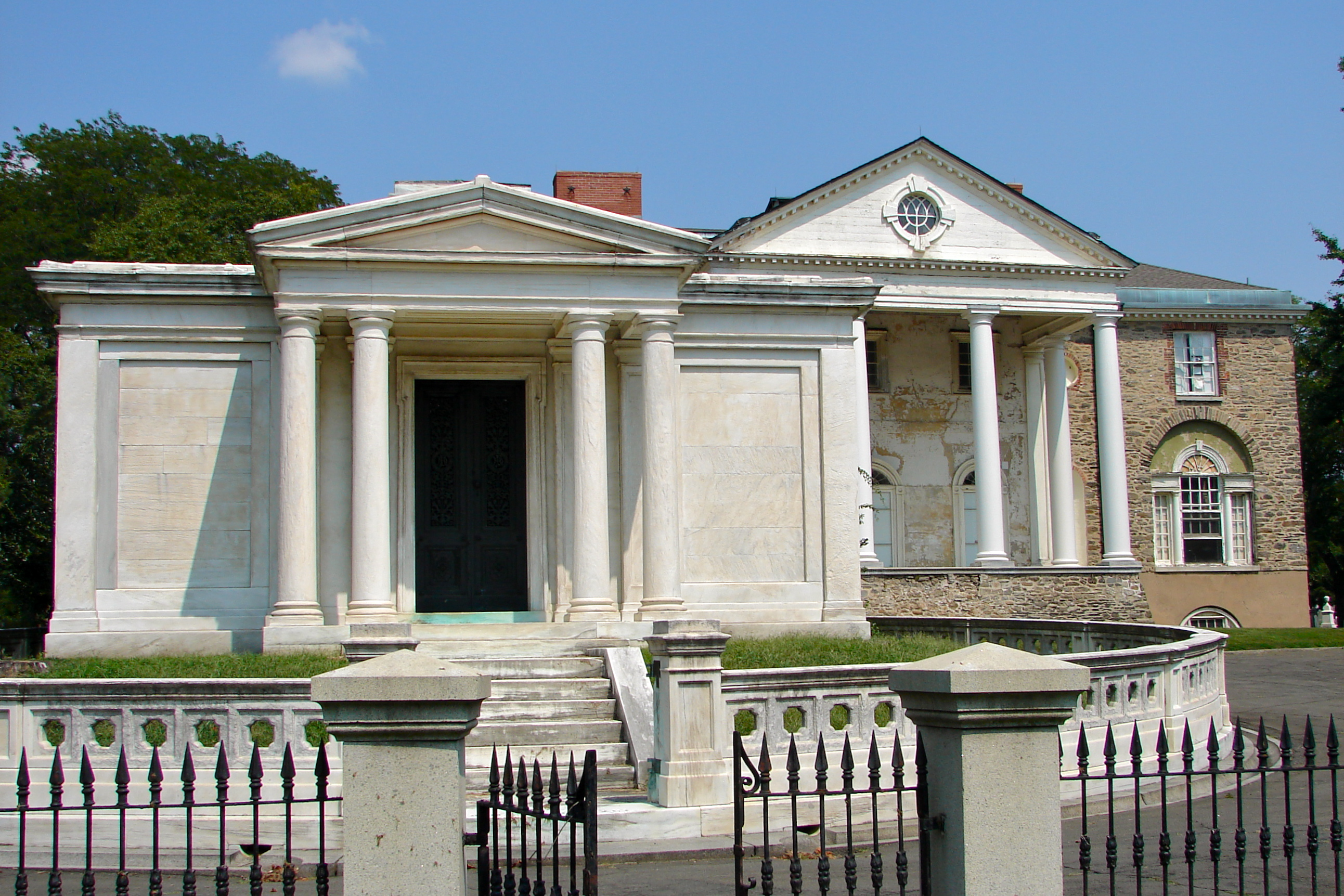
Francis M. Drexel Mausoleum in The Woodlands

He died on June 5, 1863.

A sculpture of Drexel stands atop the Francis M. Drexel Memorial Fountain in Drexel Square in Chicago. Drexel donated the land that came to be known as Drexel Boulevard. One of the oldest public sculptures in Chicago, it was commissioned by his sons Francis A. and Anthony J. Drexel.

Drexel Park, located on S. Damen St. in Chicago, is named after Drexel Blvd. Drexel presented another large tract – one further east – to the South Park Commission for use as parkland.

== See also ==
- Francis M. Drexel School
