= Anthony Joseph Drexel =

American banker (1826–1893)

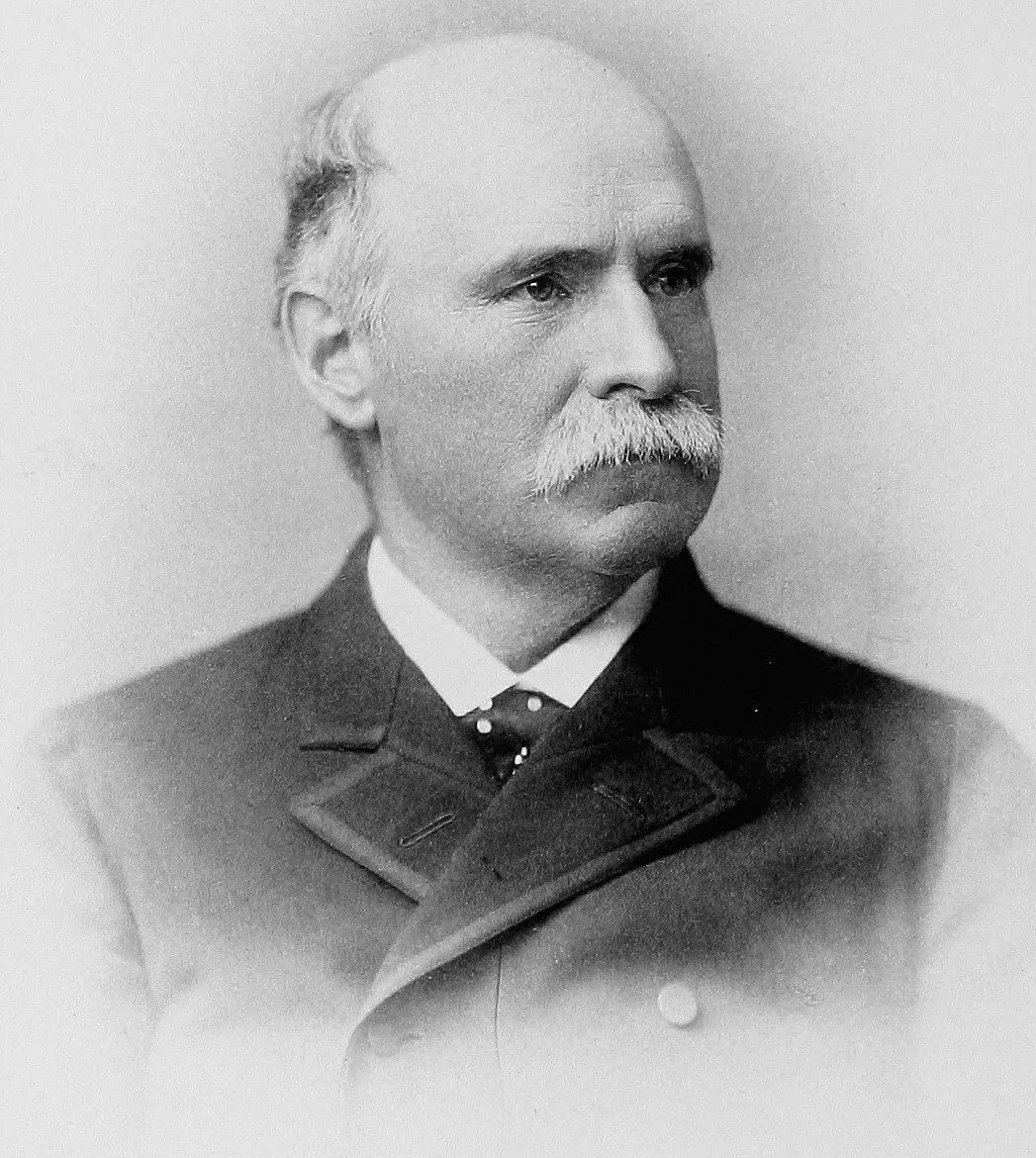
- Born: September 13, 1826; Philadelphia, Pennsylvania, U.S.
- Died: June 30, 1893 (aged 66); Karlsbad, Bohemia, Austria-Hungary
- Occupation: Banker
- Spouse: Ellen B. Rozet
- Children: 9
- Parent(s): Francis Martin Drexel; Catherine Hookey
- Relatives: Francis Anthony Drexel (brother); Joseph William Drexel (brother); St. Katharine Drexel (niece); Elizabeth Wharton Drexel (niece); Anthony Drexel Biddle Sr. (grandson); Anthony Drexel Biddle Jr. (great-grandson)

Pennsylvania Historical Marker
- Official name: Anthony J. Drexel (1826–1893)
- Type: City
- Criteria: Business & Industry, Education, Entrepreneurs, Railroads
- Designated: April 2005
- County: Philadelphia County
- Location: 48 S Third Street, Philadelphia, Pennsylvania, U.S. 39.94899°N 75.14581°W

Anthony Joseph Drexel Sr. (September 13, 1826 – June 30, 1893) was an American banker who played a major role in the rise of modern global finance after the American Civil War. As the dominant partner of Drexel & Co. of Philadelphia, he founded Drexel, Morgan & Co, which later became J.P. Morgan & Co., now JPMorgan Chase, in 1871 with J. P. Morgan as his junior partner. He also founded Drexel University in Philadelphia in 1891.

In 1892, Drexel was elected to the American Philosophical Society. He was also the first president of the Fairmount Park Art Association, now the Association for Public Art, the nation's first private organization dedicated to integrating public art and urban planning.

== Early life ==
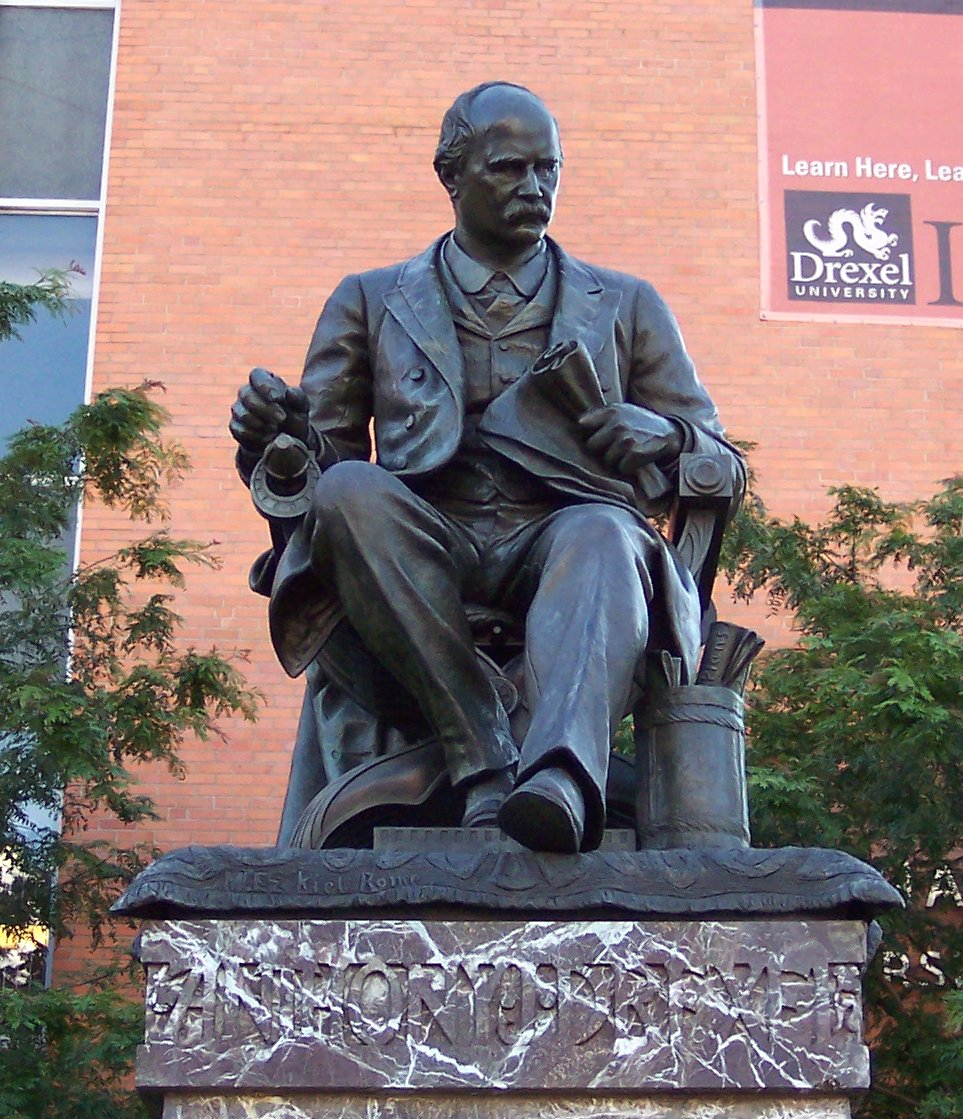
Drexel's statue at Drexel University in Philadelphia

Drexel was born in 1826 in Philadelphia to Francis Martin Drexel (1792–1863) and Catherine Hookey (1795–1870). He was the brother of Francis Anthony Drexel, and Joseph William Drexel. He was the uncle of Saint Katharine Drexel. Anthony Joseph Drexel was raised a Roman Catholic, but he joined the Episcopal Church later.

== Career ==
At the age of 13, Drexel began working in the banking house founded three years earlier by his father, the Austrian-born American banker Francis Martin Drexel. In 1847 he was named a member of the firm Drexel & Company, the original predecessor of what would become Drexel Burnham Lambert.

After the death of his father in 1863, Drexel closed the bank's Chicago and San Francisco offices and changed the name of its New York branch from Read, Drexel & Co. to Drexel Winthrop. In 1867, he founded a separate Paris-based banking partnership, Drexel, Harjes & Co., with John H. Harjes and Eugene Winthrop.

Three years later, in 1871, at the urging of Junius Spencer Morgan in London, Drexel became the mentor of Junius's troubled son, John Pierpont Morgan of New York, and entered into a new partnership with young Morgan, forming Drexel, Morgan & Co. This new merchant banking partnership, which was based in New York, rather than Philadelphia, served initially as an agent for Europeans investing in the United States. Over the next generation, this partnership assumed the leading role in financing America's railroads and stabilizing and revitalizing Wall Street's chaotic securities markets. The firm created a national capital market for industrial companies— a market that had previously existed only for railroads and canals. To restore investor confidence, Drexel, Morgan & Co. underwrote the pay of the entire U.S. Army when Congress refused to do so in 1877, bailed out the U.S. government during the Panic of 1895 and rescued the New York Stock Exchange during the Panic of 1907. With the formation of Drexel, Morgan & Co., Drexel Harjes became the French affiliate of an international banking firm with offices in London, Philadelphia, New York City and Paris that would subsequently become J.P. Morgan & Co.

Two years after Drexel's death in 1893, Drexel, Morgan & Co. was renamed J.P. Morgan & Co., one of the original predecessors of what is today JPMorgan Chase. In 1901, the bank financed the formation of the United States Steel Corporation, the world's first billion-dollar corporation, which took over the business of Andrew Carnegie and other companies.

== Personal life ==
Drexel married Ellen B. Rozet (1832–1891), the daughter of John Roset (1794–1870) and Mary Ann Laning (1807–1880) in 1850 in a service officiated by Dutch Reformed clergyman Rev. John D. Ludlow, father-in-law of the bride's sister. Although raised a Roman Catholic, Drexel subsequently converted to his wife's Episcopalian faith. He and his family were members of the Church of the Saviour, now Philadelphia Cathedral, where Drexel served first as a vestryman, and later as warden. Murals located in the apse of the church honor his memory.

The Drexels had nine children:

- Emilie Taylor Drexel (1851–1883), who married Edward Biddle III (1851-1933)
- Frances Katherine Drexel (1852–1892), who married James William Paul Jr.
- Marie Rozet Drexel (1854–1855), who died young.
- Mae E. Drexel (1857–1886), who married Charles T. Stewart
- Sarah Rozet "Sallie" Drexel (1860–1929), who married John R. Fell Sr. (1858–1895), and after his death married Alexander Van Rensselaer (1850–1933)
- Francis Anthony Drexel II (1861–1869), who died young.
- John Rozet Drexel (1863–1935), who married Alice Gordon Troth (1865–1947)
- Anthony Joseph Drexel Jr. (1864–1934), who married Margarita Armstrong (1867–1948). They divorced in 1917 and in 1918, she remarried to Brinsley FitzGerald (1859–1931)
- George William Childs Drexel (1868–1944), who married Mary Stretch Irick (1868–1948). He inherited $10 million from his father, whom best friend George William Childs, he was named after.

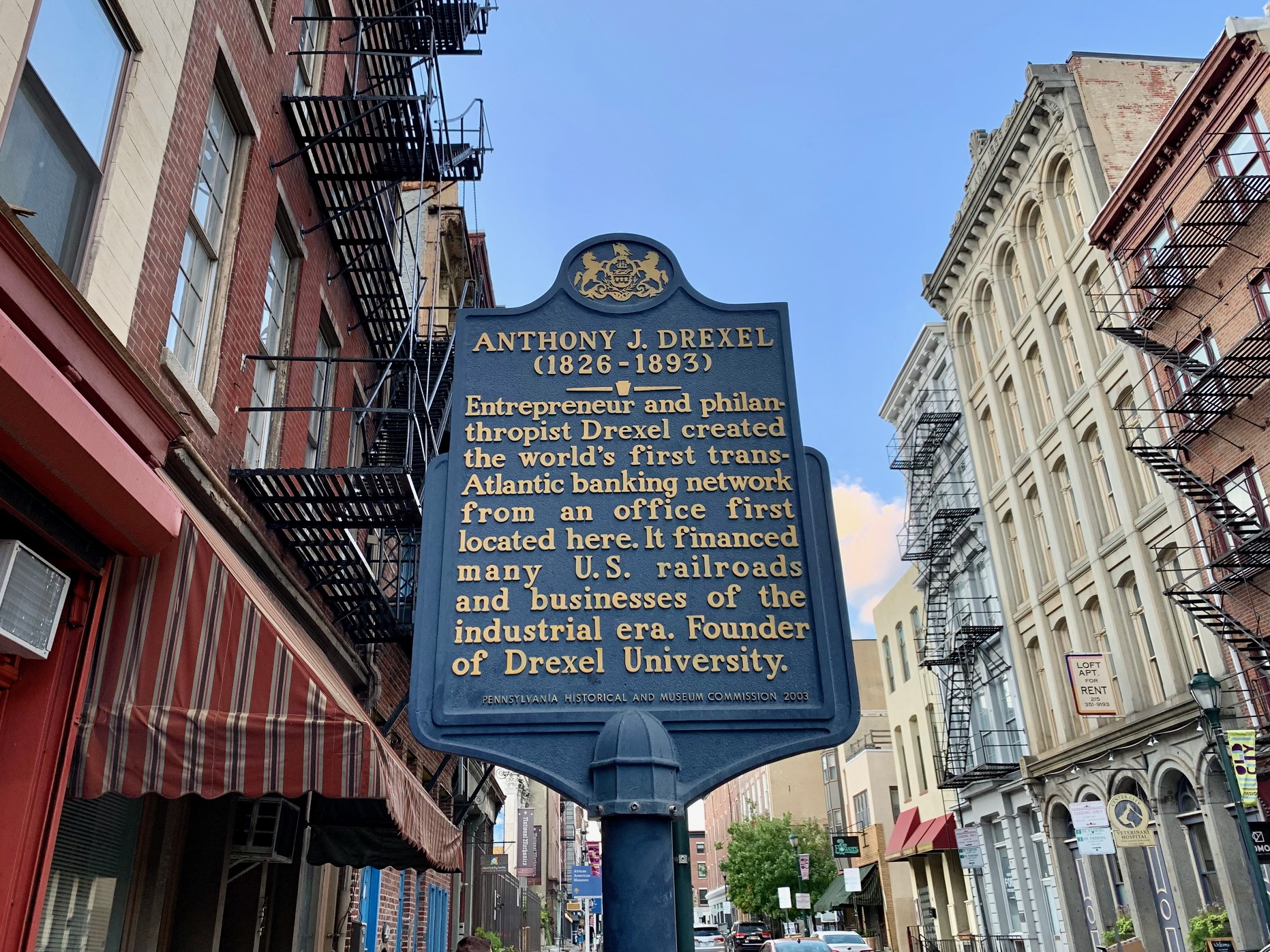
Historical marker commemorating Drexel in Old City, Philadelphia.

Upon the death of his sister-in-law, Hannah Jane Langstroth Drexel, in 1858, Anthony and Ellen cared for his nieces, three-year-old Elizabeth and five-week-old Katherine for the next two years. When his older brother Francis married Emma Bouvier in 1860, Francis brought his two daughters home.

Anthony was also the grandfather of Anthony Joseph Drexel Biddle Sr. (1874–1948) and the great-grandfather of Anthony Joseph Drexel Biddle Jr. (1897–1961), the United States Ambassador to Czechoslovakia, Poland, and Norway.

Drexel died of a heart attack on June 30, 1893, in Karlsbad (in the German-speaking part of Bohemia, Austrian Empire), today Karlovy Vary, Czech Republic, at the age of 66, and was buried in Woodlands Cemetery in Philadelphia.
