= Fairman Rogers =

American academic (1833–1900)

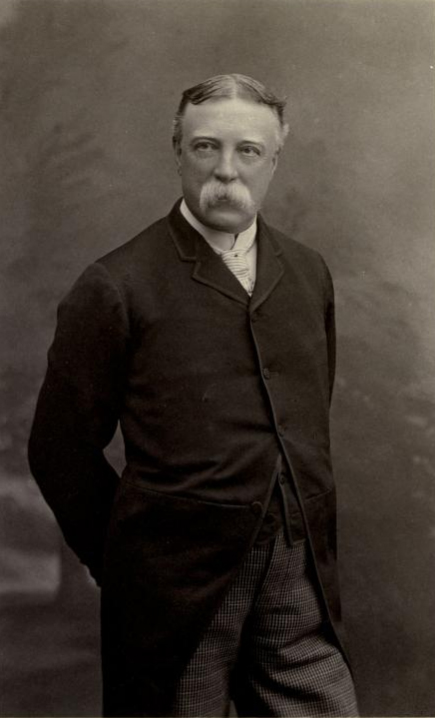
- Rogers c. 1890
- Born: November 15, 1833; Philadelphia, Pennsylvania, U.S.
- Died: August 22, 1900 (aged 66); Vienna, Austria
- Resting place: Laurel Hill Cemetery, Philadelphia, Pennsylvania, U.S.
- Education: University of Pennsylvania
- Occupations: Civil engineer, educator, philanthropist

Fairman Rogers (November 15, 1833 – August 22, 1900) was an American civil engineer, educator and equestrian. He worked as a professor of civil engineering at the University of Pennsylvania from 1855 to 1871 and as a trustee from 1871 to 1886. He was one of the founders of the Department of Mines, Arts and Manufactures and co-founded the School of Veterinary Sciences at the University.

He served briefly in the First Troop Philadelphia City Cavalry during the American Civil War and volunteered his engineering talents to survey the Potomac River and during the Antietam and Gettysburg campaigns.

He served as director of the Pennsylvania Academy of the Fine Arts, as chairman of their committee on instruction from 1878 to 1883, and led the competition for the design and construction of their new building. He was an avid equestrian and coach driving enthusiast. He published pamphlets and books on the topic and founded the Philadelphia Coaching Club. His collection of over 1,000 books with a focus on horses was donated to the University of Pennsylvania to create the Fairman Rogers Collection.

== Early life and education ==
Fairman Rogers was born in Philadelphia on November 15, 1833, to Caroline Augusta and Evans Rogers. His father was a wealthy industrialist. He graduated from the University of Pennsylvania with an A.B. in 1853 and an A.M. in 1856. In 1850, as an undergraduate, he was a founding member of the Zeta Psi fraternity, Sigma chapter.

After graduation, he befriended professor Alexander Dallas Bache who worked as Superintendent of the United States Coast Survey. Rogers volunteered to support the project and worked in Florida and Maine.

== Academic career ==
He taught civil engineering at the University of Pennsylvania from 1855 to 1871. He studied roads and bridges and lectured at the Franklin Institute on mechanics and physics and at Harvard University on road construction. He was one of four professors who founded its Department of Mines, Arts and Manufacturers in 1855. He co-founded the School of Veterinary Science and served as a University Trustee from 1871 to 1886.

In 1857, at age 24, Rogers was elected to the American Philosophical Society. He was a member of the American Society of Civil Engineers, the Academy of Natural Sciences and a charter member of the National Academy of Sciences. He was the author of Terrestrial Magnetism and the Magnetism of Iron Ships (1877, revised 1883).

In 1871, he was elected director of the Pennsylvania Academy of the Fine Arts. He led the 1871 design competition for the museum-and-art-school's new building, which was won by the novice firm of Furness & Hewitt. He served as chairman of PAFA's Committee on Instruction (1878–83).

He recruited the controversial artist Thomas Eakins back to teach at the school, and commissioned the painting from him: The Fairman Rogers Four-in-Hand (1879–80). It shows Rogers, his wife, and friends driving through Philadelphia's Fairmount Park. In 1882, he promoted Eakins to director of PAFA's art school.

Rogers and Eakins were advocates of the work of Eadweard Muybridge and his pioneering photography technique of capturing the movement of horses. They brought Muybridge's work to the attention of William Pepper, the provost of the University of Pennsylvania, and were able to bring Muybridge to the University of Pennsylvania to continue his work.

== Military career ==
In 1861, he served as first sergeant in the First Troop Philadelphia City Cavalry for three months during the American Civil War. He worked on the engineering staffs of General John F. Reynolds and General William F. Smith. As a volunteer officer in the United States Army Corps of Engineers, he completed an 1862 survey mapping the Potomac River. He volunteered as an engineering officer in the Pennsylvania Volunteers and participated in the Antietam and Gettysburg campaigns. After the war, he was elected captain of the troop. He was one of the founders of the Union League of Philadelphia.

== Equestrianism ==
Rogers' was an avid equestrian and coach riding enthusiast. He published a pamphlet on equestrianism and A Manual of Coaching (Philadelphia: 1900). He founded the Philadelphia Coaching Club and was the first person to drive a four-in-hand carriage in Philadelphia.

Rogers' favorite mare, "Josephine," the lead horse in The Fairman Rogers Four-in-Hand, died in 1882. He donated the carcass to PAFA, where Eakins and his students studied and dissected it. Based on this process, Eakins modeled three écorché statuettes to serve as teaching tools for equine musculature.

== Personal life ==
Rogers hired Furness to alter his Rittenhouse Square city house (1871), and to design "Fairholme" (1874–75, now altered), his summer cottage in Newport, Rhode Island. He also had a country house in Wallingford, Pennsylvania. Rogers later sold his city house, and Furness altered it for Alexander J. Cassatt in 1888.

He was an amateur photographer and one of the founders of the Philadelphia Photographic Society.

He married Rebecca H. Gilpin in January 1856.

== Death and legacy ==
Rogers died in Vienna on August 22, 1900, and was interred in Laurel Hill Cemetery in Philadelphia.

In 1903, his brother-in-law, Horace Howard Furness, wrote a biographical memoir titled F. R. [Fairman Rogers] 1833-1900 (Philadelphia: privately printed, 1903).

The University of Pennsylvania established the Fairman Rogers Collection which contains over 1,000 books with a focus on horses. In 2007, the University hosted an exhibition titled "Equus Unbound: Fairman Rogers and the Age of the Horse" which displayed works from the collection.

== Publications ==
- The Magnetism of Iron Vessels With a Short Treatise on Terrestrial Magnetism., New York: D. Van Nostrand, Publisher, 1877
- "A Manual of Coaching", Philadelphia: J.B. Lippincott Company, 1900

== Gallery ==
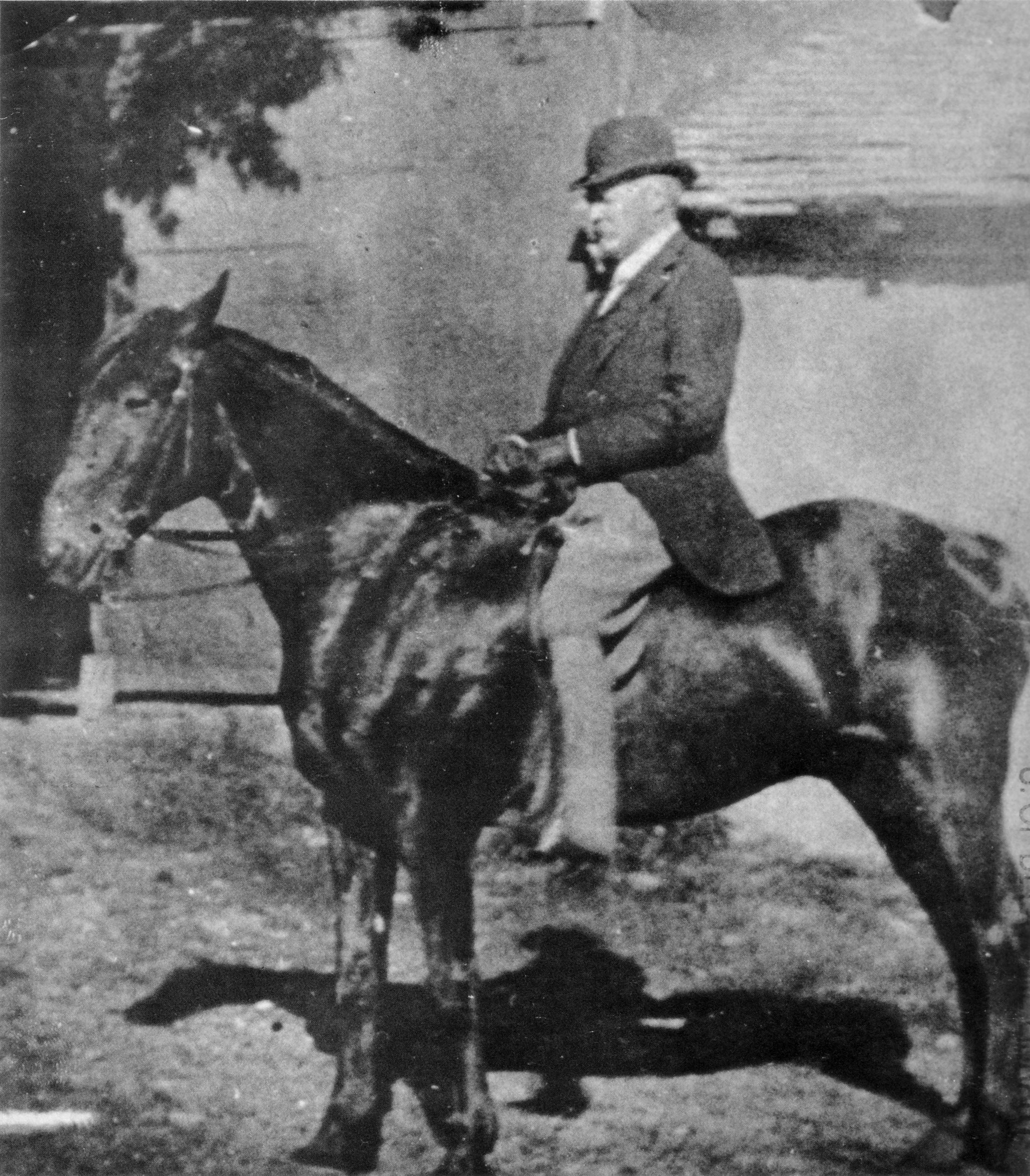
Fairman Rogers astride his mare Josephine (1878), photograph by Thomas Eakins

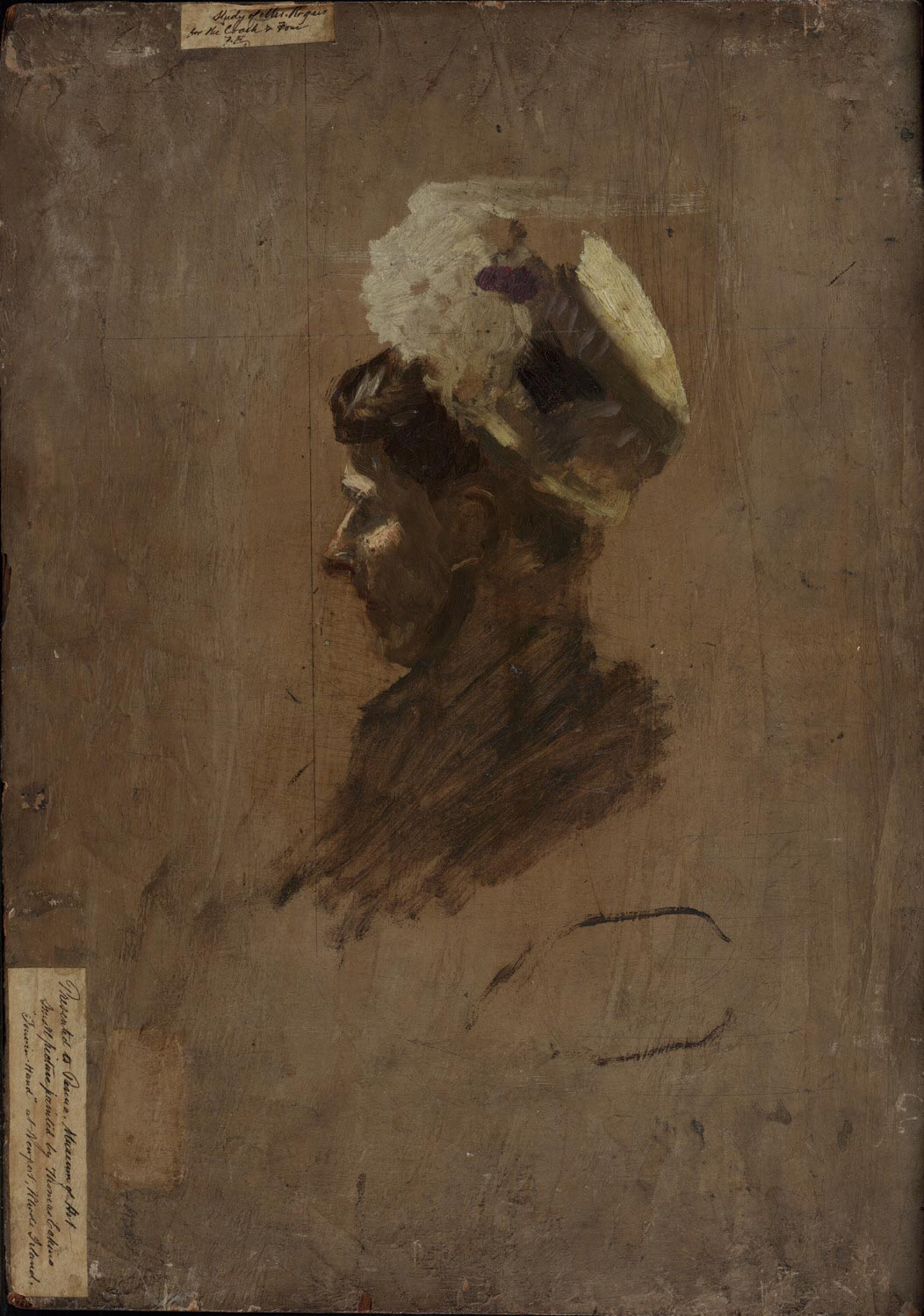
Study of Mrs. Fairman Rogers (1879) by Thomas Eakins

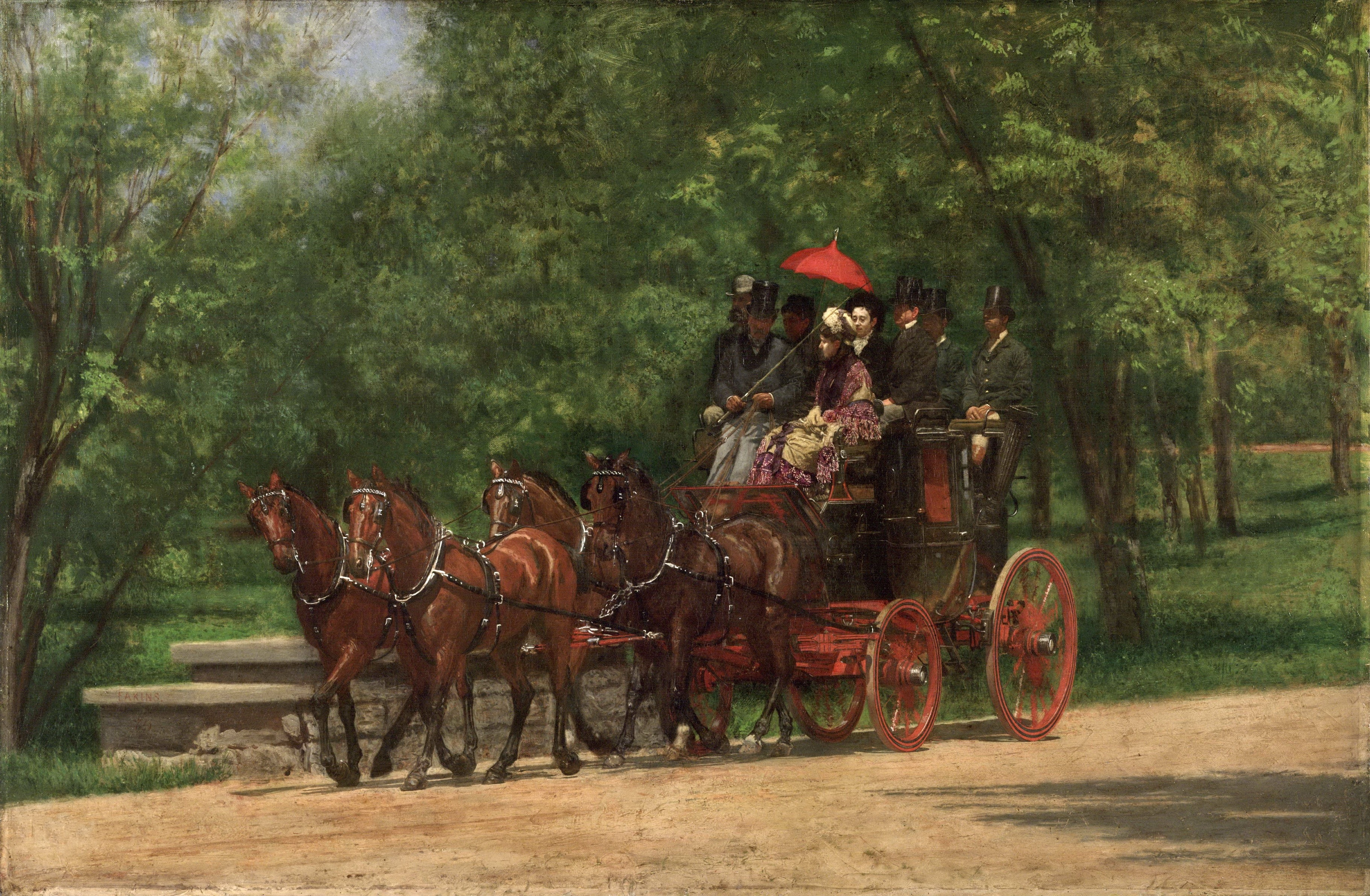
The Fairman Rogers Four-in-Hand (1879–80), by Thomas Eakins

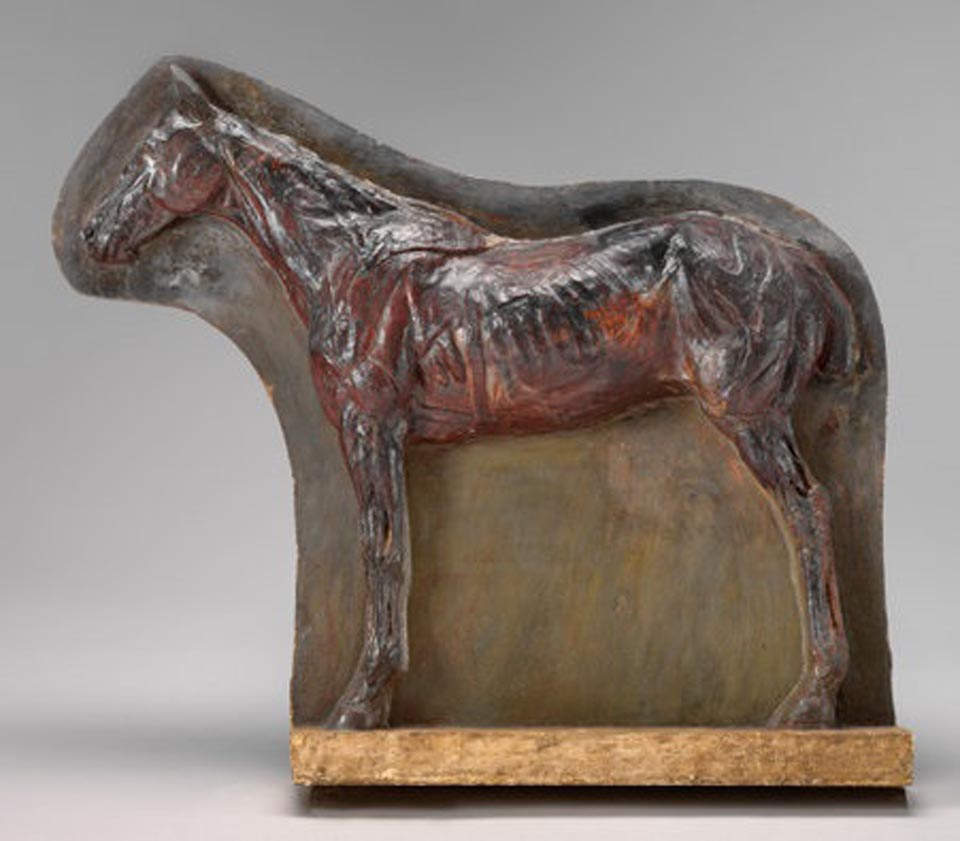
The Mare "Josephine" - Écorché (c. 1882, painted plaster), by Thomas Eakins, National Gallery of Art, Washington, D.C.

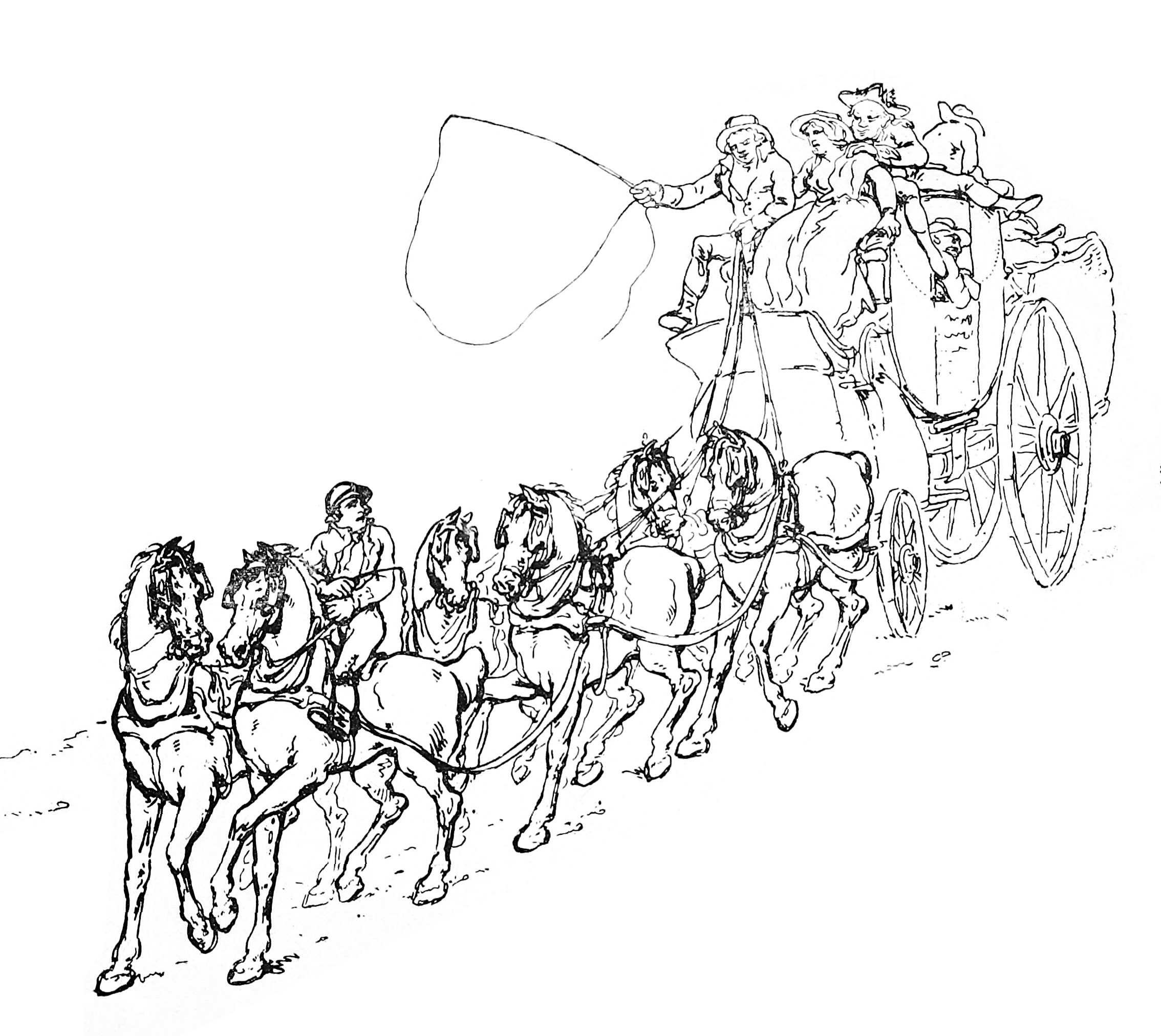
Illustration from A Manual of Coaching (1900)

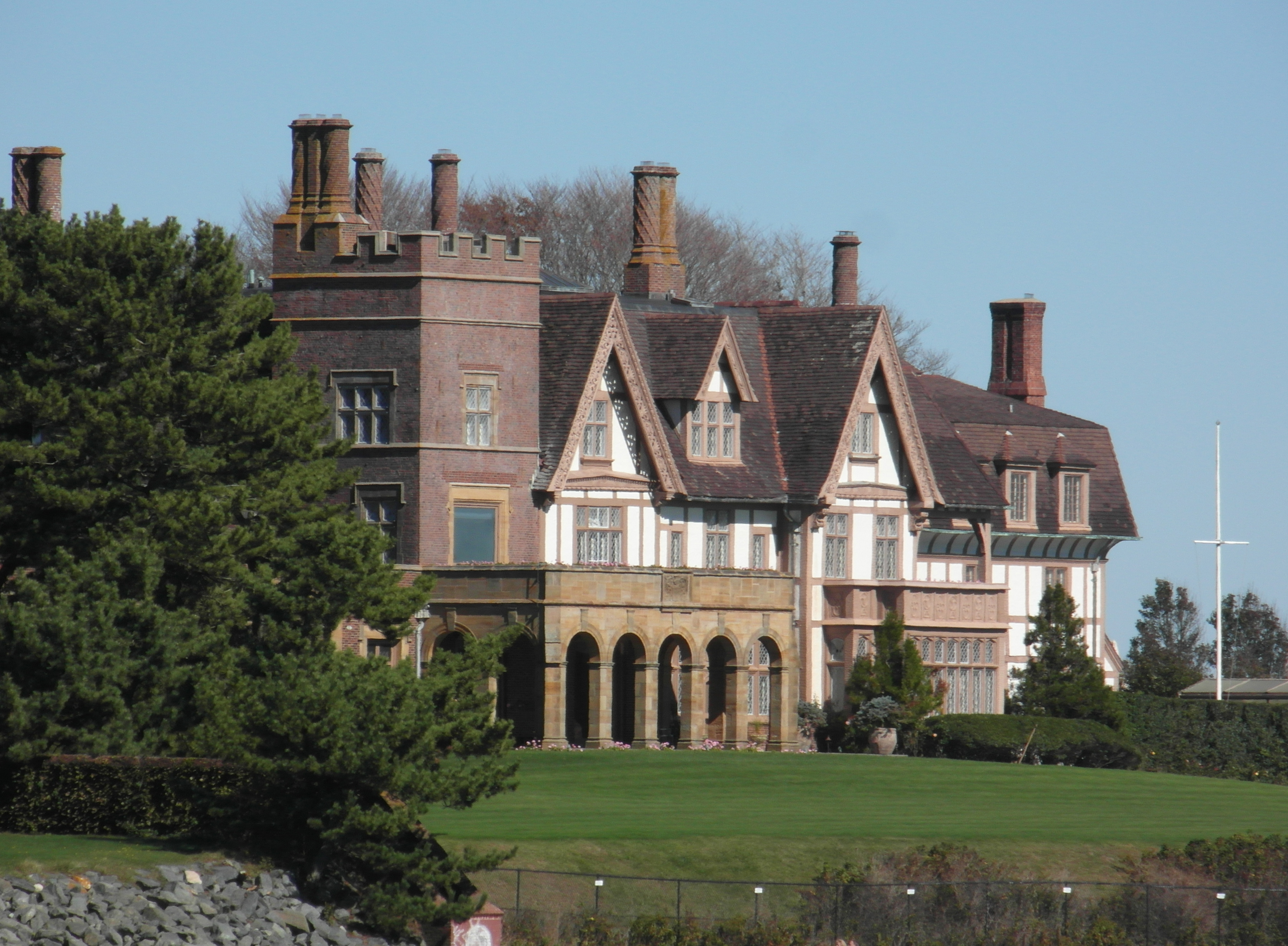
"Fairholme" (1874–75, altered), Frank Furness, architect. Rogers's summer cottage in Newport, Rhode Island.
