= The Fairman Rogers Four-in-Hand =

Painting by Thomas Eakins

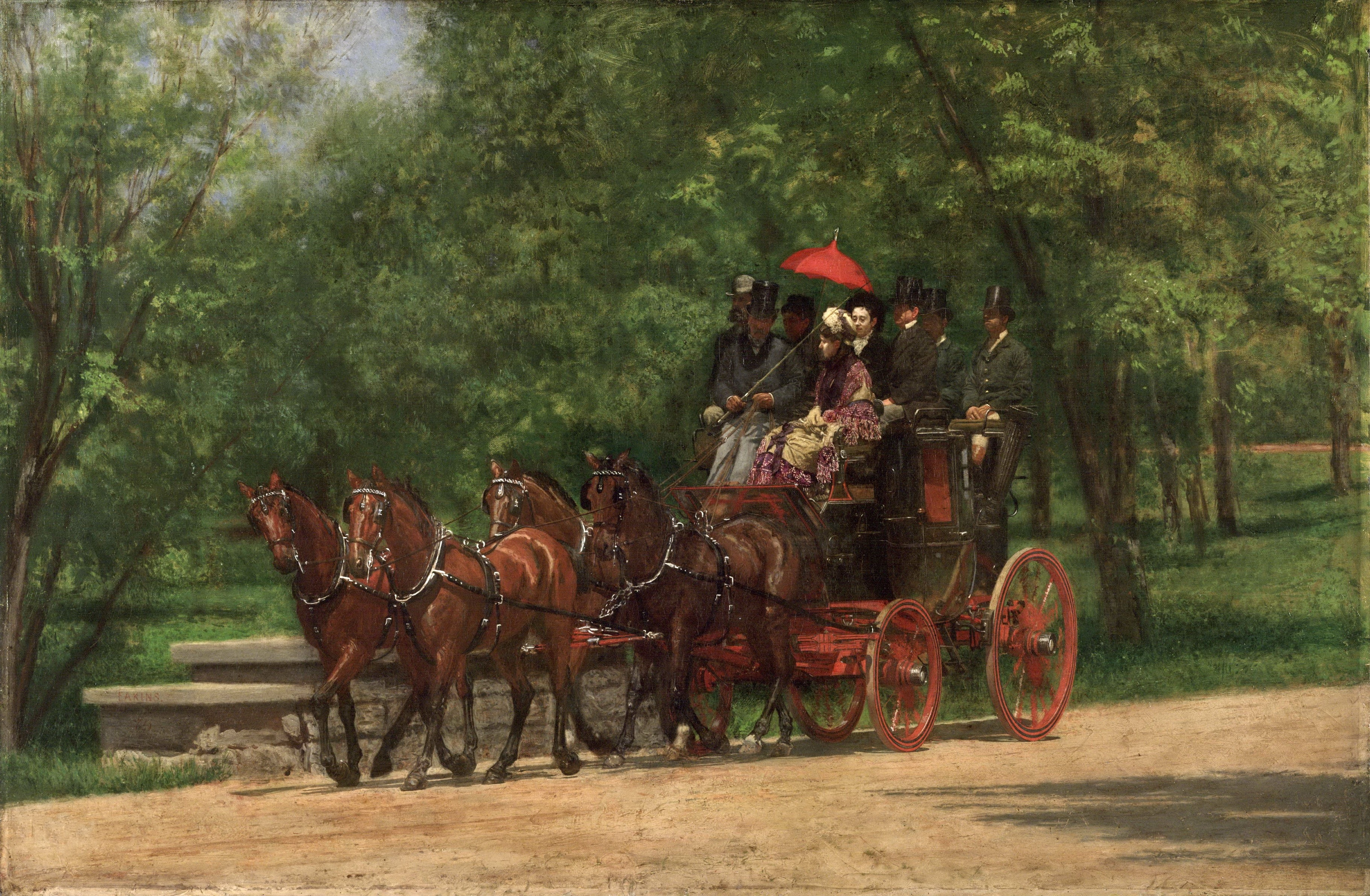
The Fairman Rogers Four-in-Hand (1879–80) by Thomas Eakins. Oil-on-canvas. 23 3/4 × 36 inches (60.3 × 91.4 cm)

The Fairman Rogers Four-in-Hand (originally titled A May Morning in the Park) is an 1879–80 painting by the American painter Thomas Eakins. It shows Fairman Rogers driving a coaching party in his four-in-hand carriage through Philadelphia's Fairmount Park. It is thought to be the first painting to examine precisely, through systematic photographic analysis, how horses move.

The Fairman Rogers Four-in-Hand is in the permanent collection of the Philadelphia Museum of Art.

== Rogers ==
Eakins taught at the Pennsylvania Academy of the Fine Arts, where Rogers was a board member and chairman of the Committee on Instruction. Rogers recruited Eakins back to the academy in 1878 and commissioned the painting from his new instructor.

Independently wealthy, Rogers was a civil engineer and retired professor at the University of Pennsylvania. He was an avid coaching enthusiast, founder of the Philadelphia Coaching Club and author of the still-definitive guide to the sport: A Manual of Coaching (Philadelphia: 1900). In the painting, Eakins combined Rogers's love of science with his love of coaching.

== Muybridge ==
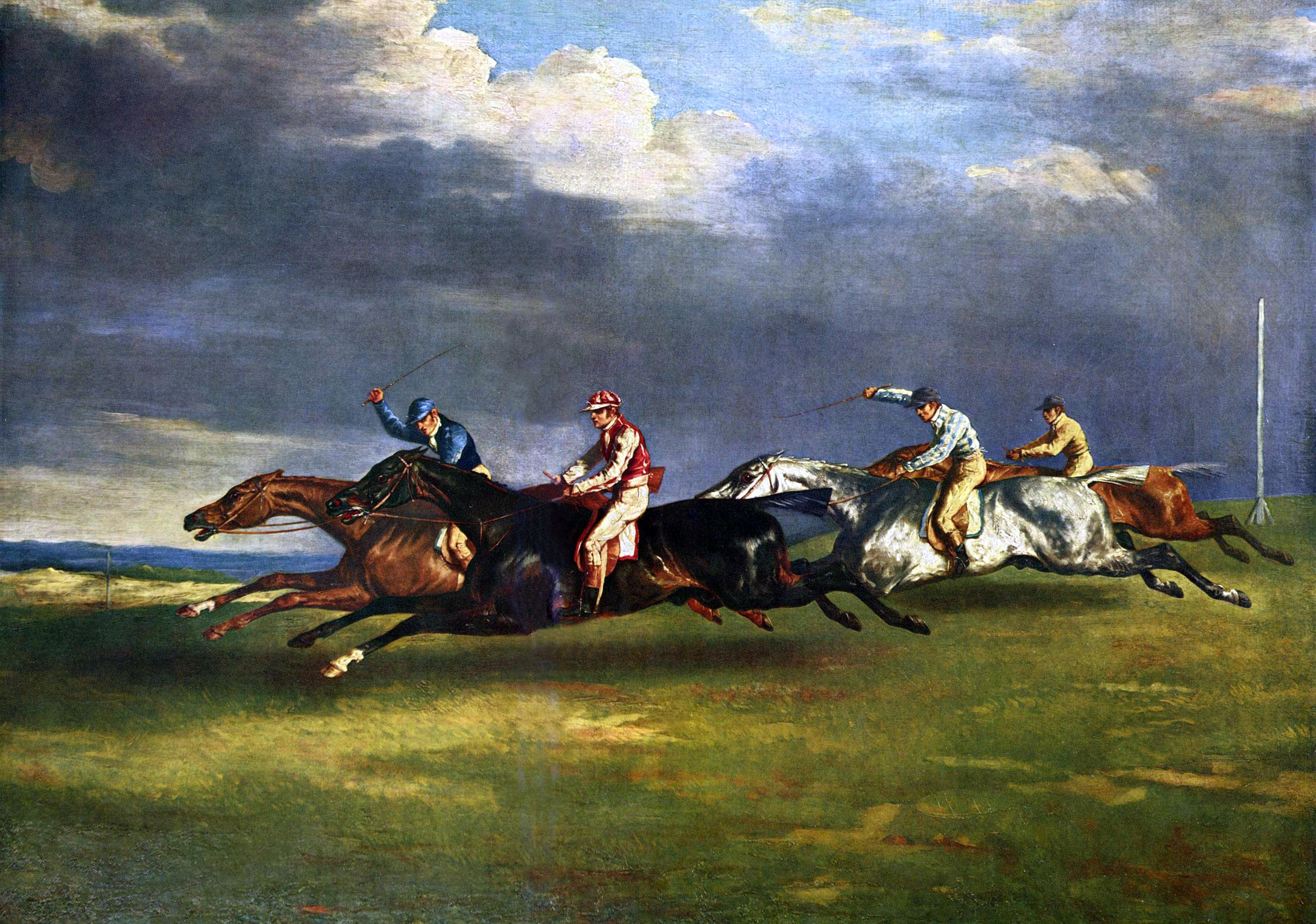
Prior to Muybridge's studies, horses were depicted with highly unrealistic gaits, such as here in Théodore Géricault's The 1821 Derby at Epsom.

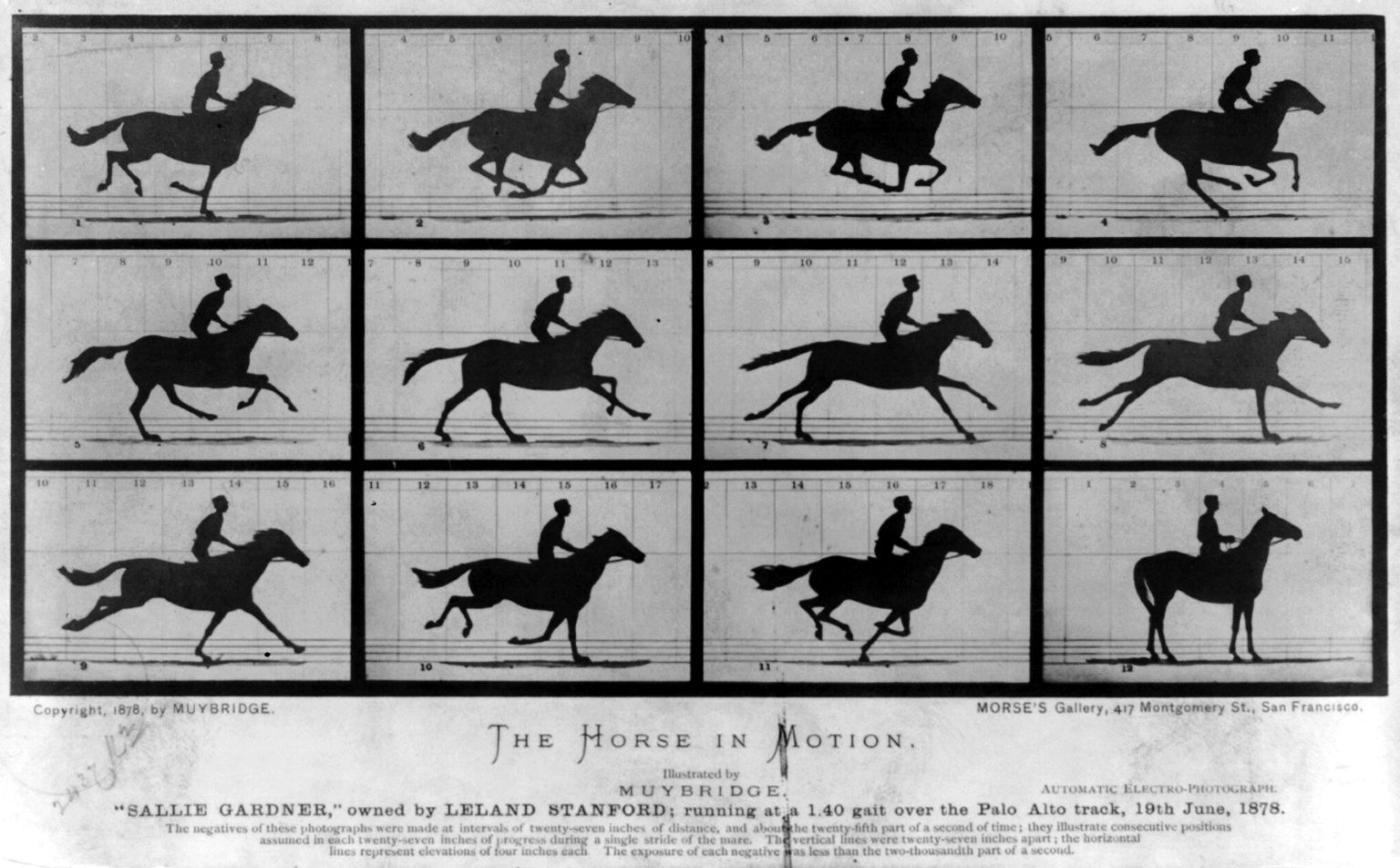
The Horse in Motion, Sallie Gardner Series (1878) by Eadweard Muybridge.

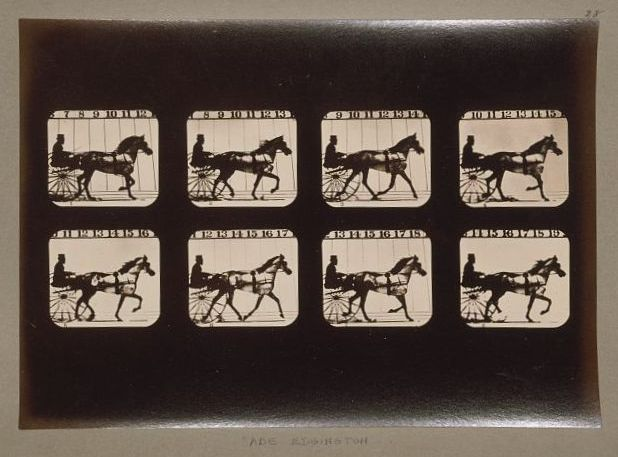
Abe Edgington Series (1878) by Eadweard Muybridge.

Both Rogers and Eakins admired and followed Eadweard Muybridge's ground-breaking work in photographing the movement of horses in motion. In 1877, Muybridge published an instantaneous photograph of the racehorse "Occident", showing for the first time just when all four hooves of a galloping horse left the ground. It was commonly taken for granted that the horse has a period of suspension in the gallop, but, as illustrated on the right, they thought it was in the extended phase of the stride. Muybridge demonstrated that it was in the contracted phase. The following year he conducted an experiment that became one of the seminal events in the history of motion pictures: The Horse in Motion.

On June 19, 1878, at a racetrack in Palo Alto, California, Muybridge positioned a row of 12 cameras set close together at regular intervals, each with a trip wire crossing the track. When the racehorse "Sallie Gardner" galloped past the cameras she tripped the wires, resulting in a short but regular sequence of instantaneous photographs shot close to 1/25 of a second apart.

Eakins studied Muybridge's published photographs and taught the new discoveries to his students at the Pennsylvania Academy of the Fine Arts. According to Eakins biographer Gordon Hendricks, seven years before Sallie Gardner was published, Rogers had attempted to photograph his own horses in motion using a camera with a shutter that rapidly opened and closed (like a Venetian blind). In 1879, Muybridge invited Rogers to witness his further experiments in California — a 7-day train ride from Philadelphia — but Rogers chose to spend the summer in Newport, Rhode Island.

Under Rogers's sponsorship, Muybridge later moved to Philadelphia and continued his experiments at the University of Pennsylvania.

== Eakins ==
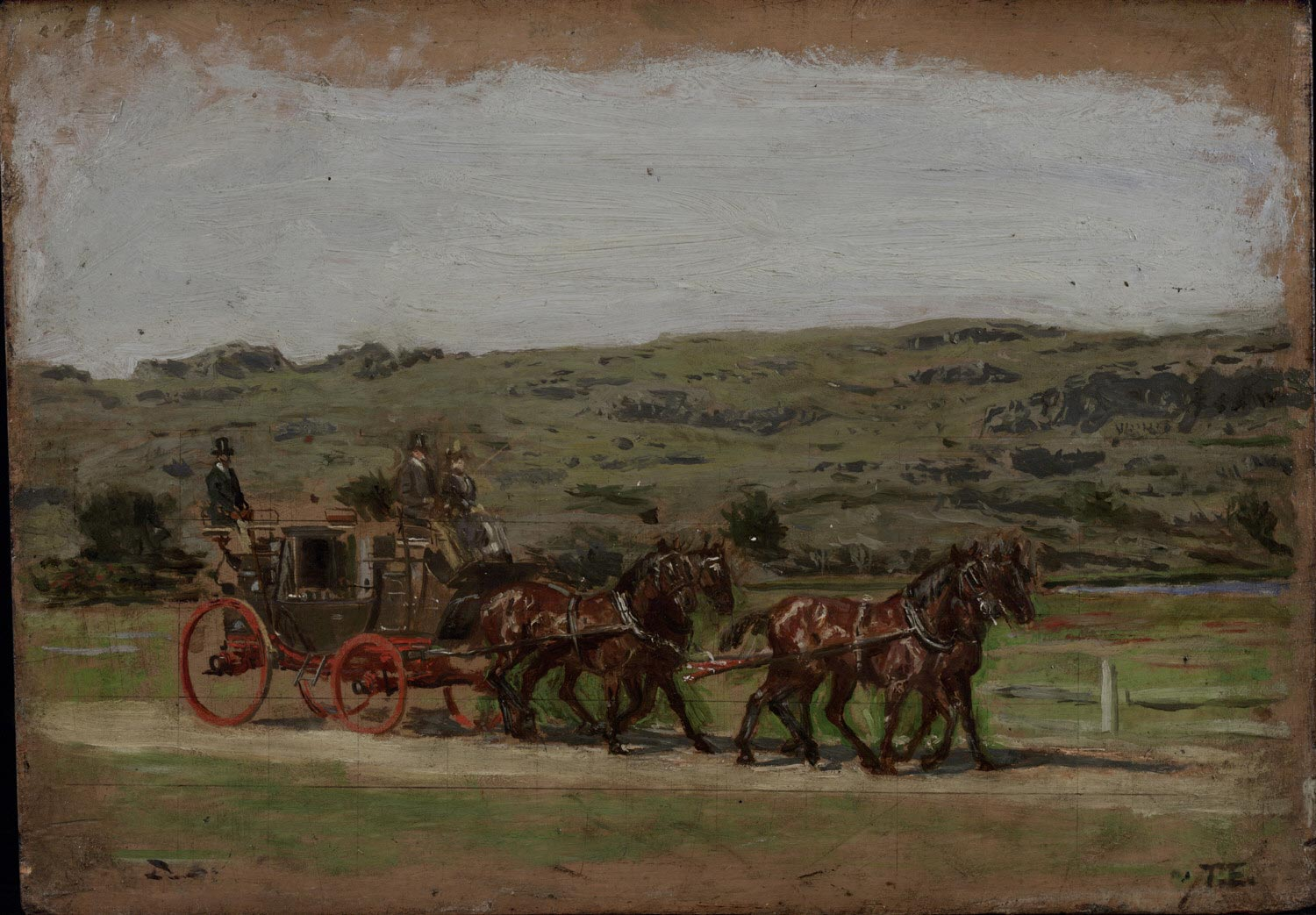
G-134. Sketch for alternate version (1879), Philadelphia Museum of Art.

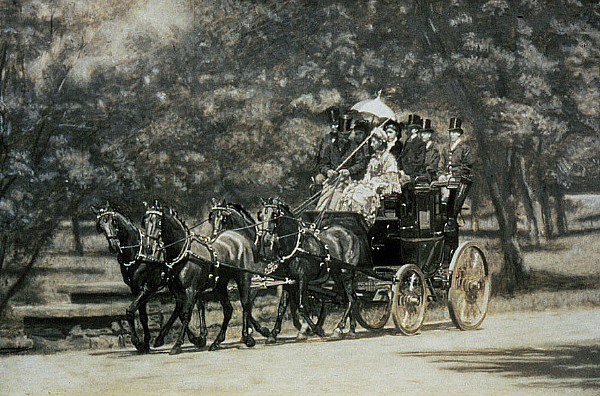
G-320 Black and white replica (1899), Saint Louis Art Museum.

Eakins probably visited Rogers in Newport in the summer of 1879, and did visit in September, when he may have painted the sketch of Rogers driving his coach through a rocky landscape. It is believed that while in Newport Eakins created wax models of Rogers's horses with their poses based on another set of Muybridge photographs — the "Abe Edgington" Series (1878), showing a trotter pulling a sulky. Eakins painted individual studies of Rogers's horses, possibly both in Newport and Philadelphia. A year earlier, he dissected a horse with his Academy students, and may have relied on those anatomical notes. In the sketch, the animal's hooves are more tentative than in the finished painting. Eakins painted a replica of the sketch that he made into a fan for Mrs. Rogers (private collection).

Eakins set the finished painting in Philadelphia's Fairmount Park, at a location just north of Memorial Hall. He populated the work with more figures and inverted the coach's direction so as to set it at a sharper angle which better showed the horses' hooves. The sketch shows Rogers, one passenger and a groom. The painting shows Mr. and Mrs. Rogers, four passengers on a bench behind them, and two grooms at the rear of the coach. Eakins likely made studies of each of the people; two of these studies survive. He worked through the fall and winter of 1879 through to the following spring. Theodor Siegl conjectures that the landscaped background may have been the last element to be painted, possibly in as late as May 1880.

Once he resolved to show the horses' hooves frozen in motion, Eakins was confronted with the problem of the coach's wheels. In the sketch, he blurred the spokes of the wheels, the traditional way for artists to indicate motion, but this conflicted with his intention to show an instantaneous view of the hooves. He seems to have gone back and forth about this — artist Joseph Pennell reported that Eakins at first "drew every spoke in the wheels, and the whole affair looked as if it had been instantaneously petrified." In the end, Eakins made the same compromise of logic as in the sketch: freezing the horses' hooves, but blurring the spokes of the coach's wheels.

In 1899, Eakins painted a black and white replica to be photographed as an illustration for Rogers's A Manual of Coaching (1900).

== Critical reception ==
Rogers paid Eakins $500 for the painting, and exhibited it at the Philadelphia Society of Artists in November 1880. The reviews were respectful, but generally unfavorable, noting the inconsistency between the hooves and spokes, and using this point as a springboard to lecture about the superiority of Art over Science. Eakins was trying something new and while some understood and appreciated the attempt, when first exhibited the painting was not regarded as successful.

According to Hilton Kramer (1985), "...The Fairman Rogers For-In-Hand is a surpassingly dull painting... The painting lacks what for Eakins was always the essential element in art: moral imperative. Representational accuracy, "scientific" or otherwise, was a necessary co-efficient of this moral imperative in art, but it was not itself a sufficient basis for it."

== Preparatory works ==
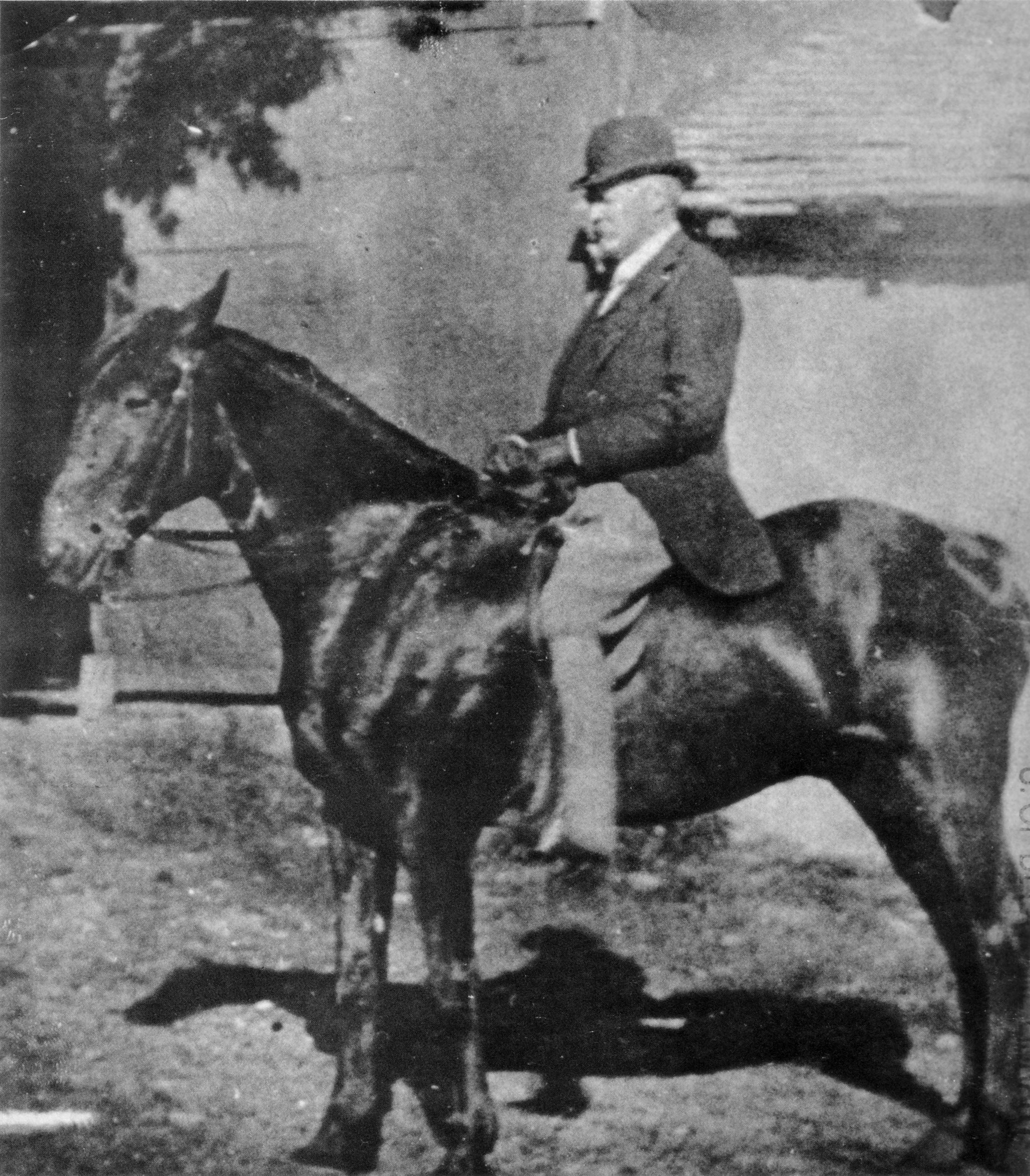
H-3. Photograph of Fairman Rogers riding his mare "Josephine" (circa 1878), attributed to Thomas Eakins.

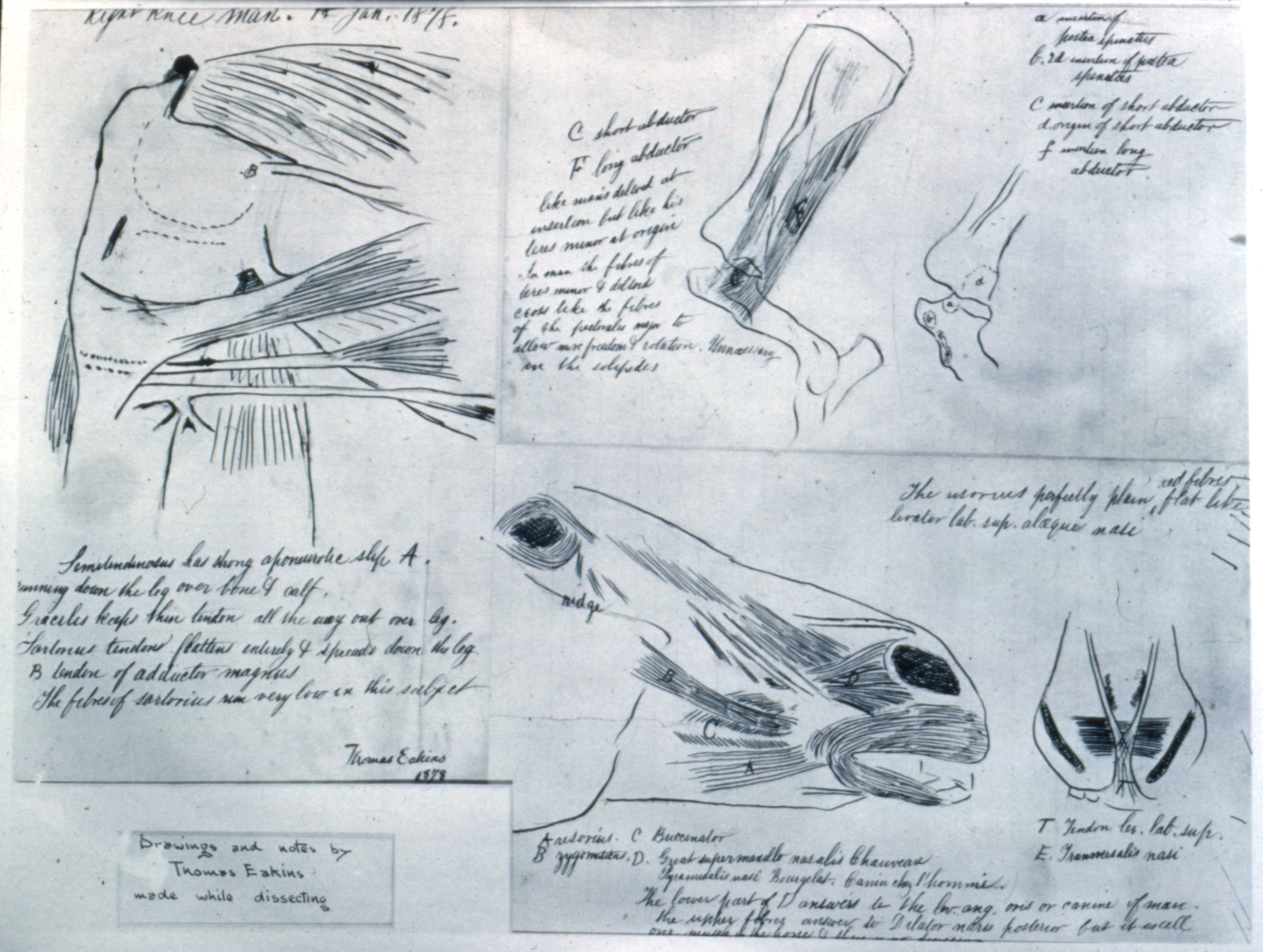
G-130A-C. Anatomical notes on a Horse (1878), Hirshhorn Museum and Sculpture Garden.

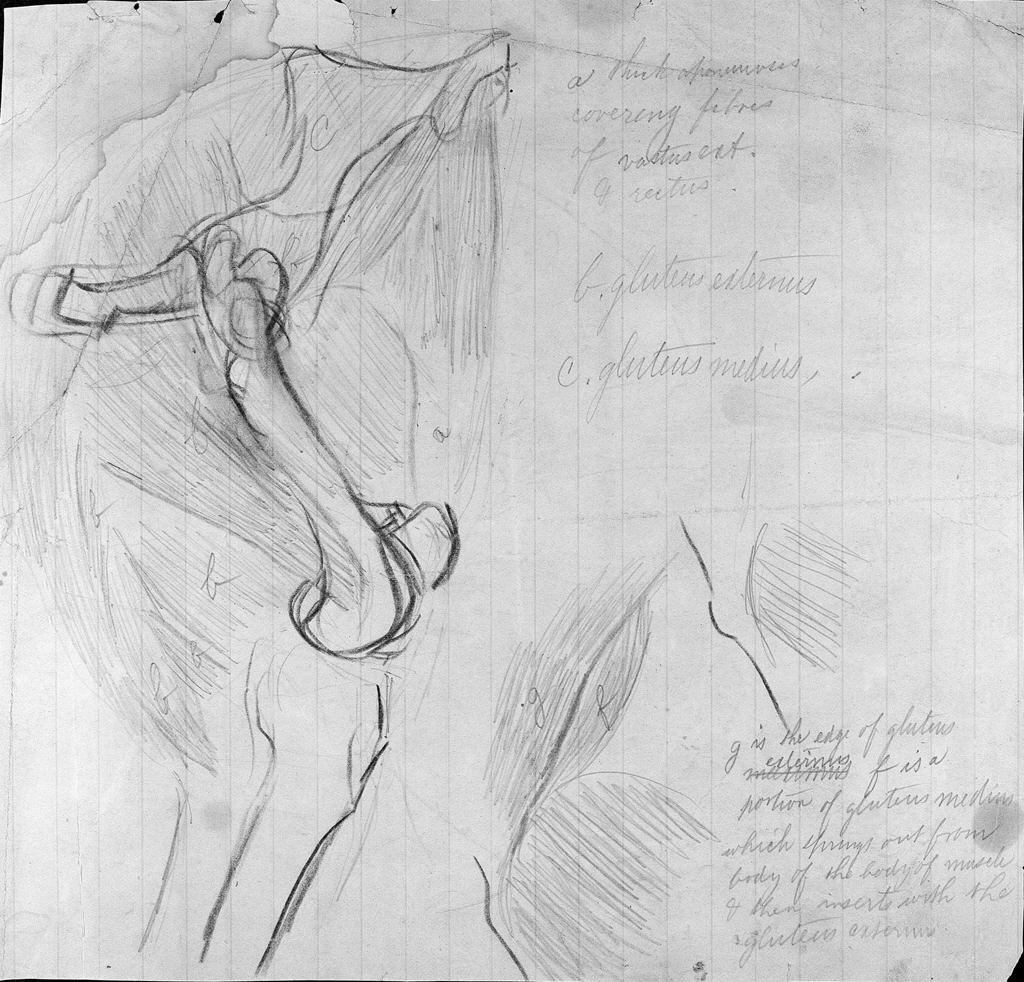
G-130D. Anatomical notes on a Horse (1878), Hirshhorn Museum and Sculpture Garden.

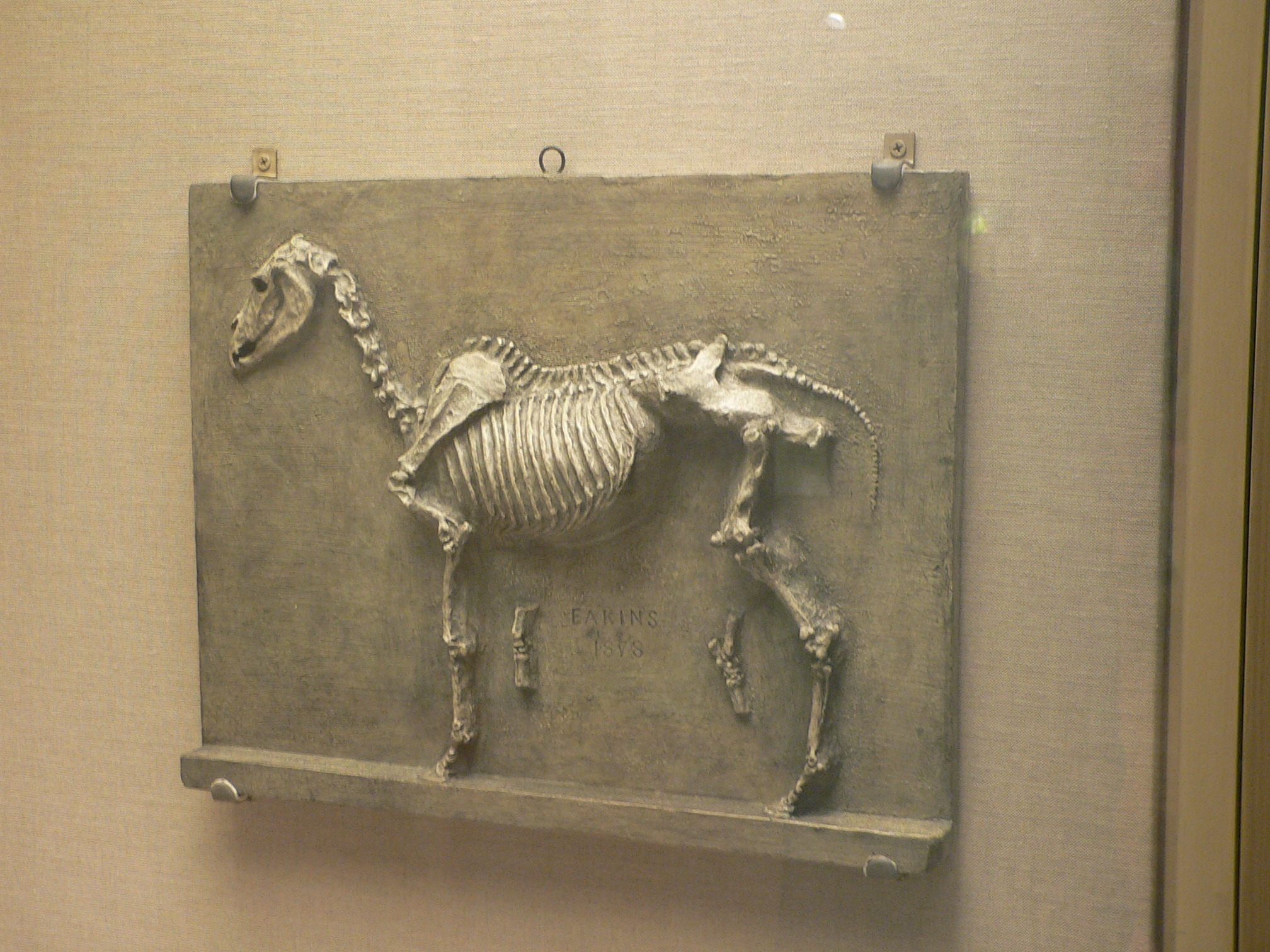
G-500. Relief plaque of a horse's skeleton (1878), Philadelphia Museum of Art.

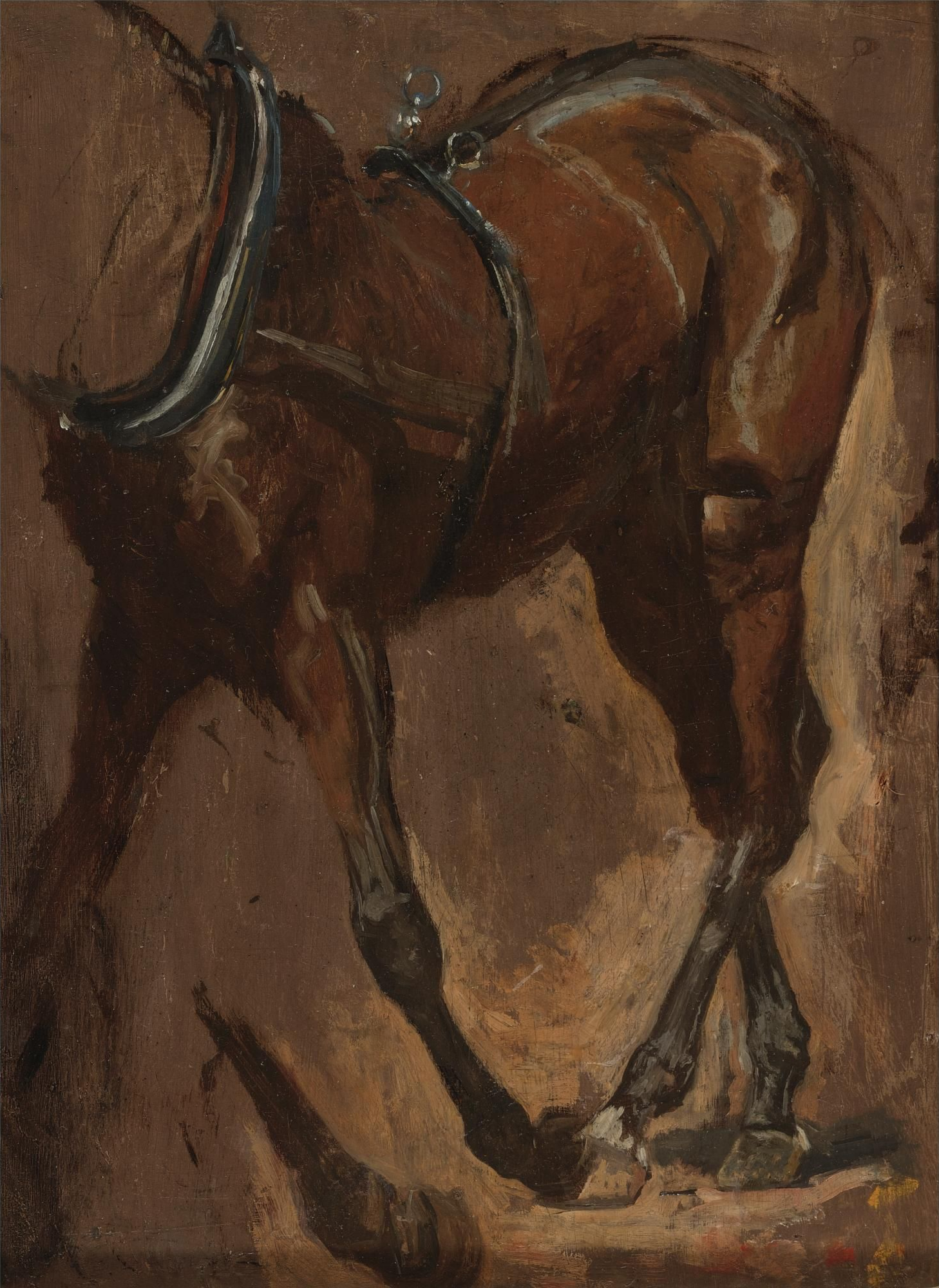
G-137. Study of a Horse (1879), ex collection: Hirshhorn Museum and Sculpture Garden.

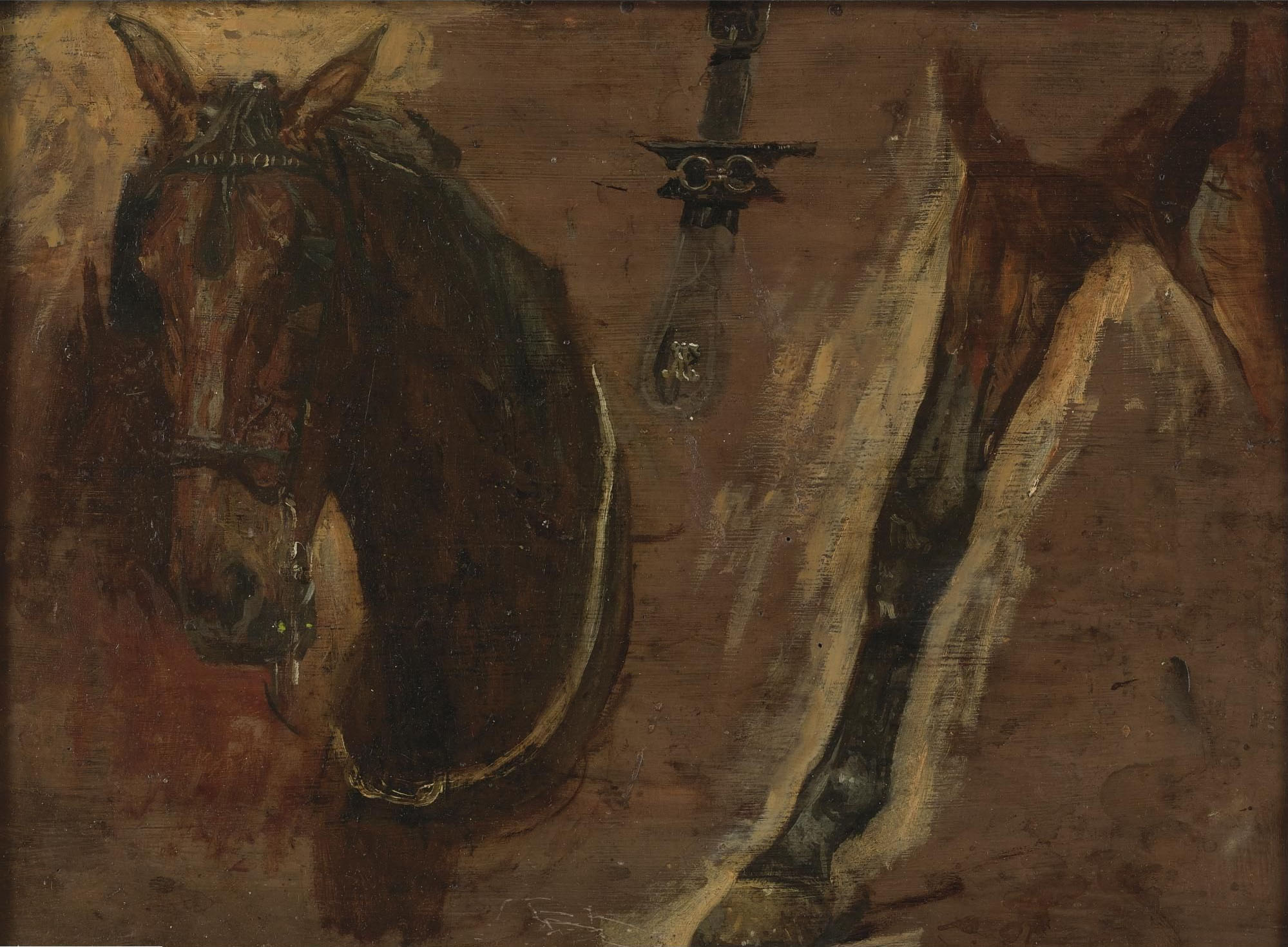
G-137 (verso). Study of a Horse (1879), ex collection: Hirshhorn Museum and Sculpture Garden.

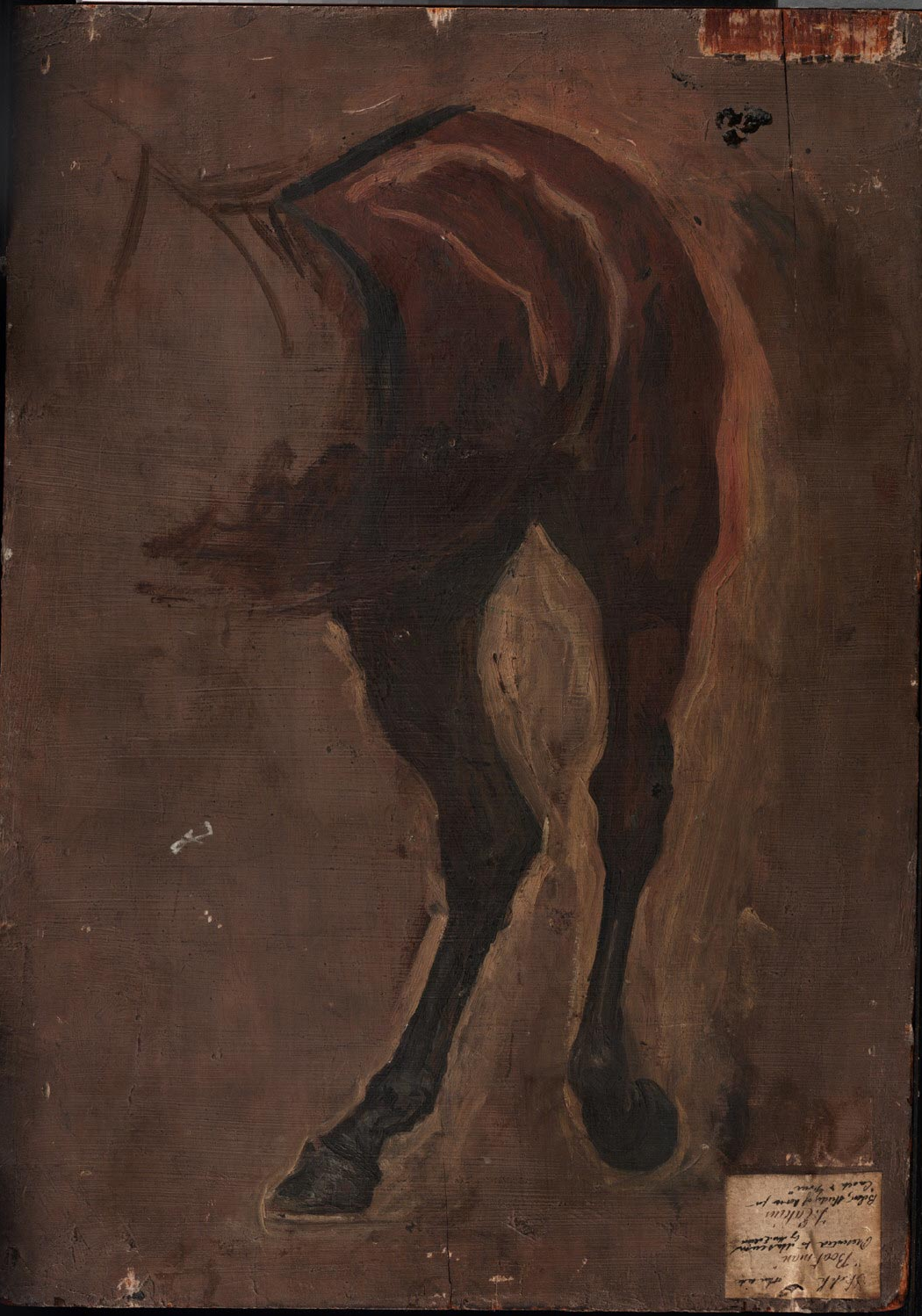
G-182 (verso). Study of a Horse (1879), Philadelphia Museum of Art.

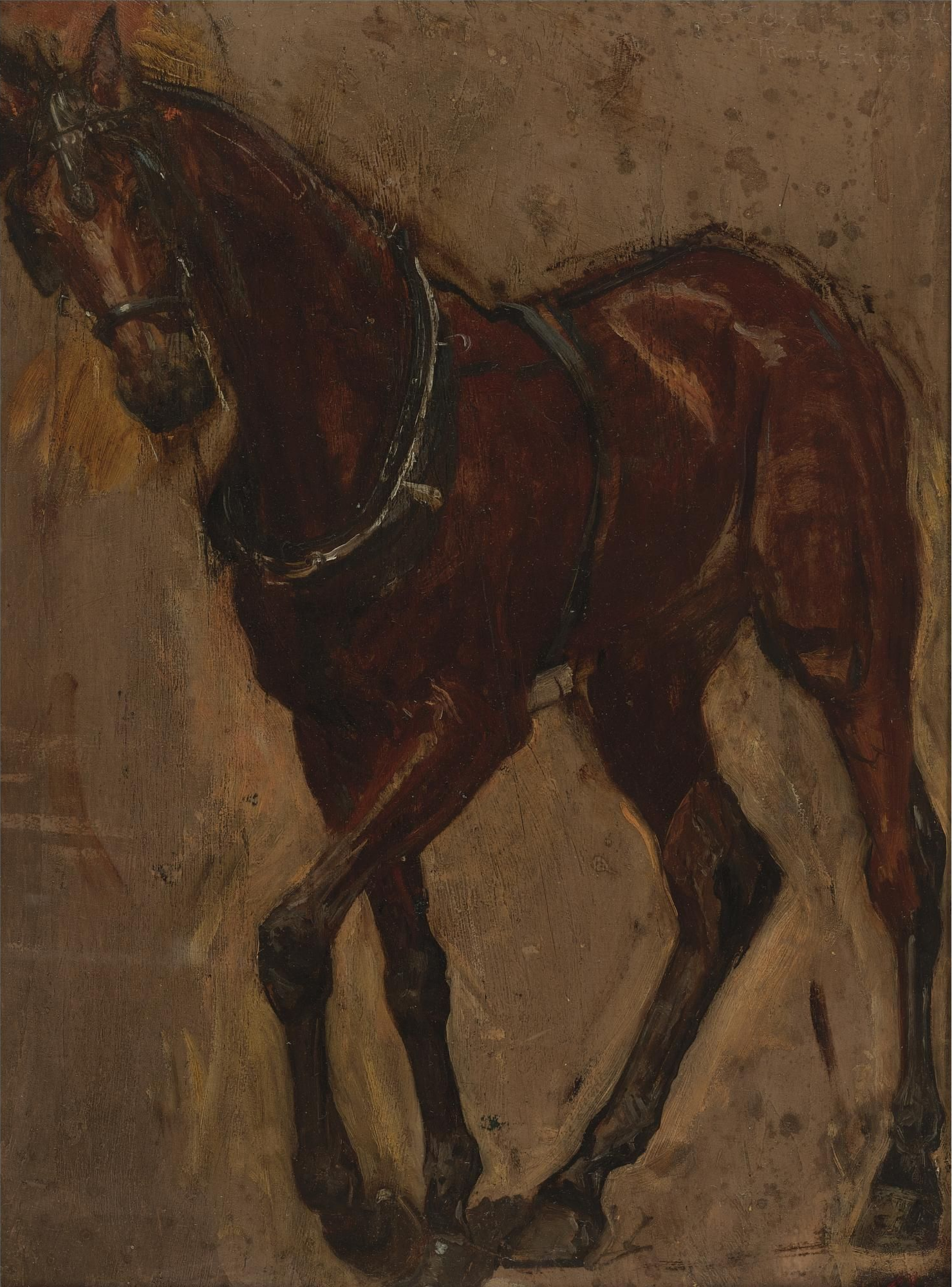
G-199 (verso). Study of a Horse (1879), ex collection: Hirshhorn Museum and Sculpture Garden.

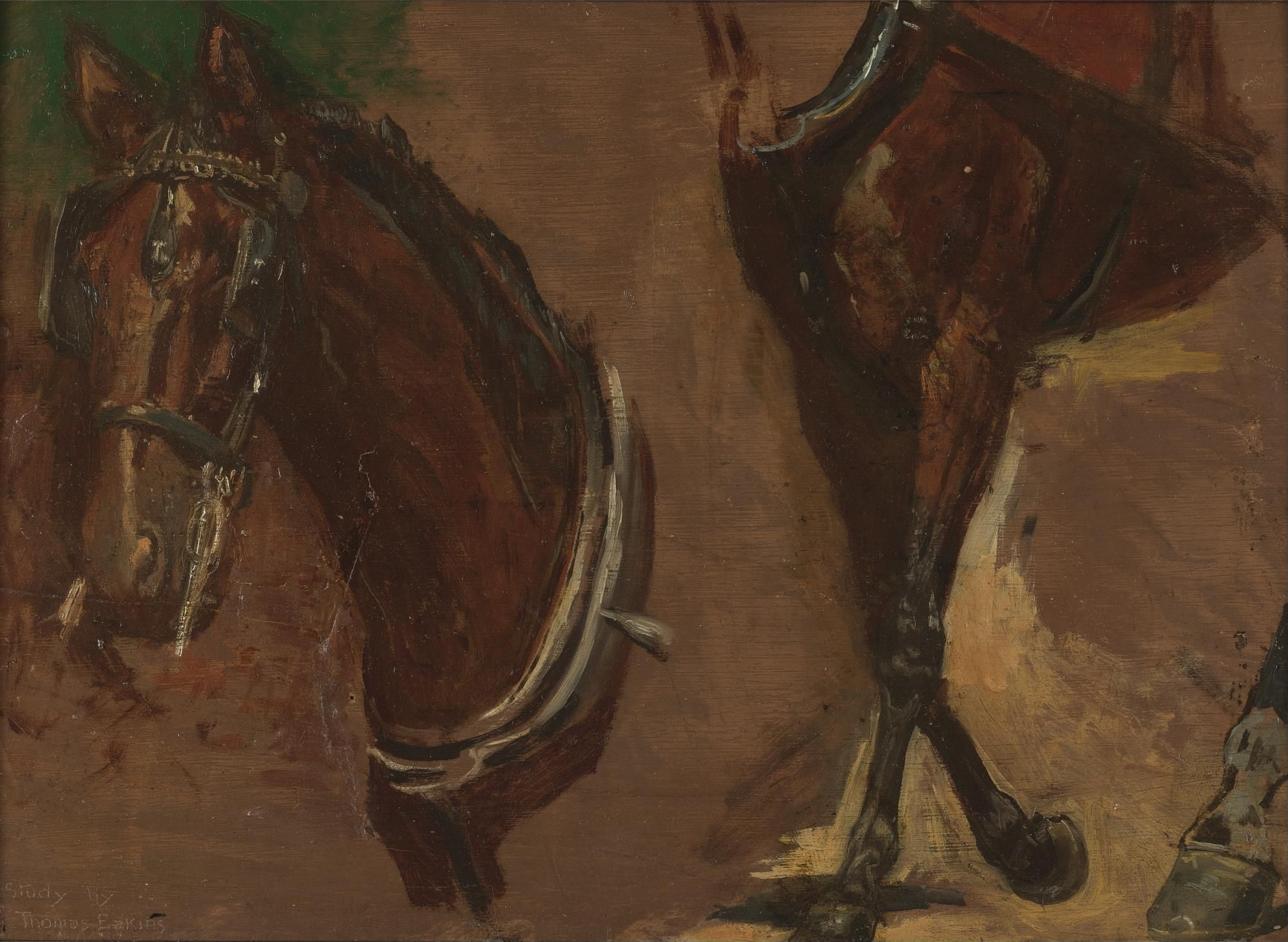
G-201 (verso). Study of a Horse (1879), ex collection: Hirshhorn Museum and Sculpture Garden.

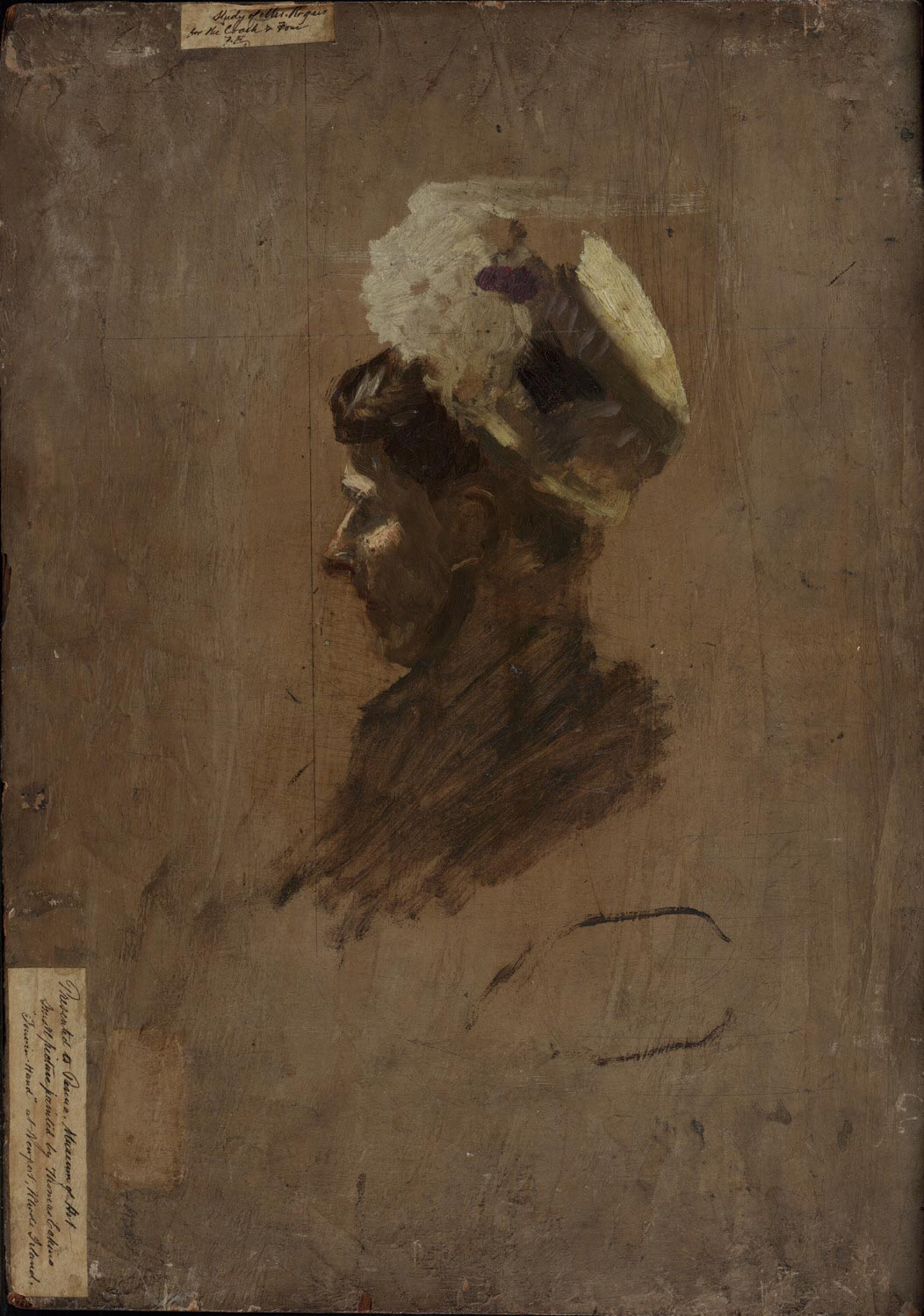
G-134 (verso). Study of Mrs. Rogers (1879), Philadelphia Museum of Art

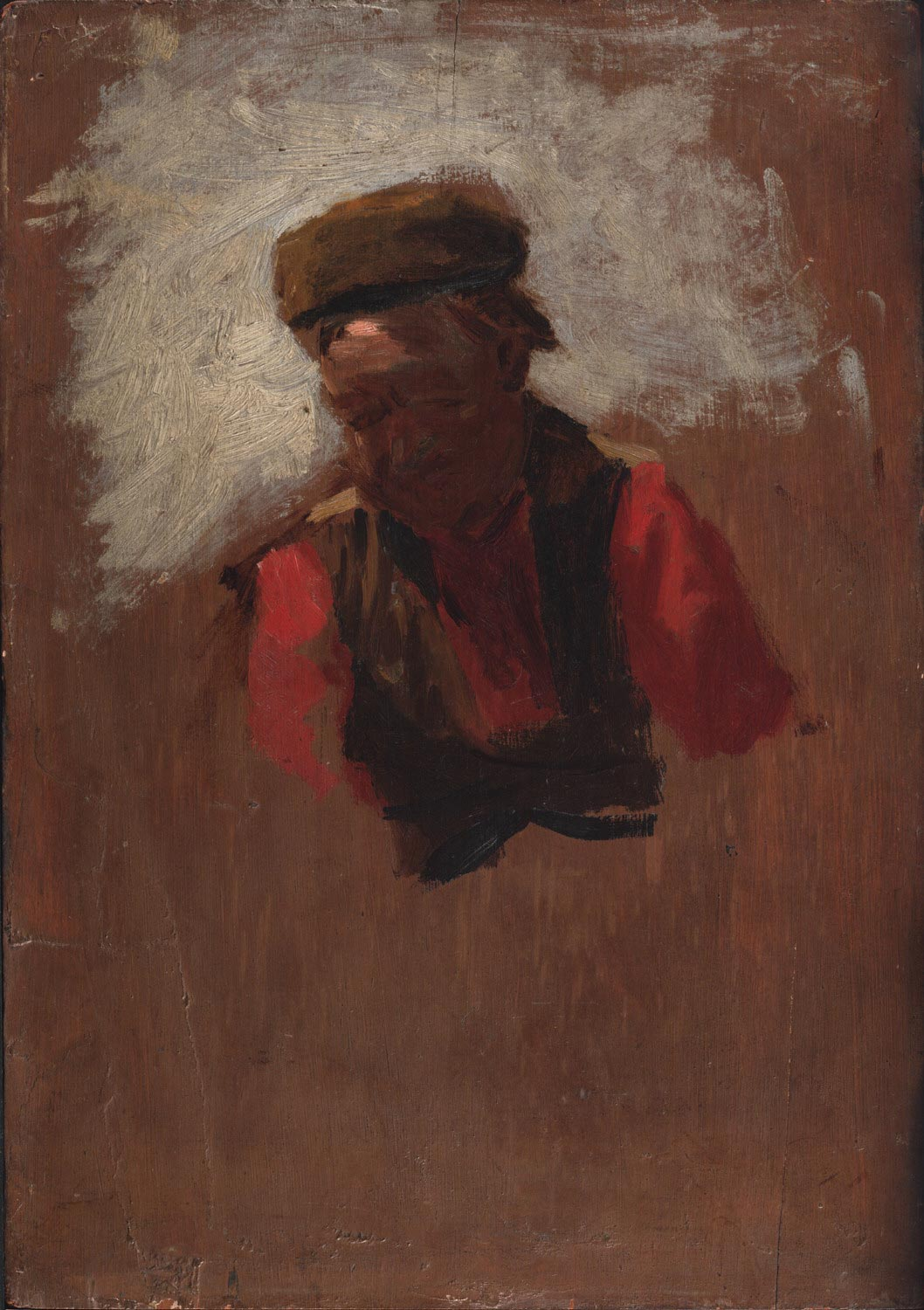
G-182. Study of a Groom (1879), Philadelphia Museum of Art.

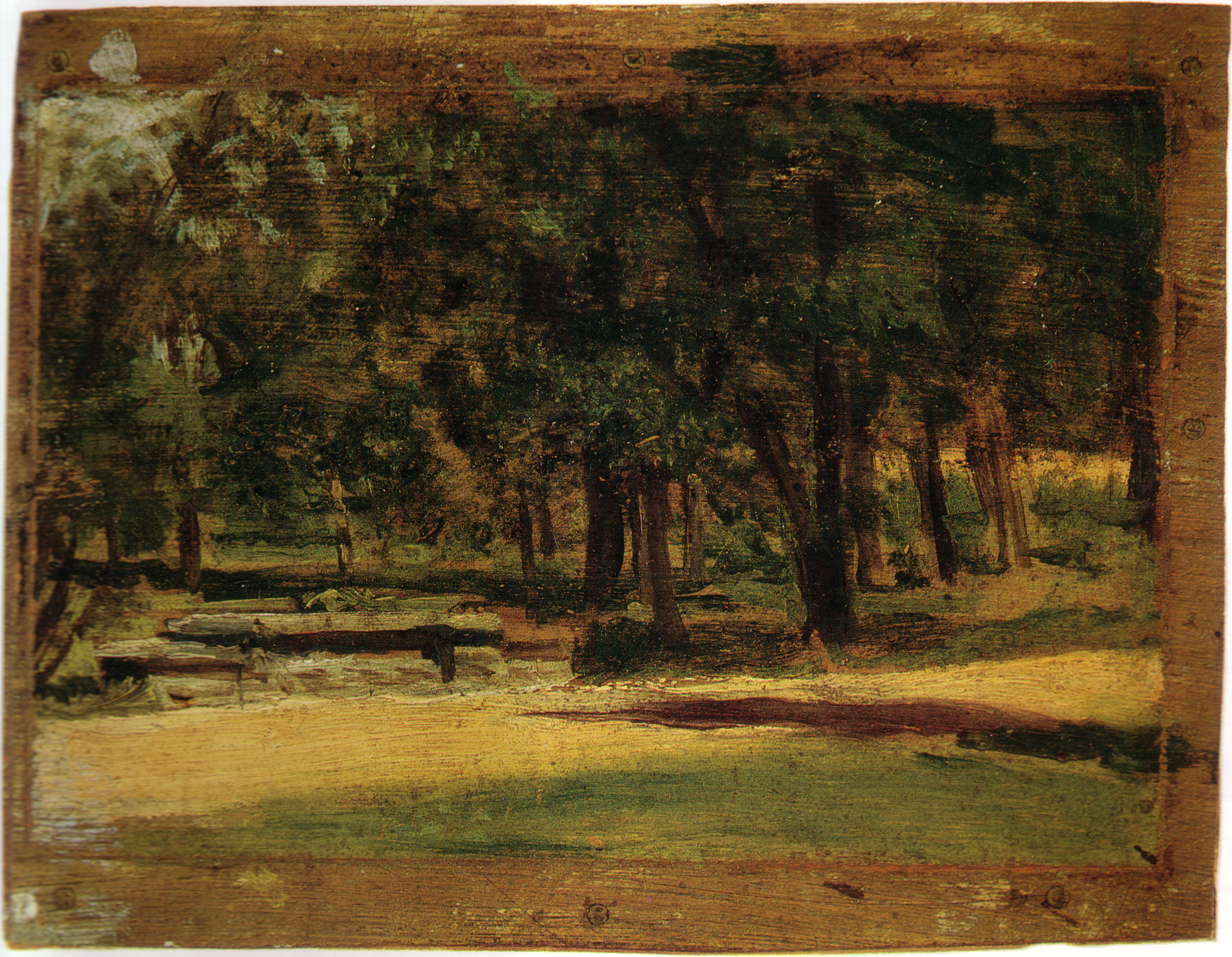
G-135 Landscape sketch of Fairmount Park (1879 or 1880), Pennsylvania Academy of the Fine Arts.

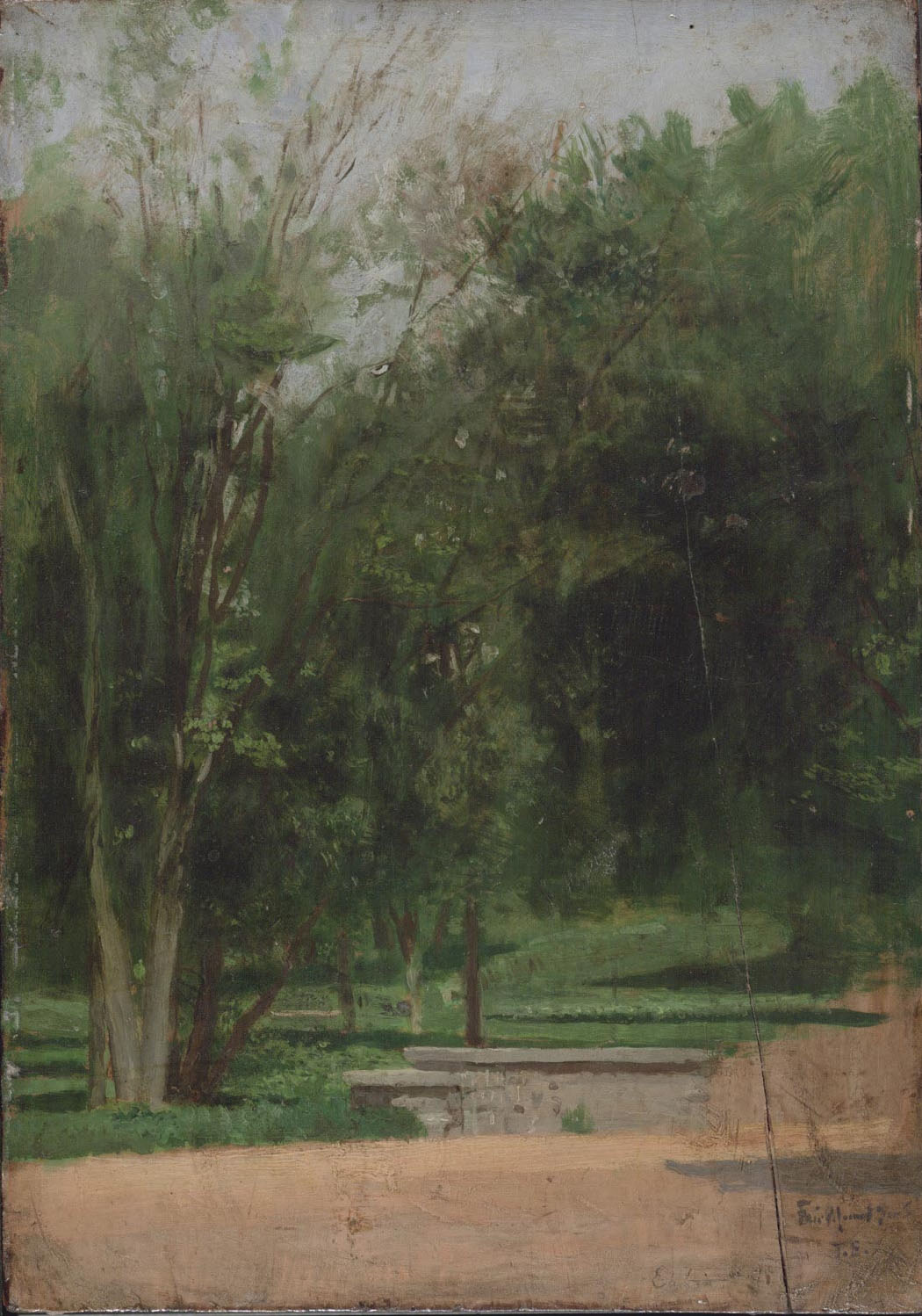
G-136. Landscape study of Fairmount Park (1879 or 1880), Philadelphia Museum of Art.

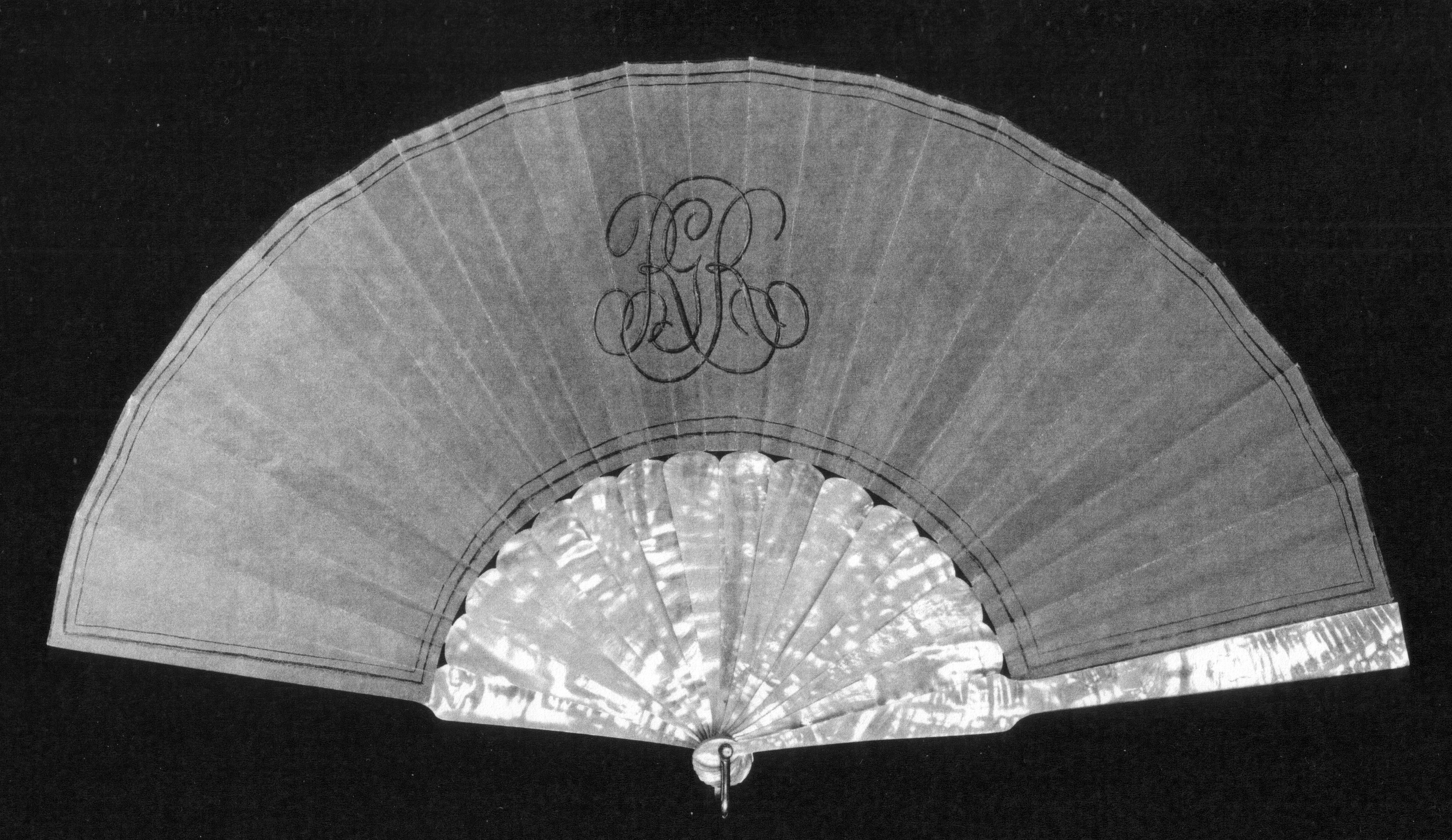
G-137B. Fan created by Eakins for Mrs. Rogers, private collection. The verso has a replica of G-134.

== See also ==
- List of works by Thomas Eakins
