= James Harrington (Yorkist knight) =

Member of the Parliament of England

Sir James Harrington
- Arms of the Harrington family of Hornby
- Born: c. 1430
- Died: 22 August 1485; Battle of Bosworth Field
- Spouse: Elizabeth
- Issue: John (possibly illegitimate)
- Parents: Sir Thomas Harrington (father); Elizabeth Dacre (mother)

Sir James Harrington of Hornby KB (c. 1430 – 22 August 1485) was an English politician and soldier who was a prominent Yorkist supporter in Northern England during the Wars of the Roses, having been retained by Richard Neville, 5th Earl of Salisbury, who was brother-in-law to the head of the House of York, Richard of York. He was the second son of Sir Thomas Harrington, who had died with the king's father at the Battle of Wakefield in December 1460. James himself had fought with Salisbury at the Battle of Blore Heath in 1459, where he had been captured and imprisoned by the Lancastrians until the next year. He was a significant regional figure during the reign of King Edward IV, although the early years of the new king's reign were marred by a bitter feud between him and the Stanley family over a castle in Lancashire. On the accession of King Richard III in 1483, he was appointed to the new king's Household, and as such was almost certainly with him at the Battle of Bosworth Field two years later. It is likely that he fell in battle there, although precise details of his death are now unknown.

== Early years ==
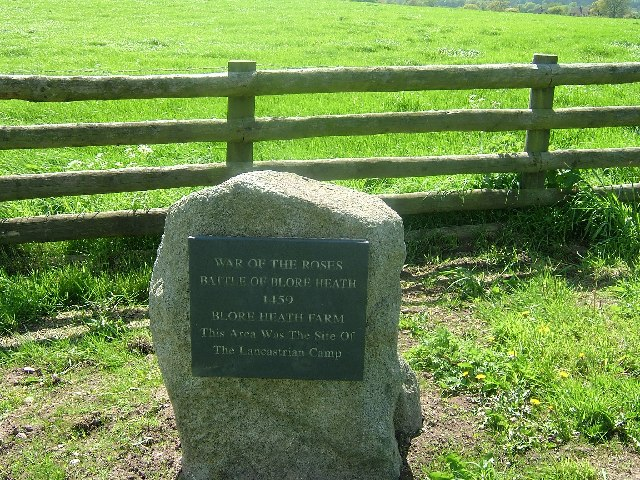
Site of the Battle of Blore Heath, 1459

His family held extensive estates in both Yorkshire and Lancashire, as did one of the biggest noble families of the region, the Nevilles. Between the late 1450s and 1460s the Harringtons had a close relationship with them: "The Harrington brothers [were] feed by Warwick, and their father had been feed by Salisbury," as Rosemary Horrox has pointed out. He was a retainer and councillor to Richard Neville, 16th Earl of Warwick, and was granted duchy of Lancaster leases by him, with his father, Sir Thomas. He was in the Earl of Salisbury's army when it was ambushed by the Lancastrian Lord Audley near Blore Heath, in Shropshire, on 23 September 1459. Although a Yorkist victory, Sir James and his father, along with Warwick's brother John Neville were captured after the battle, at Acton Bridge, and sent to Chester Castle. Harrington was pardoned on 29 March 1460, but Neville was not to be released until the Yorkist victory at the Battle of Northampton in July 1460. However, with James's elder brother John, Sir Thomas later died with Richard, Duke of York at the Battle of Wakefield on 30 December 1460. Following the victory of Edward IV at the Battle of Towton on Palm Sunday, 29 March the next year, Sir James was made the King's escheator for Yorkshire. Following his death, Sir Thomas's feoffees transferred his estates, that his daughters were due to inherit, to James in 1463, a decision that would consume the next eleven years and ultimately have grave consequences for James and his family. On 13 July 1465 he assisted with the capture of the by-now fugitive Henry VI by being the instrument of persuasion that induced Sir Thomas Talbot of Bashall, and Sir Richard Tempest of Bracewell, who were sheltering the King, to betray him. For this he received one hundred marks (£66) for expenses, and a reward of one hundred pounds.

== Feud with Lord Stanley ==
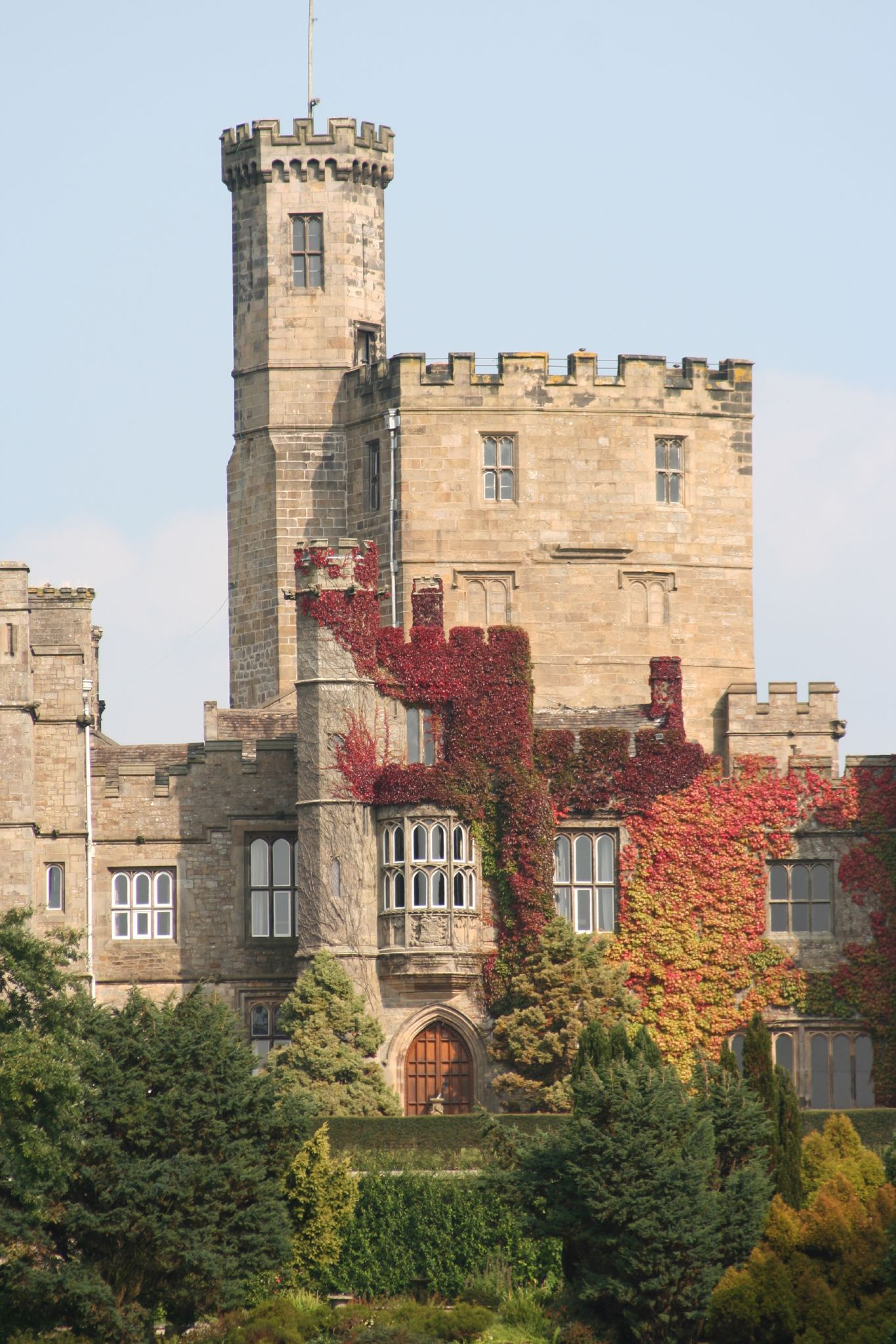
Hornby Castle, Lancashire, the focus of the feud with the Stanley family

When James's brother Sir John Harrington fell at Wakefield, he left as his heirs his two daughters, Elizabeth and Anne, who were four and five years old at the time, which meant their wardship was automatically in the hands of the Crown to dispense. Edward duly did so, to Thomas, Lord Stanley in November 1461, but James and his brother Sir Robert, in attempt to keep the inheritance for the family, effectively disallowed the King's grant and imprisoned (or, kept in custody) the two girls, as Anthony Goodman noted, "contrary to their will, in divers places." Along with the girls, Sir James also seized Hornby castle, Lonsdale, which was the chief residence contained in the inheritance, but which also included Brierley, and some manors originally granted him by his father's feoffees, including George Neville, in 1463. The dispute was more complicated than merely theft and kidnapping. Harrington claimed that, in law, his father's estates were held in tail male, in which case they could only be passed through the male line and the actions of Sir Thomas's feoffees would be illegal, and the inheritance remain with him; Stanley, however, claimed them to be held in fee simple, viz through the female line as well. In October 1466, Stanley obtained a grant to sue in the King's Court, but the matter was not dealt with until 1468, when a commission found against Harrington and he and his brother were committed- "temporarily", Ross noted- to the Fleet Prison.

The political crisis between Edward and the earl of Warwick between 1469 and 1471 put the legal case on hiatus. During the readeption of Henry VI in 1470, they held Hornby against Stanley, who as yet had been unable to take possession of it. On 5 March 1471, Warwick showed himself willing to take Stanley's side, and despatched the royal cannon Mile Ende from Bristol to help him besiege Hornby castle.

When Edward returned from exile on 14 March 1471, Harrington was one of the first (and one of the few) northern knights to openly join him, meeting him at Doncaster (or possibly Nottingham) with 600 men-at-arms and Sir William Parr. After Edward's victories at the Battles of Barnet and Tewkesbury in April and May respectively, at which Harrington may have fought, the case was reheard the next year. By April 1472, the King was involving himself personally and imposed a settlement. Harrington still did not, as Ross has put it, "give up"- even though the award was in Stanley's favour. Harrington, in the face of a royal commission in June, was still in possession of Hornby, having "stuffed and enforced it with men and victuals and habitements of war;" said a contemporary chronicler; the Harringtons still occupied it in August 1473, when Edward was forced to send his Sheriff to condemn their actions as being "in contempt of his lawes," as the record said. Although they were eventually forced to surrender Hornby to Edward Stanley, they retained Farleton and Brierley. Harrington remained in the King's favour, and accompanied him on the 1475 invasion of France, to which he brought twelve men-at-arms and one hundred archers. He was appointed to a Commission of the peace for the West Riding of Yorkshire the same year; the most obvious reason for this being, Ross suggests, was that they were still "trusted Yorkist servants" and the King had a reluctance to alienate his own supporters.

Stanley, having finally gained possession of the girls along with a grant of their marriageability, promptly used it, and married them off to his relatives, for example, Anne was married to his fifth son, Edward, and Elizabeth to John Stanley, his nephew.

Throughout the dispute, Harrington resided at his manors of Farleton and Brierley, and was given permission to crenelate the latter in 1480.

== Relations with Richard III ==
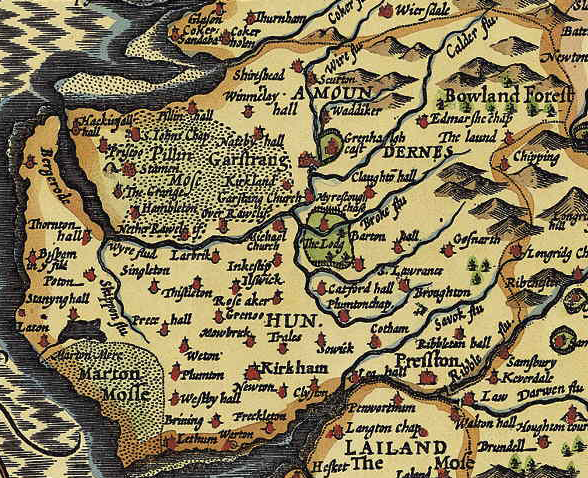
Hundred of Amounderness, and Bowland

His connection with Gloucester, who aided him in his feud with Stanley, in late 1469, when the duke of Gloucester, as he then was, was appointed forester of Amounderness, Blackburn, and Bowland, and Harrington was Steward of Amournderness hundred. He then became Gloucester's deputy-Steward for Bowland. Following Edward's successful 1471 campaign, he was retained by Gloucester and became a member of his personal council, which put him in proximity to the King. He served with Gloucester on his border campaigns of 1480 and 1482. Horrox has suggested that Richard's accession in 1483 gave the Harrington the opportunity to re-open the inheritance dispute, and "by implication" intended to have it re-adjudicated in their favour. As she points out, they were by now fully committed to Gloucester's Affinity (to the extent that James's brother Robert was involved in the arrest of William, Lord Hastings on 13 June 1483), and James was appointed chief forester of Bowland in February 1485.

== Death ==
Sir James Harrington was not mentioned by any contemporary chroniclers as being present at Bosworth on 22 August 1485, and this has led some historians to believe he was present but survived. However, the Harrington family tradition holds that he died there, and the later Ballad of Bosworth Field claimed he, with other northern knights, brought "a mighty many" there; he was certainly excluded from the general pardon of 1486 and attainted in 1487. He then disappears from the records. According to Rosemary Horrox, there are no more references to any "James Harrington", except his Cambridge-educated nephew who fought for the rebel earl of Lincoln at the Battle of Stoke, was attainted and then pardoned before becoming Dean of York and dying there in 1512.

As a Knight of the Body, and a member of the King's Household, it is likely that Sir James Harrington took part in Richard's fatal charge, and may have been his standard bearer. If he did survive the battle, it seems probable that he was dead by 1488, having been "admitted to allegiance" in 1486, proposed J.R. Lander, but dying "too poor, it is said, to pay Chancery clerks for his pardon." Ultimately, says Horrox, "even if James senior survived, the family had been extinguished as a force."

== Family ==
Sir James Harrington had a (possibly illegitimate) son, John, whom he made his heir before departing on the Scottish campaign of 1480, and whom Richard III had made an esquire of the household. His widow Elizabeth wrote to her second husband some time after Bosworth expressing the belief that the boy had been poisoned ("a little before [or] or more probably a little after" that battle, reports Baldwin) by her ex-brother-in-law Edward Stanley, who, having received James's estates from his attainder, wished to ensure that John would not be able to seek its reversal. Horrox also notes that John was "reputedly poisoned."

The irony with his feud with Thomas Stanley is that they were cousins, both being great-grandsons of Nicholas Harrington.

== Official positions and titles ==
- High Sheriff of Lancashire 1466-7 and 1475-6
- Steward of Bradford 1471
- MP for Blackburn 1467–8, and in 1478 (his brother Robert had held the same seat in 1472–5)
- Knight of the Body to Edward IV from 1475 and Richard III on his accession
- Vice-constable of England, 1482
