= Thomas Harrington (died 1460) =

English northern knight (died 1460)

Sir Thomas Harrington of Hornby (died 1460) was a 15th-century English northern knight. He was originally a loyal servant of the Lancastrian crown, but gave his loyalty to Richard of York in the early years of the Wars of the Roses, and died in battle in his service.

== Early years and service to the Crown ==
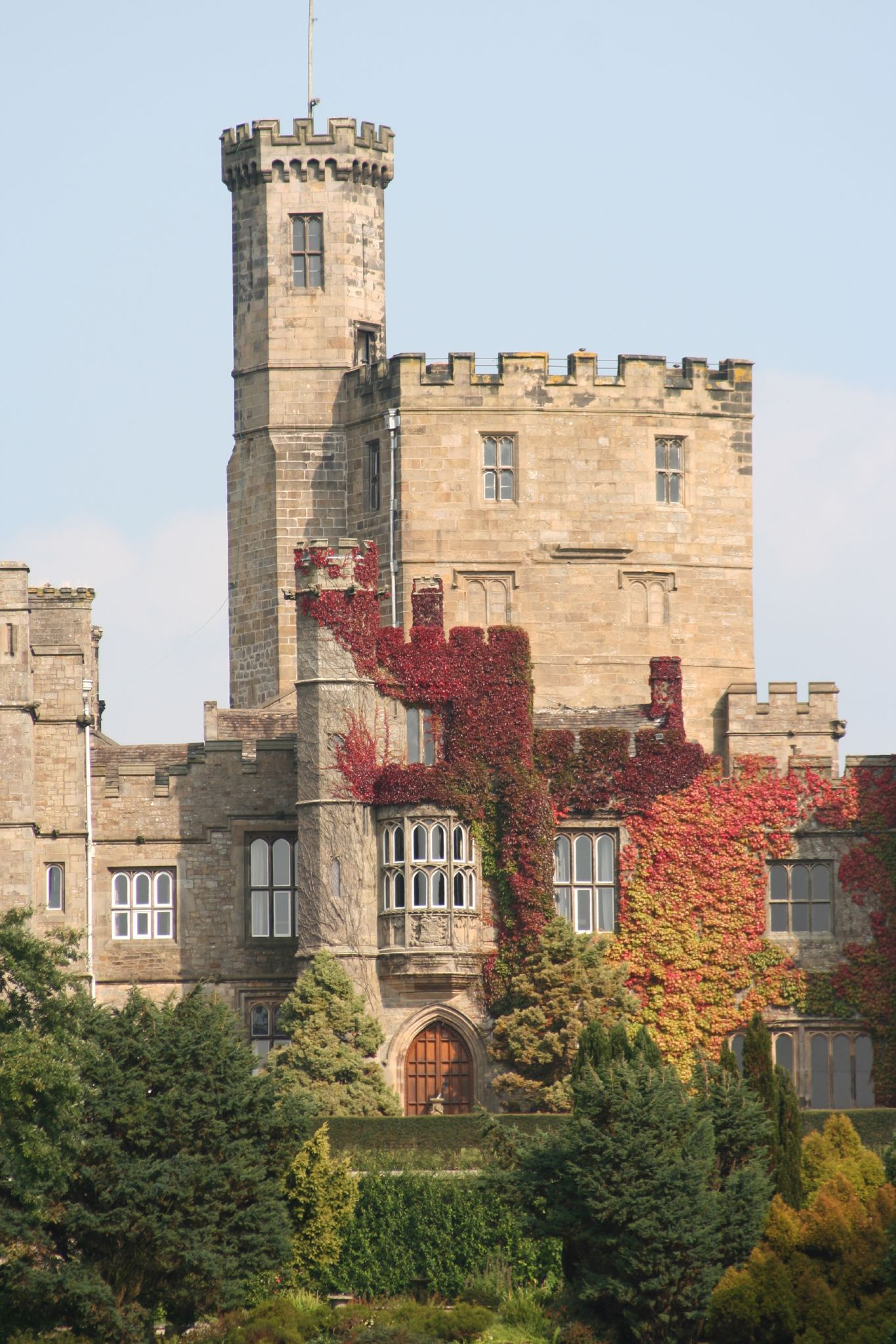
Hornby Castle, Lancashire, the Harrington family's caput, seen in 2005.

Thomas was the son of Sir William Harrington (died 1440). In 1419 Thomas married Elizabeth, the daughter of Thomas, Lord Dacre. Thomas Harrington accompanied Henry VI for his French coronation in 1436, and would return to France six years later, also in the king's service, to fight in Gascony. When the king married Margaret of Anjou in 1445, Thomas Harrington was one of her escorts from France back to England. For his services, he was rewarded with many of the same royal offices his father had held in the duchy of Lancaster. He took part, under the earl of Northumberland, in the October 1449 border war with Scotland, which culminated in the Battle of Sark. It was at this battle that- stuck in 'mire ground'- both Harrington and the earl of Northumberland's son and heir, Lord Poynings, were captured by the Scots. Released the following year, in July 1450 Harrington led a force out of Lancashire to assist the king against Jack Cade's rebellion.

== Polarization of politics ==
Rosemary Horrox has suggested that it was probably activity in these duchy offices that 'helped to draw Thomas into the orbit of the Nevilles.' Certainly by 1446 he was deputy steward of Amounderness castle- the steward was York's ally, Richard, Earl of Salisbury, one of the greatest northern magnates of the time. Further, he stood with Salisbury's sons, Thomas and John Neville in their feud with sons of the earl of Northumberland in the Percy–Neville feud, and in November 1455, he acted as a nominee for the appointment of one of Salisbury's men as Sheriff in Yorkshire.

== Final years and the Wars of the Roses ==
In November 1458, Pollard says- quoting a contemporary chronicler- Harrington "was sente for to come to Myddleham to Erle of Sarisburie [to] take ful partie with ye ful noble prince the duke of Yorke." John Watts has described this kind of 'calculation' as intending to preserve his estate, 'regardless of how the impending crisis was solved.' A year later, in acknowledgment of the approaching strife, and the necessity to protect his estates, enfeoffed land to a group of Lancastrian gentry, among whom were the earl of Shrewsbury and Lord Clifford. He (along with his second son, James) fought with Salisbury at the Battle of Blore Heath, and although they won, both were captured afterwards and taken to Chester Castle. They were released after the Yorkists returned to power in July 1460 and Thomas's lands were restored to him. In early December 1460 he and his eldest son, John marched north with York and Salisbury, to suppress a Lancastrian insurrection. They fought at the Battle of Wakefield on 30 December 1460, and both were slain. His death, alongside that of his immediate heir, led directly to his children's feud with Lord Stanley during the early years of the next reign.
