= John Harrington (knight) =

Sir John Harrington (died 30 December 1460) of Hornby, Lancashire was a member of the English northern gentry. He was the eldest son of Sir Thomas Harrington, a retainer of the Yorkist earl of Salisbury. His father played an active role in the northern politics of the Wars of the Roses. On 30 December 1460 both Thomas and his father were in the army of Richard, Duke of York at the battle of Wakefield. The Yorkist army went down to a crushing defeat, and John Harrington was killed in battle alongside his father.

He had at some point married Maud Clifford, daughter of Thomas, Lord Clifford. He had a daughter, Elizabeth, c. 1456, who later married an illegitimate son of Sir William Stanley.
