= Jane Eaglen =

British opera singer (born 1960)

Jane Eaglen (born 4 April 1960) is an English dramatic soprano particularly known for her interpretations of the works of Richard Wagner and the title roles in Bellini's Norma and Puccini's Turandot. Her career at the Metropolitan Opera started with her Brunhilde in the Ring Cycle. Eaglen has performed at all major houses globally such as La Scala, the Metropolitan Opera House and many others. She currently resides in Boston, MA as a voice teacher at the New England Conservatory. She is the President and founder of the Boston Wagner Society. Eaglen spends her summers instructing at the Merola opera training program for emerging artists. Every year she judges several voice competitions, including the Laffont-Metropolitan Opera National Council Auditions.

== Background ==
Jane Eaglen was born 4 April 1960 in Lincoln, England. She attended South Park High School in Lincoln. She lived on Peel Street. A neighbour noticed Eaglen's musical interest, and she started piano lessons at the age of five, continuing until she was sixteen. Her piano teacher then suggested she take singing lessons, and for a year she studied with a local teacher.

After being turned down by the Guildhall School in London, Eaglen auditioned at age eighteen for Joseph Ward, the voice professor at the Royal Northern College of Music in Manchester. Ward took Eaglen on as a student and directed her toward roles such as Norma and Brünnhilde.

In 1984 she joined the English National Opera, and she spent a couple of years singing the First Lady in Mozart's Die Zauberflöte and Berta, the servant in Rossini's Il barbiere di Siviglia. Other roles included Leonora in Verdi's Il Trovatore. She was also cast as Santuzza in Mascagni's Cavalleria Rusticana.

Eaglen broke into the major opera scene when she was cast as Donna Anna in Mozart's Don Giovanni at the Scottish Opera. She went on to sing Brünnhilde and the title roles in Tosca and Norma with that company. She made her American debut as Norma in 1994 with Seattle Opera as a last-minute replacement for Carol Vaness, and followed, two weeks later with Brünnhilde at Opera Pacific, a last-minute replacement for Ealynn Voss. Her first Isolde came in 1998 with the Seattle Opera, a company she has returned to often. She repeated the role in 1999 at the Metropolitan Opera and in 2000 in Chicago.

== Career ==
Eaglen has performed the roles of Isolde (for the Metropolitan Opera, Seattle Opera, Gran Teatro del Liceu (Barcelona), Lyric Opera of Chicago, and in Puerto Rico), Leonore, and Brünnhilde (performed in Chicago, Seattle, San Francisco, Milan, New York and the UK). Other major performances include Bellini's Norma (performed for the Metropolitan Opera, Seattle Opera, Ravenna Festival with Maestro Muti, and the Bastille); Ariadne for Seattle Opera and in London; Senta (Der Fliegende Holländer) in concert with the San Francisco Symphony Orchestra; Ortrud (Lohengrin) and Helen (Amelia) for Seattle Opera; La Gioconda in Chicago and London; Donna Anna in New York, Vienna, Los Angeles, Munich and Bologna; and many others.

Her work on the concert platform includes performances of Strauss’ Four Last Songs with Daniel Barenboim with the Chicago Symphony Orchestra, and Gerard Schwarz with the Czech Philharmonic; Strauss' final scene of Salome with Zubin Mehta and the New York Philharmonic, and Richard Hickox and the London Symphony Orchestra; Wagners Immolation Scene with both Bernard Haitink and Jeffrey Tate and the Boston Symphony Orchestra, and Zubin Mehta and the NY Phil; Verdi's Requiem with Daniele Gatti and the Orchestra of St Cecilia, Rome; Mahler's Eighth Symphony with Klaus Tennstedt; Nabucco with Riccardo Muti for the Ravenna Festival; Gurrelieder with Claudio Abbado for the Salzburg and Edinburgh Festivals; Die Walküre and Siegfried with James Conlon in Cologne; and many others.

Eaglen's many solo albums include arias by Wagner and Bellini, arias by Strauss and Mozart, Strauss' Four Last Songs and other song cycles, and Italian Opera Arias. Her recording of Wagner's Tannhäuser with Daniel Barenboim for Teldec earned a Grammy for 'Best Complete Opera'. She may also be heard in Mahler's Eighth Symphony with Chailly for Decca; in Beethoven's Ninth Symphony with Abbado for Sony; as Tosca for Chandos; as Norma with Muti for EMI, and in the title role of Opera Rara's recently re-released Medea in Corinto. In addition, Eaglen is featured on Sony's soundtrack for the film adaptation of Jane Austen's Sense and Sensibility. Her 2007 season included Isolde in Tristan und Isolde in Spain; Lady Macbeth in Macbeth at Vancouver; Senta in Der Fliegende Holländer in the U.S.; Tosca in Japan; Ariadne auf Naxos in Hungary; and Brünnhilde in Die Walküre in Norway.

Eaglen was named an honorary Doctor of Musical Arts in 2005 by McGill University, Montreal. Formerly a member of the voice faculty at Baldwin-Wallace College and the artistic faculty of the Seattle Opera Young Artists Program, she teaches at New England Conservatory of Music.

In conjunction with her performance travel, Eaglen works with artist programs such as the Merola Opera Program and the Cardiff International Academy of Voice, and frequently teaches master classes. In July 2009, Eaglen received an honorary doctorate from Bishop Grosseteste University College Lincoln. She became a Doctor of the University College.

In 2010, Eaglen was named International Fellow in Voice at the Royal Scottish Academy of Music and Drama (RSAMD) in Glasgow. She is a Fellow of the Royal Northern College of Music.

== Audio and Video Recordings ==
=== Primary Recordings ===
- Jane Eaglen: Italian Opera Arias (2001)
- Jane Eaglen: Four Last Songs (2000)
- Jane Eaglen: Mozart & Strauss (1998)
- Jane Eaglen: Bellini & Wagner (1996)

=== Ensemble Recordings ===
- Wagner: Götterdämmerung (2006-Haitink)
- Mahler: Complete Symphonies (2005-Chailly)
- Beethoven: Symphony 9 (2004-Abbado)
- Pasatieri: Letter to Warsaw (2004-Schwarz)
- Puccini: Turandot (2002-Parry)
- Wagner: Der fliegende Holländer (2002-Barenboim)
- Wagner: Tannhäuser (2002-Barenboim)
- Verdi: Aida (2001-Parry)
- Bellini: Norma (1999-Muti)
- Bruckner: Messe No.3 and Te Deum (1997-Welser-Möst)
- Puccini: Tosca (1996-Parry)
- Schulhoff: Flammen (1996)
- Bellini: Norma (1995-Muti)
- Mayr: Medea in Corinto (1994-Parry)
- Wagner: Götterdämmerung (1991-Haitink)

=== Compiled Recordings ===
- Escape Through Opera (2001)
- Great Arias & Ensembles Vol 2 (2001)
- Sony Classical – Great Performances 1903–1998 (1999)
- Great Arias & Ensembles (1999)
- Opera Rara Collection (1998)
- Lost Empires Sdtk (1995)
- Sense and Sensibility Sdtk (1995)
- Jane Eaglen – Wagner (1995)

=== DVD Video ===
- James Levine's 25th Anniversary Metropolitan Opera Gala (1996), Deutsche Grammophon, B0004602-09
- Wagner: Tristan und Isolde; conducted by James Levine (1999)
- Last Night of the Proms 2000 (2002)

== Sources ==
- "Jane Eaglen". seattleopera.org. 12 February 2012. Archived from the original on 1 September 2014.
- "50th Anniversary". Seattle Opera. 1 September 2016.
