= Diana Green =

British economist and academic (born 1943)

Diana Margaret Green
- Born: 10 April 1943 (age 82)
- Education: Vice-Chancellor of Sheffield Hallam University (1998); Vice Chair of London Film School
- Occupations: academic, former vice-chancellor, economist
- Partner: John William Davy (2011)

Diana Margaret Green CBE (born 10 April 1943) is a British economist and academic, and a former vice-chancellor.

== Early life ==
She was born Diana Harris.

She attended South Park High School for Girls (a former girls' grammar school) in Lincoln, also known as South Park Girls' High School; Lincoln went comprehensive in 1974. She has said of her time at her grammar school Going to a grammar school was critical in terms of my career. I was encouraged to be ambitious.

Her father Charles taught at the City School in Lincoln, a boys' grammar school. She lived on Cross O'Cliff Hill.

She attended the University of Reading, gained a BSc in Economics from Queen Mary College, and a PhD in Economics in 1976.

== Career ==
In the 1970s she taught economics at the City of London Polytechnic (London Guildhall University from 1992 to 2002).

From 1984-87 she was Head of Department at Birmingham Polytechnic. She stayed at the University of Central England until 1998. She is on the Advisory Board of the Campaign for Science and Engineering. From 1998-99 she was the Chairman of the Society for Research into Higher Education (SRHE).

=== Vice Chancellor ===
She became Vice-Chancellor of Sheffield Hallam University in 1998.

She is also Vice Chair of London Film School.

== Personal life ==
She first married in 1967, divorcing in 1979. She married again in 2011 to John William Davy. She was appointed a CBE in 2007. She has a pilot's licence.

Academic offices
Preceded by	Vice Chancellor of Sheffield Hallam University; 1998- July 2007	Succeeded by Philip Jones
Preceded by	Assistant Director of Birmingham Polytechnic; 1987 - 1992	Succeeded by
