= South Park High School, Lincoln =

Secondary school in Lincoln, England

South Park High School, Lincoln, opened in 1922 and closed in 1989, was a secondary school in Lincoln, England.

== History ==
=== Grammar school ===
The school had originally opened in May 1922 as an all-girls grammar school (South Park High School for Girls) for the south of the city. It was opened by the City of Lincoln Education Authority. The first headteacher retired in July 1928, being replaced by Miss D Griffiths of East Grinstead.

Girls came from all over the Lincoln area, from RAF Scampton to Nettleham. By September 1932 the headteacher was Miss MA Hall. By January 1933 the headteacher was Miss Phyllis Higgs, who died in July 1971.

In 1937, new buildings and a swimming pool block were built by William Wright and Sons Ltd of Lincoln, costing £43,690 and £6584 for the pool. The new buildings were officially opened on Friday 14 October 1938 by Principal H. A. S. Wortley; James Stanhope, 7th Earl Stanhope was planned to open the new buildings.

During 1937 for three terms, there was an experiment where homework was done after school hours, and not at home. It was found that unsatisfactory work was often done. It was found that anxiety to get home for tea, and fatigue were caused. Rab Butler, the President of the Board of Education attended a meeting at the school on Wednesday 24 September 1941. In April 1944 English teacher Miss A Burtt was appointed the headmistress of Brigg Girls' High School, replacing Miss MG Liddle.

The headmistresses of the school, and Lincoln Girls High School both found difficulty in 1947 in getting enough qualified staff. A new headmistress was appointed in March 1955, 39 year old Miss Margaret Joan Widdowson, the deputy head of Queen Elizabeth’s Grammar School for Girls in Mansfield, where she attended school. Her father Mark Widdowson was a headteacher. She took up her position in September 1955, and would be headmistress for 25 years, and died in Lincoln County Hospital on 8 July 1997, aged 82. From 1933 to 1980, the school had two headteachers.

In November 1955, the speech night was attended by Henry Hurd Swinnerton, Professor of Geology at University College Nottingham. County hockey trials and matches took place at the school in the late 1950s. The kitchen was extended in the early 1960s to provide 450 meals a day. The Lincoln Music Festival was held at the school in the 1960s. Edith Clara Batho attended the speech night in November 1960.

Extensions were added in 1962 to allow for 560 girls. In April 1967 the school entered the second heat of BBC1's Science Fair '67 against Nottingham High School and the Gateway School in Leicester, with the project 'Are people lopsided'. The Vice-Chancellor of University of Nottingham, Frederick Dainton, Baron Dainton, attended the speech night in November 1967.

Another girls' grammar school in the city was Christ's Hospital Girls' High School, which became Lincoln Christ's Hospital School in 1974.

=== Comprehensive ===
It became co-educational in September 1974. There were extensions between 1974 and 1977. Miss Widdowson retired in July 1980.

By April 1988 the school had gone from a girls' grammar school with an excellent record in 1974, to a coeducational comprehensive facing closure. It was planned to close in September 1989.

The school was closed on Thursday 27 July 1989 due to falling numbers. South Park had been originally intended for 200 pupils, however, by the time it closed its size had reached 900.

=== City Technology College ===
The school was reopened as The Lincoln School of Science and Technology in September 1992

== Notable former pupils ==
=== South Park High School for Girls ===
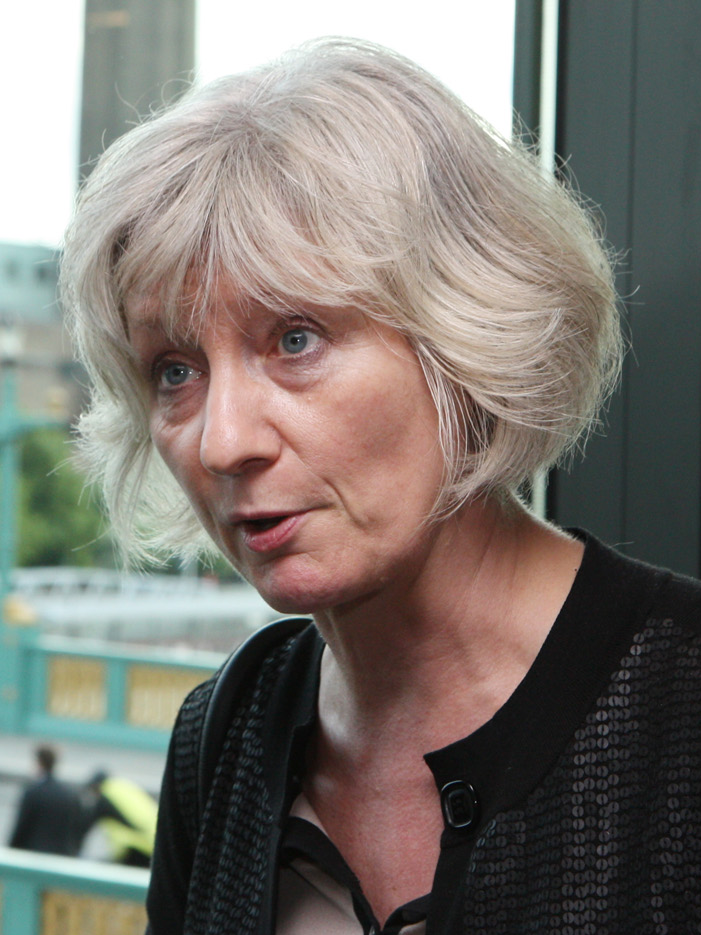
Shan Morgan in May 2011

- Prof Helen Atkinson CBE FIMechE FREng (nee Bavister), Professor of Materials Processing from 2002-17 at the University of Leicester
- Jane Eaglen, soprano
- Prof Diana Green CBE, Vice-Chancellor from 1998-2007 of Sheffield Hallam University (SHU)
- Dr Rosemary Horrox, historian, Fellow and former Director of Studies in History at Fitzwilliam College, Cambridge
- Karen Lee, Labour MP for Lincoln from 2017-2019, former NHS nurse
- Dame Shan Morgan, Ambassador to Argentina from 2008–12
