= Rosemary Horrox =

English historian

Rosemary Elizabeth Horrox, FRHistS (born 21 May 1951) is an English historian, specialising in the political culture of late medieval England, patronage and society.

She is a Fellow and retired Director of Studies in History at Fitzwilliam College at the University of Cambridge. She is an affiliated lecturer in history at Cambridge's Institute of Continuing Education.

She studied at South Park High School, Lincoln and received her Bachelor of Arts (BA), Master of Arts (MA) and Doctor of Philosophy (PhD) from the University of Cambridge, the latter being a study of royal patronage under King Richard III of England. She studied for this at Newnham College under the supervision of G.L. Harriss, whose suggestion it had been, and it was awarded in March 1977. More recently, her interests have expanded into the relationship between local- and central government, the Black Death, medieval female authority, and queenship. As well as lecturing full-time at Cambridge, she also lectures privately and for high schools, and campaigned against the dissolution of the AS Level in 2013.

During the 2012–15 controversy surrounding the burial place of the recently discovered bones of Richard III, she supported the claim of York to be the most fitting final resting place for the last Plantaganet king, saying that the dead king's "self-identification with the North is reflected in his plans for a chantry of 100 priests in York Minster, where he surely hoped to be buried."

She is a Fellow of the Royal Historical Society and General Editor of the Cambridgeshire Records Society. and is a general editor for The Parliament Rolls of Medieval England project, which transcribed, translated, and published digitally and in print, the Rolls of Parliament.

== Select bibliography ==
- Cambridge Social History of England, 1200–1500 editor with Mark Ormrod (Cambridge, 2006).
- Much Heaving and Shoving: Late-Medieval Gentry and their Concerns: Essays for Colin Richmond editor, with Margaret Aston (Chipping, 2005).
- ‘Service’ in Fifteenth Century Attitudes: Perceptions of Society in Late Medieval England, and editor, (Cambridge, 1994).
- ‘Personality and Politics’ in The Wars of the Roses: Problems In Focus, ed. A. J. Pollard (Basingstoke, 1995).
- Richard III: A Study of Service (Cambridge, 1989).
- The Black Death editor (Manchester University Press, 1994)
