= Richard Neville, 5th Earl of Salisbury =

English nobleman (c. 1400–1460)

Richard Neville Earl of Salisbury
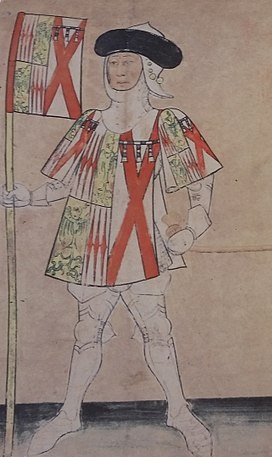
- Richard Neville, 5th Earl of Salisbury depicted in the Salisbury Roll, c. 1483
- Born: c. 1400; Raby Castle, Staindrop, County Durham, England
- Died: 31 December 1460 (aged 60); Pontefract, Yorkshire, England
- Cause of death: Beheaded
- Resting place: Bisham Priory, Berkshire, England
- Spouse: Alice Montagu, 5th Countess of Salisbury
- Children: Joan, Countess of Arundel; Cecily, Duchess of Warwick; Richard Neville, 16th Earl of Warwick; Sir Thomas Neville; Alice, Baroness FitzHugh; John, Marquess of Montagu; George, Archbishop of York; Eleanor, Baroness Stanley; Katherine, Baroness Hastings; Margaret, Countess of Oxford
- Parents: Ralph Neville, 1st Earl of Westmorland (father); Joan Beaufort (mother)
- Family: Neville

Richard Neville, jure uxoris 5th Earl of Salisbury (c. 1400 – 31 December 1460) was a fifteenth-century English northern magnate. He was the eldest son by the second wife of Ralph Neville, 1st Earl of Westmorland, from whom he inherited vast estates in Yorkshire, which he augmented by marriage to Alice Montagu, daughter and heiress of Thomas Montagu, Earl of Salisbury, from where he received his title. He was a loyal Lancastrian for most of his life, serving the King, Henry VI, in France, on the border with Scotland, and in many of the periodic crises of the reign. This included the fall of Humphrey, Duke of Gloucester, the fall of the Duke of Suffolk, Jack Cade's rebellion, and the revolt of the King's cousin Richard of York. He was also closely involved in an internecine feud with the senior branch of his family over the division of Ralph's estates from the late 1420s to the 1440s, and in the early 1450s his family and that of the powerful northern Percy family indulged in a violent local war, during which period Salisbury was a royal councillor.

Salisbury finally joined York in his last rebellion in the late 1450s and became a Yorkist leader during the early parts of the Wars of the Roses, joining the Duke in fighting at the First Battle of St Albans, where the King's force was defeated. In 1458, he participated in the Loveday, an attempt at reconciliation held in London. He was notably successful in the Battle of Blore Heath, but after the Yorkist army collapsed in the Rout of Ludford Bridge, Salisbury escaped to Calais, having been specifically excluded from a royal pardon. He returned to England with York in 1460, and took part in the disastrous Battle of Wakefield on 30 December that year. This resulted in a crushing Yorkist defeat at which his second-eldest son Thomas was slain on the field. Salisbury escaped the carnage but was captured the following day and executed in Pontefract Castle, where he was buried. Alice died around 1462, and two years later Salisbury was reinterred with her in the Montagu Mausoleum in Bisham Priory.

== Background ==
=== Family ===
Sir Richard Neville's father, Ralph Neville, Earl of Westmorland, inherited his father's Barony in 1388, and was summoned to Parliament from 6 December 1389 to 30 November 1396 by writs directed to Radulpho de Nevyll de Raby. In 1397 Neville supported Richard II's proceedings against Thomas of Woodstock and the Lords Appellant, and by way of reward was created Earl of Westmorland on 29 September of that year. However, his loyalty to the King was tested shortly thereafter. His first wife, Margaret Stafford, had died on 9 June 1396, and Neville's second marriage to Joan Beaufort before 29 November 1396 made him the son-in-law of King Richard's uncle, John of Gaunt, 1st Duke of Lancaster. Thus, when King Richard banished John of Gaunt's eldest son and heir, Henry Bolingbroke, on 16 September 1398, and confiscated Bolingbroke's estates after John of Gaunt's death on 3 February 1399, Westmorland was moved to support his brother-in-law. Bolingbroke landed with a small force at Ravenspur in July 1399. Westmorland and the Earl of Northumberland were in the deputation at the Tower which received King Richard's abdication, and Westmorland bore the small sceptre—the virge―at Bolingbroke's coronation as King Henry IV on 13 October 1399.

Richard Neville's mother, Joan Beaufort, was an illegitimate daughter of John of Gaunt, although she and her brothers were later legitimised. She was a great-aunt to King Henry VI, and so Neville and the King were cousins. Neville, argues Michael Hicks, was "very much a younger son" in the context of the Neville brood as a whole: his father had at least 21 children. Particularly in the North of England, comments Griffiths, royal blood was both socially and politically important, and "coursed through the veins of a number of lordly families" in the region.

Neville and his siblings, comments Hicks, made "excellent marriages ... the most remarkable sequence of the 15th century". Apart from Sir Richard, his brothers William, George, and Edward married heiresses of the Fauconberg, Beauchamp and Beauchamp of Bergavenny families. His brother Robert—destined for the church and so unable to marry—nevertheless received swift promotion to Bishop of Durham. Of Salisbury's sisters, Katherine married the Duke of Norfolk, Anne married the Earl of Stafford, and Eleanor Neville married both Lord Despenser and later the Earl of Northumberland. At one stage, notes the author George Goodwin, Salisbury "at one time or another had four dukes, one viscount, and four earls as brothers-in-law".

== Early life ==
One of the earliest known events in Neville's career was his circumnavigation of Richard, Lord Scrope's will in 1420, indicating a willingness to indulge in sharp practice—what E. F. Jacob called "legal and extra-legal action in the pursuit of territorial power"—from an early age, possibly with the approval of his father. Scrope had married Margaret, Neville's half-sister, and after his death his estates became the subject of a bitter feud between Neville and Scrope's executor, Marmaduke Lumley, a dispute that Sir Richard won. He was, suggests Professor Anne Curry, part of a second generation of English nobility in the mid-15th century—as distinguished from the previous generation, such as Bedford and Montagu—less defined by the war in France or the careers that went with it.

=== Marriage ===
Alice Montagu was the only surviving daughter of Thomas Montague, Earl of Salisbury, and his first wife Eleanor Holland, daughter of Thomas Holland, Earl of Kent. (Note: Thomas, Earl of Salisbury had died at the Siege of Orleans in 1429.) Their marriage had been contracted by 1421, as the ceremony took place on 12 February that year. Their marriage had been "facilitated" by Neville's mother, Joan Beaufort, who was a cousin of the King. (Note: As also had been the marriage of Richard of York to Neville's sister Cecilly.) Of all Westmorland's and Joan's children, Neville made the best marriage, and this completed his moulding as a high-ranking Lancastrian peer.

Neville's marriage to Alice Montagu was a stepping-stone, says the historian Mark Pushon, to a title "more in keeping with his future status as the leading territorial magnate in northern England". It also, with immediate effect—and similarly to his brothers' marriages or ecclesiastical appointments, augmented Neville influence in the north.

It was not without its difficulties. As the earldom was entailed in the male line, and Earl Thomas had a male heir—an elderly and childless uncle, Sir Richard Montagu—Neville's acquisition of the title had to be decided in council. This was an expensive procedure for Salisbury. The endowment descended to Sir Richard, and, although he died within a few months, it reverted to the crown rather than to Salisbury. It may be, posits Pollard, that lingering uncertainty surrounding Salisbury's right to the earldom encouraged Northumberland to launch his precedence suit.

== Career to 1452 ==
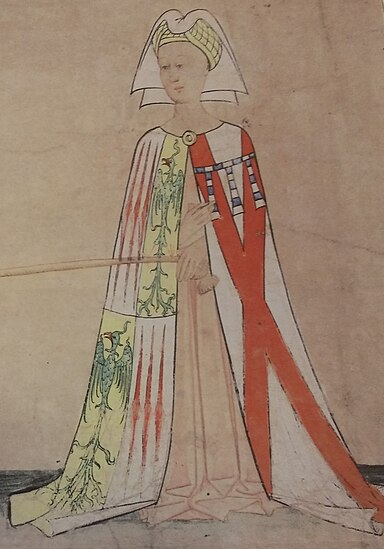
Alice Montagu, who brought Richard Neville the earldom of Salisbury on their marriage

By 1431, Salisbury was openly aligned with Cardinal Beaufort's faction on the council. In 1432, reflecting the political tensions between Gloucester and Cardinal Beaufort, Salisbury's parliamentary summons explicitly requested that he not attend with more than a minimal retinue for fear of inflaming the situation. Following the death of the Earl of Warwick, Robert, Bishop of Durham, moved swiftly to occupy Barnard Castle, which he argued was traditionally the fiefdom of the bishops of Durham. Salisbury, as an executor of Warwick's will and a feoffee with responsibility for the Beauchamp estate, moved equally swiftly to evict his brother. Salisbury petitioned the King against Robert's actions and was then appointed to the commission created to examine them.

In 1442 Salisbury beat off a claim for precedence from the Earl of Northumberland. Northumberland claimed that the 1421 Act of Restitution—which had codified Salisbury's title—enshrined the notion that no other would "touch [Northumberland's] pre-eminence". Salisbury refuted this, counter-claiming that Northumberland deliberately omitted the most important passage which explicitly enshrined his "pre-eminence as earl". The 1387 creation of the Montagu earldom was thus earlier than that of Percy, whose earldom had been recreated in 1414.

Alice travelled to France and accompanied Margaret of Anjou back to England for her wedding in 1444. (Note: They were accompanied by a number of English nobles, including the Duke of Suffolk and the Earl of Shrewsbury, who provided the embassy and their wives with "an appropriate entourage for a queen".) Two years later she was bequeathed a book, in French, the Gyron le Curtasse, from Richard of York's mother Maud, Countess of Cambridge. Alice and Salisbury were to be Maud's chief and secondary executor respectively. Salisbury was part of the deputation of August 1447, which arrested Humphrey, Duke of Gloucester, in Bury St Edmunds on a charge of treason; the case never came to trial, for within the week, Gloucester had died in prison.

=== The Beauchamp inheritance ===
In 1434, says A. J. Pollard, Salisbury sealed a "lucrative double-deal" with Richard Beauchamp, Earl of Warwick, by betrothing Salisbury's son Richard and daughter Cecily to Beauchamp's daughter Alice and his heir, Henry. The arrangements took some years to come to fruition and were intended to entwine the families. Although they cost Salisbury the-then massive sum of 5,000 marks—£3,233.66 (equivalent to £3,169,000 in 2025) (Note: This was the largest marriage portion of the century to be paid for a non-royal daughter.)—the marriages promoted the Neville family further. (Note: Hicks argues that the crown effectively paid £700 (equivalent to £686,000 in 2025) towards Salisbury's costs, as his children's espousals were part of his indenture to serve in France in 1436.) Salisbury intended that whichever marriage survived, either way, the extensive inheritance and titles would be the Nevilles's. (Note: Gerald Harriss has pointed out that such a strategy probably attempted to guard against the most common cause of failure in arranged marriages: child mortality.) The marriages took place two years later, when Alice was 15. Richard Beauchamp died in 1439, and Henry duly inherited the earldom; he had had a close relationship with the King, and this stood him in good stead when his title was elevated to Duke of Warwick in 1445. Henry and Cecily had a daughter, named Anne, the previous year, but Henry unexpectedly died on 11 June 1446. The baby Anne—now suo jure Countess of Warwick—says Hicks, was the "greatest heiress of her day.

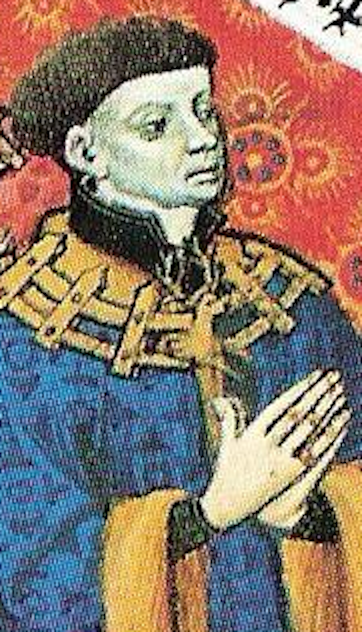
Salisbury's father, Ralph, Earl of Westmorland

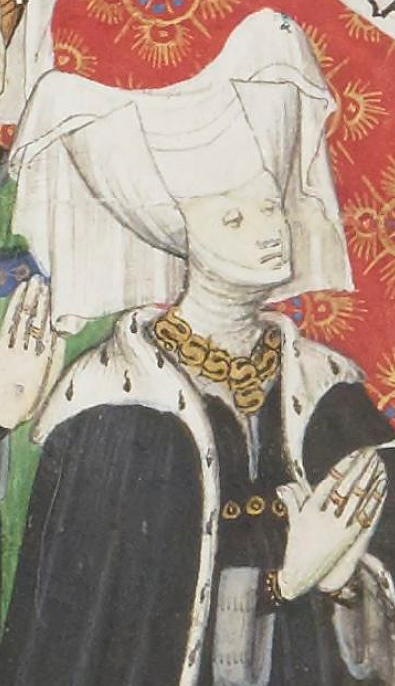
and his mother, Joan Beaufort

Salisbury, as an executor of Duke Henry's will, received custody of the Beauchamp estates. (Note: The other executors and custodians were William, Marquess of Suffolk, Ralph, Lord Sudeley and John, Lord Beauchamp. The latter, distantly related to the Beauchamp earls, took advantage of his position to launch his own claim to the earldom of Warwick, which, says the medievalist John Watts, while doomed to failure, meant that "Beauchamp was able to exact a handsome price for his acquiescence".) Salisbury was a strong supporter of the young countess and helped see off rival claims to her earldom. He also succeeded in having royal advisors to the estate dismissed, enabling him to administer it in its entirety from London, as "a going concern ... for the next heirs". For this purpose he took personal control of the Beauchamp family muniments: his letter to Beauchamp estate officials in Warwickshire instructs them to be gathered and sent to him under seal. Anne, however, died on 3 June 1449, and, there being no closer heirs than her aunt—Richard Neville's wife—Salisbury's son was summoned to parliament as Earl of Warwick jure uxoris. Warwick's claim, however, was not immediately secure: half-blood versus whole blood often complicated medieval inheritance disputes, as had occurred when Anne inherited in spite of having three half-sisters who lodged their own claims, as did Lord Beauchamp as the nearest—although distant—male heir. Although Warwick was summoned as Earl almost immediately, it was not until 1454 that his position was legally recognised and rival claims were dismissed; Christine Carpenter argues that there had been "uncertainty as to [the inheritance's] ultimate destination", and what was finally adjudged was "a rough and ready division that paid relatively little regard to absolute legal rights".

=== Warden of the West March ===
The Wardens of the West and East Marches, respectively—Lord Huntingdon and the Earl of Northumberland—both resigned from office in 1436. It is possible that there had been political interference or direction involved, says Professor Pollard, and "it is conceivable that the parties were caught up, in ways no longer discernible, in the political manoeuvrings of the Duke of Gloucester and Cardinal Beaufort". Salisbury took that of the West March over at a reduced rate. He received arrears of £1,000 (equivalent to £963,000 in 2025) from his wages as warden to help him fund his expedition to France in 1436. Even amidst the descent into factional politics, Salisbury was paid £1,578 (equivalent to £1,528,000 in 2025) for the office in June 1458. His power in the West March has been called "overmighty" by Pollard , and he undermined the local gentry to shore up his position. Although Peter Booth argues that this was a "short-sighted" policy, as it probably alienated potential retainers. Salisbury fared better than his Percy rival on the East March, who by 1455 was owed 2½ years' wages for his office, and, indeed, then received no payment at all for the following four years.

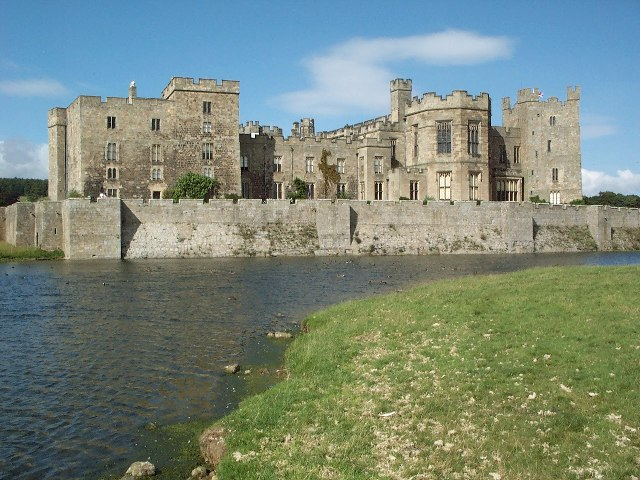
Raby Castle, Salisbury's birthplace in 1400, seen in 2009

=== France ===
Following his successful renegotiation of the truce with Scotland, Salisbury was able to undertake his first foreign service. This was in France in summer 1431, when he journeyed from Sandwich to Calais with a squad of 800 men, part of a 2,000-strong royal army already assembled to guard the King during his coronation expedition. (Note: The expedition cost £46,000 (equivalent to £43,949,700 in 2025). (Note: To put this amount into context, earlier in century, Ralph, Earl of Westmorland, had an annual income approximated between £2,500 (equivalent to £2,500,000 in 2025) and £3,000 (equivalent to £3,000,000 in 2025), while that of Henry Percy, Earl of Northumberland's has been assessed at £2,825 (equivalent to £2,900,000 in 2025).)) Salisbury was in Rouen during the trial of Jeanne d'Arc; Pollard suggests the 1431 sojourn was a convenient escape from the political machinations of Humphrey of Gloucester back in England. The royal army entered Paris in December 1431.

Foreign service was often a pretext for the crown to remove "principal troublemakers" from the theatre of discord; this may have been the reason for Salisbury's 1436 expedition, suggests Hicks. It was relatively rare for men from the north to perform service in France, as usually their military experience was gained—and used—against the Scots rather than the French. Both Salisbury and Fauconberg were approached for to undertake the service after parliament had discussed and approved of appointing them. They agreed on the condition that their mother did also and that she received royal protection from the Earl of Westmorland, with whom the Nevilles were feuding at the time. Commanded by the Duke of York, theirs was the largest army of the decade, comprising 5,000 men, of which Salisbury brought 1,300 men at arms and archers. he landed at Harfleur on 7 June. With York responsible for the overall campaign, Salisbury was his lieutenant-general with day-to-day responsibility for the war's prosecution and administration. With Suffolk, Salisbury may have acted in the capacity of a minder for the Duke as it was his first overseas command. Salisbury campaigned in the Pays de Calais and recovered Frécamp; with winter weather setting in, Talbot and Salisbury took Ivry in January 1437. York and Salisbury returned to England in autumn 1437, while Salisbury's brother Fauconberg remained in Normandy until 1444. Griffiths suggests that the campaign strengthened York and Salisbury's relationship. As a result of Salisbury's service, he was elected to the Order of the Garter.

Salisbury's second expedition was intended for 1443. However, the muster day came and went: Salisbury "turned up for three days, Somerset did not". The same thing occurred on at least one subsequent occasion that year as well. (Note: Harriss suggests that Somerset faced problems with recruiting and regularly renegotiated the size of his force.) Overall, Salisbury's service in France is considered by historians to have been relatively successful. Salisbury travelled to France following Suffolk's banishment in March 1450, and was partially responsible for the fleet which patrolled the channel in 1454 and relieved Calais.

=== Royal councillor ===
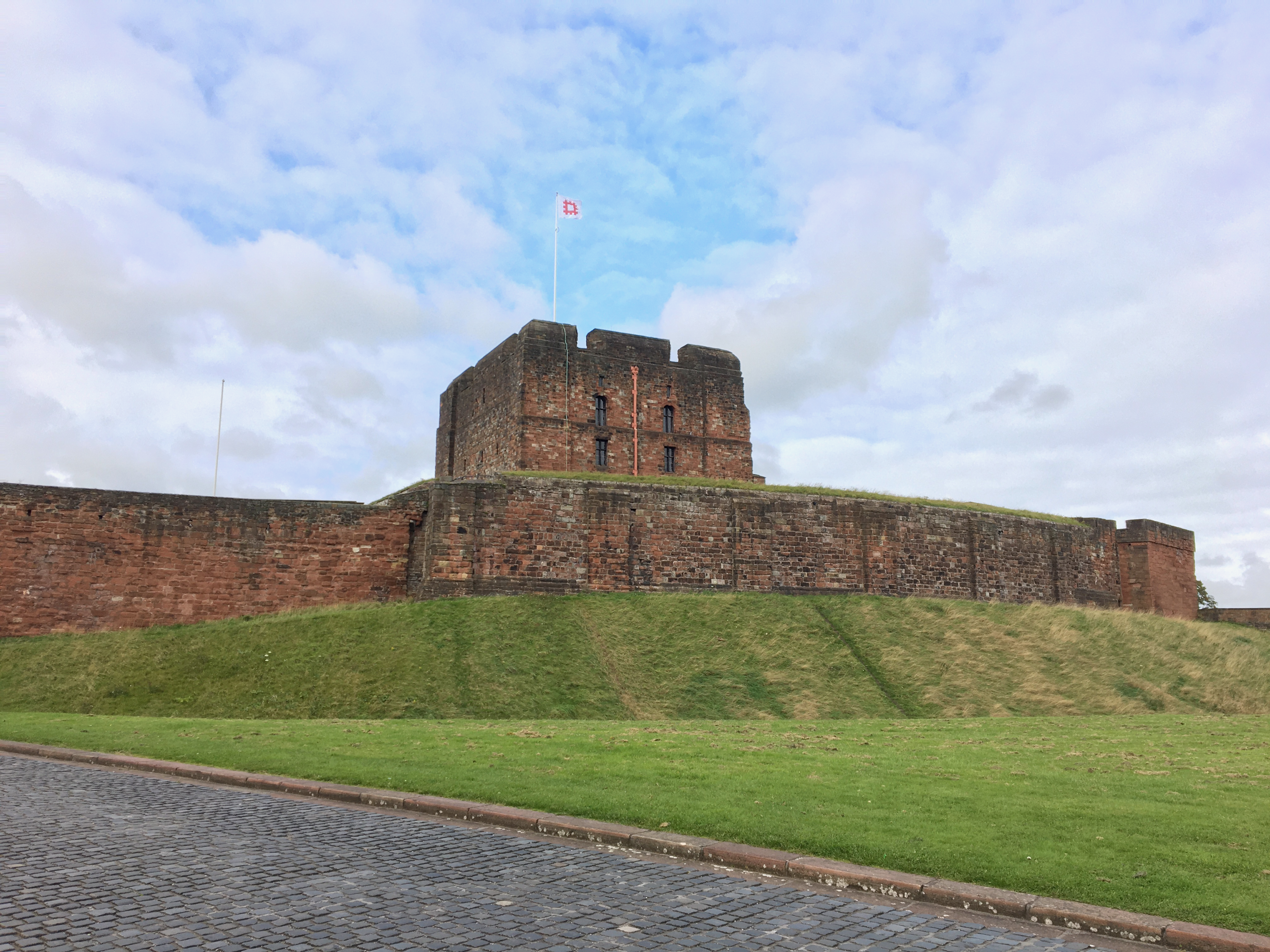
Carlisle Castle, Salisbury's headquarters as Warden of the West March seen in 2019

Contemporaries viewed the nobility as both warriors and counsel to the King and Salisbury's father had regularly performed both roles for the two previous Lancastrian Kings. However, Salisbury did not enjoy the close relationship as either kinsman or councillor with Henry VI as his father had done. Salisbury first attended council in 1428—probably as Cardinal Beaufort's nominee—and was one of a small number of nobles to officially join the council in 1437 on his return from France, receiving a salary of £100 (equivalent to £98,000 in 2025) a year for the office. Salisbury's appointment immediately placed him at the centre of government and part of an inner circle of political operatives under Beaufort that dominated government. As such, Salisbury was on the council during his feud with the Earl of Westmorland; this, says Harriss, was prudential, as that body "generally threw its weight behind the more powerful, especially its own members". Westmorland, suggests Storey, may have lacked faith in a council that was requesting that he submit his differences with Salisbury to arbitration when the latter was himself a councillor. Salisbury's position on the council, argues Pollard, "had undoubtedly been decisive in securing victory" over the senior Neville branch. Similarly, Salisbury's ability to manipulate the council probably left Westmorland lacking confidence in that body's impartiality.

Salisbury may have been deliberately excluded from the council for some years. He attended few councils after 1442, and only two out of 50 recorded sessions before the outbreak of the feud with the Percies in 1453. One such, of December 1446, heard Beauchamp of Powicke's final attempt to claim the Beauchamp inheritance. Salisbury and his colleagues vacated his claim in favour of the incumbent, Salisbury's son. In June 1450, when York, then Lord Lieutenant of Ireland, wrote to Salisbury as councillor to inform him that neither he nor his army in Ireland had been paid, and unless York was able to do so he would not be responsible for any losses to the Irish as a result. In 1453, suggests Hicks, he "reappeared" in council, but seems to have garnered very little advantage in the early months of the feud even though the council was verging on prosecuting John Neville, although he may have been able to weight the composition of the Oyer and Terminer commission of July 1453 in his family's favour. In the event, the council dropped proceedings against John during York's Protectorate. From 1453 he attended all of the known sessions, as did his allies, Cromwell and Fauconberg; his opponents, says Hicks, were notable by their absence. Salisbury recognised that events in distant parts of the kingdom could still be dealt with at Westminster, whereas the Earl of Northumberland may not have. For example, four days after the bloodless confrontation at Sand Hutton, Salisbury rode south in haste in order to attend, probably in order to enlist York's support there. Concomitantly, a month later, Salisbury gave his support to York against Somerset in council. York's backing gave Salisbury a substantial advantage over his family's enemies. It also made Salisbury one of a small number of active councillors who elected to give the council regnal powers during the King's illness, a move which gave the initiative to York suggests Griffiths. (Note: The council minutes of 5 December 1453, in discussing the King's "inffirmytey", describe how that body took responsibility for "pollytyque rule and gouernance of this land in all suche things as must of nessesseyte be entendyd unto".)

Griffiths suggests that "it was to be expected that the councillors who had served during the first Protectorate would be summoned again to provide broad support in the government of the realm". Salisbury did so, and regularly attended council after st Albans, for instance, at the 7 June 1456 session, Salisbury was one of the few nobles to attend; York was in the north attending to Scottish affairs and Warwick was in Calais. The nature of the meetings gradually changed. By 1457, they seem to have been addressing little and achieving less, and a year thence the Earl felt it necessary to attend in arms. Historically, Pollard says that Salisbury was "steeped in the collective conciliar approach" to government due to his early experience of it, which may account for his regular attendance in the later years of crises. he also understood the power having a voice within central government gave him in his affairs in the north of England.

== Neville family feud 1428–43 ==
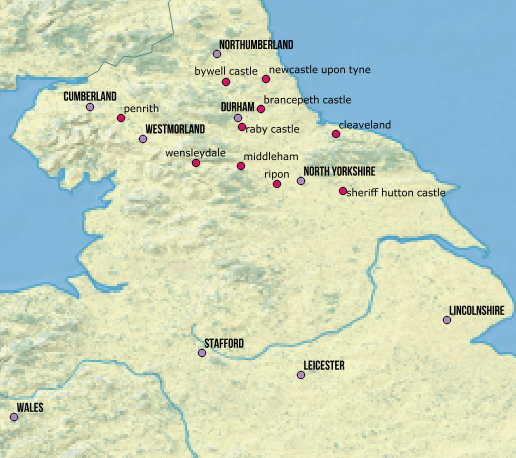
Ralph Neville's estates in Yorkshire, Cumberland, Northumberland, Westmorland and Durham in the early 15th century.

A. J. Pollard identifies the cause of the feud as Ralph's re-division of the Neville patrimony:

Ralph, Earl of Westmorland, was also responsible for ensuring that his family, by Joan Beaufort, took precedence over his eldest son and his siblings. From the time of his marriage to Joan Beaufort, and it may have been part of his marriage settlement, he began the process of partitioning his estates.

The Neville patrimony included lands in Yorkshire, Durham, Westmorland and Cumberland. After marrying Joan Beaufort, Ralph Neville began the process of disinheriting the children from his first marriage through a legal process called enfeoffment. The Earl's eldest son John Neville, had previously agreed to a settlement in which he would inherit only Raby Castle and Brancepeth Castle in Durham. This transfer of property to the cadet branch resulted in the "virtual disinheritance" of the senior branch of the family. It was done legally, leaving the senior Nevilles with no legal recourse. Charles Ross has noted that the Earl's eldest son does not seem to have attempted to stop his father or prevent his son's disinheritance, and may even have assisted with some of the transfers. The transfer process—known as the Neville trust or Neville–Beaufort trust—was devised by William Gascoigne, one of the crown's most prominent lawyers. This might reflect an interest of the crown in retaining the Neville lands with Beaufort descendants, who would be closely related to the royal family due to their shared Lancastrian ancestry.

When Ralph Neville died in 1425, the title earl of Westmorland passed to his eldest grandson Ralph "in tail male", but neither of his sons by Margaret Stafford was mentioned in his will. Joan immediately took possession of Middleham Castle, Penrith Castle and Sheriff Hutton Castle for her eldest son. She also held Raby Castle in Durham as part of her dower until her death in 1440. Historian J. R. Lander has written that the second earl of Westmorland was as "poor in land as an Earl as his father had been in early life as a baron". Only some estates in Brancepeth, Northumberland, Lincolnshire, two inns in London and Newcastle upon Tyne, Bywell Castle and property in Ripon were left for the senior Neville inheritance. The vast Yorkshire properties of Middleham Castle, Sheriff Hutton Castle and Wensleydale all went to Richard Neville, who also became Warden of the West March when he inherited the Honour of Penrith in Cumberland. This was, effectively, a legal fraud.

== Estates and a northern hegemony ==
The bulk of Salisbury's estates lay in the North Riding of Yorkshire. (Note: Yorkshire's three Ridings, were effectively divided between four powers: the crown (as Duke of Lancaster), the Percies, the Duke of York and Salisbury. However, both the King and York were basically absentee landlords, so any local tensions, argues Griffiths, would have to be absorbed by Percy and Neville.) However, Alice brought him the substantial Montagu inheritance, predominantly based in Southern England, worth around £1,240 (equivalent to £1,312,000 in 2025) per annum. These did not include the Montagu lands entailed in the male line, which had escheated to the crown in 1429 and sold to Cardinal Beaufort. His power in the North Riding underpinned his influence elsewhere, such as the East Riding, and his collation of local political office to himself and his family consequently reduced those available to others. He was never able to convert his grant of the Honour of Richmond into one of tail male, which, geographically, was adjacent to his Middleham estate. Salisbury built his hegemony not just through his landed possessions, but also successfully exploited his close connections at court which his mother's Beaufort blood brought him; furthermore, in 1451, Salisbury's brother George, Lord Latimer, was declared a lunatic and the Earl was granted wardship of Latimer's estates.

In the North West, Salisbury was effectively in sole control, as the traditional lords of Cumbria—the Clifford family—were encumbered by minorities until the 1450s, thus giving the Earl a free hand in the region. Likewise, his brother Robert, now Bishop of Durham, says Storey, "was persuaded to consider his extensive temporalities as a suitable source for the further enrichment of his brothers", among whom Salisbury profited the most. Robert made him an annuity of £100 (equivalent to £103,000 in 2025) and sat regularly on the episcopal bench. Salisbury had unrivalled supremacy in the northeast following St Albans, as the new Earl of Northumberland was also a minor until 1457 and so could not claim his estates.

== Affinity ==
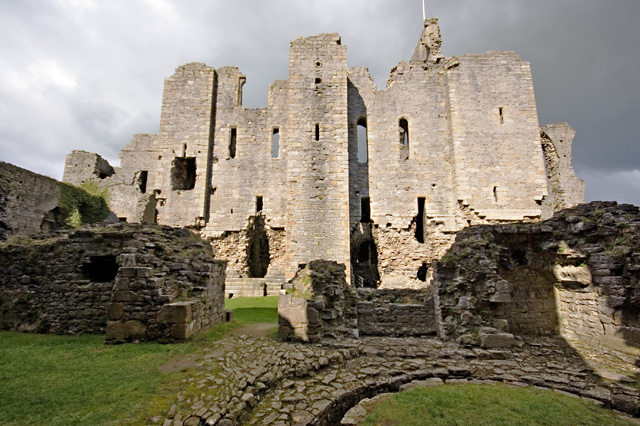
Middleham Castle, Salisbury's northern caput, seen in 2014

A nobleman's retinue rode everywhere with him, including, for example, when their lord attended parliament. Thomas Harrington and James Pickering were associated with Salisbury from at least 1455, when they were elected to the 1455 parliament as his candidates. Pollard has highlighted how, with one or two exceptions such as Sir John Conyers, most of Salisbury's affinity was his own age or older, and represented a tight-knit group of individuals. Salisbury was able to rely on these men to support him when he eventually challenged the King in the late 1450s, and indeed, trusted them to the extent that asked their advice before taking "the full part of York" in 1459. This was in spite of the fact that, on a more national scale, James Ross argues, "on the level below the foremost participants (in feuds) there was a general reluctance to get drawn into the conflict". Such men were close enough to perform personal as well as political service; Sir James Strangeways, who indentured with Salisbury in 1446, was the Earl's executor 14 years later. Retained men could also be put to wholly partisan use in local politics. In 1454 he stuffed a local peace commission with his men in order to raise a force against Henry, Duke of Exeter.

In building his affinity, Salisbury "infiltrated" Percy holdings, both south of Middleham and "deep into Percy country" in southern Northumberland. Many of these fees were charged to the honour of Middleham, which was clearly the centre of his regional empire, although after the Battle of St Albans he began recruiting heavily in the Honour of Knaresborough. (Note: This was at the expense of the Percy family, as the steward of the Honour was their man, William Plumpton; on one occasion, Salisbury's retainers broke up a meeting where Plumpton was attempting to announce a Royal proclamation.) From 1457 he recruited in Wensleydale., probably in response to the attempted assassination of Warwick at Westminster that November.

Salisbury could call upon a large number of men to support him. For example, travelling to the parliament of 1454, he was expected to bring a "goodly fellowship" while he attended the 1458 Royal Council with around 400 horsemen and 80 knights and squires. In comparison, York himself attended with only 140 knights and horsemen. Pollard notes that Salisbury's affinity was strong enough that it survived his attainder in 1459 to the extent that its members were disturbing the peace in Yorkshire the following summer.

== Regional relations ==
Salisbury was involved in a precedence dispute with the Earl of Northumberland, who claimed that "the name and dignity of earl could not descend to a woman since women could not bear the title of earl, and that the earldom could not descend to RN by right of his wife". Hicks argues otherwise, noting that the earldom was not entailed in the male line, so daughters could not only inherit but also convey the title to their husbands.

Alice received a number of bequests from the local northern gentry, including from Thomas Witham of Cornburgh, Salisbury's retainer—who left money for prayers to be said for her—and another, Robert Constable, left her a large diamond ring in 1454. Salisbury enjoyed good relations with John Wessington, prior of Durham cathedral priory, and invited the prior to attend the christening of George Neville at Middleham Castle in 1432. He also maintained good relations with Thomas Langley, Bishop of Durham.

=== Outbreak of feuding with the Percy family ===
Relations between the Neville and Percy families had been tense for many years. The first Earl of Northumberland's disgrace and attainder in 1405 had allowed the subsequent dominance of the newly-ennobled Earl of Westmorland who effectively took Northumberland's position as the premier authority of the region. (Note: Griffiths argues that "although rather earlier than the Nevilles in the field of advancement, the Percies forfeited their lead—and their estates—after deserting Henry VI in 1403; whereas Earl Ralph Neville of Westmorland enlarged his holdings and influence by foresight and fecundity before his death in 1425". Salisbury, says Griffiths, faced no such impediments.) However, with the restoration of the second Earl in 1416, relations appear to have improved, and the two Earls cooperated regularly if not closely. Indeed, Westmorland's influence was at least partially responsible for his rival's restoration. In 1449, Northumberland's second son, Thomas Percy, was created Baron Egremont, which dealt a loss to Salisbury, who had held a portion of the Honor of Egremont until that point.

Griffiths has argued that, by the middle of the century, relations between the two families "were poisoned by jealousy and resentment". However, there is no record of violence between the families until 1453. Salisbury's youngest sons, Thomas and John, "spearheaded the Neville retaliation" against the Percy family, and acted as their father's representatives in the field.

The proposed marriage of Thomas to Maud in May 1453 appears to have been the immediate cause of the dispute; Griffiths has described the match as "obnoxious" to the Percies, as not only symbolising continued Neville aggrandisement but giving Salisbury's son a direct connection to the ex-Percy manors of Wressle and Burwell, (Note: Both of which had been forfeited by the first Earl of Northumberland in 1405 and two-thirds of which were later granted to Cromwell for life in February 1438 along with the reversion of the remainder; the grant had been converted to one of fee simple in 1440. This made the manors inheritable by Cromwell's heirs. Burwell was one of Cromwell's most valuable manors, with an income of £38 10s 6d per annum.) which Egremont may have hoped to reclaim on Cromwell's death. The wedding took place in August 1453 and was effectively paid for by the large loans Cromwell made to Salisbury that Summer, argues Griffiths. Egremont attempted to ambush Salisbury and his family as they returned from Tattershall with Thomas's new bride; according to Griffiths, "the aim was the destruction of the entire Neville company". Although contemporary records only name Salisbury and four other members of the party, they would all have brought large retinues with them, so the numbers involved could have been large. Salisbury may have been personally targeted for attack by Sir William Buckton, due to the fact that at the later indictments, his name was individually recorded as being contra comite Sarum in campo ('against the earl of Salisbury in the field'). From this point, Egremont launched a series of "largely unprovoked attacks upon the servants and 'well-wishers'" of Salisbury's.

On 8 October 1453, the government wrote to Salisbury and Northumberland—"more in sorrow than in anger", suggests Griffiths—reminding them of their positions as Commissioners of the Peace and King's councillors. Although the letters demanded they use only peaceful means for dispute resolution, "yet, the letters concluded wearily", both Earls were raising armies. Their sons were also written to—in stronger terms—warning them they could eventually suffer forfeitures. The council were in a difficult position to follow through with their threats, however, because the King by now was incapacitated and every nobleman was needed to assist in the running of the country peaceably. This could not prevent continued outbreaks of violence; on 20 October, Salisbury and his sons confronted the Percies at Topcliffe. The result of the confrontation is unknown, but this was the first assembly of the two families' armies since Heworth. With the King now incapacitated, Salisbury may have taken advantage of this to settle local scores. By the time parliament met in March 1454, peace had still not been established in the north. Indeed, if anything, Salisbury may have been perceived as winning, leading to hitherto unlikely allies emerging. Griffiths notes that, although Salisbury had not until this point received any assistance from his cousin Westmorland—and never would—Westmorland's brother, Sir Thomas Neville of Brancepeth, "seems to have indulged an unusual display of cousinly affection towards Salisbury" by organising a cadre to smash up a Percy retainer's house near Scarborough, where they pulled the wall down and stole much of value.

== Factional politics and war ==
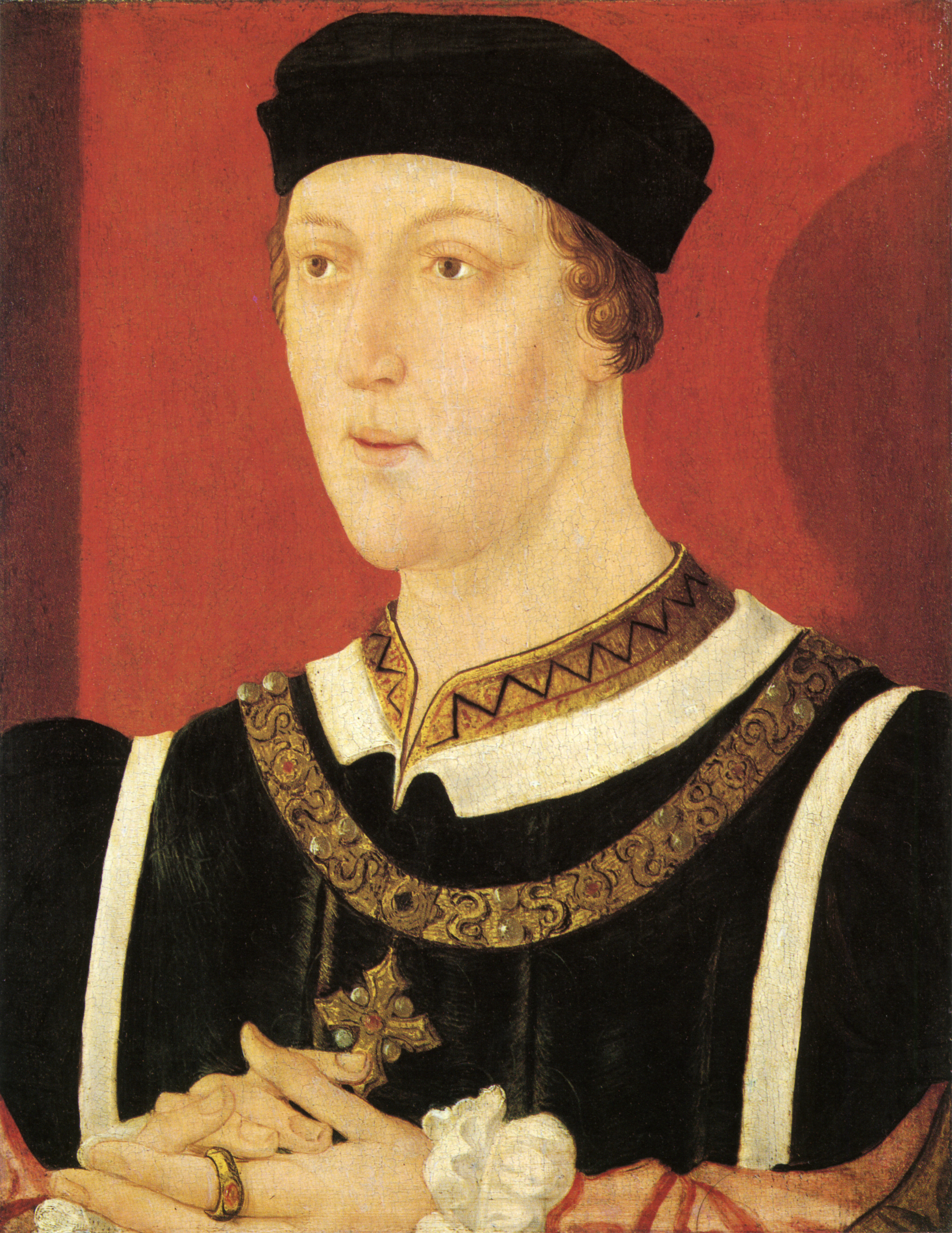
King Henry VI, whose grandfather had deposed Richard II

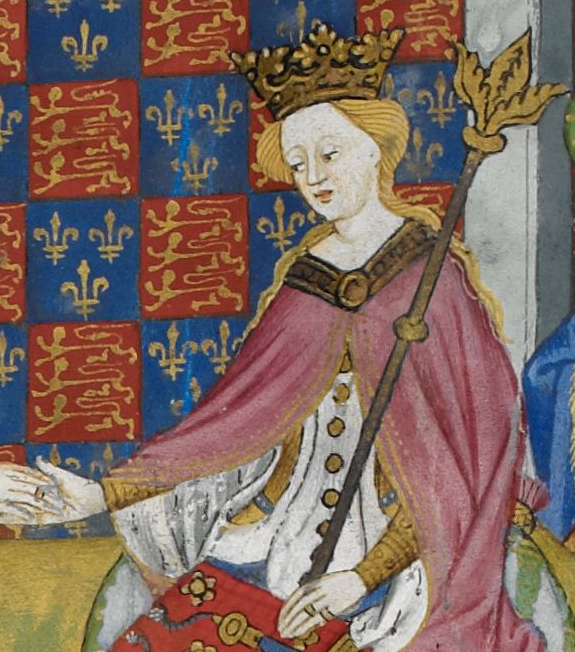
His wife, Margaret of Anjou, the eventual figurehead of her husband's government

Prince Edward of Westmister was created Prince of Wales on 15 March 1454. Salisbury attended the Prince's investiture; York was in the north dealing with the Percies. Little over a week later, on the 22nd, Cardinal Kemp—in what proved to be a "fortuitous" moment for York and his allies—died. The chancellor was the most vital office of state, being the keeper of the Great Seal, without the stamp of which no government action could be carried out. Kemp had remained loyal to the King throughout the recent factionalism, and his death removed an obstacle for the Duke. Kemp's had been an advocate of moderation, and his death "brought matters to a head", argues Loades.

=== Chancellor ===
On Kemp's death, a new Chancellor was required. This was usually the prerogative of the monarch, but the King was still ill; the council sent a deputation to Windsor but received no sign of acknowledgement from Henry. Thus the council took the unusual step of choosing Kempe's successor and appointed Salisbury on 27 March 1454. Modern historians view the appointment as a clear break with tradition. For example, Carpenter describes his appointment as "highly unusual"; while Hicks questions whether Salisbury was the genuinely most suitable candidate available; and Johnson comments that "his selection in such sensitive political circumstances was little short of sensational". Traditionally, the post had been exclusively the role of an ecclesiast. (Note: The last lay appointment to the office had been that of Sir Thomas Beaufort between 1410 and 1411. Salisbury was to receive an annual salary of £200 (equivalent to £209,000 in 2025) for the office.) His appointment also reflected the importance of Salisbury's support for York to the Duke—to the point of dependence—and Salisbury, at the height of the feud with the Percies, was a willing partner. The historian Helen Castor argues that Salisbury was convinced that Somerset's control of the government and the King gave his family "no chance of securing justice in their vicious feud" with the Percies. His appointment cemented the Neville-York alliance. Hicks notes, however, that Salisbury possessed the experience for the office, having served for 30 years as a councillor, Justice of the Peace, and Warden of the West March. Both a number of experienced bishops, as well as those politically neutral lords already on the council, must have agreed with the appointment.

One of Salisbury's first acts while attending the April 1454 session of parliament in his official capacity was to hear a petition against Egremont and Sir Richard Percy. In response, the council summoned the two men, as Hicks puts it, "to attend on the Chancellor: their opponent Salisbury". (Note: This act, which also strengthened the penalties for non-appearance, is the first example of a Chancery document written in English, probably deliberately in order that it would be universally understood. Salisbury's role, suggests Hicks, was to coerce the council into acting, even in the face of excuses. Salisbury persuaded lords sympathetic to the King to join the council, which Griffiths suggests ensured that that body had a semblance of non-partisanship. (Note: Conciliar absenteeism was rife. In 1984, Griffiths published a minute from the Protectorate council which allows the historian to be something of a fly on the wall. The discussion "not only provides a rare glimpse of what took place behind the closed doors of the council chamber, but enables the historian to overhear one of the most revealing discussions of the reign". This was the day after his appointment; he had discovered, says Griffiths, "an unmistakeable reluctance on practically all sides, lay and clerical, to serve on the new council ... with members pleading incapacity by illness—so much so, that the naïve might be pardoned for concluding that a serious epidemic was raging". This included Warwick himself, who claimed that his "youth and inexperience" precluded his taking his seat.) .) The petition was lodged by Salisbury's own retainer Thomas de la More, who claimed that Egremont had threatened to cut off his head in Westmorland. Although de la More's petition was nominally addressed to the King, it is likely that this was in effect a fiction, and that he was seeking Salisbury's good lordship.

Salisbury took advantage of his new position to renegotiate—at an improved rate—his contract as Warden of the West March. He also persuaded the council to agree to the preferment of his son George to the next bishopric to become available, and furthered his other sons' campaign against the Percies. The council sent letters to Egremont soon after parliament opened, demanding he appear before them on 3 March. These were "much stronger in tone than those sent out earlier: Northumberland and his sons were ordered to appear before council by 12 June. (Note: Egremont managed to avoid receiving them by steering clear of such of his residences to which the council may have written.) The council also condemned Exeter and his attempts to capture York, which Griffiths links directly to Salisbury's direction. In May 1454 the homes of his retainers in York were attacked, and in summer Salisbury left London for his northern estates. Based in York, he toured his castles of Middleham, Sheriff Hutton and Barnard, through August and September. He also visited Pontefract Castle, where Exeter was imprisoned. Salisbury was accompanied by a number of Chancery clerks and remained in possession of the Great Seal. This enabled him to personally authorise the arrest of a number of individuals suspected of rioting on Egremont's behalf. Salisbury delayed his return to London due to an outbreak of plague in August, but was back in Westminster by October for a Great Council, where reform of the royal household was discussed. Another meeting in December probably had the King's health as its main topic, for he recovered soon after Christmas. Salisbury had been present at his Stamford Bridge manor on 31 October 1454 when he and his sons and their retinues confronted a large Percy force. This was a decisive encounter and saw the capture of Egremont and Sir Richard Percy, at which point the feud between the two families effectively ended in a Neville victory. The two Percy brothers were subsequently—and "systematically", says Hicks—indicted in York by Warwick and the Duke, while Salisbury dealt with government business in Westminster. Following their capture, Egremont and Richard Percy were bound over to pay Alice £5,000 (equivalent to £4,841,000 in 2025).

Salisbury was replaced as chancellor by the Archbishop of Canterbury, Thomas Bourchier on 7 March. Salisbury had outlasted York's protectorate by over a month, although it is unknown whether he left the post willingly. Hicks suggests he did so, in late January; Storey suggests that he resigned, but that his resignation had been orchestrated by his factional opponents. He may well have resigned in protest at the release of Exeter from Pontefract and of Somerset from the Tower. In any case, his position became "untenable", says Gillingham, after York's dismissal from the Protectorate: Salisbury "could never hope to remain chancellor once York's dominance was ended, and Somerset's release in February signalled just that".

=== St Albans, 1455 ===
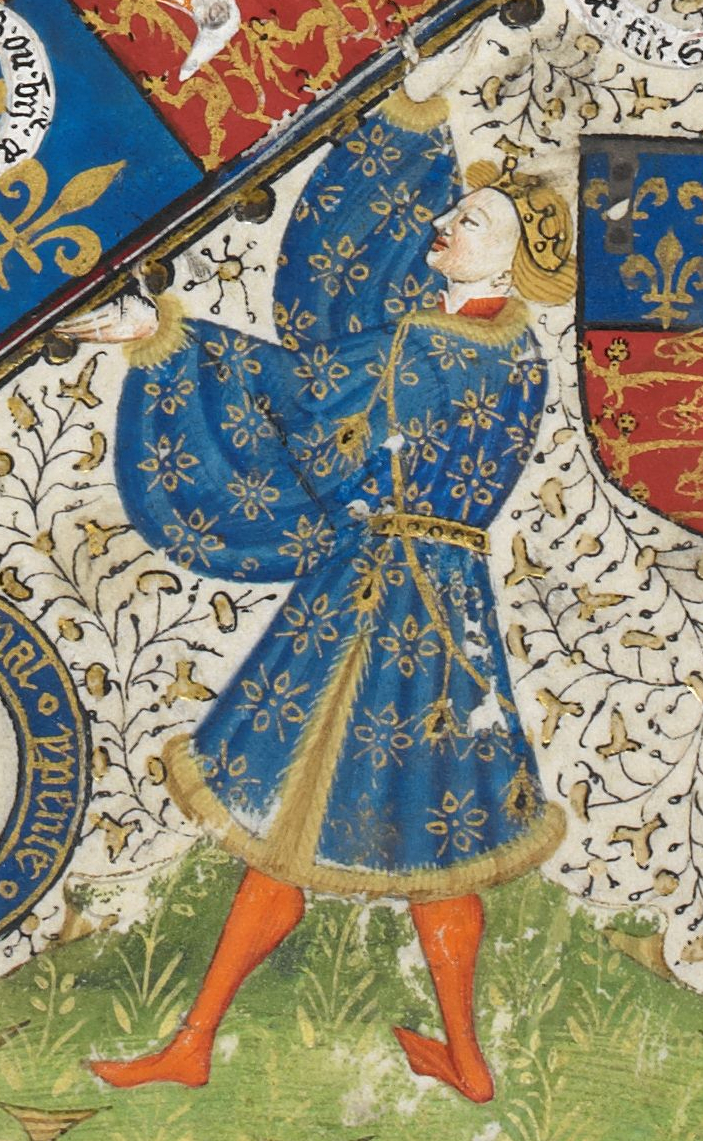
Richard of York, a descendant of Edward III and claimant to the English crown

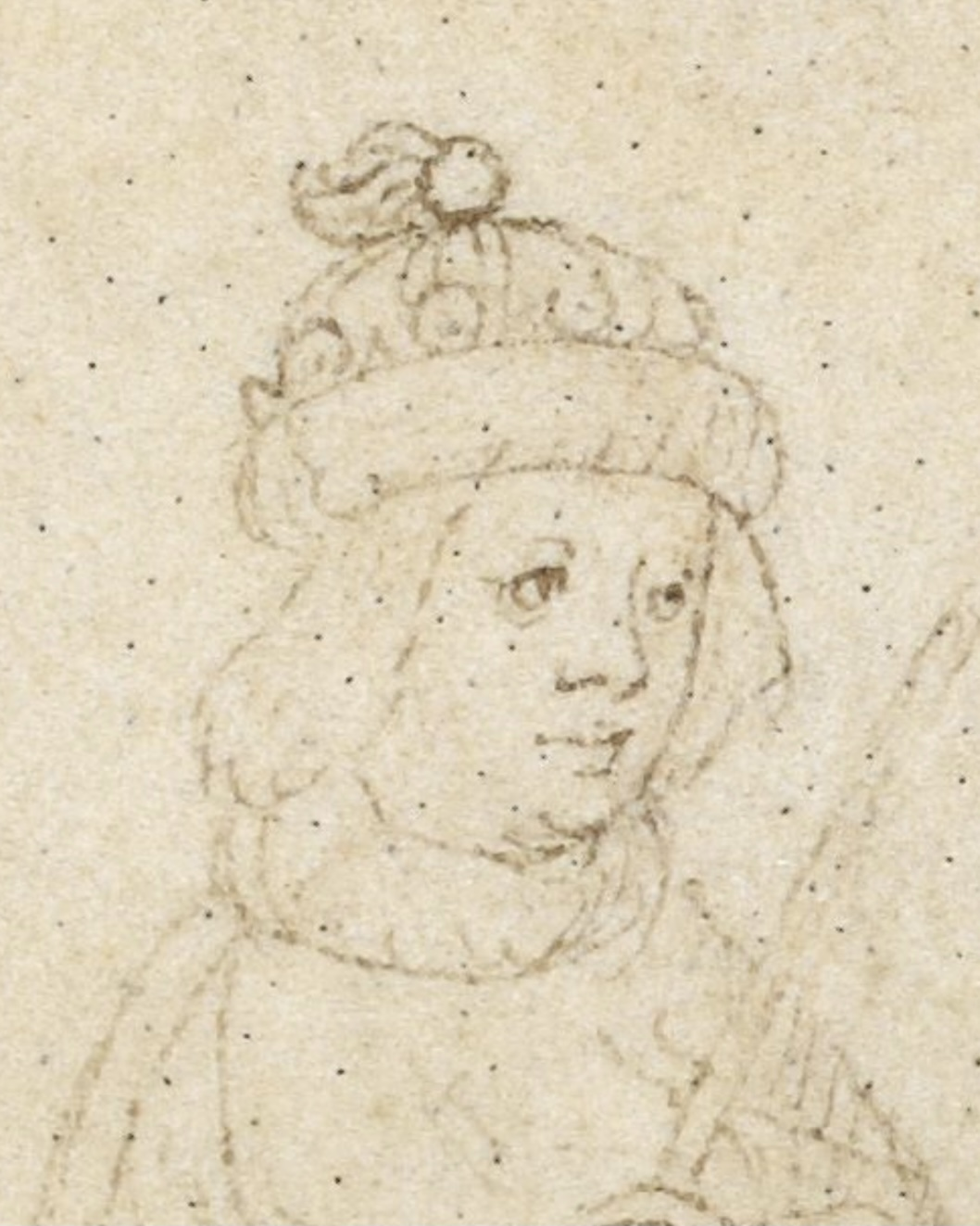
Henry's and Margaret's son Edward of Westminster, who was disinherited in favour of York in 1460

Following St Albans, Henry had accepted Salisbury, Warwick and York into his service again as true liegemen, although Hicks notes that the King was effectively their prisoner and "had no choice". They escorted him to London, where they arrived on the evening of 23 May 1455, with Salisbury on one side, York on the other, and Warwick holding his sword up at the front. The following month the royal family were moved to Hertford Castle; Salisbury based himself in close proximity at Rye House It maybe around this time that Queen Margaret is known to have hunted in Salisbury's Ware Park. When parliament assembled at Westminster Palace in July that year, Salisbury is known to have attended armed and wearing his armour, travelling too and from the palace in Thames barges loaded with weapons; "perhaps", muses hicks, "they feared an ambush". York's reliance on the Nevilles throughout this period is "striking", comments Johnson, and Hicks notes that Salisbury, Warwick and Fauconberg were the only nobles to consistently attend the sessions of the Lords.

Parliament did not sit over Christmas, but when it sat again in February 1456 the atmosphere was still tense; Warwick and York attended, a chronicler says, with 400 armed men. Salisbury, says Pollard, chose not to "to put his head above the parapet", and Johnson suggests that the King was still making strenuous efforts to keep the Earl loyal. Up until St Albans, Salisbury was probably the most important of York's allies. York had, after all, abandoned his erstwhile ally Thomas Courtenay, Earl of Devon in favour of Courtenay's enemy, William, Lord Bonville, after Bonville allied himself with Salisbury. From 1455, however, Warwick had become York's pre-eminent ally, which may account for "a new ruthlessness and single-mindedness in the Yorkist camp" thereafter. (Note: Pollard argues that Warwick had broken his father's "recent alliance" with Ralph, Lord Cromwell by condemning the latter publicly in parliament.) Although the second Protectorate had come to an end, Salisbury and York remained in charge of the parliamentary session. Salisbury was still in London from May to June 1456, when he helped put down riots in the city of London (Note: 1456 was a violent year in London, and in November—probably assisted by the general disorder—Lord Egremont and his brother had escaped from Newgate while a rooftop protest was ongoing.) and attended a Great Council respectively, but may have felt "increasingly marginalised", says Pollard. For example, although central to Salisbury's northern hegemony, the constableship of Richamond Castle had recently been granted to Humphrey Neville of Brancepeth; this, suggests Storey, could very well have re-opened "an old wound". (Note: The medievalist James Petre suggests that this was Queen Margaret's idea, as she was "determined to buy the [Neville’s of Brancepeth] family's support and to encourage them to renew the challenge to Salisbury's hegemony in the north".)

David Loades argues that at this point the King still favoured Salisbury, and that when the Earl left for the north it was with the royal blessing and instructions to coordinate defences against the Scots in his capacity as Chief Steward of the north parts. (Note: The crown, argues Storey, was effectively "a stranger in the north" in this period.) Pollard, however, describes Salisbury as withdrawing to his northern estates. Either way, he took the opportunity to consolidate and expand his affinity, recruiting heavily in Knaresborough and alienating the local lord, Sir William Plumpton, in the process. Salisbury's brother Robert died in July 1457, and it is likely that the Queen engineered the granting of the episcopacy to her own household Chancellor. This was a blow to Salisbury's influence in the Palatinate of Durham and, although Booth remained conciliatory towards him, he cancelled the large annuities that Robert had been paying the Earl and Fauconberg. Another Great council was called for November 1457. Salisbury attended, but on this occasion, he was met at Doncaster by John, Viscount Beaumont and escorted south. Beaumont had been instructed to meet Salisbury under Privy seal, but whether for Salisbury's own protection or under duress is unknown. This council seems to have achieved little, and was prorogued until May the following year.

=== Loveday ===
The French had raided Sandwich in 1457, and King Henry needed a united nobility. Pursuant to this, he wished to bring the Nevilles back into the fold. On 23 March all parties concerned in the King's award sealed bonds under oath, promising to abide by it; Salisbury—also on behalf of Thomas and John—was bound to pay £8,000 (equivalent to £7,841,000 in 2025) to the Duchess of Somerset and both Somerset and Northumberland's heirs. (Note: These were deliberately enormous sums, suggests Hicks, as those who broke their pledge would be "ruined".) On 25 March 1458 the King summoned his nobility to attend a Loveday (also known as the Annunciation Loveday) at St Paul's Cathedral. It was intended as a ritualistic reconciliation and the culmination of weeks of negotiations initiated by King Henry in an attempt to resolve his nobility's factional rivalries. There was, however, little appetite for reconciliation among the sons of the nobility killed at St Albans.

Pollard suggests that "it was only with great reluctance that [Salisbury] agreed finally to return to court and the council chamber", as well as to take part in the King's Loveday. Salisbury lodged in his London residence, the Erber, attended the ceremony with a force of 400 men, including 80 knights and esquires; this was over twice the force that York brought. He held the hand of the new Duke of Somerset, who was 36 years his junior, on the procession to St Paul's. Salisbury and Somerset marched in front of the King, while the Queen, hand in hand with York, marched behind. As part of the King's arbitration, Salisbury promised to forgo the fines levied on Egremont and Richard Percy and agreed to endow St Albans Abbey in memory of the slain within two years, paying £45 (equivalent to £44,000 in 2025) a year. He also received a 4,000 marks (Note: A medieval English mark was a unit of currency equivalent to two-thirds of a pound.) bond from Egrem to keep the peace towards Griffiths comments that "if elaborate ceremonial, royal prayer and example, monetary payments and the holding of hands could banish the personal and political differences of a decade, then Henry VI's 'Loveday' may be regarded as resounding success". However, argues Hicks, Salisbury must have set some store by the agreement as he later had an exemplification made for his personal use.

=== 1458–1459 ===
From 1457 Salisbury had to compete with Lancastrian loyalists in the north for authority. G. L. Harriss argues that their positions were deliberately augmented by the crown in order to counteract Salisbury; the main beneficiaries of this policy were the new Earl of Northumberland, the new Bishop of Durham and the Nevilles of Brancepeth. Salisbury still undertook royal service, for instance, in May 1458, being part of the embassy that undertook negotiations with the Duke of Burgundy. The same months he attended the reconvened Great Council of November 1457. Salisbury arrived with 500 armed men, which was 100 more than York, which, as Griffiths comments, must have been "an unnerving prospect for the city authorities".

By November Salisbury had decided to throw in his lot with York. He summoned his council to Middleham when it was later recorded, they decided to "to take full part with the full noble prince, the Duke of York". This suggests that military action was expected and may have been in response to a direct plea from the Duke to Salisbury.

On 10 May 1458, the King ordered his household to arm itself for a period of two months' service in the West Midlands. Thirteen days later, a Great Council convened in Coventry, from which Salisbury, York and Warwick were absent. Hicks suggests that they did so with either knowledge or suspicion that they would be charged with (probably treasonous) offences. In the event, nothing appears to have come of this council, as many lords—not just those sympathetic to York and the Nevilles—were also absent. However, Pollard suggests that it was this council that persuaded Salisbury to take the initiative and mobilise.

==== Blore Heath and Ludford ====
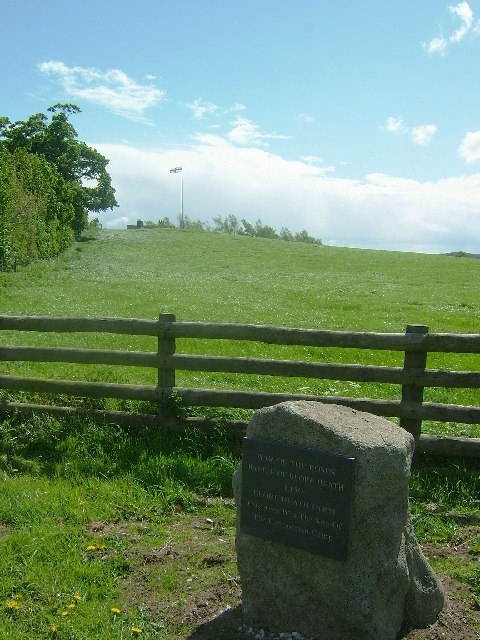
Site of the Battle of Blore Heath, September 1459, photographed in 2005

Salisbury passed the summer of 1459 in York, and in May he dictated his will. In September he gathered his northern tenantry and planned to join with York's force in Ludlow, alongside Warwick and the Calais garrison, who were probably expected later. Although lacking the large number of peers that the King could count among his support, the Yorkists' experienced troops meant that, according to Pollard, "two sides were not as ill-matched as a roll call of peers would suggest". He gathered men from Cumberland, Lancashire, and Yorkshire, and received support from leading local families such as the Stanleys—one of whom, William Stanley, provided Stanley with reinforcements—Harringtons, Conyers, Pickering and Parr. He probably had between 2,000 and 5,000 men—on what Pollard has described as "the journey that ended in disaster at Ludford"—he departed Middleham Castle. His wife and two sons accompanied him. Mustering his forces at Boroughbridge, Salisbury's intended route is now "obscured by effective royal countermeasures", says Hicks. The Earl was forced by the presence of the royal court at Kenilworth Castle to avoid Warwick's West Midlands heartlands which should have provided further opportunities for recruitment. This also forced him to travel via Cheshire where he only narrowly avoided an ambush on 21 September at Coleshill.

The size of Salisbury's force is difficult to ascertain. The later act of attainder speaks of him having 5,000 men, whereas Yorkist chronicles emphasise the small size of his force to the extent that it was vastly out-numbered by the royal army led by Lords Audley and Dudley. They probably led around 10,000 men; they may have outnumbered Salisbury by three to one. This, in turn, was only a portion of the royal force as a whole. (Note: Apart from that of Audley and Dudley, Queen Margaret had raised a large force in the northwest, and the king had many men in Warwickshire. English Heritage have identified the location of the battle as roughly straddling the modern A53 road on a southwest axis between Newcastle-under-Lyme and Market Drayton, about 3 miles east of the latter.) The battle lasted around four hours, between one and five o'clock in the afternoon. Salisbury "enjoyed the advantage of fighting on the defensive", says Robin Neillands, and, aligned along a brook, Audley was forced to attack uphill: "easy prey to the sweeping arrows of Salisbury's archers", comments Neillands. Although Salisbury won the encounter, in which Audley was killed, the immediate repercussions were that he was the first to be demonstratively guilty of treason and was thus excluded from all subsequent offers of pardon by the King. It may be that, while Salisbury's army comprised seasoned soldiers from the West March, the royal army may have contained "particularly green troops"; Audley himself was 59 years old, and, while he had gained much military experience in France, he had not fought since 1431. (Note: Griffiths suggests that Audley had a personal motive for wishing to fight Salisbury. Both Salisbury and York had inherited, through their wives, from the Holland family's inheritance on the death of the last Earl of Kent; Audley's wife should also have received a portion, but had been passed over, which he may have perceived as "a stain on her reputation".) E. F. Jacob speculates that around 500 of them defected to Salisbury's army. Pollard has described Salisbury's victory as "bloody and pyrrhic", (Note: A view shared by the medievalist Ian Rowney, who comments "the day certainly belonged to Salisbury who was thus able to force a way through to his allies at Ludlow, but this was for him and for England a pyrrhic victory. The real triumph lay with the extremists of the court faction, who now had the opportunity they had long sought for revenge. The decision to fight had been taken before Salisbury had left Middleham, a fact not unsuspected by him and contributing to his timing of the march south. All that was left to decide was the time and the site of the crucial opening battle; that was to be an afternoon in late autumn 1459 and on the bleak heathland of western Staffordshire".) as although he won the day, he arrived in Ludlow with a depleted army. (Note: An assessment by English Heritage has suggested that much of the battle's interest to historians lie in Salisbury's tactics, particularly the making a wagon laager into a point d'appui, which, it says, "revived a tactic" last used by the English army at the Battle of Verneuil in 1424, and that of Rouvray five years later. The chronicler Jean de Wavrin stated this was done both to protect Salisbury's flank and to protect his army's strong point.). He also arrived without his two sons, Thomas and John, who had been captured on the Nantwich–Tarporley road following the battle. (Note: Gregory's Chronicle reports how a Sir John Dwnn of Cheshire, knighted on the day of the battle was killed fighting for the King: "in the morning, between the battlefield and Cheshire, his son, who was at home in his father's place, had word that his father was slain. Anon he raised his tenants, and beside a little town named Tarporley took Sir Thomas Neville, Sir John Neville, and Sir Thomas Harrington, and brought them to Chester, and there they abode till the battle of Northampton".) They may have been captured while in pursuit of the defeated Lancastrian army and gone too far. Goodman suggests that their loss "jeopardised their father's enterprise" by forcing him to linger longer at Market Drayton than he would otherwise have done. While there, Salisbury received a letter from Thomas Stanley explaining how Stanley had been summoned to ride with the King but would continue to give the Earl "secret support". (Note: Stanley claimed that had he managed to reach the King in time, he would have argued for Salisbury to be admitted to Henry and for the Earl to be allowed to present his case. Griffiths suggests that Stanley felt himself poorly treated by the crown; his father had died in February but Stanley had not been given his father's local offices of Justiciar and Chamberlain of North Wales.) Stanley, says Colin Richmond, demonstrated a skill in "taking up arms and not using them"; although he hovered near the battlefield, he did not join it, and the next day sent a letter of congratulations to the earl, which nonetheless provided no material support and, says John Gillingham, left Salisbury "still in an awkward position" strategically even after his victory, which was, says Rowney, in any case short-lived.

Salisbury arrived in Ludlow on 25 September. On 10 October, Salisbury, York and Warwick sealed a tripartite indenture in Worcester Cathedral. Its contents are now lost, but Grummitt speculates that by this document the Duke and the two Earls bound themselves together against their enemies "saving their allegiance to the King". Having received the sacrements, Salisbury and his colleagues made an oath of loyalty to the King. They offered to attend him at Leominster and repeated the Yorkist claims from years before against the presence of traitors in the King's midst, poisoning Henry's mind against loyal subjects and wasting the royal estate. York and the Nevilles demanded that Henry put these advisors aside and return to the traditional model of government by the advice of his greatest lords, meaning themselves. The King offered them pardon, again, but the lords in Ludlow rejected the offer as it explicitly excluded Salisbury.

The King marched on Ludlow with a much larger force than the Yorkists had counted on; outnumbered, and with their battle plans known to the Lancastrian leaders, they fled Ludford on the night of the 12th/13 October.

==== Attainder ====
On 20 Nov 1459, parliament convened in Coventry. Salisbury and York were attainted for treason. Traditionally, those condemned of treason lost the estates they held in fee simple, but not that which was entailed for their wives or heirs. (Note: Hicks gives the example of Salibury's predecessor, executed as a rebel in 1400, who lost those lands he held as tenant-in-chief while "those entailed on [his] heirs were protected and subsequently many heirs were restored to the remainder also".) The Coventry Parliament–later known as the Parliament of Devils–deemed that the sin of treason was classed as so great that the heirs should suffer the sins of the father, and that the culprits' very blood was treasonous "not only were their lands forfeit, but they could not even be inherited by their heirs even if entailed on them". The attainder claims that the Yorkists were attempting to ambush the King at Kenilworth in a similar strategy to that they used at St Albans. It also questioned Salisbury's motives, claiming greed rather than principle: the Earl it was recorded, "had been given lavish gifts by the King, but had lusted for more". Salisbury's estates were taken into the King's hands, but almost immediately granted to Sir Ralph Grey, a cousin of the Earl's. Other of Salisbury's lands were given to John, Lord Neville, brother of the Earl of Westmorland.

Alice was subsequently alleged to have been engaged in domestic treasonous activity by 1 August 1459. There "may be some truth in this", argues Paul Johnson, as around this time the Neville bailiff of Bawtry was accused of inciting his colleagues to treasonable acts. Alice's attainder accused her of "imagining and compassing the King's death and also of stirring and provoking" her menfolk into rebellion. A letter from Salisbury to Queen Margaret still exists in which he denies allegations of treason, and it can most probably be dated from 1459. The Earl does not specify the precise nature of these accusations, merely denying both treasonous speech and thought and refuting the suggestion that Warwick or York had done likewise ("but doubtless they would deny it themselves").

== Exile and return ==
Salisbury, March and Warwick were aided by John Dynham, who hid them in his mother's house before managing to hire a ship. Alice travelled with York to Dublin. She may, suggests A. J. Pollard has acted as a go-between for her husband and his comrades in Calais; she was also attainted with the men, possibly because, suggests Griffiths, because she was a "rich heiress in her own right". Inclement weather forced them to shelter in Guernsey—at the time held by a retainer of Warwick's—before entering Calais on 2 November 1459. They were, comments Paul Murray Kendall, "warmly welcomed". Salisbury proclaimed his loyalty to the King even in exile. After the capture of Lord Rivers, a Paston letter describes how "my lord of Salesbury reheted hym, calling hym knaves son that he should be so rude to calle hym and there other lordes traytors, for they shull be found the kyngys true liegemen when he schuld be found a traytor etc". (Note: "Reheted" is Middle English meaning to reprove, berate or rebuke.) The Yorkist lords "spent eight productive months in Calais", raising funds and gathering an army, as well as regularly releasing propaganda against the King's advisors. They also launched regular raids on the Kent coast, the last time five days before returning from exile. They also successfully repelled attempts by the Duke of Somerset to evict them.

Leaving Alice in Calais with Warwick's wife Anne, the Yorkist lords left Calais on 26 June 1460. Anthony Tuck argues that by now Salisbury and his colleagues "had nothing to lose and much to gain by renewing the civil war". The returning rebels landed at Sandwich, along with Lord Dudley—who had changed allegiance—and a force of around 2,000 men. They were also joined by a number of Kentish captains on landing. As they marched through Kent on their way to London, they stopped at Canterbury, where there was similar sympathy to them. A ballad was posted to the town gates welcoming them. Hicks has suggested that the Yorkists' return and swift recovery is "all the more remarkable" because the bridgehead they chose in Kent was about as far from their respective powerhouses in the West, Midlands and the north as could be.

Following the entry of the Yorkist lords into London, (Note: The Mayor and common council, says Caroline Barron, "were not prepared to see the city sacked for the cause of Henry VI", and so allowed the Yorkists peaceable entry.) Salisbury was deputed to remain in the city and oversee the siege of the Tower, then in possession of leading Lancastrians including Lords Scales, Hungerford, Lovel, de la Warre and Vesci. Salisbury was probably chosen because, while March was York's representative and Warwick could be expected to recruit heavily in the midlands, Salisbury was too far from the Neville heartlands to contribute to the campaign. Retaking the Tower was a matter of urgency for Salisbury, as the moment the Yorkists had been allowed entry, Scales and Hungerford began strafing the city with the Tower's artillery, killing several Londoners. Salisbury, with Lords Wenlock, Audley and Cobham continued recruiting in London. Salisbury received personal loans of up to 500 marks from the Common Council for military expenses, and had 2,000 men to both defend the city and besiege the Tower. This was done from both land and river, although the majority of the Yorkist army was on its way to Northampton. A contemporary poem, using puns and metaphor, (Note: Salisbury is referred to by his personal cognizance, an eagle, and the poem tells how he caught the "fysshe", a pun on Lord Scales.) praised Salisbury's handling of the siege. The Earls of March and Warwick re-entered London on 16 July, and the Tower surrendered three days later. One of Salsbury's immediate concerns after its fall was the restoration of law and order in the city, and in early July he led a commission at the Guildhall, which resulted in several executions.

And coming there he walked straight on, until he came to the King's throne, upon the covering or cushion on which laying his hand, in this very act like a man about to take possession of his right, he held it upon it for a short time. But at length withdrawing it, he turned his face to the people, standing quietly under the canopy of royal state, he looked eagerly for their applause.

— Abbot Whethamstede of St. Albans Abbey, reporting on York's entrance into Westminster.

The speed with which Warwick and March sought out King Henry's army indicates, says Griffiths, that they "did not flinch from confrontation. This took place at Northampton on 10 July 1460 and resulted in a decisive Yorkist victory and the deaths of several leading Lancastrian lords, including the Nevilles' enemy Egremont. Salisbury's sons Thomas and John were released into the care of Thomas, Lord Stanley. Salisbury escorted the King to Canterbury on 2 August, where they celebrated Evensong together and thanked God for the Yorkist victory. Around the same time, Salisbury was planning on marching to the assistance of Roxburgh Castle, which was under siege by James II of Scotland. In the event, on 3 August a cannon exploded and blew the King's leg off; with his death three days later, the siege ended before Salisbury left London. Possibly as a reward for his work in London, or possibly at his own request Salisbury was appointed chamberlain of the royal household. He immediately purged it of those whose loyalties were suspect. He was also appointed, with Warwick, to the stewardship of the Duchy of Lancaster.

In October, York returned to England; he did not hide his dynastic ambitions. Following his landing near Chester in early September 1460, charters and letters signed under his seal began omitting reference to the regnal year, which according to the historian Charles Ross was "quite out of conformity with usual practice". This proclaimed York's royal blood to all. On entering London, his sword was borne aloft before him, as at a coronation. (Note: The early 15th-century chronicler Thomas Walsingham described how, at Richard II's coronation, the new King's "sword was born aloft before him by Simon Burley".) Rather than just his traditional Mortimer quarterings, his trumpeters' banners were emblazoned with the Arms of England, in the manner of a king.

Salisbury appears to have been offended at York's attack on the royal prerogative, and Bertram Wolffe suggests that Salisbury felt that his oaths of loyalty to Henry had been politically useful. The Earl delegated Thomas as his emissary to York in October 1460, after the Duke had formally claimed the throne. Thomas was able to persuade York against pursuing coronation; Johnson suggests that, although the course of their discussion is now unknown, "Neville's mandate must have been both blunt and bluntly delivered". (Note: Griffiths suggests that York entirely misread the situation, possibly due to his having been isolated in Dublin for over a year, and "separated from his most influential allies and councillors—notably Salisbury".) Pollard suggests that York's colleagues knew of his plan but had deliberately concealed the information from Salisbury, in the expectation that he would otherwise oppose them.

=== Wakefield and death ===
The Lancastrian lords had meanwhile been busy recruiting in the north for the King; Margaret of Anjou's biographer, Helen Maurer, argues that the Yorkists were distracted by the parliament they were organising for October 1460, which was intended to overturn the confiscations of the previous year. This was not easy. Although Salisbury regained Middleham and Sheriff Hutton with relative ease, Lancastrian rebels, led by the Earl of Northumberland and Lords Clifford, Dacre and Neville of Raby "indulge[d] in an orgy of looting" of Salibury's and York's northern estates. This may have limited Salisbury's ability to raise funds, although his affinity remained cohesive. Other castles remained out of his hands; Pontefract, for example—of which Salisbury had been steward—remained occupied by Northumberland.

The Yorkist lords left London on 2 December 1460 to restore order to the region, arriving at York's Sandal Castle on the 21st. Nine days later, York, his son Edmund, Earl of Rutland, Salisbury, Thomas, and many of their closest retainers led a sortie in strength to attack a Lancastrian army gathered near the castle. Details of the Battle of Wakefield are sparse, but the Yorkists—possibly outnumbered three to one—are known to have suffered a crushing defeat. York and Thomas Neville died on the field. Rutland and Salisbury both attempted escape; Rutland was probably knifed by Lord Clifford on Wakefield Bridge, while Salisbury was captured after the battle, and executed the next day at Pontefract Castle.

== Aftermath ==
Wakefield was a severe blow to the Yorkists, but the war was not over. Even after news of the defeat reached Edward, now Duke of York, in the Welsh Marches, he continued recruiting a large army. Edward made his way to London, where he met Warwick, and was immediately proclaimed King Edward IV on 4 March. The victorious Lancastrian army had retreated to the north and still posed a threat to the new regime. Accordingly, Edward raised a large army and followed them. On 29 March 1461, the two forces clashed at the Battle of Towton, in what has been described as "probably the largest and bloodiest battle on English soil". (Note: Other similar descriptions of Towton from historians are as "Britain's bloodiest day in a long history of sanguinary conflict", "the largest, longest fought, and bloodiest day in English medieval history", "the biggest, longest and bloodiest military engagement on British soil", "the costliest encounter ever fought on British soil", and that "in the modern-day world, where something has to be the biggest, longest, even bloodiest, in order to be remarkable, then Towton has many claims to be that singular event on English soil".) The result was a decisive victory for the Yorkists, and on 28 June 1461 Edward IV was crowned at Westminster Abbey.

Alice subsequently accused ten men of complicity in Salisbury's death. One of the highest-ranking of her targets was William Plumpton. He was bound over for £1,000 (equivalent to £980,000 in 2025), but this being too large a sum for him to hope to pay, was subsequently dispatched to the Tower of London. However, overall, only two of those named by Alice were attainted in Edward's first parliament of November 1461.

On 5 August 1461, Alice was licensed to enter her Montagu and Holland inheritances as well as those lands of Neville that he had held in fee simple. Hicks has argued that after Salisbury's death, Alice and Warwick took advantage of the new Yorkist government to irregularly—indeed, "fraudulently—gain manors previously held by St John's Priory. She and Salisbury had done something similar in 1441, and, says Hicks, this suggests that in 1461, it was her idea to do so again, as Warwick was a minor on the first occasion. Continues Hicks, her "distortion of history enabled her to recover lands to which she was not entitled". (Note: Hicks comments, "although historians should avoid moral judgements, one should consider more closely what Alice and her son had done. They seized manors to which they had no right from the legal owner. They had taken lands held in mortmain, dedicated to God's service and charitable purpose. They had done this in defiance of the donor's intentions, although he was both a cardinal and a kinsman with whom they had enjoyed close relations. Their action was ungrateful, shocking, even sacrilegious") Alice was also influential in obtaining a royal pardon for William Catesby, a member of the local gentry, who had fought with his uncle Robert at Towton. Alice died before 9 December 1462. (Note: Says Michael Hicks on her brief widowhood, "a dowager's longevity could not be counted on and was an unusual basis for planning the future. Nobody knew when she would die—some widowhoods were brief".)

=== Reinterment ===
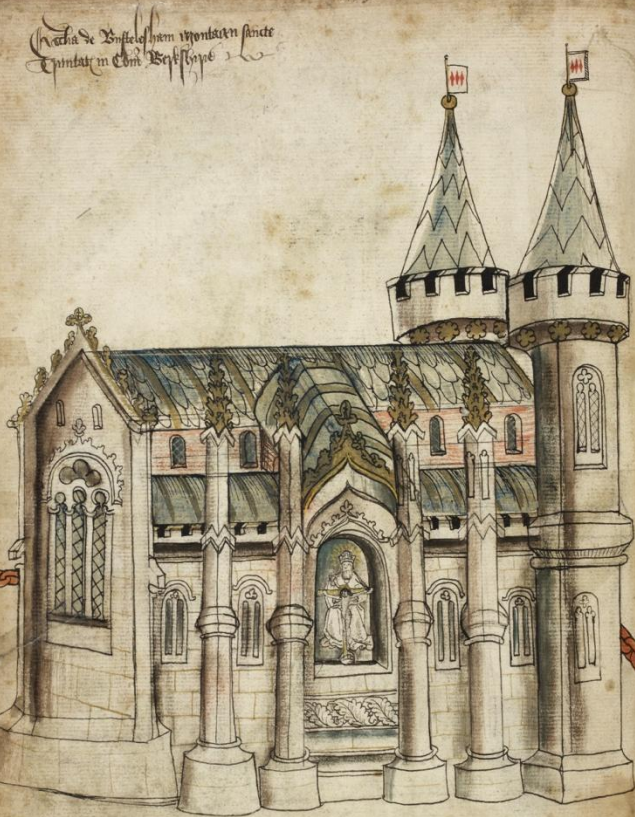
Bisham Priory Church, the traditional resting place of the Earls of Salisbury, as depicted in the Salisbury Roll of 1483-85.

Alice died in 1462; two years later Salisbury and Thomas—in what Nigel Saul has described as a "dramatic act of family piety".—were reinterred with her in the Montague mausoleum of Bisham Priory, Buckinghamshire. (Note: The scholar Alexandra Buckle argues that this was in keeping for the period, which saw "a fashion for the re-internment of relatives among the noble elite". It probably served as the blueprint for Edward IV's reinternment of his father and brother in 1476.) Both the mausoleum its adjoining parclose screens draped in white damask. Salibury's choice of Bisham for his final resting place—rather than the Neville heartlands of northern England—was probably based on a perceived political benefit with being associated with the Montagu family, as well as the proximity of Bisham to Windsor Castle.

=== Children ===
Salisbury and Alice Beauchamp had been married for three years before they had children; after that, says Hicks, "they came thick and fast". Joan, their eldest, had been born by 2 November 1424. She was followed by Cecily in 1424, Richard in 1428, and then "in rapid succession" came Thomas, John and George. By 1431 he had three sons and two daughters, and by 1442 they had had another three daughters (Alice, Eleanor and Katherine) as well as two sons (Robert and Ralph) who died young. Margaret, the couple's last child, was born at an unknown date. The Neville clan grew up to be, as expected, the highly-privileged children of a Lancastrian magnate, with Salisbury at its head. The Neville family had something of a history of making sound and profitable marriages. There were few great heiresses in this period available for Salisbury's sons, and they had perforce to make more "muted" marriages, says Pollard, particularly compared to the great marriages his father had arranged for Salisbury and his siblings. There were, though, rather better marriages available to his daughters. Apart from Richard and Cecily's double marriage of 1436, Joan married William, Earl of Arundel in 1438, Thomas married Maud Stanhope in 1453, Eleanor married Thomas Stanley the following year, John married Isabelle Ingaldsthorpe in 1457, Alice Neville married Lord FitzHugh and Katherine had married William, Lord Harington by 1459. Hicks suggests that, while these marriages to the northern gentry were "respectable", they could not compare to those his father had been able to make. Salisbury's "hark[ed] back to an earlier era when the Nevilles had operated within the more restricted northern marriage market". (Note: Hicks believes, though, that they not intended to immediately profitable, but were rather intended to pay out in the future.)

Hicks also speculates that Salisbury's relationship with his eldest son was copper-fastened after the encounter at Topcliffe in 1453 when Warwick swiftly secured his inheritance in the Welsh Marches and then returned to the north "surely in response to his father's urgent summons". From that point, he says, they were both "active and inseparable" in national and regional politics, and Warwick was able to throw off "paternal direction". In return for Salisbury's support of Lord Bonville in his feud with the Earl of Devon, Salisbury requested Bonville to support the provision of Salisbury's youngest son George to the Bishopric of Exeter.

Salisbury employed Thomas—"vigorous and youthful"—as his deputy on the West March, for which Thomas was paid £500 (equivalent to £490,000 in 2025) a year; he also appointed Thomas Steward of Bolton and, with John, joint steward of Pontefract, Knaresborough and Pickering as Salisbury's representatives. Thomas also performed his uncle Fauconberg's office of steward of the Palatinate of Durham during Fauconberg's absence in France. There are signs that in the period following St Albans, the Crown attempted to retain Thomas's loyalty—as it did Salisbury's—with the grant of the office of joint Chamberlain of the Exchequer. Thomas's marriage to Maud Stanhope was intended to bring him, says Hicks—as she was co-heiress Lord Cromwell ("the richest non-magnate of the time") "an estate of genuinely comital proportions".

Thomas and John were knighted together in the Tower on 5 January 1453; the following year, they worked together on the West Riding peace commission headed by Salisbury. Thomas and John—since Warwick was mostly occupied on the Welsh March—"bore the brunt of Neville defence" for Salisbury against the Percies. Indeed, Pollard argues, not only were they fighting the Percies, but they were defending the border with Scotland also: "in this, they proved notably more successful than their father". Both Thomas and John's belligerence against the Percy sons—which was fully reciprocated—undoubtedly caused the outbreak of violence.

Griffiths has described John as "a reckless younger son" who "acted with considerable independence", and who, during the feud with the Percies, acted as his father's champion. John's independence, suggests Griffiths, stemmed from the fact that, unlike their fathers, aristocratic younger sons did not possess an advisory council. The Earl and Countess jointly settled eight manors on John Neville, on the occasion of his wedding to Isabella Ingaldsthorpe, which took place on 22 April 1457. The Queen—whose ward Isabell was—appears to have approved of the arrangement, for which Salisbury was to pay her £1,000 over six years.In his will, Salisbury left his children "conventional bequests", including the Countess of Arundel, Lady Fitzhugh, and Lady Stanley. He also provided a 1,000 mark marriage portion for Margaret, who was intended to marry the Earl of Oxford's second son, John de Vere.

== Character ==
Hicks describes Salisbury as "the prudent Salisbury, royal, wise, and undefeated"; a contemporary poem also calls him "prudence". Hicks also suggests that while he was capable of outright fraud in pursuit of augmenting his estates, he often demonstrated a "political shrewdness" when he did so. This protection and accumulation of estates, comments Charles Ross, was not confined to the Earl, but was a "hallmark" of Salisbury's family. He was a "hard-headed" political operator, suggests Storey, and a "shrewd and capable soldier and politician". He was "much abashed", according to Waurin, when going into exile, his sailors did not know the way around the Cornish peninsular to France. Waurin also called him "sage et ymaginitif", in contrast to Kendall's assessment of the Earl as "a plain, prudent man, rather colourless in personality but vigorous in the conduct of affairs". Griffiths suggests that Salisbury was the most sensitive of the lords in exile as to accusations of treason, as demonstrated by the treatment meted out to Lord Rivers in Calais. It is likely, says Pollard, that Salisbury was always the "more reluctant rebel", possibly as a result of a conciliarism ingrained into him on his earliest days at the royal court. Salisbury did not seem to be offended by York's anti-Northern propaganda in winter 1460, even though the Earl and his family were "northerners by birth and inclination." Both David Hipshon and Anthony Goodman have argued as to Salisbury's bravery in battle. The former calls the Earl a "seasoned campaigner of great ability and experience". He suggests that, while his escape may have been indicative of "desperate courage ... the fact that he confronted and defeated a force possibly three times the size of his own is surely indicative of a steadier normal courage". Storey has described Salisbury as "one of the outstanding figures of his day, a man with solid qualities to match the eminence which birth and great estates assured him", whose historiographical reputation has been overshadowed by that of his eldest son.

On the other hand, says Pollard, Salisbury "was a hard-headed, ambitious man", and in building up the wealth and power that he did must have made enemies; "to many he no doubt received his just deserts on 31 December 1460". He appears to have been reasonably popular with his Middleham retainers. A pro-Yorkist poem called The Battle of Towton described him in glowing terms as "the proud leopard of Salisbury, he gaped his guns wide / Blessid be the time that ever God spread that flower".

== Bibliography ==
- Allan, A. R. (1981). Political Propaganda Employed by the House of York in England in the Mid-Fifteenth Century, 1450–1471 (PhD thesis). University of Wales. OCLC 753862353.
- Arnold, C. E. (1984). A Political Study of the West Riding of Yorkshire (DPhil thesis). University of Oxford. OCLC 557301469.
- Arvanigian, M. (2004). "The 'Lancastrianization' of the North". Reputation and Representation in Fifteenth Century Europe. Leiden: Brill. pp. 9–38. ISBN 978-9-00413-613-7.
- Arvanigian, M. (2013). "Henry V and the Far North of England". In Dodd, G. (ed.). Henry V: New Interpretations. Woodbridge: Boydell & Brewer. pp. 77–103. ISBN 978-1-90315-346-8.
- Bagley, J. J. (1948). Margaret of Anjou: Queen of England. London: H. Jenkins. OCLC 78204206.
- Baldwin, J. F. (1913). The King's Council in England During the Middle Ages. Oxford: Clarendon Pres. OCLC 1155222.
- Barron, C. M. (1981). "London and the Crown, 1451-1461". In HighfieldJ. R.JeffsR. (ed.). The Crown and Local Communities in England and France in the Fifteenth Century. Gloucester: Alan Sutton. pp. 88–109. ISBN 978-0-90438-767-4.
- Bean, J. M. W. (1958). The Estates of the Percy Family, 1416–1537. Oxford Historical Series. London: Oxford University Press. OCLC 234317.
- Bean, J. M. W. (1989). From Lord to Patron: Lordship in Late Medieval England. Manchester: Manchester University Press. ISBN 978-0-71902-855-7.
- Bicheno, H. (2017). Battle Royal: The Wars of the Roses: 1440–1462. London: Pegasus. ISBN 978-1-68177-371-1.
- Boardman, A. W. (1994). The Battle of Towton (1st ed.). Stroud: Alan Sutton. ISBN 978-0-75091-245-7.
- Booth, P. W. B. (1997). Landed society in Cumberland and Westmorland, c.1440–1485: The Politics of the Wars of the Roses (PhD thesis). University of Leicester. OCLC 1065379737.
- Booth, P. W. B. (2003). "Men Behaving Badly: The West March Towards Scotland and the Percy-Neville Feud". In Clark, L. (ed.). Authority and Subversion. The Fifteenth Century. Vol. III. Woodbridge: Boydell & Brewer. pp. 95–116. ISBN 978-1-84383-025-2.
- Buckle, A. (2013). "'Entumbid Right Princely': The Re-interment of Richard Beauchamp, Earl of Warwick, and a Lost Rite". In Kleineke, H.; Steer, C. (eds.). The Yorkist Age: Proceedings of the 2011 Harlaxton Symposium. Harlaxton Medieval Studies XXIII (New Series). Donnington: Shaun Tyas. pp. 399–415. ISBN 978-1-90773-0-221.
- Butcher, R. (2004). "Propaganda in the Prepared Parliamentary Speeches of 1455–1461". The Ricardian. 14: 1–10. OCLC 906456722.
- Carpenter, C. (1992). Locality and Polity: A Study of Warwickshire Landed Society, 1401–1499. Cambridge: Cambridge University Press. ISBN 978-0-52137-016-5.
- Carpenter, C. (1997). The Wars of the Roses: Politics and the Constitution in England, c.1437–1509. Cambridge: Cambridge University Press. ISBN 978-0-52131-874-7.
- Castor, H. (2006). Blood and Roses: One Family's Struggle and Triumph During the Tumultuous Wars of the Roses. New York: HarperCollins. ISBN 978-0-00714-808-0.
- Cherry, M. (1981). The Crown and the political community in Devonshire, 1377–1461 (PhD thesis). University of Wales. OCLC 53569981.
- Collins, H. (1996). "The Order of the Garter, 1348–1461: Chivalry and Politics in Later Medieval England". In Dunn, D. E. (ed.). Courts, Counties and the Capital in the Later Middle Ages. Gloucester: Sutton. pp. 155–180. ISBN 978-0-75091-149-8.
- Compton Reeves, A. (1998). "Lawrence Booth: Bishop of Durham (1457–76), Archbishop of York (1476–80)". In Michalove, S. D.; Compton Reeves, A. (eds.). Estrangement, Enterprise and Education in Fifteenth-Century England. Stroud: Sutton. pp. 63–88. ISBN 978-0-75091-384-3.
- Curry, A. E. (1985). Military Organization in Lancastrian Normandy 1422–1450 (PhD thesis). University of Teesside. OCLC 53671539.
- Davies, R. (2004). "Kemp [Kempe], John (1380/81–1454), Administrator, Cardinal, and Archbishop of York and of Canterbury". doi:10.1093/ref:odnb/15328. Archived from the original on 10 April 2026.
- Devine, M. (2006). Richmondshire 1372–1445 (PhD thesis). University of Teesside. OCLC 500655390.
- Dobson, R. B. (2004). "Wessington, John (c.1371–1451)". Oxford Dictionary of National Biography. Archived from the original on 10 April 2026.
- English Heritage (1995). Battlefield Report: Blore Heath 1459 (Report). English Heritage.
- Evans, H. T. (1995). Wales and the Wars of the Roses. Stroud: Alan Sutton. ISBN 978-1-10745-587-0.
- Flenley, R. (1910). "London and Foreign Merchants in the Reign of Henry VI". English Historical Review. 25: 644–655. doi:10.1093/ehr/XXV.C.644. OCLC 818916436.
- Fryde, E. B.; Powicke, F. M., eds. (1961). Handbook of British Chronology (2nd ed.). London: Royal Historical Society. OCLC 643554409.
- Gillingham, J. (1993). The Wars of the Roses: Peace and Conflict in Fifteenth-Century England. London: Weidenfeld and Nicolson. ISBN 978-0-29782-016-1.
- Given-Wilson, C. (1987). The English Nobility in the Later Middle Ages. London: Routledge. ISBN 978-0-20344-126-8.
- Goodman, A. (1996). The Wars of the Roses (2nd ed.). New York: Barnes and Noble. ISBN 978-0-88029-484-3.
- Goodwin, G. (2011). Fatal Colours: Towton, 1461: England's Most Brutal Battle. London: Orion. ISBN 978-0-29786-072-3.
- Gransden, A. (1996). Historical Writing in England: c.1307 to the Early Sixteenth Century. Vol. II. London: Routledge. ISBN 978-0-41515-125-2.
- Gravett, C. (2003). Towton 1461: England's Bloodiest Battle. Oxford: Osprey Publishing. ISBN 978-1-84176-513-6.
- Griffiths, R.A. (1968). "Local Rivalries and National Politics: The Percies, the Nevilles, and the Duke of Exeter, 1452–1455". Speculum. 43: 589–632. doi:10.2307/2855323. JSTOR 2855323. OCLC 35134109. S2CID 155012397.
- Griffiths, R. A. (1975). "Duke Richard of York's Intentions in 1450 and the Origins of the Wars of the Roses". Journal of Medieval History. 1 (2): 187–209. doi:10.1016/0304-4181(75)90023-8. OCLC 67397111.
- Griffiths, R. A. (1980). "Public and Private Bureaucracies in England and Wales in the Fifteenth Century". Transactions of the Royal Historical Society. 30: 109–130. doi:10.2307/3679005. JSTOR 3679005. OCLC 863051958.
- Griffiths, R. A. (1981). The Reign of King Henry VI: The Exercise of Royal Authority, 1422–1461. Berkeley, CA: University of California Press. ISBN 978-0-52004-372-5.
- Griffiths, R.A. (1984). "The King's Council and the First Protectorate of the Duke of York, 1453-1454". English Historical Review. 99: 67–82. doi:10.1093/ehr/XCIX.CCCXC.67. OCLC 1099048890.
- Grummitt, D. (2013). A Short History of the Wars of the Roses. New York, NY: I. B. Tauris. ISBN 978-0-85773-303-0.
- Gue, E. J. (1983). The Education and Literary Interests of the English Lay Nobility, c.1150–c.1540 (DPhil thesis). University of Oxford. OCLC 68715361.
- Haigh, P. A. (1996). The Battle of Wakefield 1460. Stroud: Sutton. ISBN 978-0-75091-342-3.
- Haigh, P. A. (2002). From Wakefield to Towton: The Wars of the Roses. Bradford: Leo Cooper. ISBN 978-0-85052-825-1.
- Harding, V. (2002). The Dead and the Living in Paris and London, 1500–1670. Cambridge: Cambridge University Press. ISBN 978-0-52181-126-2.
- Harriss, G. L. (1988). Cardinal Beaufort: A Study of Lancastrian Ascendancy and Decline. Oxford: Clarendon Press. ISBN 978-0-19820-135-9.
- Harriss, G. L. (2005). Shaping the Nation: England 1360–1461. Oxford: Oxford University Press. ISBN 978-0-19921-119-7.
- Hicks, M. A. (1979). "Descent, Partition and Extinction: The 'Warwick Inheritance'". Historical Research. 52 (126): 116–128. doi:10.1111/j.1468-2281.1979.tb02217.x. OCLC 300188139.
- Hicks, M. A. (1980). "The Neville Earldom of Salisbury 1429–1471". Wiltshire Archaeological Magazine. 73: 141–147. OCLC 476532083.
- Hicks, M.A. (1983). "The Warwick Inheritance—Springboard to the Throne". The Ricardian. 6: 174–181. OCLC 1006085142.
- Hicks, M. A. (1991). Who's Who in Late Medieval England: 1272–1486. London: Shepheard-Walwyn. ISBN 978-0-85683-092-1.
- Hicks, M. A. (1995). Bastard Feudalism. London: Routledge. ISBN 978-1-31789-896-2.
- Hicks, M. A. (1998). Warwick the Kingmaker. Oxford: Blackwell. ISBN 978-0-47075-193-0.
- Hicks, M. A. (2002). English Political Culture in the Fifteenth Century. London: Routledge. ISBN 978-1-13460-344-2.
- Hicks, M. A. (2010). The Wars of the Roses. London: Yale University Press. ISBN 978-0-30018-157-9.
- Hipshon, D. (2009). Richard III and the Death of Chivalry. London: History Press. ISBN 978-0-75246-915-7.
- Hodges, G. (1984). "The Civil War of 1459 to 1461 in the Welsh Marches II: The Campaign and Battle of Mortimer's Cross, St Blaise's Day 3 February 1461". The Ricardian. 6: 330–345. OCLC 11995669.
- Jacob, E. F. (1993). The Fifteenth Century, 1399–1485 (repr. ed.). Oxford: Oxford University Press. ISBN 978-0-19285-286-1.
- Johnson, P. A. (1988). Duke Richard of York 1411–1460. Oxford: Clarendon Press. ISBN 978-0-19820-268-4.
- Jones, M. K. (1997). "Edward IV, the Earl of Warwick and the Yorkist Claim to the Throne". Historical Research. 70 (173): 342–352. doi:10.1111/1468-2281.00048.
- Keen, M. H. (2003). England in the later Middle Ages: A Political History (2nd ed.). London: Routledge. ISBN 978-0-41527-293-3.
- Kendall, P. M. (1955). Richard the Third. London: Allen & Unwin. OCLC 1114837672.
- Kendall, P. M. (1957). Warwick the Kingmaker. London: Allen & Unwin. OCLC 12870600.
- Lander, J. R. (1980). Government and Community: England, 1450–1509. Cambridge, MA: Harvard University Press. ISBN 978-0-67435-794-5.
- Lander, J. R. (1986). "Family, 'Friends' and Politics in Fifteenth-Century England". In Griffiths, R. A.; Sherborne, J. (eds.). Kings and Nobles in the Later Middle Ages: A Tribute to Charles Derek Ross. London: St Martin's Press. pp. 27–40. ISBN 978-0-31200-080-6.
- Lewis, M. (2015). The Wars of the Roses: The Key Players in the Struggle for Supremacy. Stroud: Amberley. ISBN 978-1-44564-636-7.
- Liddy, C. D. (2008). The Bishopric of Durham in the Late Middle Ages: Lordship, Community and the Cult of St Cuthbert. Woodbridge: Boydell & Brewer. ISBN 978-1-84383-377-2.
- Loades, D. M. (1988). Politics and Nation: England 1450–1660 (3rd ed.). London: Fontana. ISBN 978-0-00686-013-6.
- Maurer, H. E. (2003). Margaret of Anjou: Queenship and Power in Late Medieval England. Woodbridge: Boydell Press. ISBN 978-1-84383-104-4.
- McCulloch, D.; Jones, E. D. (1983). "Lancastrian Politics, the French War, and the Rise of the Popular Element". Speculum. 58: 95–138. doi:10.2307/2846615. JSTOR 2846615. OCLC 35134109. S2CID 154721746.
- McGoldrick, M. J. (1985). The Literary Manuscripts and Literary Patronage of the Beauchamp and Neville Families in the Late Middle Ages, c.1390–1500 (PhD thesis). University of Newcastle. OCLC 500655390.
- M. E. D. (2026). "Rehēte n.". Middle English Dictionary. Ann Arbor: University of Michigan. OCLC 13262322.
- Mercer, M. (2010). The Medieval Gentry: Power, Leadership and Choice during the Wars of the Roses. London: Bloomsbury. ISBN 978-1-44114-083-8.
- Moran, J. O. H. (2014). The Growth of English Schooling, 1340–1548: Learning, Literacy, and Laicization in Pre-Reformation York Diocese. Princeton: Princeton University Press. ISBN 978-1-40085-616-9.
- Neillands, R. (1999). The Wars of the Roses (repr. ed.). London: Brockhampton Press. ISBN 978-0-30436-316-2.
- Ormrod, W. M. (1995). Political Life in Medieval England 1300–1450. London: Macmillan. ISBN 978-1-34924-128-6.
- Payling, S. J. (1989). "The Ampthill Dispute: A Study in Aristocratic Lawlessness and the Breakdown of Lancastrian Government". English Historical Review. 104: 881–907. OCLC 818916436.
- Payling, S. J. (2011). "Legal Right and Dispute Resolution in Late Medieval England: the Sale of the Lordship of Dunster". English Historical Review. 126 (518): 17–43. doi:10.1093/ehr/ceq376. OCLC 818916436.
- Payling, S. J. (2013). "Edward IV and the Politics of Conciliation in the Early 1460s". In Kleineke, H.; Steer, C. (eds.). The Yorkist Age: Proceedings of the 2011 Harlaxton Symposium. Harlaxton Medieval Studies XXIII (New Series). Donnington: Shaun Tyas. pp. 81–94. ISBN 978-1-90773-0-221.
- Pearsall, D. (2013). "Was there a Yorkist Literature?". In Kleineke, H. (ed.). The Yorkist Age: Proceedings of the 2011 Harlaxton Symposium. Donnington: Shawn Tyas. pp. 221–236. ISBN 978-1-90773-022-1.
- Petre, J. (1979). "The Nevilles of Brancepeth and Raby, 1425–1499: I". The Ricardian. 5. OCLC 1006085142.
- Pollard, A. J. (1976). "The Northern Retainers of Richard Nevill, Earl of Salisbury". Northern History. 11: 52–69. doi:10.1179/nhi.1976.11.1.52. OCLC 1001980641.
- Pollard, A. J. (1986). "'St Cuthbert and the Hog': Richard III and the County Palatine of Durham, 1471–85". In Griffiths, R. A.; Sherborne, J. (eds.). Kings and Nobles in the Later Middle Ages: A Tribute to Charles Derek Ross. London: St Martin's Press. pp. 27–40. ISBN 978-0-31200-080-6.
- Pollard, A. J. (1990). North-Eastern England during the Wars of the Roses: Lay Society, War, and Politics 1450–1500. Oxford: Clarendon Press. ISBN 978-0-19820-087-1.
- Pollard, A. J. (2000). Late Medieval England, 1399–1509. Harlow: Longman. ISBN 978-0-58203-135-7.
- Pollard, A. J. (2001). The Wars of the Roses. Basingstoke: Macmillan. ISBN 978-0-33365-822-2.
- Pollard, A. J. (2004). "Neville, Richard, Fifth Earl of Salisbury (1400–1460)". Oxford. doi:10.1093/ref:odnb/19954. ISBN 978-0-19-861412-8. Archived from the original on 10 April 2026.
- Pollard, A. J. (2005). John Talbot and the War in France 1427–1453 (repr. ed.). Barnsley: Pen and Sword. ISBN 978-1-84415-247-6.
- Pollard, A. J. (2007). Warwick the Kingmaker: Politics, Power and Fame. London: Hambledon Continuum. ISBN 978-1-84725-182-4.
- Pollard, A. J. (2016). Edward IV: The Summer King. Penguin Monarchs. London: Penguin. ISBN 978-0-14197-870-3.
- Pugh, T. B. (1986). "Richard Plantagenet (1411–60), Duke of York, as the King's Lieutenant in France and Ireland". In Rowe, J. G. (ed.). Aspects of Late Medieval Government and Society: Essays Presented to J.R. Lander. Toronto: University of Toronto Press. pp. 107–41. ISBN 978-0-80205-695-5.
- Pushon, M. C. (2002). Government and Society in the West Riding of Yorkshire, 1399–1461 (DPhil thesis). University of Oxford. OCLC 499345819.
- Ramsay, J. H. (1892). Lancaster and York: A Century of English History (A.D.1399–1485). Oxford: Clarendon. OCLC 162857381.
- Richmond, C. (1977). "The Nobility and the Wars of the Roses, 1459–61". Nottingham Medieval Studies. 21: 71–86. doi:10.1484/J.NMS.3.80. OCLC 1116161624.
- Roskell, J. S. (1981). Parliament and Politics in Late Medieval England. Vol. II. London: Hambledon. ISBN 978-0-95068-829-9.
- Ross, C. D. (1950). The Yorkshire Baronage, 1399–1435 (PhD). University of Oxford. OCLC 54930299.
- Ross, C. D. (1975). Edward IV. Berkeley: University of California Press. ISBN 978-0-52002-781-7.
- Ross, C. D. (1986). The Wars of the Roses: A Concise History. London: Thames and Hudson. ISBN 978-0-50027-407-1.
- Ross, J. A. (2011). The Foremost Man of the Kingdom: John de Vere, Thirteenth Earl of Oxford (1442–1513). Woodbridge: Boydell and Brewer. ISBN 978-1-78327-005-7.
- Rowland, D. (2012). "The End of the Statute Rolls: Manuscript, Print and Language Change in Fifteenth-Century English Statutes". In Clark, L. (ed.). Concerns and Preoccupations. The Fifteenth Century. Vol. XI. Woodbridge: Boydell & Brewer. pp. 107–125. ISBN 978-1-78204-019-4.
- Rowney, I. D. (1981). The Staffordshire Political Community 1440–1500 (PhD thesis). University of Keeele. OCLC 276948606.
- Sadler, J. (2011). Towton: The Battle of Palmsunday Field 1461. Barnsley: Pen & Sword. ISBN 978-1-84415-965-9.
- Saul, N. (2013). "Fotheringhay Church, Northamptonshire: Architecture and Fittings". In Kleineke, H.; Steer, C. (eds.). The Yorkist Age: Proceedings of the 2011 Harlaxton Symposium. Harlaxton Medieval Studies XXIII (New Series). Donnington: Shaun Tyas. pp. 367–379. ISBN 978-1-90773-0-221.
- Scattergood, V. J. (1971). Politics and Poetry in the Fifteenth Century, 1399–1485. London: Blandford. ISBN 978-0-71373-628-1.
- Scofield, C. L. (1923). The Life and Reign of Edward the Fourth, King of England and France and Lord of Ireland. London: Longmans, Green. OCLC 906125952.
- Seward, D. (2003). The Hundred Years War: The English in France 1337–1453 (repr. ed.). London: Penguin. ISBN 978-1-10117-377-0.
- Sinclair, A. F. J. (1986). The Beauchamp Earls of Warwick in the Later Middle Ages (PhD thesis). University of London. OCLC 53667701.
- Storey, R. L. (1957). "The Wardens of the Marches of England Towards Scotland, 1377–1489". English Historical Review. 72: 593–615. doi:10.1093/ehr/LXXII.CCLXXXV.593. OCLC 818916436.
- Storey, R. L. (1972). "The North of England". In Chrimes, S. B.; Ross, C. D.; Griffiths, R. A. (eds.). Fifteenth-Century England, 1399–1509: Studies in Politics and Society. Manchester: Manchester University Press. pp. 129–145. ISBN 978-0-06491-126-9.
- Storey, R. L. (1999). The End of the House of Lancaster (2nd ed.). Stroud: Sutton. ISBN 978-0-75092-199-2.
- Talbot, H. (1981). The English Achilles: An Account of the Life and Campaigns of John Talbot, 1st Earl of Shrewsbury, 1383–1453. London: Chatto and Windus. ISBN 978-0-70112-574-5.
- Thomson, J. A. F. (1983). The Transformation of Medieval England 1370–1529. London: Longman. ISBN 978-0-58248-976-9.
- Tuck, A. (1999). Crown and Nobility: England 1272–1461. Oxford: Wiley. ISBN 978-0-63121-466-3.
- Tuck, A. (2004). "Neville, Ralph, First Earl of Westmorland (c.1364–1425)". doi:10.1093/ref:odnb/19951. Archived from the original on 10 April 2026.
- Warner, M. W. (1991). The Montagu Earls of Salisbury c.1300–1428: A Study in Warfare, Politics, and Political Culture (PhD thesis). University of London. OCLC 1124138253.
- Watts, J. (2004). "Beauchamp, John, First Baron Beauchamp of Powick". Oxford. doi:10.1093/ref:odnb/50238. ISBN 978-0-19-861412-8. Archived from the original on 10 April 2026.
- Weiss, M. (1976). "A Power in the North: The Percies in the Fifteenth Century". Historical Journal. 19 (2): 501–509. doi:10.1017/S0018246X00010268. OCLC 863011771. S2CID 159692696.
- Wilkinson, B. (1969). The Later Middle Ages in England 1216–1485. Harlow: Longman. OCLC 930487644.
- Wolffe, B. P. (2001). Henry VI. Yale Monarchs (repr. ed.). London: Yale University Press. ISBN 978-0-30008-926-4.

Political offices
Preceded by John Kemp	Lord Chancellor; 1454–1455	Succeeded by Thomas Bourchier
Peerage of England
Preceded by Thomas Montacute; Restored in 1421	Earl of Salisbury (jure uxoris by Alice Montacute); 1428–1460	Succeeded by Richard Neville
