= 1500s (decade) =

Decade

The 1500s ran from January 1, 1500, to December 31, 1509.

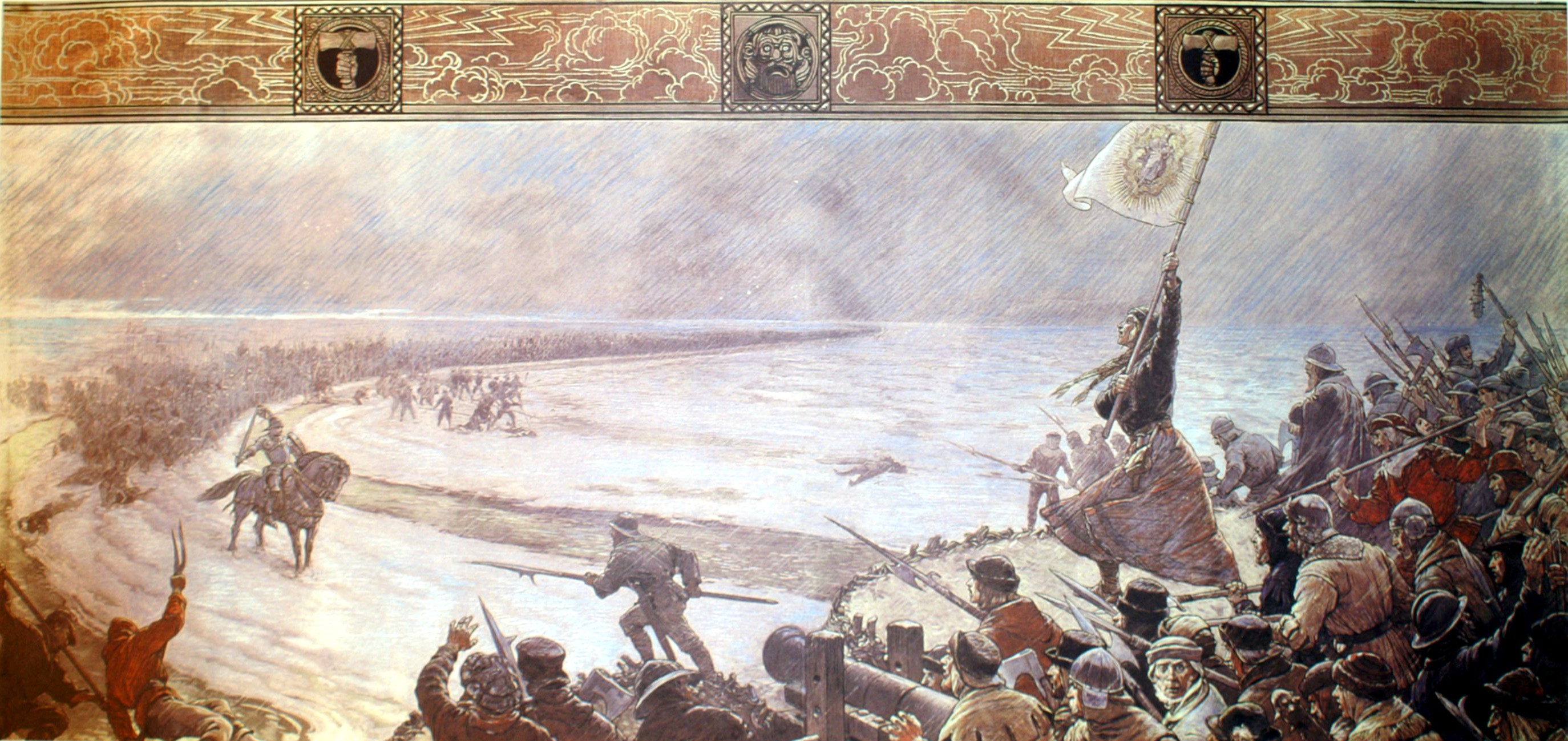
February 17, 1500: Battle of Hemmingstedt

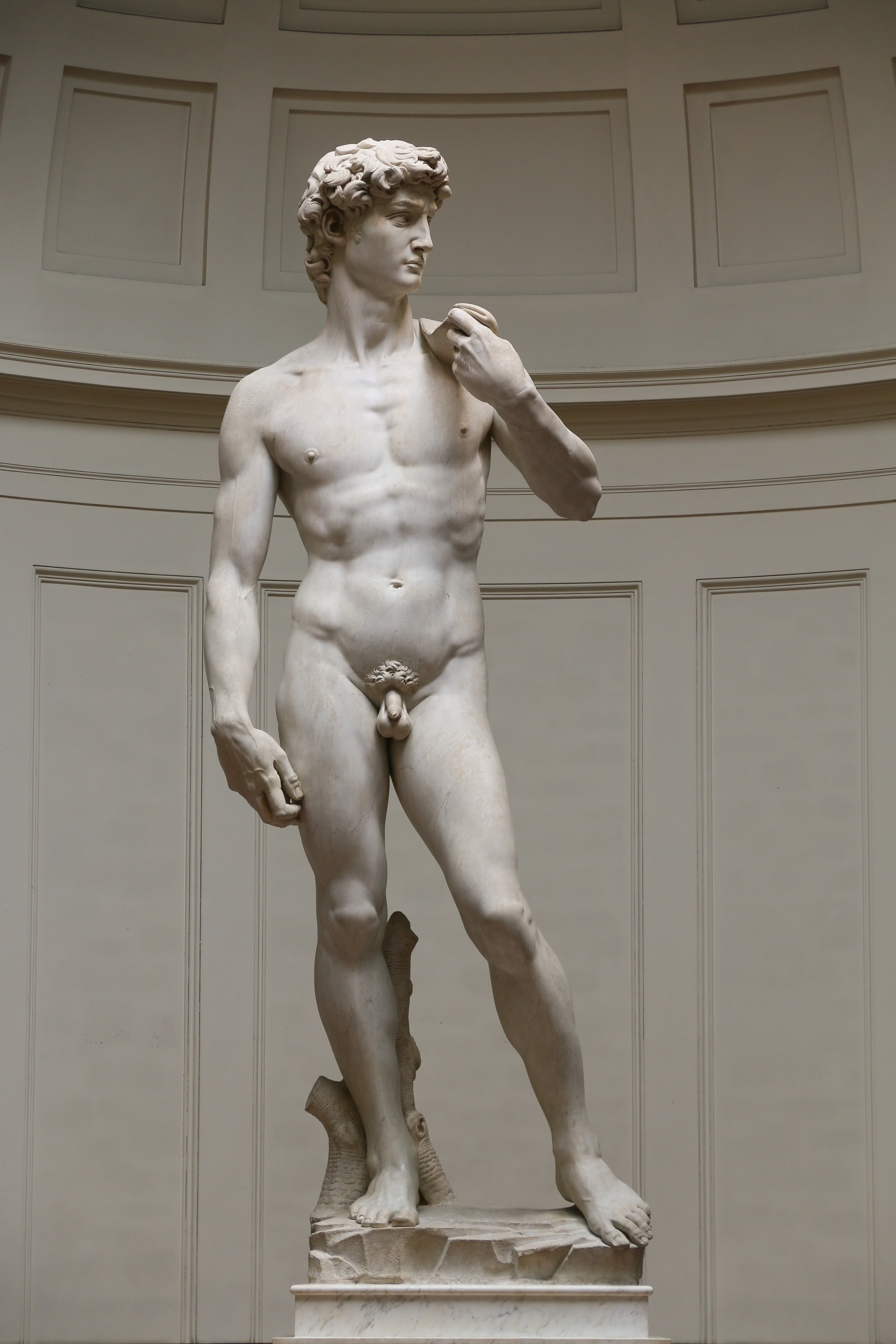
September 8, 1504: Michelangelo's David is completed.

== Events ==
=== January–March ===
- January 5 – Duke Ludovico Sforza recaptures Milan, but is soon driven out again by the French.
- January 26 – Spanish navigator Vicente Yáñez Pinzón reaches the northern coast of Brazil.
- February 5 – Ludovico Sforza's Swiss mercenary army retakes the city of Milan from the French during the Second Italian War.
- February 17 – Battle of Hemmingstedt: The Danish army fails to conquer the peasants' republic of Dithmarschen.
- March 9 – Pedro Álvares Cabral, with a fleet of 13 ships, departs Portugal on a voyage to the New World.
- March 11 – The Parliament of Bohemia adopts a new constitution that limits the power of King Vladislav II and subsequent Bohemian monarchs.
- March 24 – The day after departing the Cape Verde Islands with the rest of Cabral's fleet, Vasco de Ataíde and his 150 crewmates die when their ship goes down in a storm.

=== April–June ===
- April 22 – Portuguese navigator Pedro Álvares Cabral and his crew on 13 vessels arrive in Brazil, anchoring at Monte Pascoal and naming the country Vera Cruz. Cabral claims the land for the Kingdom of Portugal.
- May 1 – Pero Vaz de Caminha finishes writing his chronicle of the Portuguese discovery of Brazil while accompanying Cabral.
- May 3 – Cabral and his fleet depart from Brazil and sail eastward toward Africa, resuming their journey to India.
- May 5 – Representatives of the English and Spanish royal families sign a treaty at Canterbury for the marriage of 13-year-old Arthur, Prince of Wales (son of King Henry VII and Elizabeth of York) to 14-year-old Princess Catherine of Aragon. Arthur's marriage to Catherine takes place the next year, but Arthur dies five months later; she marries Arthur's younger brother Henry VIII in 1509.
- May 8 – The first guide to distilling of liquor is published, Liber de arte distillandi de simplicibus by Hieronymus Brunschwig.
- May 29 – Traveling eastward from Brazil, Cabral and his fleet run into a storm off of the coast of Africa near the Cape of Good Hope and lose four of their 13 ships. Navigator Bartolomeu Dias is among the persons killed.
- June 1 – Pope Alexander VI issues the papal bull Quamvis ad amplianda, calling on a Roman Catholic crusade against the Ottoman Empire.
- June 29 – A combined force of troops from the Kingdom of France and from the Republic of Florence lay siege to the city of Pisa.
- June 30 – Sultan Abu Sa'id Qansuh of Egypt is overthrown and sent into exile. Al-Ashraf Abu al-Nasir Janbalat is crowned as the new Mamluk sultan, but reigns for less than six months.

=== July–September ===
- July 14 – The Muscovites defeat the Lithuanians and the Poles in the Battle of Vedrosha.
- July 24 – Ottoman–Venetian War: The Turkish fleet of Kemal Reis defeats the Venetians in the Second Battle of Lepanto.
- August 9 – The Ottoman Empire defeats the Venetians and capture Modon and Coron, the "two eyes of the Republic".
- August 10 – Diogo Dias discovers an island which he names São Lourenço, since August 10 is the feast day of Saint Lawrence, a Roman Catholic martyr of the 3rd century. The massive island is later known as Madagascar.
- August 23 – Francisco de Bobadilla, appointed to replace Admiral Christopher Columbus as Spanish Governor-General of the New World, arrives at Santo Domingo on the island of Hispanola. Bobadilla issues an order directing Christopher and Bartolomeo Columbus to appear before him at Santo Domingo.
- September 12 – George the Bearded begins a reign of more than 38 years as Duke of Saxony at the Saxon capital of Emden, after the death of his father, Albert III, who had ruled 36 years. George also becomes George II, Margrave of Meissen.
- September 13 – Pedro Cabral's fleet of nine ships arrives in India, more than six months after departing from Portugal, and lands at the port of Calicut, which had been visited two years earlier by Vasco da Gama.

Christopher Columbus arrested

- September 15 – Christopher Columbus (Cristobal Colon) is placed under arrest, along with his two brothers, Bartolome and Diego, after appearing before Francisco de Bobadilla, who had replaced him as the Spanish Governor of the New World. ("El 15 de septiemre Bobadilla presenta sus credenciales a Colon... Colon habia ejectuado a varios espanoles cargo de gran peso contra el, asi que al fin Bobadilla resolvio enviarlos presos a Espana para que alla se les juzgase."— "On the 15th of September of 1500, Bobadilla presented his credential to Columbus. Columbus had executed several Spaniards charged with great weight against him, so Bobadilla finally decided to send them prisoners to Spain so that they could be tried there.")
- September 23 – Bobadilla hears testimony from 22 witnesses and concludes that the Columbus brothers intended to overthrow him; he has them placed in manacles and chains for deportation to Spain. ("La pesquisa de Bobadilla contra Colon habia comenzado el 23-IX-1500."— "Bobadilla's investigation against Colon had begun on 23 September 1500.")

=== October–December ===
- October 1 – Christopher Columbus and his brothers, arrested and in chains, are deported from Santo Domingo to Spain.
- October 22 – Nasir-ud-Din Shah overthrows the government of his father, Ghiyath Shah, ruler of the Malwa Sultanate (located in much of what is now the Indian state of Madhya Pradesh) for the last 31 years. Upon becoming the new Sultan, Nasir has his brother Ala-ud-Din executed, along with Ala-ud-din's children. Ghiyasuddin is poisoned the following February.
- November 11 – Treaty of Granada: Louis XII of France and Ferdinand II of Aragon agree to divide the Kingdom of Naples between them.
- November 16 – Emperor Go-Kashiwabara accedes to the throne of Meiō era Japan.
- November 25 – Christopher Columbus and his brothers arrive in Spain at Seville "after one of the longest Atlantic crossings in the Columbian years" (six weeks) and released on their own recognizance.
- December 17 – All charges against the Columbus brothers for malfeasance in governing Hispanola are dismissed by King Ferdinand and Queen Isabella.
- December 24 – The Siege of the Castle of St. George ends, and the island of Cephalonia is captured by a joint Venetian–Spanish fleet.
- December 31 – The last incunable is printed in Venice.

=== Date unknown ===
- Europe's population is estimated at 56.7 million people. The world's population is estimated to be between 425 million and 540 million.
- Saxony's mint at Annaberg begins producing guldengroschens, also known as guldiners.
- Although other reports exist, it is thought that the last wolf in England is killed this year, making the species extinct in that country. The wolf is thought to have been killed in Allithwaite, in Cumbria. However, reports of wolf sightings and laws concerning wolf bounties exist in rural areas of the north until the 18th century.
- A group of Māori migrate east from the New Zealand mainland to the Chatham Islands, developing a distinct pacificist culture known as the Moriori (approx. date).

=== January–March ===
- January 17 – Cesar Borgia returns triumphantly to Rome, from Romagna.
- February 1 – The Duchy of Bavaria-Dachau, created in Germany in 1467 after Sigismund, Duke of Bavaria was granted his own state following his resignation from the throne of the Duchy of Bavaria-Munich, reverts to Bavaria-Munich's control upon Sigismund's death.
- March 4 – Minkhaung II becomes the sole King of Burma upon the death of his son Thihathura II, with whom he was co-ruler for 15 years. Minkhaung's reign ends five weeks later when he dies on April 7.
- March 25 – Portuguese navigator João da Nova discovers Ascension Island. It is definitely sighted and named on May 20, 1503 (Feast of the Ascension) by Afonso de Albuquerque.

=== April–June ===
- April 7 – Shwenankyawshin Narapati begins an almost 26-year reign as King of Burma upon the death of his father, King Minkhaung II.
- April 11 – The Rebellion in the Alpujarras ends in southern Spain with a treaty of surrender of the last Muslim insurgents in the Alpujarra Mountains in Andalusia on the Mediterranean Sea. The Muslims are given the choice of expulsion or conversion to Christianity.
- May 10 – The formal coronation of King Shwenankyawshin of Burma takes place at his capital in Inwa in the Mandalay Region on the 9th waning of Kason, 863 ME.
- May 13 – The Venetian Republic signs a treaty with the Kingdom of Hungary and Pope Alexander VI for troops to protect Venetian Dalmatia during the Ottoman–Venetian War (1499–1503).
- May 15 – Harmonice Musices Odhecaton, the first printed collection of polyphonic music, is published by Ottaviano Petrucci in Venice.
- June 9 – The semi-independent city of Basel joins the Swiss Confederation as the eleventh canton of Switzerland.
- June 17 – Alexander Jagiellon, Grand Duke of Lithuania since 1492, becomes the new King of Poland upon the sudden death of his older brother, Jan I Olbracht.
- June 23 – Nicolau Coelho, part of Pedro Cabral's Portuguese expedition to India, returns home with one ship, having left ahead of Cabral.
- June 24 – Cesare Borgia's French troops storm and overtake the fortress at Capua in the Kingdom of Naples, overcoming the defense of Fabrizio Colonna in the occupation of the Spanish Kingdom of Aragon in southern Italy.

=== July–September ===
- July 21 – Portuguese explorer Pedro Álvares Cabral and his surviving crew return to Lisbon at the end of a 15-month expedition to India, with only seven of their original fleet of 13 ships. The cargo from India, however, returns a profit to the Portuguese crown of nine times its investment.
- July 25 – The Kingdom of Naples, led by King Federico I, surrenders to Cesare Borgia's French and Aragonese troops.
- July 27 – Copernicus is formally installed as canon of Frauenberg Cathedral.
- August 1 – Hans, King of Denmark, Norway and Sweden is deposed from the Swedish throne after fleeing the country following the victory of Swedish rebels at Örebro during the War of Deposition against King Hans. His wife, Christina of Saxony, is left behind at Stockholm as his regent of Sweden, to command a royal garrison at Tre Kronor ("Three Crowns"), the royal castle. Returning to Denmark, King Hans then organizes Danish troops to attempt to retake Sweden in the Dano-Swedish War (1501–1512).
- August 2 – King Federico of Naples abdicates upon the conquest of the Kingdom of Naples by France, and France's King Louis XII becomes the nominal monarch as Luigi II, re di Napoli. King Louis appoints Louis d'Armagnac, Duke of Nemours as France's Viceroy of Naples.
- August 27 – Battle of the Siritsa River: The Livonian Order, supporting the Grand Duchy of Lithuania in the Second Muscovite–Lithuanian War, and commanded by Wolter von Plettenberg, defeats an army of the Grand Duchy of Moscow and Pskov Republic.
- September 3 – On complaints from Christopher Columbus, who had been replaced as Viceroy of the New World and arrested in 1500 by Francisco de Bobadilla, Queen Isabella of Spain orders that Bobadilla be recalled from Santo Domingo. Declining to allow Columbus to resume his brutal rule of the New World, the Queen appoints a friend, Nicolás de Ovando, as the new Viceroy. Although Bobadilla receives news of his firing several weeks later, he declines to step aside. Ovando will assemble a fleet of 30 ships and depart Spain on February 13 for Santo Domingo.
- September 12 – Maximilian I, Archduke of Austria, issues a decree making firearms safety tests mandatory.
- September 18 – Aleksandras Jogailaitis, Grand Duke of Lithuania, issues a decree requiring all Roman Catholic priests in the Duchy to become fluent in the Lithuanian language.
- September 27 – Queen Isabella orders New World Governor Bobadilla to return the assets confiscated from Christopher Columbus and the two other Columbus brothers.

=== October–December ===
- October 2
  - Leonardo Loredan is elected 75th doge of the Venetian Republic, taking office on October 13, and serves for almost 20 years.
  - Spanish princess Catherine of Aragon arrives in England and arrives at Plymouth. Although she will later become the wife of King Henry VIII in 1509, she initially arrives to marry Henry's older brother, Arthur, Prince of Wales.
- October 13 – Maximilian of Austria and Louis XII of France sign the Treaty of Trente with Austria recognizing all French conquests in the northern territories of Italy.
- October 30 – The Banquet of Chestnuts is purportedly held by Cesare Borgia, in the Papal Palace of Rome (this account is not historical fact, and could be attributed to enemies of Alexander VI).
- November 1 (All Saints) – Amerigo Vespucci discovers and names Baía de Todos os Santos, in Brazil.
- November 4
  - Second Muscovite–Lithuanian War: At the Battle of Mstislavl, Grand Prince Ivan's Southern Muscovite army defeats the forces of the Grand Duchy of Lithuania.
  - Philip and Joanna of Castile leave for Spain.
- November 12 – Sten Sture the Elder is elected Regent of Sweden for the second time, becoming the Scandinavian nation's chief executive after King Hans of Denmark is deposed. No replacement of the monarchy is planned by the rebel Swedish nobles.
- November 14 – Arthur, Prince of Wales, marries the Spanish princess Catherine of Aragon.
- November 24 – A large army of the Grand Duchy of Moscow overruns Livonia during the Second Muscovite–Lithuanian War.
- December 12 – Grand Duke Aleksandras Jogailaitis, Grand Duke of Lithuania becomes the King of Poland as Aleksander I Jagiellończyk.
- December 22 – (1 Jumada al-Thani 907 AH) Ismail I is enthroned as the first Shah of Iran, choosing Tabriz as his capital, founding the Safavid dynasty in northern Iran. He declares Shi'ism the official and compulsory religion, under penalty of death.
- December 31 – First Battle of Cannanore: João da Nova fleet engaged the fleet of the Zamorin in a battle outside of the Cannanore harbor, the first Portuguese naval battle in the Indian Ocean.

=== Date unknown ===
- The Swiss cantons of Basel and Schaffhausen join the Old Swiss Confederacy.
- Gaspar Corte-Real, Portuguese navigator, makes the first documented European landing in North America since c. 1000 A.D.
- Rodrigo de Bastidas, sailing westward from Venezuela in search of gold, becomes the first European to explore the Isthmus of Panama.
- Amerigo Vespucci maps the two stars Alpha Centauri and Beta Centauri, as well as the stars of the constellation Crux, which are below the horizon in Europe.
- Dhaulpur is taken by Sikandar Lodi.
- Michelangelo returns to his native Florence, to begin work on the statue David.
- Italic type (cut by Francesco Griffo) is first used by Aldus Manutius at the Aldine Press in Venice, in an edition of Virgil.
- Martin Luther enters the University of Erfurt.

=== January–March ===
- January 1 – Portuguese explorers, led by Gonçalo Coelho, sail into Guanabara Bay, Brazil, mistaking it for the mouth of a river, which they name Rio de Janeiro.
- January 24 – Commissioners from Scotland and England meet at Richmond Palace in London to finalize an agreement on the marriage between Scotland's King James IV to the daughter of England's King Henry VII, the princess Margaret Tudor, with a dowry of 35,000 Scottish Punnds and an agreement for a "treaty of perpetual peace". The marriage will be completed by proxy on January 25, 1503.
- February 12 – Isabella I issues an edict outlawing Islam in the Crown of Castile, forcing virtually all her Muslim subjects to convert to Christianity.
- February 13 – The new Viceroy of the New World, Nicolás de Ovando, departs Spain with a fleet of 30 ships and orders to replace Viceroy Francisco de Bobadilla at Santo Domingo on the island of Hispaniola, and arrives in April.
- March 14 – Christopher Columbus begins preparation for his fourth and final voyage, with a goal of finding a westward passage in the New World to link the Atlantic Ocean to the Indian Ocean.
- March 26 – The first recorded earthquake in what is now Croatia strikes at Medvednica with a Mercalli scale intensity estimated at VIII. (2000).

=== April–June ===
- April 2 – Arthur, Prince of Wales, the 15-year-old Duke of Cornwall and Earl of Chester, heir to the English throne as eldest son of King Henry VII, dies after a long illness less than five months after marrying Catherine of Aragon. Arthur's 10-year-old brother, Henry, Duke of York, becomes the new heir to the throne and will later succeed his father as King Henry VIII.
- April 11 – Dmitry Ivanovich Vnuk, who had been the teenage co-ruler of the Grand Duchy of Moscow since 1498 with his grandfather Ivan III, is arrested along with his mother, Elena of Moldavia on suspicion of conspiracy. Ivan designates his son (and Dmitry's uncle) Vasili Ivanovich as the new heir to the throne of Moscow.
- April 14 – The formal coronation of Ivan the Great as Grand Prince of Moscow (encompassing most of the Russian people's territory) to reflect that he is the nation's sole ruler. Ivan had been co-ruler of Moscow from 1449 to 1462, ruler from 1462 to 1471 and 1490 to 1498, and co-ruler with his eldest son (Ivan the Young, 1471-1490) and his grandson, Dmitry Ivanovich from 1498 onward.
- May 3 – Portuguese navigator João da Nova discovers the uninhabited island of Saint Helena.
- May 9 – Christopher Columbus leaves Cadiz in Spain for his fourth and final trip to the New World, taking with him 147 men on his flagship, Capitana and the companion ships Gallega, Vizcaína, and Santiago de Palos. He explores Central America, and discovers the Isthmus of Panama and the land now occupied by Honduras, and Costa Rica, and possibly the island of St. Lucia as well
- May 26 – Columbus and his men complete the rescue of stranded Portuguese soldiers in Morocco, then depart Asilah for a crossing of the Atlantic in 20 days.
- June 15 – Columbus and his crew land on the island of Martinique and land at Le Carbet.
- June 29 – Columbus and his crew attempt to land at Santo Domingo in order to avoid being caught in a hurricane, despite being ordered not to return to Hispaniola. Nicolás de Ovando, the Spanish Viceroy, refuses to let Columbus sail into harbor and does not believe the warnings of the hurricane, which strikes two days later.

=== July–September ===
- July 1 – A powerful hurricane sweeps through the Caribbean Sea near Puerto Rico and the island of Hispaniola, two days after Christopher Columbus was denied permission to land at Santo Domingo. An estimated 500 people are killed when the winds wreck 20 of the 31 ships brought from Spain by the new Viceroy, Nicolás de Ovando, including Ovando's flagship, El Dorado. Former Viceroy Francisco de Bobadilla and administrator Francisco Roldán are among the people killed. A ship provided by Bobadilla for Columbus to transport the gold owed to him, the Aguja, is one of the 11 to survive the hurricane and accusations are made that Columbus magically invoked the storm as an act of vengeance.
- July 28 – At Augsburg, Maximilian I, Germany's King of the Romans signs a treaty with representatives of King Henry VII of England, agreeing not to provide assistance to English rebels.
- July 30 – The first encounter between Europeans and the Maya people of Central America takes place when the Columbus brothers anchor at Guanaja, one of the Bay Islands off of the coast of what is now the nation of Honduras. An unfortunate group of Mayan traders happens to arrive at Guanaja at the same time, and its cargo is looted by Bartolomeo Columbus and his crew.
- August 14 – Christopher Columbus and his crew land at Puerto Castilla in what is now the mainland of the nation of Honduras, becoming the first Europeans to visit.
- September 18 – Christopher Columbus lands at Central America at what is now Costa Rica.
- September 29 – Anne of Foix-Candale is proclaimed Queen of Hungary upon her marriage to Vladislaus II, King of Hungary and Bohemia, at a ceremony in Székesfehérvár.

=== October–December ===
- October 1 – An annular solar eclipse occurs.
- October 16 – Columbus and his crew arrive at Almirante Bay in Panama.
- November 7 – Ismail I founds the Safavid dynasty and proclaims himself the Shah of Iran after defeating tribes of the Aq Qoyunlu confederation.
- November 19 – The "Cantino planisphere", a precise copy for an Italian spy of Portugal's secret Padrão Real map of the New World, is acquired by Alberto Cantino, agent for Ercole I d'Este, Duke of Ferrara, at a cost of 12 golden ducats.
- December 26 – Cesare Borgia kills Ramiro d'Orco; this incident is referenced in Machiavelli's The Prince
- December 31 – Cesare Borgia (son of Pope Alexander VI) occupies Urbino, where he imprisons two potentially treacherous allies, Vitellozzo and Oliveretto; he executes them the next morning.

=== Date unknown ===
- The first African slaves brought to the New World arrive at the island of Hispaniola (modern-day Haiti and Dominican Republic).
- Bristol merchants return from Newfoundland (first so named this year from a letter) to England, carrying three native people and cod from the Grand Banks.
- Moctezuma II is elected emperor of the Aztecs, following the death of Ahuitzotl.
- Meñli I Giray defeats the Golden Horde and sacks their capital, Sarai.
- Wittenberg University is founded.
- In Germany, Peter Henlein of Nuremberg uses iron parts and coiled springs to build a portable timepiece.
- In Italy, Asher Lämmlein declares that the Jewish Messiah will arrive in the next 6 months, resulting in the year of penance.
- The King's School, Macclesfield, England, is founded by Sir John Percyvale.
- Heinrich Cornelius Agrippa receives the degree of magister artium from the University of Cologne.
- Wilhelm Bombast moves to Villach with his son, Paracelsus.

=== January–March ===
- January 20 – Seville in Castile is awarded exclusive rights to trade with the New World.
- January 24 – Construction of the Henry VII Chapel at Westminster Abbey begins in the perpendicular Gothic style, the final stage of English Gothic art.
- February 13 – Challenge of Barletta: Thirteen Italian knights defeat thirteen French knights, near Barletta.
- February 23 – Third Italian War: Battle of Ruvo – The Spanish defeat the French in Italy.
- March 15 – Portuguese explorer Vasco da Gama and sailors of his Portuguese India Armada become the first Europeans to sight the Seychelles islands as Thomé Lopes notes the discovery of what will later be called Silhouette Island.

=== April–June ===
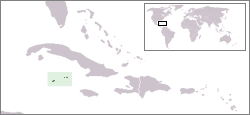
May 10: Columbus at Cayman Islands

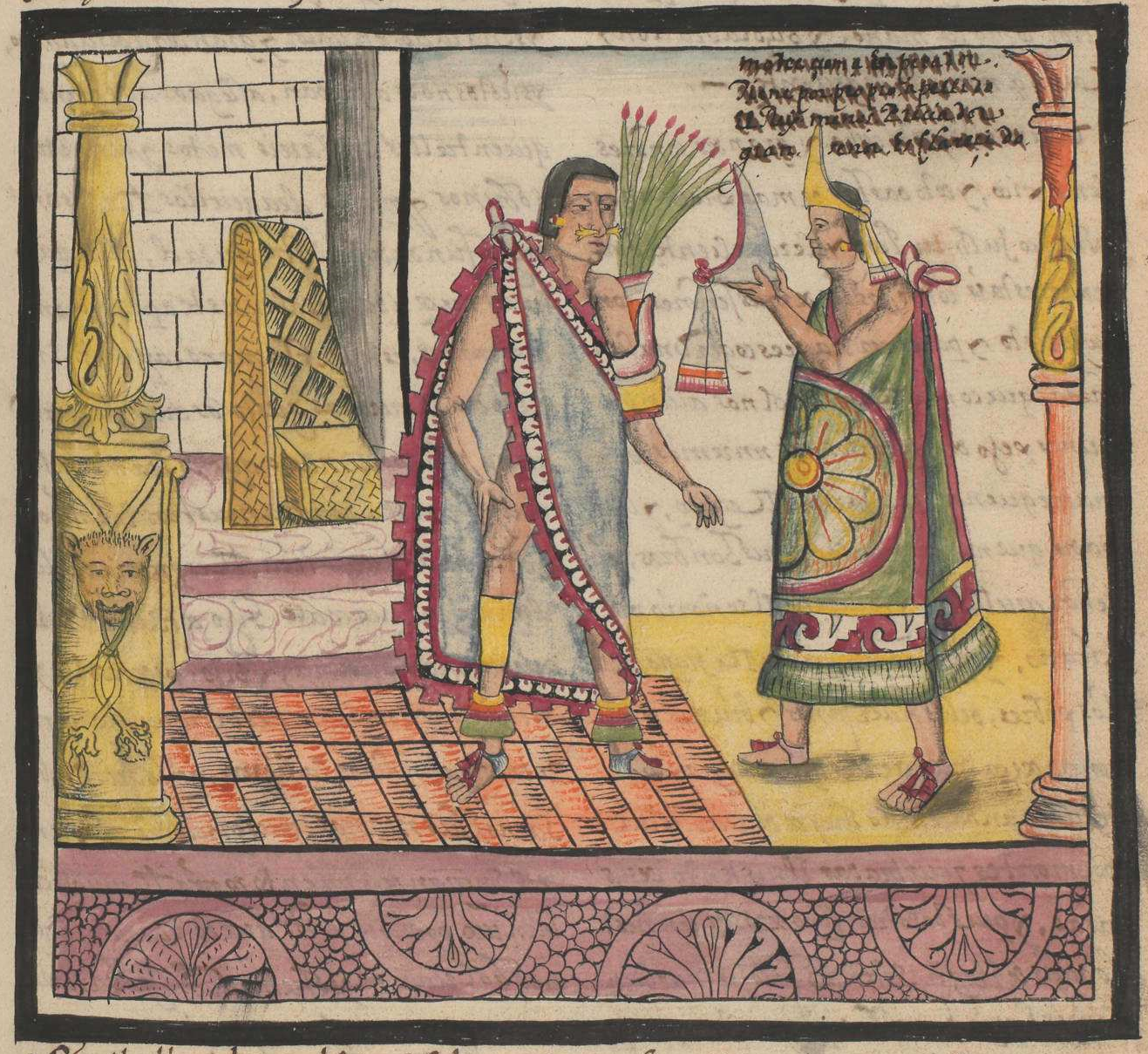
May 24: Coronation of Moctezuma II as Aztec Emperor takes place in Tenochtitlan

- April 2 – The Kingdom of Cochin (ruled by a Portuguese-installed raja, Unni Ramman Koyil II in modern-day India's Kerala state) is invaded by 50,000 Nair troops of the Zamorin of Calicut.
- April 21 – Third Italian War: Battle of Seminara – Spanish forces under Fernando de Andrade de las Mariñas defeat the French under Bernard Stewart, 4th Lord of Aubigny, who is captured, in Calabria.
- April 28 – Third Italian War: Battle of Cerignola – Spanish forces under Gonzalo Fernández de Córdoba defeat the French under Louis d'Armagnac, Duke of Nemours, who is killed, in Apulia. This is considered to be the first battle in history won by gunpowder small arms.
- May 10 – Christopher Columbus discovers the Cayman Islands, which he names Las Tortugas, after the numerous sea turtles there.
- May 13 – Naples is captured by the Spanish.
- May 20 (Feast of the Ascension) – Ascension Island is first definitively sighted, by Portuguese admiral Afonso de Albuquerque.
- May 24 – The coronation of Moctezuma II as ruler of the Aztec Empire takes place at the Aztec capital of Tenochtitlan, part of modern-day Mexico City.
- May 28 – James IV of Scotland and Margaret Tudor of England are married as per the Treaty of Perpetual Peace by Pope Alexander VI, according to Papal bull.
- June 21 – Murad, the last Sultan of Aq Qoyunlu in modern-day eastern Turkey fights the Safavid King of Persia, Ismail I in a battle near the city of Hamadan, and suffers 10,000 casualties, including his commander Güzel Ahmad.
- June 23 – Representatives of King Henry VII of England and Queen Isabella of Spain sign a treaty for 12-year-old Henry, Prince of Wales to be married to Catherine of Aragon, widow of King Henry's son Arthur.
- June 25 – After his ships are damaged in a storm, Christopher Columbus and his 230 men are forced to beach at the island of Jamaica (at modern-day Saint Ann Parish) and remain stranded there for the next six months.
- June 27 – The book The Imitation of Christ by Thomas à Kempis is re-published in an English translation.

=== July–September ===
- July 23 – Orbital calculations suggest that on this day Pluto moves outside Neptune's orbit, remaining there for 233 years.
- July 30 – Saint Helena is first definitively sighted, by ships of Portuguese navigator Estêvão da Gama returning from the East.
- August 8 – King James IV of Scotland marries Margaret Tudor, daughter of King Henry VII of England, at Holyrood Abbey, Edinburgh, Scotland.
- August 18 – Pope Alexander VI dies after a reign of 11 years, and the largest gathering of cardinals up to that time— 21 from Italy, 11 from Spain and 7 from France— is called to Rome for a papal conclave, to start in September.
- August 20 – A previous treaty between Vladislaus II of Hungary and Bayezid II, which was finalized on June 11, goes into effect. The treaty suppresses warfare along the Hungarian-Ottoman border. Stephen III of Moldavia is also included in this treaty, but it preserves his nation's independence on the condition Moldavia pays an annual tribute to the Ottoman Empire.
- September 22 – Francesco Todeschini Piccolomini, Archbishop of Siena, is elected as the new Pope after the voting cardinals cannot decide between Georges d'Amboise of France or Giuliano della Rovere of Italy. Piccolomini takes the name of Pope Pius III but will reign for only 26 days.

=== October–December ===
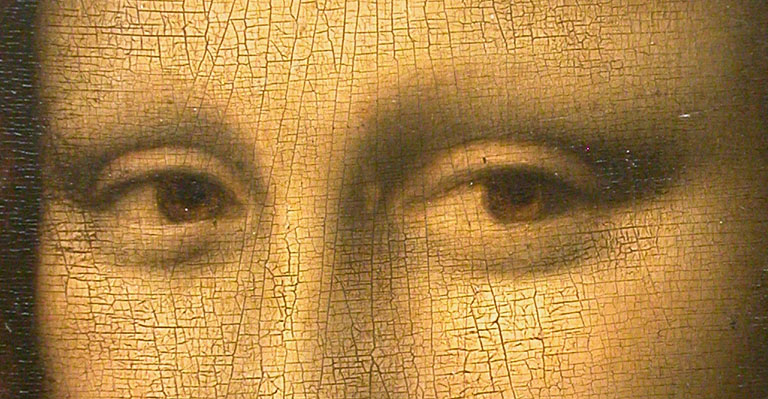
By October: Work on Mona Lisa has begun

- October – Earliest record of Leonardo da Vinci working on a portrait of Lisa del Giocondo, probably the Mona Lisa, in Florence.
- October 1 – Fort Emmanuel is christened at Cochin after Afonso de Albuquerque obtained permission to be able to build it. It is the first European fort in India, in addition to being the first Portuguese fort.
- October 18 – Pope Pius III dies less than four weeks after being elected, prompting the calling of the second papal conclave in as many months.
- October 30 – Queen Isabella I of Spain issues an edict prohibiting violence against indigenous peoples in the New World.
- November 1 – Cardinal Giuliano della Rovere, Bishop of Ostia, is elected the 216th Roman Catholic Pontiff at the end of the year's second papal conclave and takes the papal name Pope Julius II. Della Rovere had received 15 of 32 votes in the September voting for a plurality, but still short of a majority. Julius II reigns for a little more than nine years until his death in 1513.
- November 11 – Bernard Stewart, 4th Lord of Aubigny, commander of the defeated French forces and a prisoner of war since his April 21 defeat at the Battle of Seminara, is released from Castel Nuovo in Naples after a truce between France and Spain.
- November 29 – Pope Julius II, formerly Giuliano della Rovere, adds four new people to the College of Cardinals, including two members of his family, Clemente della Rovere and Galeotto della Rovere. By the time of his death, Julius will have added 27 cardinals to the Roman Catholic Church, five of them from the della Rovere family.
- December 29 – Third Italian War: The Battle of Garigliano takes place near Gaeta in Italy. Spanish forces under Gonzalo Fernández de Córdoba defeat a French–Italian mercenary army under Marchese Ludovico II of Saluzzo; the French forces, who suffer 4,000 casualties, withdraw to Gaeta.

=== Date unknown ===
- Mariotto Albertinelli paints The Visitation.
- Hieronymus Bosch works on the triptych The Garden of Earthly Delights, although other sources suggest a 1490-1510 date range for when he worked on it.
- From this year until 1660, sixteen million kilograms of silver and 185,000 kilograms of gold will enter the port of Seville.
- The Spanish explorer Juan de Bermúdez discovered the island Bermuda.

=== January–March ===
- January 1 – French troops of King Louis XII surrender Gaeta to the Spanish, under Gonzalo Fernández de Córdoba.
- January 21 – After the death of Sten Sture the Elder on December 14 the year before, Svante Nilsson is elected the new Regent of Sweden.
- January 31 – Treaty of Lyon: France cedes Naples to Ferdinand II of Aragon, who becomes King of Naples as Ferdinand III.
- February 14 – King Ferdinand V of Castile contracts with Juan de la Cosa to finance an independent expedition to the Pearl Islands and the Gulf of Urabá.
- February 18 – The investiture of Prince Henry of England as Prince of Wales and Earl of Chester takes place.
- February 29 – Christopher Columbus uses his knowledge of a lunar eclipse this night, to convince the indigenous Jamaican people to provide him with supplies (in Europe, the eclipse is in the early morning of March 1).
- March 11 – King James IV opens the Scottish Parliament for the first time since 1496.
- March 16 – In what is now India's Kerala state, a second invasion of the Portuguese-supported Kingdom of Cochin by the Zamorin of Calicut takes place, beginning a war that lasts until July 3.
- March 30 – The Eisho era begins in Japan during the reign of Emperor Go-Kashiwabara as the Bunki era ends.

=== April–June ===
- April 1 – Guilds in England become subject to state control.
- April 23 – Maximilian I, Holy Roman Emperor grants the Landshut inheritance to Albert IV during the War of the Succession of Landshut. Maximilian would pronounce an imperial ban on Ruprecht on May 4, whom Albert contested for the territory.
- May 24 – Le Hien Tong, Emperor of Vietnam, dies after a reign of six years and is succeeded by his 15-year-old son Le Tuc Tong.
- June 17 – Rao Bika Rathore, ruler of the Kingdom of Bikaner in India, dies after a reign of 32 years. For a brief time Bika is succeeded by his elder son Nara, but Nara quickly dies and Nara is succeeded by his brother Lunkaran.
- June 28 – After being marooned in Jamaica for six months, Christopher Columbus and his men are rescued by a Spanish ship.

=== July–September ===
- July 2 – Bogdan III the One-Eyed becomes the new Prince of Moldavia upon the death of his father Stephen the Great.
- July 3 – The siege of Cochin in India by the invading forces of Calicut ends as the Portuguese and Cochin defenders defeat the invaders. Calicut loses 5,000 dead in battle and another 13,000 to disease, while Cochin and Portugal sustain minimal losses.
- July 7 – At the age of 16, Lê Túc Tông becomes the new Emperor of Vietnam (Dai Viet) after the death of his father, Lê Hiến Tông, but serves for only six months before dying.
- July 20 – Pope Julius II issues an order reforming the official coinage of the Papal States, raising the silver content of the carlino coin to four grams. In that the Pope was formerly Giuliano della Rovere, the new coin is called the giulio in his honor and features the coat of arms of the della Rovere family.
- August 19 – The Battle of Knockdoe is fought in Ireland's County Galway as 6,000 troops led by the English Lord Deputy of Ireland, Gerald FitzGerald, 8th Earl of Kildare assist Maelsechlainn mac Tadhg Ó Cellaigh, King of Uí Mháine, against 4,000 troops of Irish chieftain Ulick Fionn Burke, Lord of the Clanricarde lands. Burke had previously attacked and destroyed Ó Cellaigh's castles at Monivea, Castleblakeney and Garbally and sought Kildare's help. Kildare's forces win the battle.
- September 8 – Michelangelo's sculpture of David is unveiled in Florence.
- September 13 – Queen Isabella and King Ferdinand issue a Royal Warrant for the construction of Capilla Real, a Royal Chapel, to be built in Granada.
- September 22 – Treaty of Blois: Philip the Handsome, Maximilian I, and Louis XII agree to terms.

=== October–December ===
- October 12 – Isabella I of Castile signs her will and testament.
- November 7 – Christopher Columbus returns to Spain from his fourth voyage, during which he and his younger son, Ferdinand, explored the coast of Central America from Belize to Panama.
- November 26 – On the death of Isabella I of Castile, Catholic Queen of Castile and Aragon, the Crown of Castile passes to her daughter Joanna.
- December 8
  - (approximate date) Islamic scholar Ahmad ibn Abi Jum'ah issues the Oran fatwa for Muslims in Spain (1 Rajab 910 AH in Islamic calendar, Gregorian date is approximate).
  - Lê Túc Tông dies after a reign of only six months as Emperor of Vietnam.
- December 24 – Nils Ravaldsson, the leader of the rebellion after Knut Alvsson's death, is attacked and his resistance crushed at Olsborg Castle in Båhuslen.

=== Date unknown ===
- October – Babur besieges and captures Kabul.
- Islamization of the Sudan region: A Funj leader, Amara Dunqas, founds the Sultanate of Sennar.
- Sheikh Ahmed, the final leader of the Great Horde, is last heard of as a Lithuanian prisoner at Vilnius until 1527 when he was released, after which he came to rule over the Astrakhan Khanate.
- In Florence, Leonardo da Vinci and Niccolò Machiavelli become involved in a scheme to divert the Arno River, cutting the water supply to Pisa to force its surrender: Colombino, the project foreman, fails to follow da Vinci's design, and the project is a major failure.
- The Council of Ten discusses the advisability of proposing a scheme of a Suez Canal to the Sultan of Egypt, at the time Al-Ashraf Qansuh al-Ghuri, but the discussion is eventually abandoned.
- Aldus Manutius publishes his edition of Demosthenes in Venice.
- The Signoria of Florence commissions both Leonardo da Vinci and Michelangelo to paint the walls of the Grand Council Chamber in the Palazzo Vecchio.
- Raphael paints The Marriage of the Virgin, which exemplifies some major principles of High Renaissance art.

=== January–March ===
- January 14 – Pope Julius II issues the papal bull Cum tam divino, decreeing a reform in the Roman Catholic Church to prohibit simony, the buying and selling of church offices ranging from bishops to the pope himself.
- January 23 – Lunkaran begins his reign as the Rao of the Indian kingdom of Bikaner in what is now the Rajasthan state of India.
- January 24 – Under the terms of the Treaty of Tordesillas, Pope Julius II sets the line of demarcation in the New World between Spain's and Portugal's territory as a line of longitude 370 leagues west of the Cape Verde islands. The ambiguous definition of the measure of a league places the line between 42°30' W to 49°45' W.
- February 7 – During a visit to Windsor Castle as guests of King Henry VII of England, Philip the Handsome, Duke of Burgundy, plays a game of tennis against Thomas Grey, 2nd Marquess of Dorset in the first recorded use of tennis rackets. A year later, a chronicler notes that on the 7th of February, "the kynge of Castelle played w the Rackete and gave the marques xv".
- March 25 – Appointed as the Viceroy of Portuguese India by King Manuel I of Portugal, Dom Francisco de Almeida departs from Portugal with an armada of 22 ships and 1,500 men, according to one estimate by João de Barros.
- March 31 – King Alexander Jagiellon of Poland agrees to support the Act of Nihil novi, prohibiting the king to issue laws without consent of the nobles represented by their parliament, the Sejm. The official title is "Nihil novi nisi commune consensu", Latin for "Nothing new without common consent."

=== April–June ===
- April 3 – Italian explorer Sebastiano Caboto is granted a lifetime annuity of £10 per year by England's King Henry VII for services "in and aboute the fyndynge of the new founde landes" in North America.
- April 27 – In Tbilisi, David X becomes the new ruler of the Kingdom of Kartli in what is now the Republic of Georgia, upon the death of his father Constantine II.
- May 1 – Christ's College, Cambridge, England, is re-founded, receiving its charter from Lady Margaret Beaufort.
- May 30 – Poland's Act of Nihil novi is granted by King Alexander I Jagiellon after being passed by the Sejm, making Poland a Nobles' Democracy rather than an absolute monarchy.
- June 6 – The M8.2–8.8 Lo Mustang earthquake strikes Nepal, causing severe damage in Kathmandu, western Nepal, and some parts of the Indo-Gangetic plain.
- June 19 – Zhu Houzhao, the 13-year-old son of the late Hongzhi Emperor of Ming Dynasty China, is enthroned as the Zhengde Emperor upon his father's death.
- June 27 – The future King Henry VIII repudiates his engagement to Catherine of Aragon, at his father's command.

=== July–September ===
- July 2
  - The Kalmar Bloodbath, a mass execution of participants in the Swedish Uprising against King Hans of Denmark (who also rules Norway and Sweden) takes place in the Swedish city of Kalmar after a judgment of treason is pronounced against the mayor, city officials and other leaders.
  - Martin Luther, aged 22, vows to become a monk in a moment of terror, as a result of a close lightning strike during a thunderstorm, near the village of Stotternheim.
- July 17 – Luther enters the monastic life, at an Augustinian cloister in Erfurt called St. Augustine's Monastery.
- July 24 – Travelling to India, a group of Portuguese explorers led by Francisco de Almeida, with 22 ships and 1,500 men, sack the city-state of Kilwa in East Africa, killing the Emir Abraham for failing to pay tribute. Almeida installs Mohammed Ankoni as the new ruler.
- August 15 – The Portuguese State of India is founded in what is now the state of Kerala, after the Kingdom of Portugal takes over territory of the Bijapur sultanate at Calicut.
- August 16 – Almeida's fleet destroys the East African city of Mombassa.
- September 13
  - Francisco de Almeida arrives in the Anjediva Islands to begin construction on the first of four fortresses he needed to construct for his appointment as viceroy.
  - In what is now Algeria, the Spanish Army under the command of Ramón de Cardona, captures the city of Mers-el-Kébir, a port of the Zayyanid Kingdom of Tlemcen, ruled by the Sultan Abu Abdallah V.

=== October–December ===
- October 11 – Lucien Grimaldi takes over as the new Lord of Monaco after stabbing his brother Jean II to death.
- October 23 – In Portuguese India, the King of Cannanore gives permission to Francisco de Almeida to build the Fortaleza de Santo Ângelo in Kannur.
- November 6 (October 27 O.S.) – Vasili III succeeds Ivan III, as Grand Prince of Muscovy, comprising much of modern-day Russia.
- November 15 – Portuguese explorer Lourenço de Almeida and his fleet encounter a storm and are driven to the island of Sri Lanka and travels to Colombo. The King of Kotte, Dharma Parakramabahu IX, allows Almeida to build a trade station and a Roman Catholic chapel.
- November 24 – The Treaty of Salamanca is signed by Spain's King Ferdinand II of Aragon and Philip, Duke of Burgundy, agreeing that the two will serve as co-regents for Joanna the Mad, Queen of Castile.
- December 30 – Érard de La Marck is elected prince-bishop of Liège.

=== Date unknown ===
- The Pomander Watch of 1505, the earliest known pocket watch, is made by Peter Henlein in Germany at Nuremberg. After an absence of 480 years, the watch will be rediscovered at a flea market in London; an inscription on the watch, "MDVPHN", will be interpreted in 2014 as meaning a rendition of the year (MDV, 1505 in Roman numerals); the inventor (PH for Peter Henlein) and the place of manufacture (N for Nuremberg).
- Portuguese merchants establish factories and fortresses on the east coast of Africa in Kilwa, Sofala, and Malindi.
- Bermuda is discovered by Spanish explorer Juan de Bermúdez.
- Judah Abravanel becomes personal physician to the viceroy of Naples.
- Battle of Achnashellach in Scotland: The Clan Cameron emerges victorious over Clan Munro and Clan MacKay.
- Portuguese explorer Gonçalo Álvares is the first to sight what will later be known as Gough Island in the South Atlantic.
- The St Catherine's Monastery on the Sinai is captured and sacked by Bedouins. Though the Mamluk sultan attempts to punish the raiders, he is unable to subdue them and preserve order.
- Old St. Peter's Basilica is demolished under the orders of Pope Julius II. Construction of the new basilica begins the following year.

=== January–March ===
- January 14 – The classical statue of Laocoön and His Sons is unearthed in Rome. On the recommendation of Giuliano da Sangallo and Michelangelo, Pope Julius II purchases it, and places it on public display in the Vatican a month later.
- January 22 – The Swiss Guard arrives at the Vatican, to serve as permanent ceremonial and palace guards under Pope Julius II.
- February 9 – Henry, Prince of Wales is made a Knight of the Golden Fleece by Maximilian I, Holy Roman Emperor.
- February 15 – Iye Roy Mackay, Chief of Scotland's Clan Mackay, records his 1504 grant of six lands in what is now the County Sutherland, and starts a feud with Euphemia II, Countess of Ross.
- March 16 – Battle of Cannanore: Portugal's fleet (commanded by Lourenço de Almeida) defeats the fleet of the Zamorin of Calicut, with hundreds of vessels involved; 3,000 Muslim troops are killed.
- March 30 – King Vladislaus II of Hungary and Maximilian I, Holy Roman Emperor sign a treaty to arrange the marriage of Vladislaus's daughter and Maximilian's son.

=== April–June ===
- April 18 – Pope Julius II lays the foundation stone of the new (current) St. Peter's Basilica in Rome, replacing the Old St. Peter's Basilica.
- April 19 – The Lisbon Massacre begins in Portugal with three days of violence, in which thousands of Jews are tortured and killed by Catholics.
- April 30 – Malus Intercursus, a treaty between King Henry VII of England and Duke Philip the Handsome of Burgundy, is signed.
- May 4 – Badi' al-Zaman Mirza becomes the new Emir of the Timurid Empire (now part of Afghanistan) after the death of his father, Sultan Husayn Bayqara, who died after a reign of 37 years.
- May 28 – Emperor Moctezuma II of Mexico's Aztec Empire subdues a rebellion in Zozollan, east of Achiutia, then kills the prisoners of war as a sacrifice to the gods.
- June 15 – Mahmud Shah II begins a 41-year reign as the Sultan of Kedah, a Muslim kingdom on the Malay Peninsula, on the death of his father, Adilin I.
- June 27 – The Treaty of Villafáfila is signed between Austria and Spain.

=== July–September ===
- July 12 – Philip the Handsome, Duke of Burgundy, becomes the ruler of the Spanish Kingdom of Castile with his insane wife Joanna, but reigns for only two months before dying of typhoid.
- August 6 – Battle of Kletsk: The Grand Duchy of Lithuania defeats the Tatars of the Crimean Khanate.
- August 19 – Sigismund I the Old succeeds his brother as king of Poland.
- September 2 – In Korea, Emperor Yonsangun, known for being a tyrant, is deposed in the Jungjong coup by his younger brother, who becomes King Jungjong.
- September 25 – Philip I, the first Spanish Habsburg King of Castile, dies suddenly from typhoid.

=== October–December ===
- October 6 – In Córdoba, in the Spanish kingdom of Andalusia, members of the nobility and the general public revolt against the Spanish inquisitor Diego Rodriguez de Lucero and General Inquisitor Diego de Deza. The mob liberates the people incarcerated at the Córdoba prison.
- October 7 – Pope Julius II issues a bull excommunicating Giovanni II Bentivoglio from the Roman Catholic Church, who had dominated the Italian city state of Bologna.
- October 15 – Charles II, the six-year-old son of King Philip of Castile, inherits his father's title of Duke of Burgundy and is proclaimed "Lord of the Netherlands".
- November 6 – Pope Julius II personally leads his troops into Bologna, retaking the city from the excommunicated tyrant Giovanni II Bentivoglio.
- December 8 – Sigismund I the Old (Zygmunt Jagiellon), younger brother of the late Alexander Jagiellon, becomes the King of Poland and (as Zygimantas II) the Grand Duke of Lithuania. He will reign for more than 40 years, dying in 1548 at the age of 81.

=== Date unknown ===
- The Portuguese mariner Tristão da Cunha sights the islands of Tristan da Cunha, naming them after himself.
- In Ming dynasty China, the costs of the courier system are met by a tax in silver on land, instead of corvée labor service.
- Duarte Barbosa returns to Lisbon.
- Johannes Trithemius becomes abbot of the monastery of St. Jacob, at Würzburg.
- Leonardo da Vinci completes most of his work on the Mona Lisa.

=== January–March ===
- January 24 – Sigismund I the Old is formally crowned King of Poland, at a ceremony in Kraków.
- February 9 – The crew of the Portuguese ship Cirne, commanded by Diogo Fernandes Pereira, become the first Europeans to sight the Indian ocean island of Réunion, and name it Santa Apolonia.
- March 1 – Eleven months after the Lisbon Massacre, King Manuel I of Portugal issues an edict permitting the cristãos-novos ("New Christians", Portuguese Jews who had been forced to convert to Christianity) to freely emigrate from the kingdom.
- March 11 – Italian mercenary leader and former prince Cesare Borgia, later cited by Niccolò Machiavelli in The Prince as an example of "conquest by fortune", completes his conquest of the Spanish city of Viana by driving out the defenders of the castle of the Count of Lerín, but makes the mistake of pursuing the fleeing enemy by himself. He is killed the next day by his captors.
- March 28 – The revolutionary council of the Republic of Genoa declares a war against French invaders.

=== April–June ===
- April 3 – At Erfurt, German monk Martin Luther is ordained by the suffragan bishop Johann Bonemilch as a priest of the Catholic Church.
- April 10 – Installed by the Revolutionary Council, Paolo da Novi becomes the first Doge of the Republic of Genoa in almost 19 years, after the office had been made vacant in 1488 by the conqueror Francesco Sforza. He reigns for only 18 days before fleeing from office by French occupation forces on April 28, and the dogeship will remain vacant again for five years.
- April 25 – Martin Waldseemüller publishes his Cosmographiae Introductio ("Introduction to Universal Cosmography") and accompanying wall map, the first to show the Americas as a separate continent, naming them in honour of Amerigo Vespucci, his friend and idol.
- April 27
  - In India, in what is now the state of Kerala, troops from the Kingdom of Cannanore begin a four-month siege of the Portuguese garrison at the Fort of Saint Angelo. Despite being outnumbered, the 150 defenders of the fort hold out for four months against 60,000 attackers until rescue arrives four months later.
  - In Germany, the Imperial Diet of the Holy Roman Empire convenes at Konstanz and begins a series of reforms.
- April 29 – French troops retake the city of Genoa after a seven-day siege, defeating rebels who had taken control in July 1506.
- May 14
  - Lorenzo Lotto's painting, the Santa Cristina al Tiverone Altarpiece, is unveiled at the Church of Santa Cristina in the Italian city of Treviso.
  - In Italy, King Louis XII of France departs from Genoa and makes a triumphant entry into Milan on May 24.
- June 4 – Having been denied recognition by Pope Julius II as King of Naples, King Ferdinand II of Aragon departs from Naples to return to his home in Spain.
- June 28 – Ferdinand II is welcomed by Louis XII of France at the Italian city of Savona in a spectacular ceremony, and the two monarchs begin a series of meetings on the division of the Italian kingdoms between France and Spain.

=== July—September ===
- July 3 – Ferdinand II and Louis XII complete their six-day summit at Savona.
- July 20 – King Ferdinand II of Aragon returns to Valencia to resume his rule of his Spanish kingdom.
- August 10 – Afonso de Albuquerque departs with six ships from the Yemeni island of Socotra to begin pillaging towns along the way to conquering the Persian Gulf port of Hormuz.
- August 27 – A fleet of 11 ships from the Portuguese Navy's 8th Armada arrives in India and rescues the Portuguese defenders of the fort of Saint Angelo from the attack by the Kingdom of Cannanore.
- September 15 – King James IV grants a patent for the first printing press in Scotland, to Walter Chapman and Andrew Myllar "to furnis and bring hame ane prent, with all stuff belangand tharto, and expert men to use the samyne, for imprenting within our Realme of the bukis of our Lawis, actis of parliament, croniclis, mess bukis, and portuus efter the use of our Realme, with addicions and legendis of Scottis sanctis, now gaderit to be ekit tharto, and al utheris bukis that salbe sene necessar, and to sel the sammyn for competent pricis."
- September 26 – A fleet commanded by Portugal's Afonso de Albuquerque arrives at the port of Hormuz on the Persian Gulf and sets about to conquer it.

=== October—December ===
- October 10 – The Kingdom of Portugal conquers the island of Ormuz in the Persian Gulf.
- November 24 – Portuguese Admiral Tristao da Cunha, with 12 ships, attacks a fleet of 13 Muslim merchant ships leaving the Indian port of Ponnani, and is confronted by the forces of Kutti Ali. The Portuguese win the battle.
- November 26 – Pope Julius II issues a damnatio memoriae forcing the members of the House of Borgia out of control of the Papal States.
- December 21 – Princess Mary of England, the 11-year-old daughter of King Henry VII, is betrothed to the 7-year-old Duke of Burgundy.

=== Date unknown ===
- The Timurid Dynasty ends, when Uzbeks under Muhammad Shaybani capture the capital, Herat, and Emir Badi' al-Zaman Mirza flees.
- The Portuguese occupy Mozambique, and the islands of Socotra and Lamu.
- The Portuguese found the town of Stone Town in Mozambique.
- Cardinal Cisneros is appointed inquisitor general of Castile.
- Raphael paints The Deposition, among other works.
- The Aztec New Fire ceremony is held for the last time (according to Bernardino de Sahagún).

=== January–March ===
- January 24 – Maximilian, King of the Romans, requests permission to march to Rome through Venetian territory, but is denied and begins his Italienzug.
- February 2 – During the Glinski rebellion, Lithuanian noble Mykolas Glinskis attacks Grodno (now in Belarus) and decapitates Jan Zabrzeziński, the top ally of Grand Duke Alexander.
- February 4 – Maximilian, King of the Romans, proclaims himself Holy Roman Emperor at the Italian city of Trento, after having been blocked by Venice from traveling to Rome to be crowned by Pope Julius II.
- February 20 – Maximilian I, Holy Roman Emperor, attacks the Republic of Venice and sack Ampezzo the next day.
- February 28 – Louis V becomes the new prince elector of the Palatinate upon the death of his father, Philip.
- March 2 – The Republic of Venice defeats Maximilian I in the Battle of Cadore.
- March 5 – La Cassaria by Ludovico Ariosto, the first Italian language comedy, is premiered at Ferrara.
- March 13 – The oldest annual foot race in Europe, the "Red Hose Race", is run for the first time, taking place in Scotland at Carnwath, Lanarkshire.
- March 18 – Wilhelm IV becomes the new Duke of Bavaria upon the death of his father, Albrecht IV.
- March 22
  - Working from the house of Piero di Braccio Martelli at Florence, Leonardo da Vinci begins writing his "collection without order" of his scientific discoveries.
  - Ferdinand II of Aragon appoints Florentine merchant Amerigo Vespucci to the post of Chief Navigator of Spain.

=== April–June ===
- April 23 – Prince Mihnea cel Rău, son of Vlad the Impaler, becomes the Voivode of Wallachia, with a palace at Târgoviște (now in Romania), upon the death of his cousin Radu IV the Great.
- May 8 – Italian renaissance artist Michelangelo di Lodovico Buonarroti Simoni of Florence signs a contract with the Vatican to paint the Sistine Chapel ceiling, in return for a promised fee of 3,000 gold ducats (equivalent in 2023 to more than U.S. $600,000).
- June 4 – The coronation of Prince Lajos as the designated successor to his father, King Vladislaus II of Hungary, takes place in Székesfehérvár.
- June 6 – Holy Roman Emperor Maximilian I signs a humiliating armistice with the Republic of Venice, which for the moment stops any of his further plans for Italy.

=== July–September ===
- July 23 – Upon the death of his father, King Oxlahuh-Tz'i, Hun-Iqʼ becomes one of the two kings of Guatemala's Kaqchikel Maya civilization. Hun-Iqʼ reigns jointly with King Kablahuh-Tihax until the latter's death on February 4.
- July 27 – The process of removing the former layers of paint on the ceiling of the Sistine Chapel is completed, and Michelangelo begins the next phase of marking the surface for painting.
- July 31 – The Emperor of Ethiopia, Na'od, dies in battle. His son Lebna Dengel takes on the regnal name of Dawit II, and becomes the new emperor starting on August 11.
- August 12 – The Spanish settlement of Puerto Rico begins when Juan Ponce de León lands on the island. Upon his arrival, Ponce is welcomed by Agüeybaná I, the island's leader a Cacique of the Taíno people. The Spanish explorer soon settles and founds the city of Caparra, near what is now the town of Guaynabo.
- September 11 – England is left without a Roman Catholic Cardinal protector when Cardinal Galeotto Franciotti della Rovere dies suddenly. England's King Henry VII dies seven months later before the monarchy and the Pope can agree on a new cardinal protector. The King's successor, Henry VIII, later abolishes the office entirely after Lorenzo Campeggio dies in the course of the English Reformation and the creation of the Church of England.

=== October–December ===
- October 8 – An inconclusive peace treaty is signed to end the third of the Muscovite–Lithuanian Wars.
- October 24 – King Louis XII convenes court at the Parlement de Normandie building in Rouen.
- November 1 – At the age of 16, Prince Wolfgang of the House of Ascania becomes the new ruler of the German principality of Anhalt-Köthen, succeeding his father Waldemar VI. In 1521, he will meet Martin Luther and, in 1525, will introduce the Reformation to his principality, making Anhalt-Köthen only the second nation (after the Electorate of Saxony) to officially adopt Protestantism.
- November 29 – Astronomer Mikołaj Kopernik of Poland is granted benefits by Pope Julius II in order to perform his work.
- December 10 – The League of Cambrai is formed as an alliance against the Republic of Venice, between Pope Julius II, Louis XII of France, Maximilian I, Holy Roman Emperor and Ferdinand II of Aragon.
- December 29 – Battle of Dabul: Portuguese forces, under the command of Francisco de Almeida, attack Khambhat.
- December – Michelangelo begins painting the Sistine Chapel ceiling in the Holy See of Rome, on a commission by Pope Julius II (signed May 10).

=== January–March ===
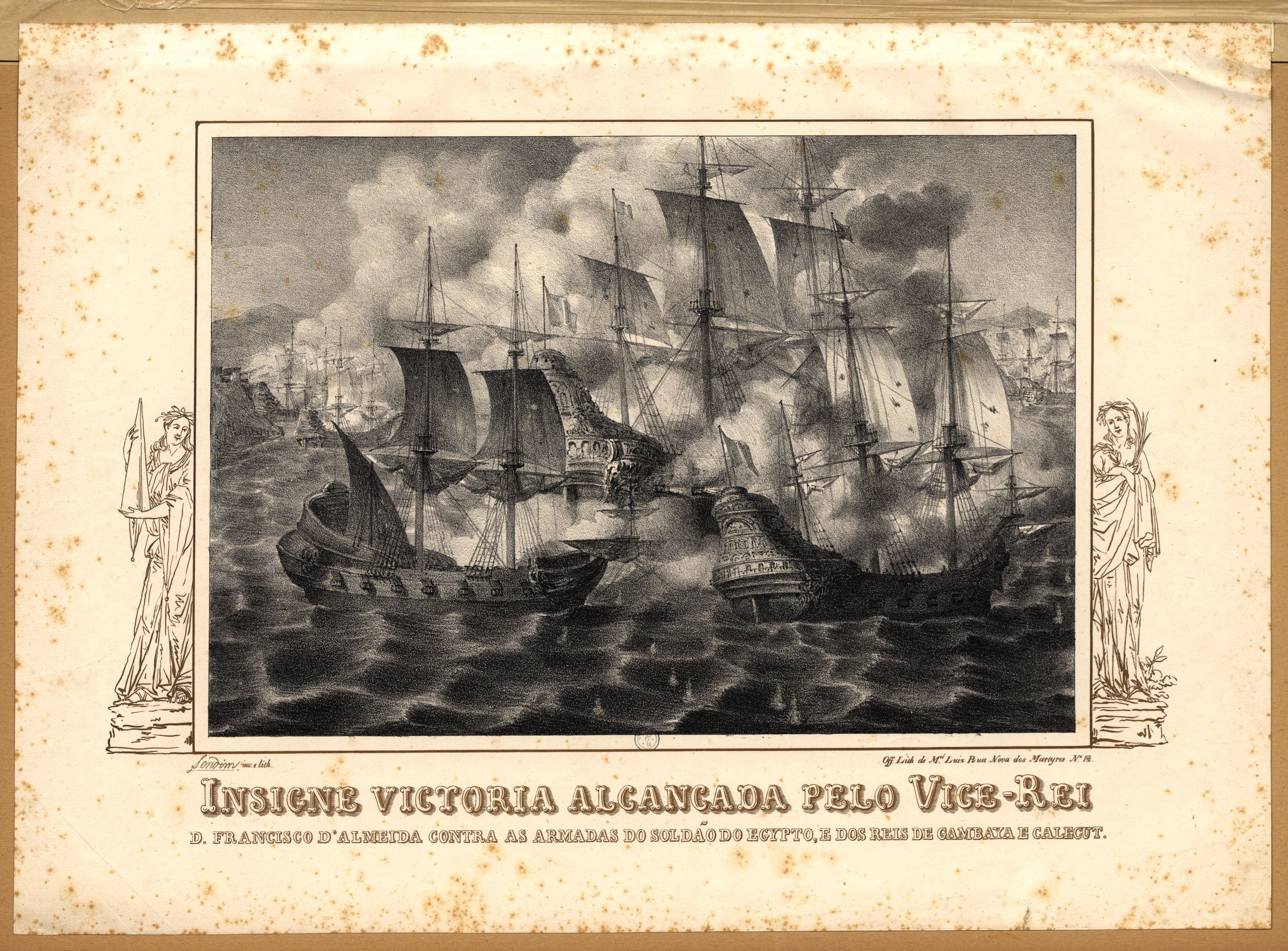
February 3: Almeida and troops defeat Indian and Egyptian forces at the Battle of Diu

- January 21 – The Portuguese first arrive at the Seven Islands of Bombay and land at Mahim after capturing a barge of the Gujarat Sultanate in the Mahim Creek.
- January 30 – French ambassador Janus Lascaris leaves Venice, after being recalled by king Louis XII in the eve of the War of the League of Cambrai.
- February 3 – Battle of Diu: The Portuguese defeat a coalition of Indians, Muslims and Italians.
- March 13 – At Bourges, the French king Louis XII ratifies treaties that were concluded 10 December 1508, regarding the creation of the League of Cambrai.
- March 18 – Maximilian I, Holy Roman Emperor, names Margaretha land guardians of the Habsburg Netherlands.
- March 23 – Pope Julius II issues the papal bull Petierunt a nobis, declaring his allegiance to the League of Cambrai.

=== April–June ===
- April 17 – In Venice, the envoy of the French king Louis XII delivers the declaration of war to the Venetian doge Leonardo Loredan, thus marking the official beginning of the War of the League of Cambrai.
- April 21 – Henry VIII becomes King of England on the death of his father, Henry VII.
- April 27 – Pope Julius II places Venice under interdict and excommunication for refusing to cede part of Romagna to papal control.
- May 2 – Juan Ponce de León obtains authorization to bring his family from Spain to his home in the Casa de Contratación in Caparra, Puerto Rico.
- May 9
  - The French army under the command of Louis XII crosses the Adda River at Cassano d'Adda.
  - The Venetians, encamped around the town of Treviglio, move south towards the Po River in search of better positions.
- May 14 – Battle of Agnadello: French forces defeat the Venetians. The League of Cambrai occupies Venice's mainland territories.
- May 17 – Venice made an effort to appease the emperor Maximilian I by offering various political and territorial concessions, but the effort failed.
- June 11
  - Henry VIII marries Catherine of Aragon.
  - Luca Pacioli's De divina proportione, concerning the golden ratio, is published in Venice, with illustrations by Leonardo da Vinci.
- June 19 – Brasenose College, Oxford, is founded by a lawyer, Sir Richard Sutton, of Prestbury, Cheshire, and the Bishop of Lincoln, William Smyth.
- June 24 – King Henry VIII and Queen Consort Catherine of Aragon are crowned.

=== July–September ===
- July 17 – Venetian forces retake the city of Padua from French forces.
- July 26 – Krishnadevaraya ascends the throne of the Vijayanagara Empire.
- August 10 – Maximillian I of the Holy Roman Empire along with French allies begins a siege of Padua that would last for months to retake the city.
- August 19 – Maximillian I orders all Jews within the Holy Roman Empire to destroy all books opposing Christianity.
- September 10 – The Constantinople earthquake destroys 109 mosques and kills an estimated 10,000 people.
- September 11 – Portuguese fidalgo Diogo Lopes de Sequeira becomes the first European to reach Malacca, having crossed the Gulf of Bengal.
- September 27 – A violent storm ravages the Dutch coast, killing potentially thousands of people.

=== October–December ===
- October 1 – The siege of Padua ends with Venetian victory, causing the retreat of HRE and French forces back to Tyrol and Milan.
- November 4 – Afonso de Albuquerque becomes the Viceroy of Portuguese India, replacing Francisco de Almeida, who departs five days later from Diu. Almeida never makes it home, getting killed along with his 64 men in a battle on March 1 with the local Khoekhoe people at South Africa's Cape of Good Hope.
- November 10 – Uriel von Gemmingen is assigned to secure others' opinions before continuing the Jewish book purge started on August 19th.
- December 1 – Prince Le Oanh is installed as the new Emperor of Vietnam by a coup d'etat against his cousin, Emperor Le Uy Muc, and is enthroned at the age of 14 as Emperor Le Tuong Duc. Uy Muc is granted his request to be allowed to commit suicide rather than to be executed.

=== Date unknown ===
- Erasmus writes his most famous work, In Praise of Folly.
- St Paul's School, London is founded by John Colet, Dean of St Paul's Cathedral.
- Royal Grammar School, Guildford, England, is founded under the will of Robert Beckingham.
- Queen Elizabeth's Grammar School, Blackburn, England, is founded as a grammar school for boys.
- Georg Tannstetter is appointed by Maximilian I as the Professor of Astronomy at the University of Vienna.
- Johannes Pfefferkorn writes his fourth and fifth pamphlets condemning the Jewish faith and people, Das Osterbuch and Der Judenfeind.
- Basil Solomon becomes Syriac Orthodox Maphrian of the East.

== Births ==
1500

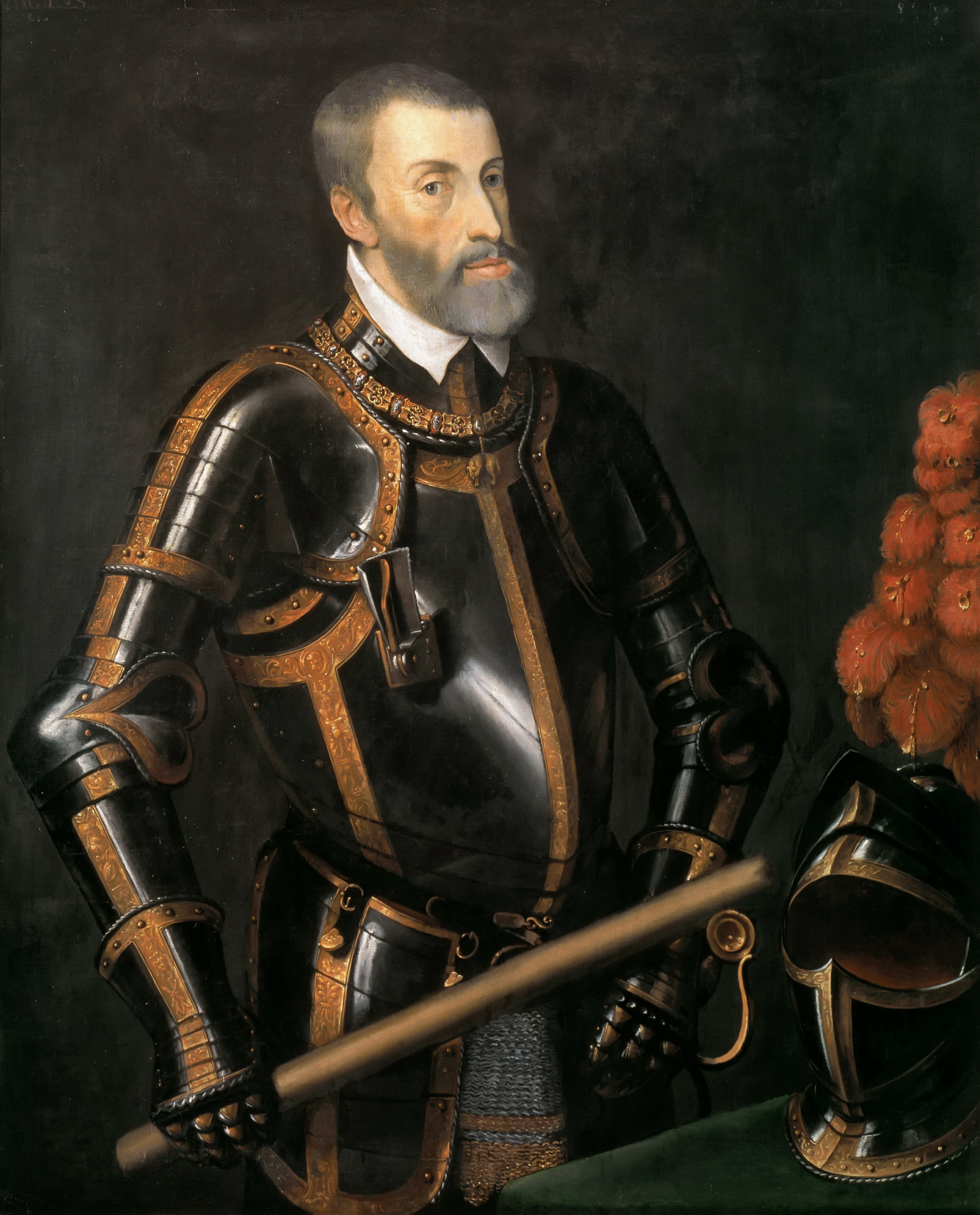
Emperor Charles V

- January 6 – John of Ávila, Spanish mystic and saint (d. 1569)
- January 20 – Jean Quintin, French priest, knight and writer (d. 1561)
- February 22 – Cardinal Rodolfo Pio da Carpi, Italian humanist (d. 1564)
- February 24 – Charles V, Holy Roman Emperor (d. 1558)
- February 27 – João de Castro, Portuguese nobleman and fourth viceroy of Portuguese India (d. 1548)
- March 3 – Reginald Pole, Archbishop of Canterbury (d. 1558)
- April 12 – Joachim Camerarius, German classical scholar (d. 1574)
- April 23
  - Alexander Ales, Scottish theologian (d. 1565)
  - Johann Stumpf, Swiss writer (d. 1576)
- April 27 – Louis, Count of Vaudémont, Italian bishop (d. 1528)
- May 17 – Federico II Gonzaga, Duke of Mantua (d. 1540)
- June 13 – Ernest of Bavaria, pledge lord of the County of Glatz (d. 1560)
- July 1 – Federico Cesi (cardinal), Italian cardinal (d. 1565)
- July 20 – Lorenzo Cybo, Italian condottiero (d. 1549)
- August 16 – Louis Gonzaga (Rodomonte), Italian-French dignitary and diplomat (d. 1532)
- September 5 – Maria of Jever, last ruler of the Lordship of Jever (d. 1575)
- September 7 – Sebastian Newdigate, Carthusian monk and martyr (d. 1535)
- September 17 – Sebastiano Antonio Pighini, Italian cardinal (d. 1553)
- October 17 – Alonso de Orozco Mena, Spanish Roman Catholic priest (d. 1591)
- November 3 – Benvenuto Cellini, Italian goldsmith and sculptor (d. 1571)
- December 6 – Nicolaus Mameranus, Luxembourgish soldier and historian (d. 1567)
- probable
  - Johannes Aal, Swiss theologian and composer (d. 1553)
  - Charles Dumoulin, French jurist (d. 1566)
  - Wu Cheng'en, Chinese novelist (d. 1582)
  - Heinrich Faber, German music theorist (d. 1552)
  - Francisco de Moraes, Portuguese writer (d. 1572)
  - Jeanne de la Font, French poet and culture patron (d. 1532)
  - Solomon Molcho, Portuguese mystic (d. 1532)

1501

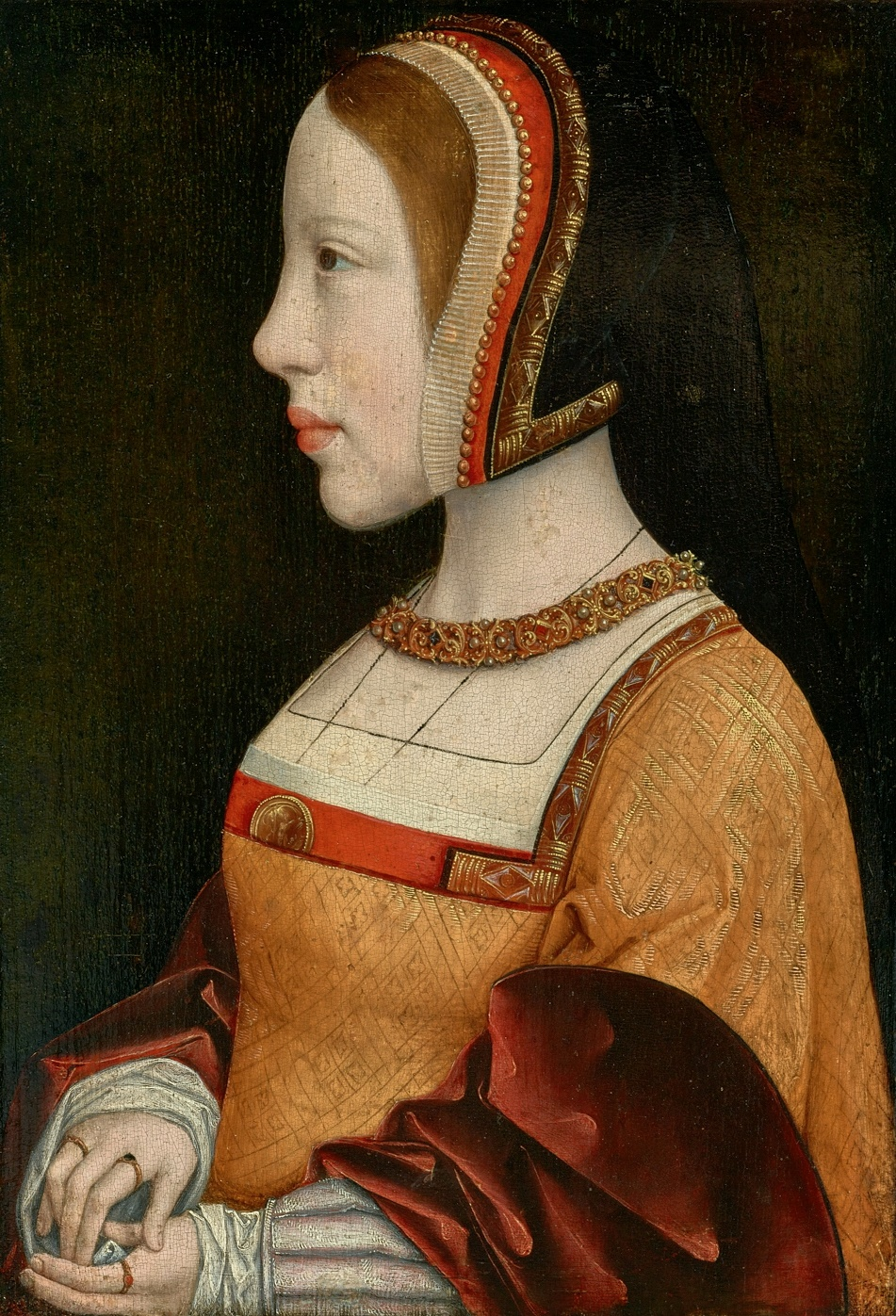
Isabella of Burgundy

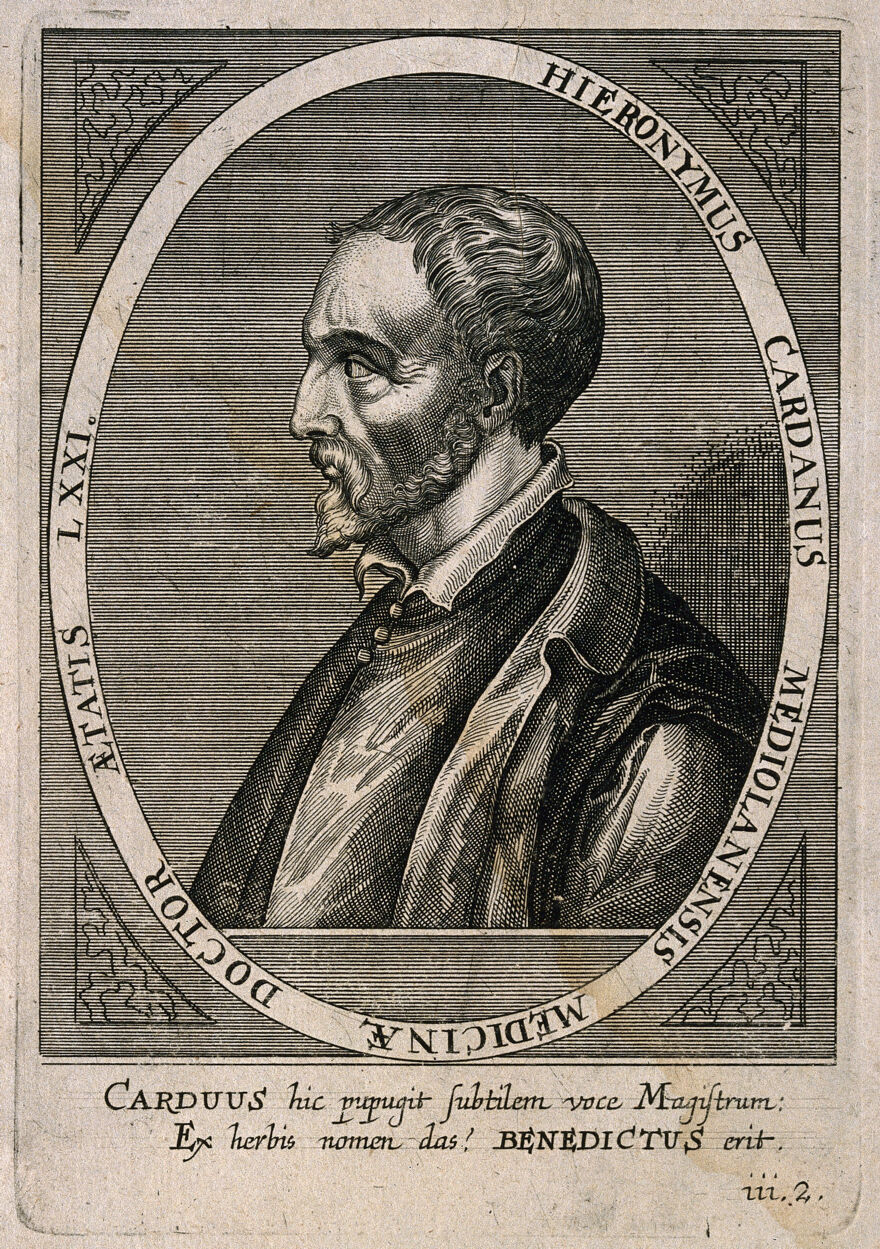
Gerolamo Cardano

- January 16 – Anthony Denny, confidant of Henry VIII of England (d. 1559)
- January 17 – Leonhart Fuchs, German physician and botanist (d. 1566)
- January 24 – Jacob Milich, German astronomer and mathematician (d. 1559)
- February 24 – Sixt Birck, German humanist (d. 1554)
- March 21 – Anne Brooke, Baroness Cobham, English noble (d. 1558)
- March 12 – Pietro Andrea Mattioli, Italian scientist (d. 1577)
- May 6 – Pope Marcellus II (d. 1555)
- May 17 – Stanisław of Masovia, Polish duke (d. 1524)
- July 10 – Cho Sik, Korean Confucian scholar and politician (d. 1572)
- July 18 – Isabella of Burgundy, queen of Christian II of Denmark (d. 1526)
- August 17 – Philipp II, Count of Hanau-Münzenberg (d. 1529)
- September 18 – Henry Stafford, 1st Baron Stafford, English baron (d. 1563)
- September 24 – Gerolamo Cardano, Italian mathematician, physician, astrologer and gambler (d. 1576)
- September 26 – Gian Gabriele I of Saluzzo, Italian abbot, Marquess of Saluzzo (d. 1548)
- November 14 – Anna of Oldenburg, Regent of East Frisia from 1540 to 1561 (d. 1575)
- December 2 – Queen Munjeong, Korean queen (d. 1565)
- date unknown
  - Girolamo da Carpi, Italian painter (d. 1556)
  - Dawit II, Emperor of Ethiopia (d. 1540)
  - Bauck Poppema, Dutch noble and heroine
  - Anne Boleyn, second queen of Henry VIII of England (b. this year or 1507; d. 1536)
  - Murakami Yoshikiyo, Japanese nobleman (d. 1573)
- probable
  - Nicholas Heath, archbishop of York and Lord Chancellor (d. 1578)
  - Garcia de Orta, Portuguese physician (d. 1568)
  - Hilaire Penet, French composer

1502

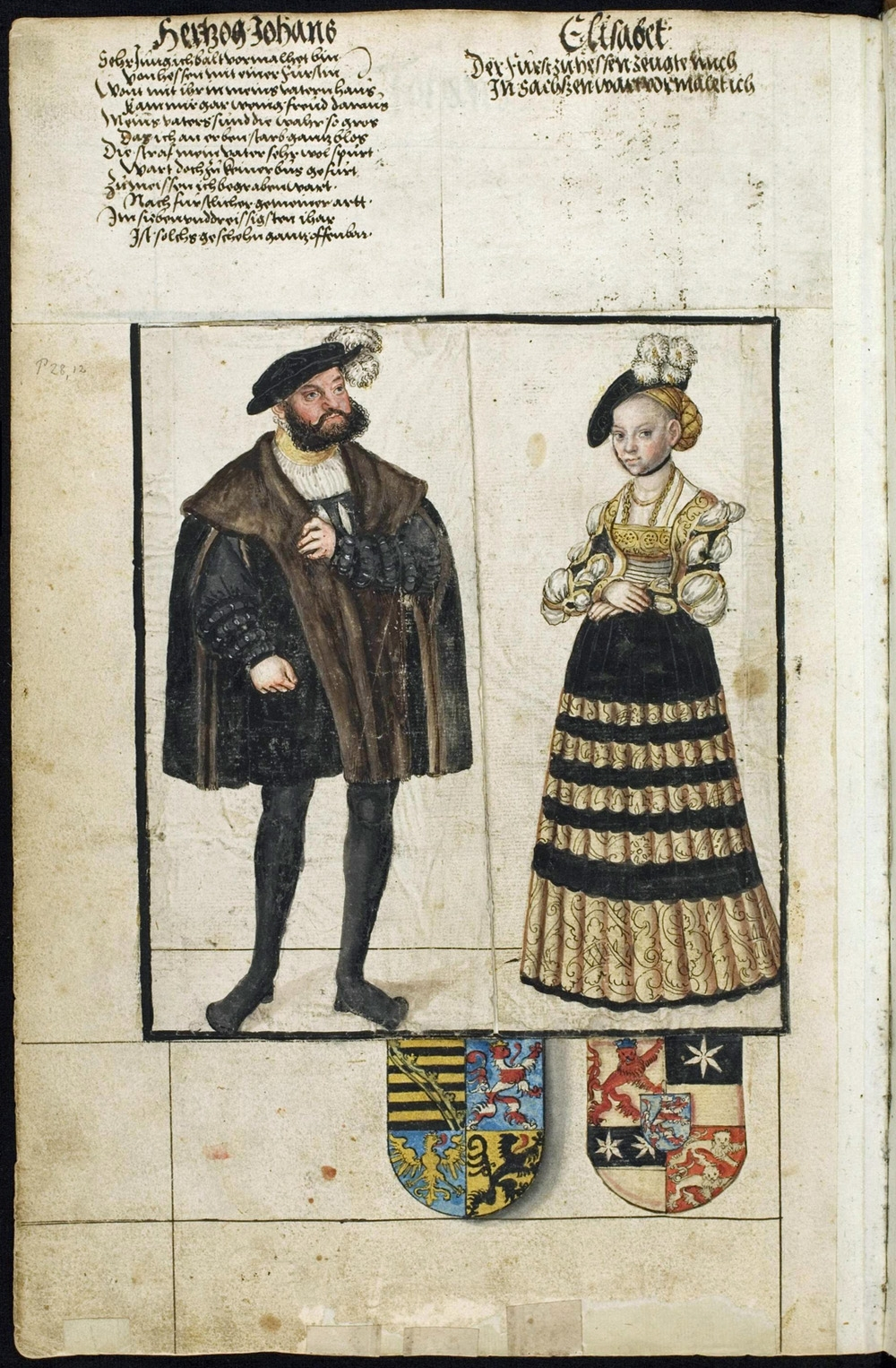
Elisabeth of Hesse, Hereditary Princess of Saxony

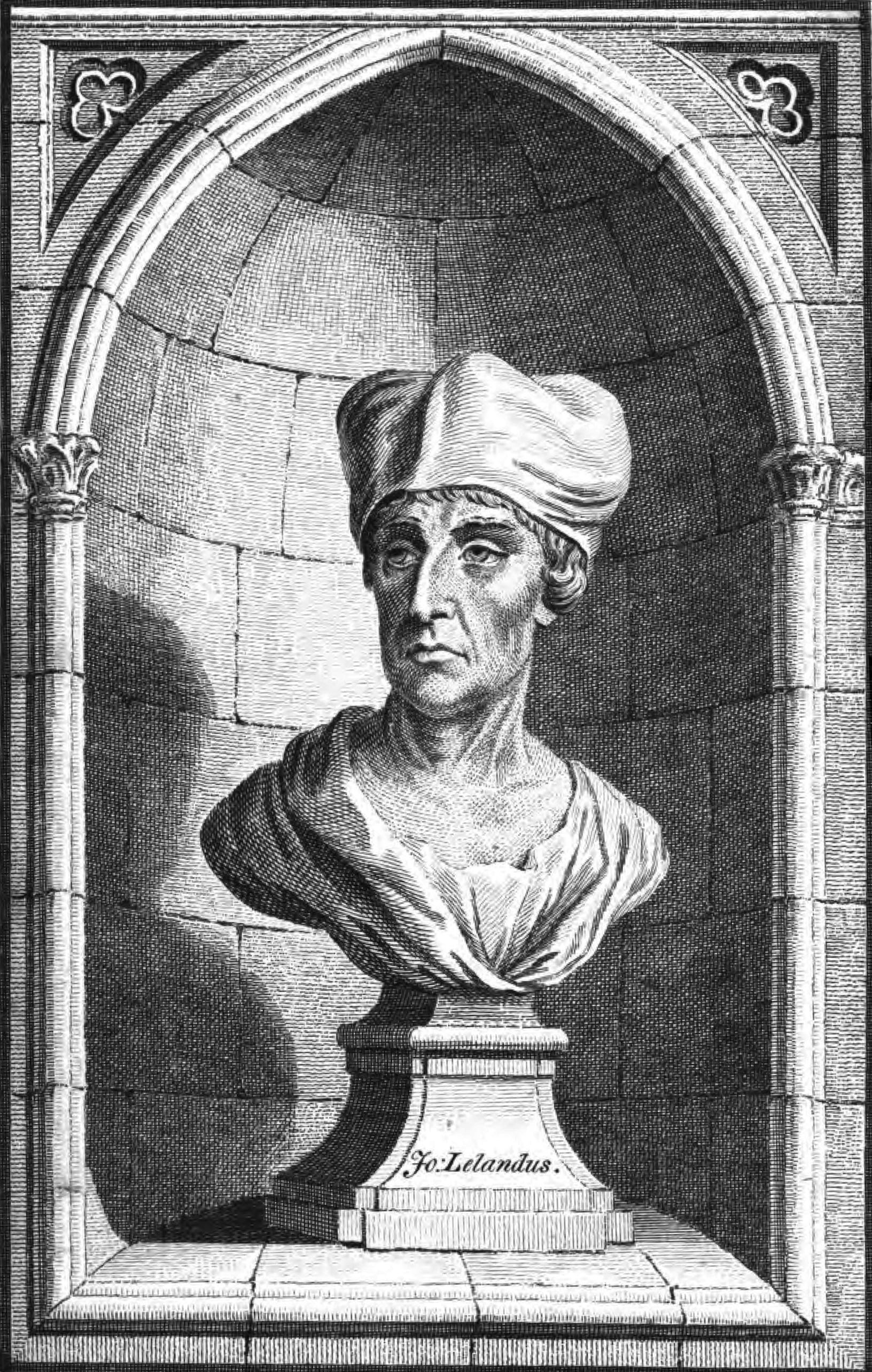
John Leland

- January 3 – Yi Hwang, Korean Neo-Confucian scholar (d.1571)
- January 7 (Julian) (January 17 Gregorian)– Pope Gregory XIII, born Ugo Boncompagni, Bolognese-born pontiff (d. 1585)
- January 20 – Sebastian de Aparicio, Spanish colonial industrialist and saint in Mexico (d. 1600)
- February 2 – Damião de Góis, Portuguese philosopher (d. 1574)
- March 4 – Elisabeth of Hesse, Hereditary Princess of Saxony (d. 1557)
- March 18 – Philibert of Chalon, French nobleman (d. 1530)
- March 20 – Pierino Belli, Italian soldier and jurist (d. 1575)
- April 2 – Susanna of Bavaria, German noble of the House of Wittelsbach (d. 1543)
- April 10 – Otto Henry, Count Palatine of Neuburg (1505–1559) and Elector Palatine (1556–1559) (d. 1559)
- April 25 – Georg Major, German Lutheran theologian (d. 1574)
- June 2 – Guillaume Bigot, French writer (d. 1550)
- June 6 – King John III of Portugal (d. 1557)
- July 26 – Christian Egenolff, German printer (d. 1555)
- July 27 – Francesco Corteccia, Italian composer (d. 1571)
- August 14 – Pieter Coecke van Aelst, Flemish painter (d. 1550)
- September 14 – Louis II, Count Palatine of Zweibrücken, Duke of Zweibrücken from 1514 to 1532 (d. 1532)
- December 6 – Anna of Brunswick-Lüneburg, Duchess consort of Pomerania (d. 1568)
- December 13 – George III, Landgrave of Leuchtenberg (d. 1555)
- date unknown
  - Takeno Jōō, Japanese Sengoku period master of the tea ceremony and merchant (d. 1555)
  - Miguel López de Legazpi, Spanish conquistador (d. 1572)
  - Pedro Nunes, Portuguese mathematician (d. 1578)
  - Francesco Spiera, Italian Protestant jurist (d. 1543)
  - Anthony Maria Zaccaria, Cremonese founder of the Barnabite Order and saint (d. 1539)
- probable
  - Elizabeth Blount, English courtier, mistress of King Henry VIII (d. 1540)
  - Cuauhtémoc, last Aztec ruler (Tlatoani) of Tenochtitlán and the last "Aztec Emperor" (d. 1525)
  - Blaise de Lasseran-Massencôme, seigneur de Montluc, marshal of France (approximate date; d. 1577)
  - Hurrem Sultan, Ruthenian-born Haseki sultan of the Ottoman Empire (d. 1558)
  - Henry Percy, 6th Earl of Northumberland, English courtier (d. 1537)

1503

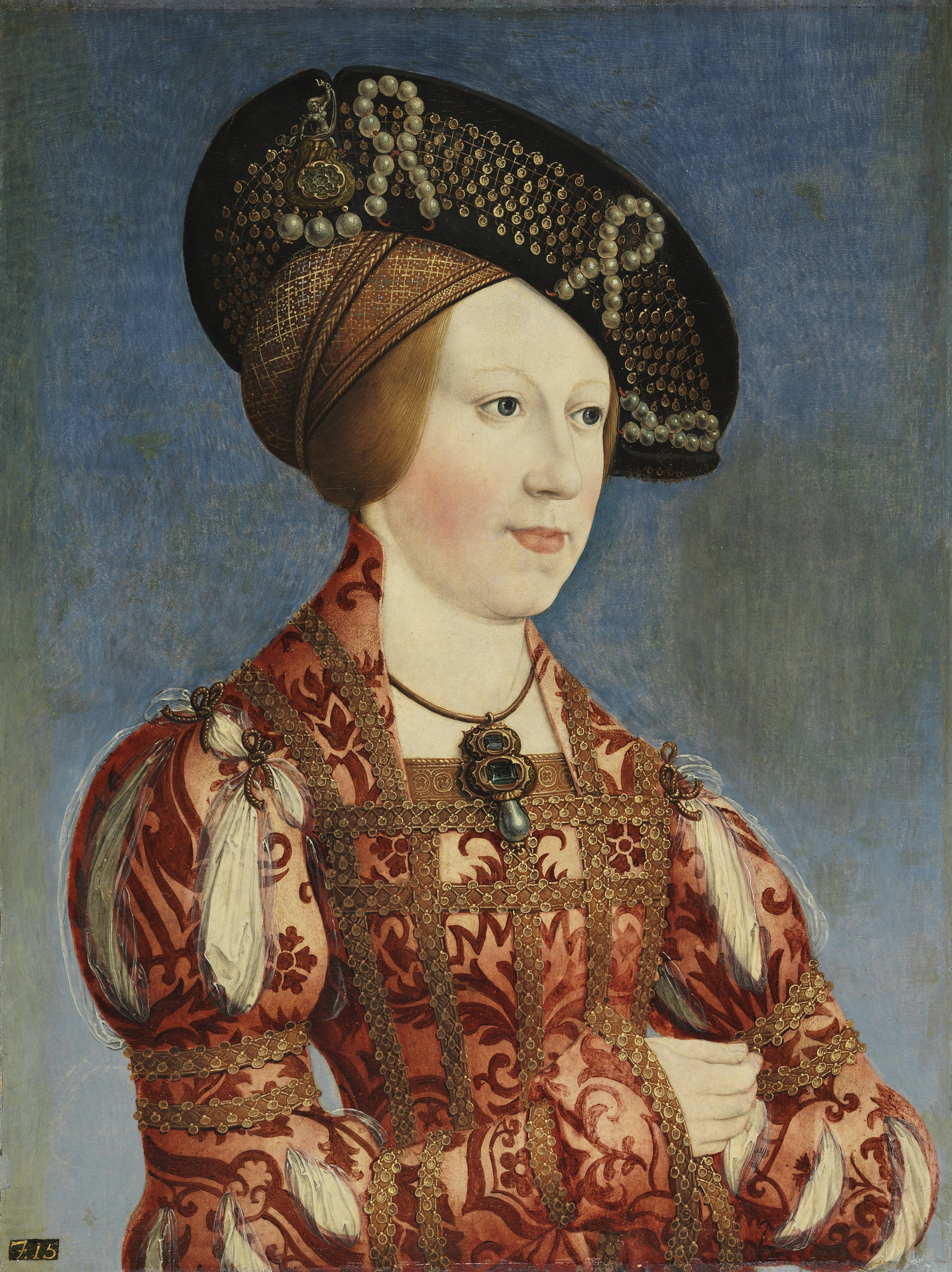
Queen Anne of Bohemia and Hungary

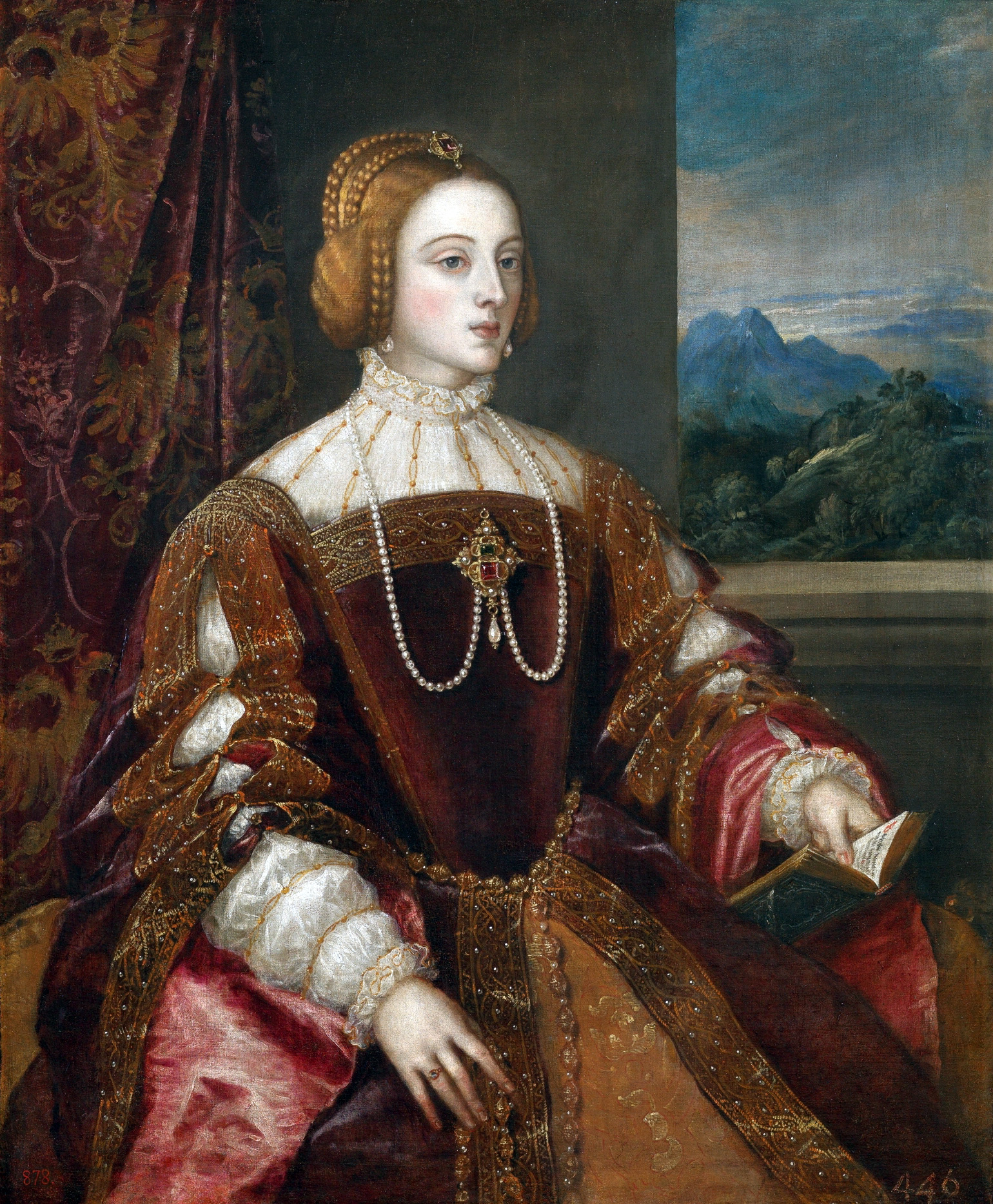
Queen Isabella of Portugal

- January 3 – Al-Mutahhar, Imam of the Zaidi state of Yemen (d. 1572)
- January 11 – Parmigianino (Girolamo Francesco Maria Mazzola), Italian artist (d. 1540)
- January 18 – Joachim of Münsterberg-Oels, Duke of Münsterberg, Duke of Oels, Count of Kladsko, Bishop of Brandenburg (d. 1562)
- February 24 – Johann Gropper, German Catholic cardinal (d. 1559)
- March 10 – Ferdinand I, Holy Roman Emperor (d. 1564)
- March 11 – George Harper, English politician (d. 1558)
- March 22 – Antonio Francesco Grazzini, Italian writer (d. 1584)
- April 6 – Jacob Micyllus, German humanist (d. 1558)
- April 18 – Henry II of Navarre, King of Navarre (1517–1555) (d. 1555)
- May 1 – Celio Secondo Curione, Italian humanist (d. 1569)
- June 1 – Wilhelm von Grumbach, German adventurer (d. 1567)
- June 28 – Giovanni della Casa, Italian poet (d. 1556)
- June 30 – John Frederick I, Elector of Saxony (d. 1554)
- July 23 – Anne of Bohemia and Hungary, Queen consort of the Romans, Bohemia and Hungary (d. 1547)
- August 12 – Christian III of Denmark and Norway (d. 1559)
- September 10 – Elisabeth of Hesse, Countess Palatine of Zweibrücken, later Countess Palatine of Simmern (d. 1563)
- October 4 – Isabella of Portugal, Queen of Spain (d. 1539)
- November 12 – Philip, Duke of Palatinate-Neuburg, German duke (d. 1548)
- November 13 – Ippolita Gonzaga, Italian nun (d. 1570)
- November 17 – Agnolo di Cosimo, Italian artist and poet (d. 1572)
- November 19 – Pier Luigi Farnese, Duke of Parma (d. 1547)
- December 14 – Michel de Nostredame, called Nostradamus, French physician and writer of Les Propheties (1555) (d. 1566)
- December 20 – Cosimo Bartoli, Italian diplomat and writer (d. 1572)
- date unknown
  - Lucas David, Prussian historian (d. 1583)
  - Robert Estienne, French printer (d. 1559)
  - John Frith, English Protestant priest and martyr (d. 1533)
  - Susannah Hornebolt, English artist (d. c. 1554)
  - Lakandula, Lakan of Tondo (d. 1589)
  - Shimazu Katsuhisa, Japanese nobleman (d. 1573)
  - Tomé de Sousa, Portuguese nobleman, first general-governor of Brazil (d. 1573 or 1579)
  - Thomas Wyatt, English lyric poet and diplomat (d. 1542)
- probable – Nicholas Bourbon, French poet

1504

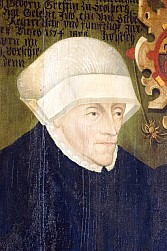
Anna II, Princess-Abbess of Quedlinburg

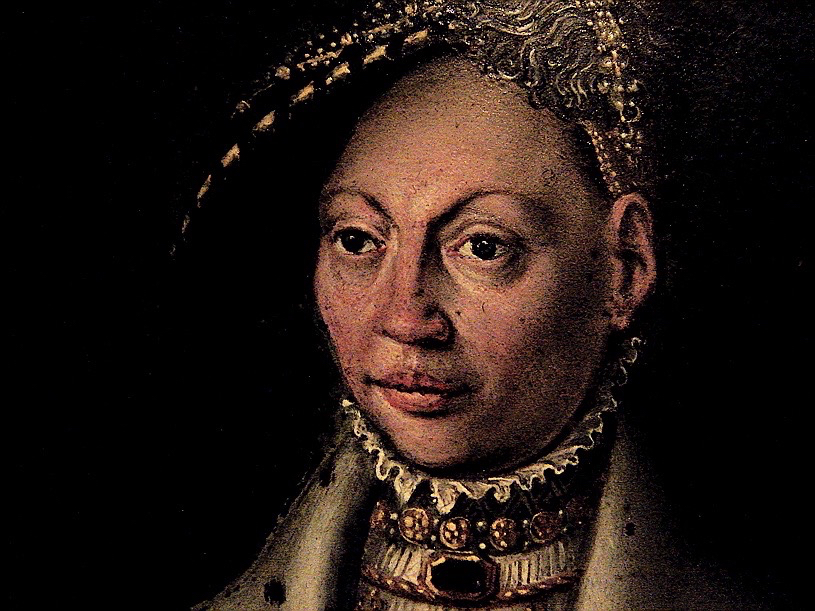
Dorothea of Denmark, Duchess of Prussia

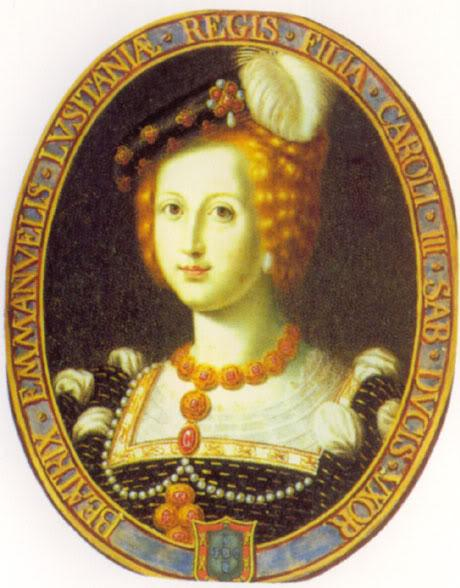
Beatrice of Portugal, Duchess of Savoy

- January 1 – Caspar Creuziger, German humanist (d. 1548)
- January 17 – Pope Pius V (d. 1572)
- January 28 – Anna II, Princess-Abbess of Quedlinburg, German noblewoman, reigning from 1516 until her death (d. 1574)
- February 3 – Scipione Rebiba, Italian cardinal (d. 1577)
- March 31 – Guru Angad, Indian religious leader (d. 1552)
- April 12 – Alessandro Campeggio, Italian cardinal (d. 1554)
- April 30 – Francesco Primaticcio, Italian painter (d. 1570)
- May 5 – Stanislaus Hosius, Polish cardinal (d. 1579)
- May 29 – Antun Vrančić, Croatian archbishop (d. 1573)
- June 24 – Johannes Mathesius, German theologian (d. 1565)
- July 18 – Heinrich Bullinger, Swiss religious reformer (d. 1575)
- August 1 – Dorothea of Denmark, Duchess of Prussia, Danish princess (d. 1547)
- August 6 – Matthew Parker, English Archbishop of Canterbury (d. 1574)
- September 4 – John V, Prince of Anhalt-Zerbst, Prince of Anahlt-Dessau (1516–1544) and Anhalt-Zerbst (1544–1551) (d. 1551)
- September 20 – Philip III, Count of Nassau-Weilburg (d. 1559)
- October 29 – Shin Saimdang, Korean calligraphist and noted poet (d. 1551)
- November – Giovanni Battista Giraldi, Italian novelist and poet (d. 1573)
- November 13 – Philip I, Landgrave of Hesse (d. 1567)
- December – Nicholas Udall, English playwright and schoolmaster (d. 1556)
- December 31 – Beatrice of Portugal, Duchess of Savoy (d. 1538)
- date unknown
  - John Dudley, 1st Duke of Northumberland, English Tudor nobleman and politician (executed 1553)
  - Patrick Hamilton, Scottish churchman and Reformer (burned at the stake 1528)
  - Dirk Philips, early Dutch Anabaptist writer and theologian (d. 1568)

1505

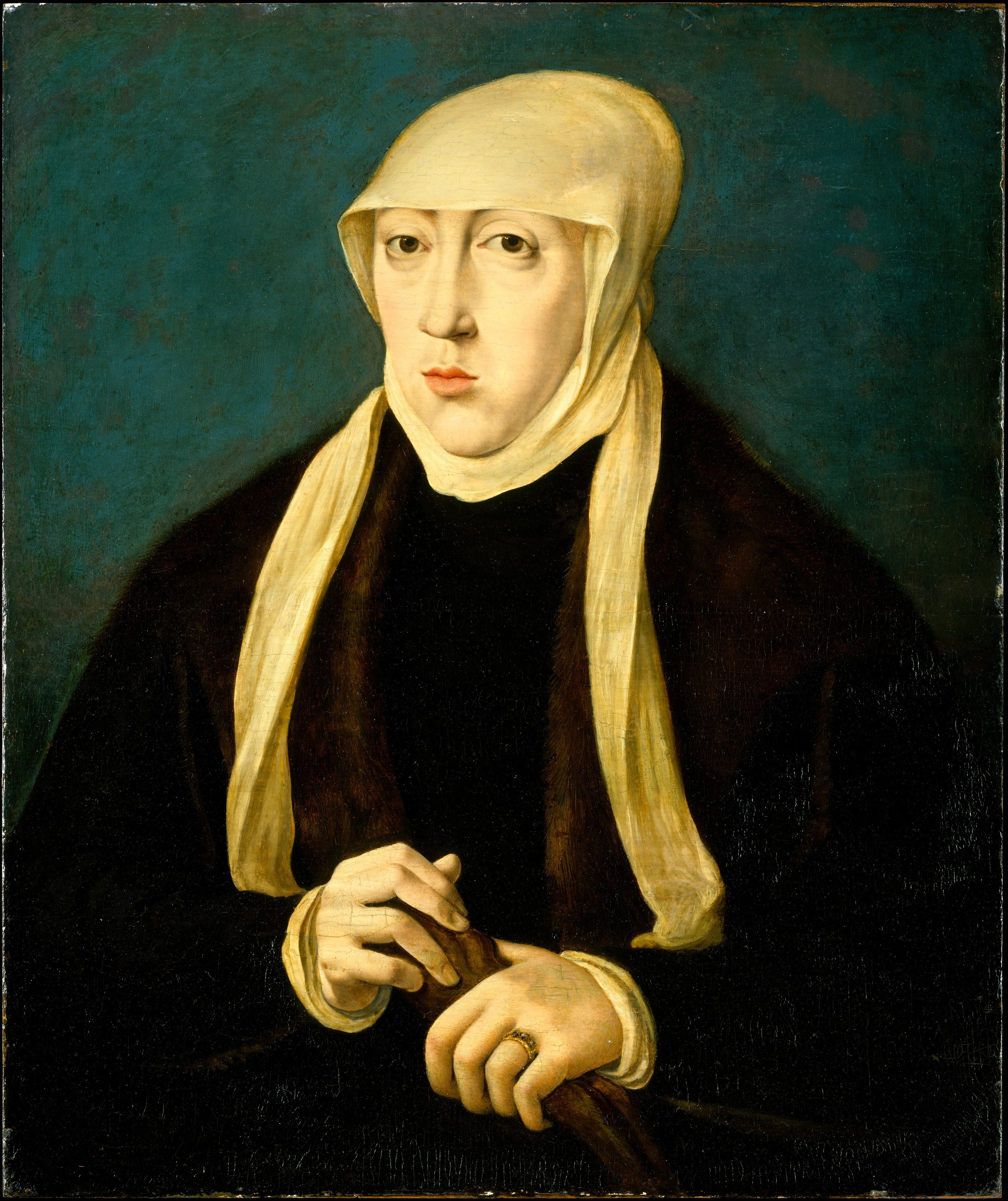
Mary of Hungary

- January 12 – Louis, Count of Stolberg, German nobleman (d. 1574)
- January 13 – Joachim II Hector, Elector of Brandenburg, Imperial Elector (d. 1571)
- February 4 – Mikołaj Rej, Polish poet and prose writer, politician and musician of the Renaissance (d. 1569)
- February 5 – Aegidius Tschudi, Swiss historian (d. 1572)
- March 16 – Francisco Balbi di Correggio (d. 1589)
- March 25 – Elizabeth Grey, Viscountess Lisle, English heiress (d. 1519)
- May 20 – Levinus Lemnius, Dutch writer (d. 1568)
- September 15 – Mary of Hungary, Dutch ruler (d. 1558)
- September 23 – Anne de Laval, Viscountess of Thouars, French noblewoman and nominal pretender to the Kingdom of Naples (d. 1554)
- November 3 – Achilles Gasser, German physician and astrologer (d. 1577)
- November 23 – Ercole Gonzaga, Spanish Catholic cardinal (d. 1563)
- December 18 – Philipp von Hutten, German explorer (d. 1546)
- December 21 – Thomas Wriothesley, 1st Earl of Southampton, English politician (d. 1550)
- December 25 – Christine of Saxony, German noble (d. 1549)
- date unknown
  - Philip Hoby, English politician (d. 1558)
  - Guillaume Morel, French classical scholar (d. 1564)
  - Margaret Roper, English writer (d. 1544)
  - Shahghali, Khan of Qasim
- probable
  - Christopher Tye, English composer and organist (d. 1572)
  - Jane Boleyn, Viscountess Rochford, English noblewoman (executed 1542)

1506

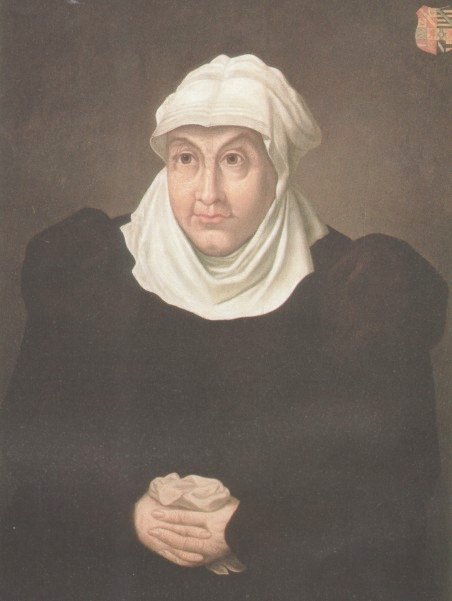
Juliana of Stolberg

- February – George Buchanan, Scottish humanist scholar (d. 1582)
- February 2 – René de Birague, French cardinal and chancellor (d. 1583)
- February 15 – Juliana of Stolberg, German countess (d. 1580)
- March 3 – Luís of Portugal, Duke of Beja (d. 1555)
- April 7 – Francis Xavier, Spanish Jesuit saint (d. 1552)
- April 13 – Peter Faber, French Jesuit theologian (d. 1546)
- July 1 – Louis II of Hungary and Bohemia (d. 1526)
- August 12 – Franciscus Sonnius, Dutch counter-Reformation theologian (d. 1576)
- October – Louis de Blois, Flemish mystical writer (d. 1566)
- December 4 – Thomas Darcy, 1st Baron Darcy of Chiche, English courtier (d. 1558)
- December 8 – Veit Dietrich, German theologian, writer and reformer (d. 1549)
- date unknown
  - Vicente Masip, Spanish painter (d. 1579)
  - William Paget, 1st Baron Paget, English statesman (d. 1563)
  - Ii Naomori, Japanese samurai (d. 1560)
- probable
  - Elizabeth Barton, English nun (d. 1534)
  - Margaret Lee, confidante of Queen Anne Boleyn (d. 1543)

1507

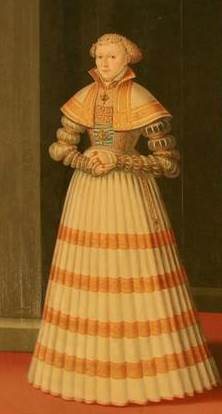
Anna of Brandenburg, Duchess of Mecklenburg

- January 1 – Anna of Brandenburg, Duchess of Mecklenburg-Güstrow (d. 1567)
- January 14
  - Catherine of Austria, Queen of Portugal (d. 1578)
  - Luca Longhi, Italian painter (d. 1580)
- January 25 – Johannes Oporinus, Swiss printer (d. 1568)
- February 11 – Philip II, Metropolitan of Moscow, Russian Orthodox monk (d. 1569)
- February 21 – James, Duke of Rothesay, Scottish prince (d. 1508)
- March 7 – Magdalena of Saxony (d. 1534)
- March 25 – Thomas White, English politician (d. 1566)
- March 29 – Henry II, Duke of Münsterberg-Oels and Count of Glatz (d. 1548)
- April 13 – Konrad Hubert, German theologian and hymnwriter (d. 1577)
- May 9 – Tijmen Groenewegen, Dutch politician
- June 5 – Ferdinand of Portugal, Duke of Guarda and Trancoso, Portuguese nobleman (d. 1534)
- June 6 – Annibale Caro, Italian poet and Knight of Malta (d. 1566)
- June 25 – Marie of Baden-Sponheim, duchess consort of Bavaria (d. 1580)
- July 25 – Chamaraja Wodeyar IV, King of Mysore (d. 1576)
- August 2 – William Waldegrave, English Member of Parliament (d. 1554)
- August 15 – George III, Prince of Anhalt-Dessau, German prince (d. 1553)
- September 16 – Jiajing Emperor of China (d. 1567)
- September 27 – Guillaume Rondelet, French physician (d. 1566)
- October 1
  - Johannes Sturm, German educator (d. 1589)
  - Giacomo Barozzi da Vignola, Italian architect (d. 1573)
- October 4 – Francis Bigod, British noble (d. 1537)
- October 19 – Viglius, Dutch politician (d. 1577)
- October 26 – Alvise I Mocenigo, Doge of Venice (d. 1577)
- October 29 – Fernando Alvarez de Toledo, Spanish general (d. 1582)
- November 25 – Joos de Damhouder, Belgian jurist (d. 1581)
- December 18 – Ōuchi Yoshitaka, Japanese warlord (d. 1551)
- date unknown
  - Bálint Bakfark, Hungarian composer (d. 1576)
  - Sir Ralph Sadler, English statesman (d. 1587)
- probable
  - Jacques Arcadelt, Franco-Flemish composer (d. 1568)
  - Inés Suárez, Spanish conquistadora (d. 1580)
- possible
  - Anne Boleyn, second queen of Henry VIII (b. this year or 1501; d. 1536)

1508

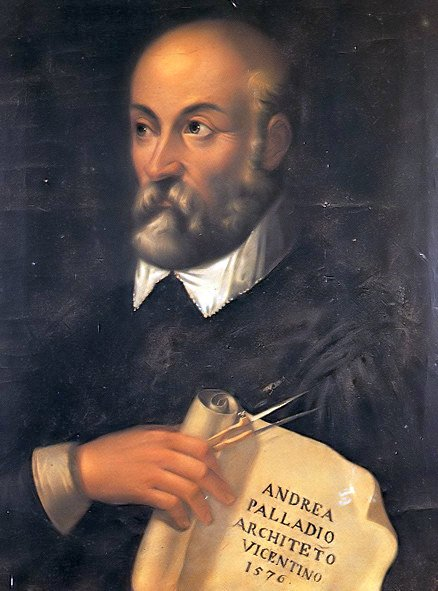
Andrea Palladio

- February 17 – Bernardo Salviati, Italian Catholic cardinal (d. 1568)
- March 6 – Mirza Nasir-ud-Din Muhammad, emperor of the Mughal Empire (d. 1556)
- April 3 – Jean Daurat, French writer and scholar (d. 1588)
- April 5 – Ercole II d'Este, Duke of Ferrara, Italian noble (d. 1559)
- April 23 – Georg Sabinus, German writer (d. 1560)
- May 8 – Charles Wriothesley, English Officer of Arms (d. 1562)
- June 8 or June 9 – Primož Trubar, Slovenian Protestant reformer who lays the foundations for the Slovenian written language (d. 1586)
- June 12 – Hedwig of Münsterberg-Oels, German noble (d. 1531)
- June 13 – Alessandro Piccolomini, Italian humanist and philosopher from Siena (d. 1579)
- June 29 – Balthasar of Hanau-Münzenberg, German nobleman (d. 1534)
- September 19 – Maria Paleologa, Italian noblewoman (d. 1530)
- September 23 – Simon Sulzer, Swiss theologian (d. 1585)
- September 25 – Francisco Mendoza de Bobadilla, Spanish Catholic cardinal (d. 1566)
- November 23 – Francis, Duke of Brunswick-Lüneburg, youngest son of Henry the Middle (d. 1549)
- November 26 – Cristofano Gherardi, Italian painter (d. 1556)
- November 30 – Andrea Palladio, Italian architect (d. 1580)
- December 8 – Gemma Frisius, Dutch mathematician and cartographer (d. 1555)
- December 21 – Thomas Naogeorgus, German playwright (d. 1563)
- December 24 – Pietro Carnesecchi, Italian humanist (d. 1567)
- date unknown
  - Livio Agresti, Italian painter (d. 1580)
  - Matsunaga Hisahide, Japanese daimyo (d. 1577)
  - Marin Držić, Croatian playwright (d. 1567)
- possible
  - Jane Seymour, third queen of Henry VIII (d. 1537)

1509

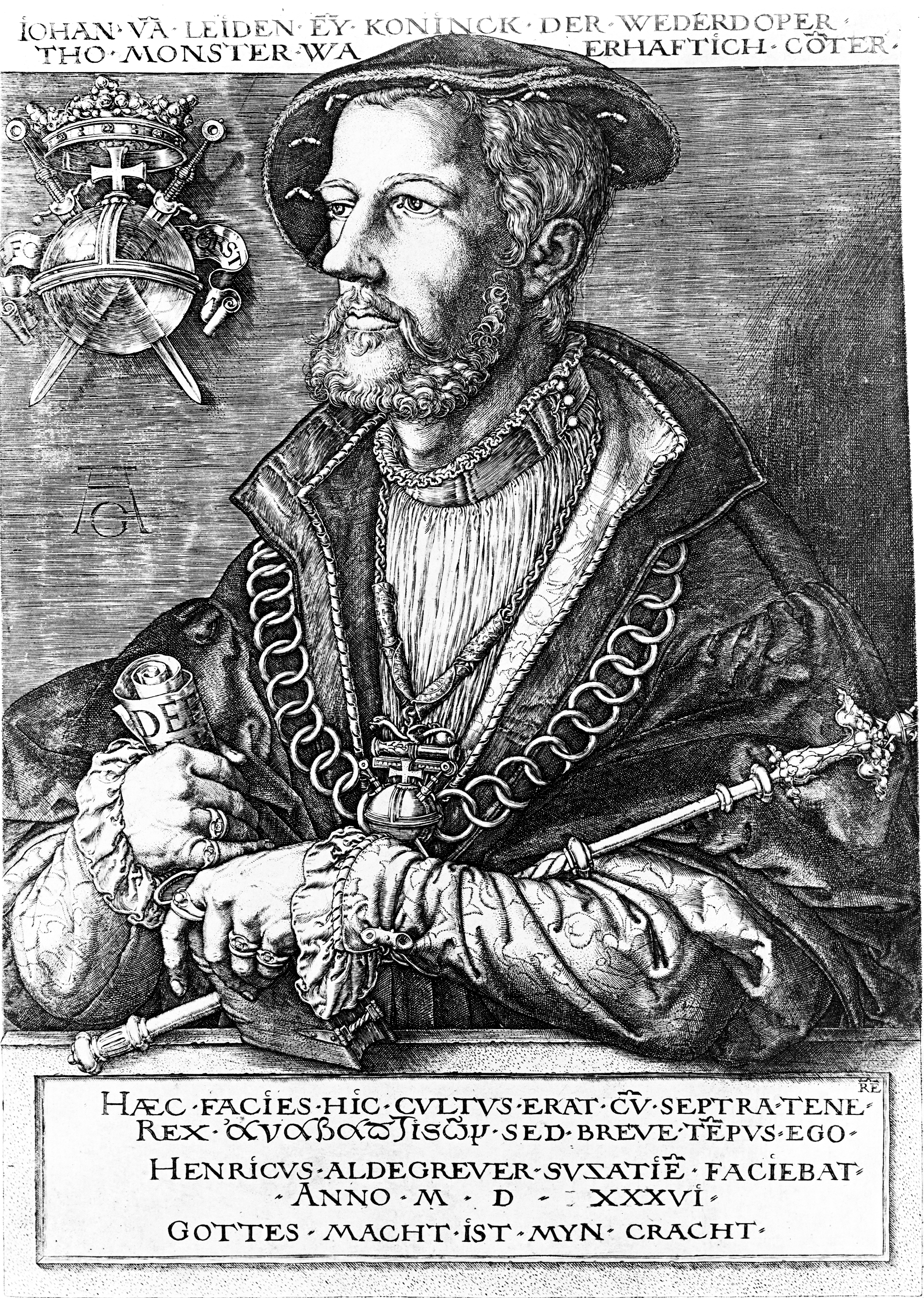
John of Leiden

- January 2 – Henry of Stolberg, German nobleman (d. 1572)
- January 3 – Gian Girolamo Albani, Italian Catholic cardinal (d. 1591)
- January 25 – Giovanni Morone, Italian Catholic cardinal (d. 1580)
- February 2 – John of Leiden, Dutch Anabaptist leader (d. 1536)
- February 10 – Vidus Vidius, Italian surgeon and anatomist (d. 1569)
- March 25 – Girolamo Dandini, Italian Cardinal
- March 27 – Wolrad II, Count of Waldeck-Eisenberg, German nobleman (d. 1578)
- April 23 – Afonso of Portugal, Portuguese Roman Catholic cardinal (d. 1540)
- July 4 – Magnus III of Mecklenburg-Schwerin, German Lutheran bishop of the Prince-Bishopric of Schwerin (d. 1550)
- July 10 – John Calvin, French religious reformer (d. 1564)
- July 25 – Philip II, Count of Nassau-Saarbrücken, German nobleman (d. 1554)
- August 3 – Étienne Dolet, French scholar and printer (d. 1546)
- August 7 – Joachim I, Prince of Anhalt-Dessau, German prince (d. 1561)
- August 25 – Ippolito II d'Este, Italian cardinal and statesman (d. 1572)
- October 20 – Arthur Stewart, Duke of Rothesay, Scottish prince (d. 1510)
- November 4 – John, Duke of Münsterberg-Oels, Polish-German nobleman (d. 1565)
- November 7 – Bernardino Telesio, Italian philosopher and natural scientist (d. 1588)

=== Date unknown ===
- Anneke Esaiasdochter, Dutch Anabaptist (d. 1539)
- Élie Vinet, French humanist (d. 1587)
- François de Scépeaux, French governor (d. 1571)
- François Douaren, French jurist (d. 1559)
- Gonzalo Jiménez de Quesada, Spanish conquistador (d. 1579)
- Guillaume Le Testu, French privateer (d. 1573)
- John Erskine of Dun, Scottish religious reformer (d. 1591)
- Naoe Kagetsuna, Japanese Clan Officer (d. 1577)
- Stanisław Odrowąż, Polish nobleman (d. 1545)

== Deaths ==
1500

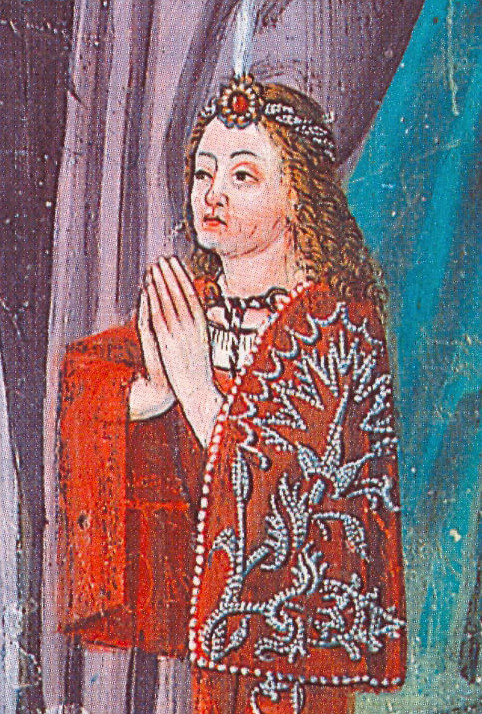
Leonhard of Gorizia

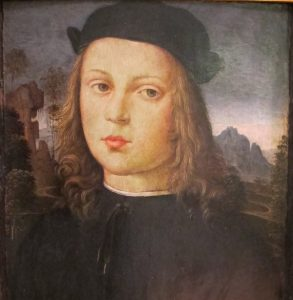
Alfonso of Aragon

=== January–June ===
- February 17 – William III, Landgrave of Hesse (b. 1471)
- April 10 – Michael Tarchaniota Marullus, Greek scholar, poet and soldier (b. c. 1453)
- April 12 – Leonhard of Gorizia, Count of Gorz (b. 1440)
- May 29
  - Bartolomeu Dias, Portuguese explorer (b. c. 1450)
  - Thomas Rotherham, English cleric and minister (b. 1423)
- June 19 – Edmund Tudor, Duke of Somerset, English nobleman (b. 1499)
- June 23 – Lodovico Lazzarelli, Italian poet (b. 1447)

=== July–December ===
- July 14 – Íñigo López de Mendoza y Luna, 2nd Duke of the Infantado, Spanish noble (b. 1438)
- July 19 – Miguel da Paz, Prince of Portugal (b. 1498)
- August 18 – Alfonso of Aragon, prince (b. 1481)
- August 26 – Philipp I, Count of Hanau-Münzenberg, German noble (b. 1449)
- August 30 – Victor, Duke of Münsterberg and Opava, Count of Glatz (b. 1443)
- September 12 – Albert III, Duke of Saxony (b. 1443)
- September 15 – John Morton, English Archbishop of Canterbury (b. c. 1420)
- October 1 – John Alcock, English Bishop of Ely (b. c. 1430)
- October 21 – Emperor Go-Tsuchimikado of Japan (b. 1442)
- November 13 – Philip, Prince of Anhalt-Köthen, German prince (b. 1468)
- date unknown – Antonia of Savoy, Lady Consort of Monaco

Probable

- Juan Pérez de Gijón, Spanish composer (b. 1460)
- Stefano Infessura, Italian humanist writer (b. c. 1435)
- Fyodor Kuritsyn, Russian statesman, philosopher and poet
- Nyai Gede Pinateh, Javanese merchant (b. c. 1450)

1501

=== January–June ===
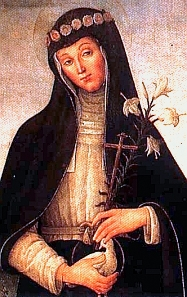
Blessed Columba of Rieti

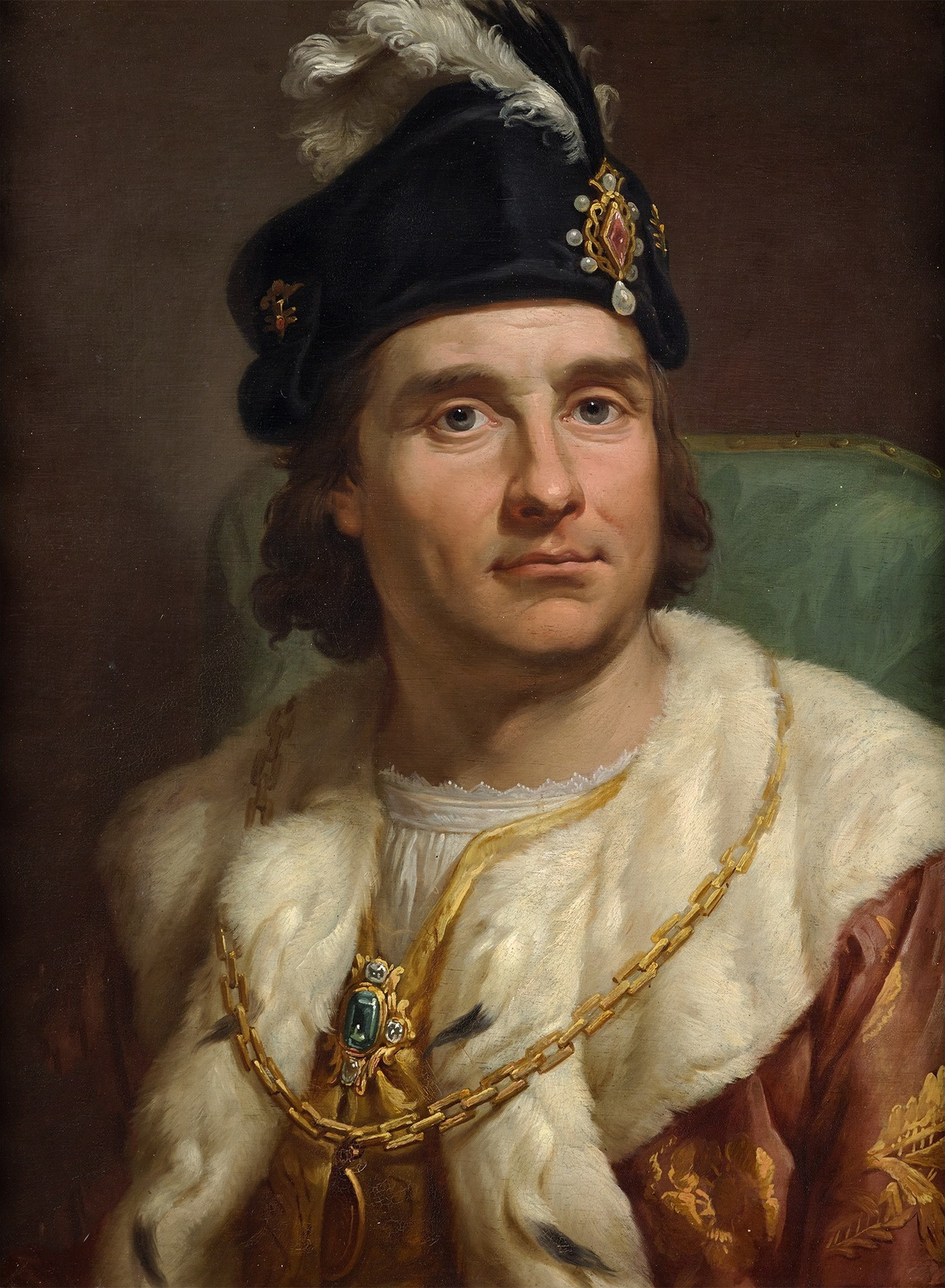
John I Albert

- January 3 – Ali-Shir Nava'i, Central Asian poet, politician and writer (b. 1441)
- January 5 – John Dynham, 1st Baron Dynham, English baron and Lord High Treasurer (b. 1433)
- January 25 – Margaret of Bavaria, Electress Palatine, Princess of Bavaria-Landshut (b. 1456)
- February 1 – Sigismund, Duke of Bavaria, German noble (b. 1439)
- March 4 – Thihathura II of Ava (b. 1474)
- April – John Doget, English diplomat
- April 7 – Minkhaung II, king of Ava (b. 1446)
- April 23 – Domenico della Rovere, Italian Catholic cardinal (b. 1442)
- May 3 – John Devereux, 9th Baron Ferrers of Chartley, English baron (b. 1463)
- May 7 – Giovanni Battista Zeno, Italian Catholic cardinal
- May 20 – Columba of Rieti, Italian Dominican tertiary Religious Sister and blessed (b. 1467)
- June 8 – George Gordon, 2nd Earl of Huntly, Earl of Huntly and Lord Chancellor of Scotland (b. 1440)
- June 17 – John I Albert of Poland (b. 1459)

=== July–December ===
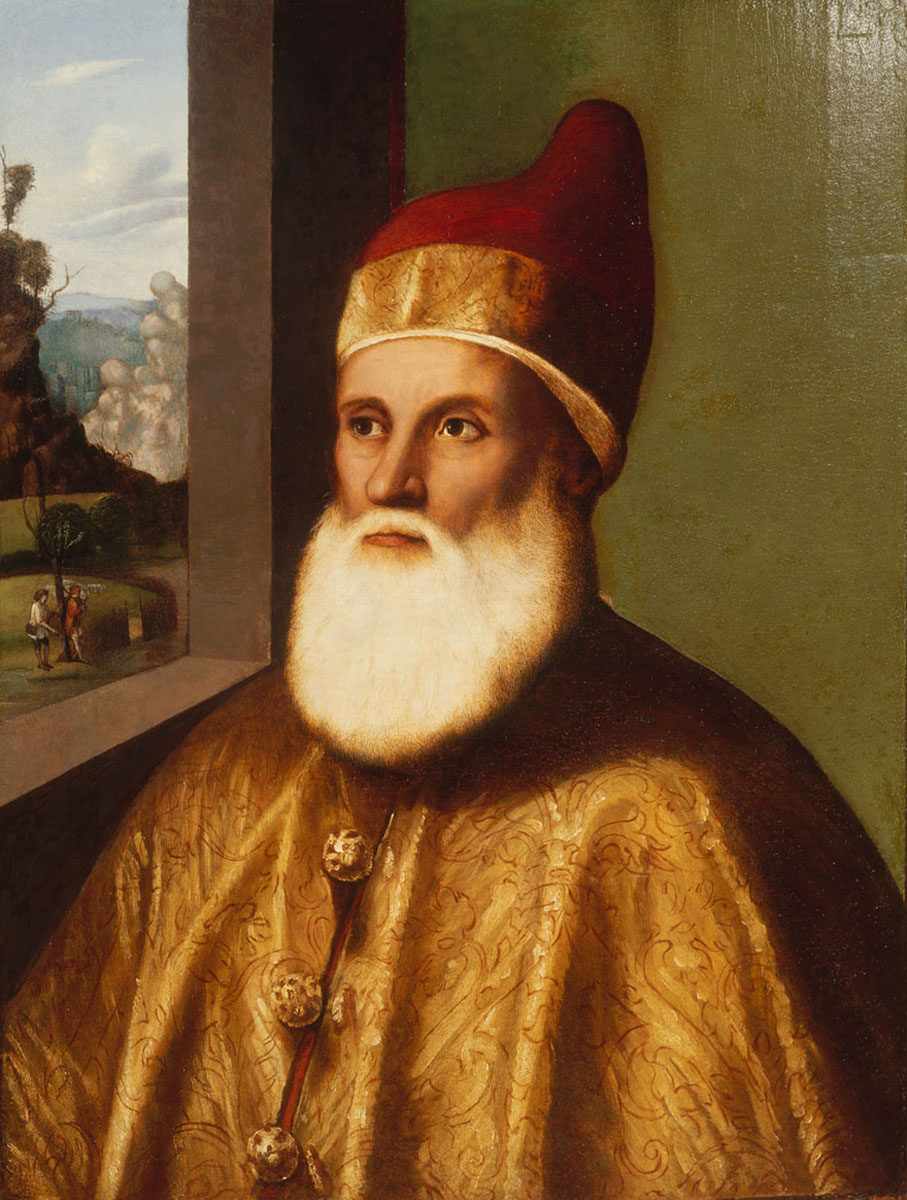
Agostino Barbarigo

- August 15 – Constantine Lascaris, Greek scholar and grammarian
- September 20
  - Agostino Barbarigo, Doge of Venice
  - Thomas Grey, 1st Marquess of Dorset, stepson of Edward IV of England (b. 1457)
- September 26 – Džore Držić, Croatian poet and playwright (b. 1461)
- September 29 – Andrew Stewart, Scottish bishop (b. 1442)
- November 19 – Amalia of Saxony, Duchess of Bavaria-Landshut (b. 1436)
- probable – Gaspar Corte-Real, Portuguese explorer (b. 1450)

1502

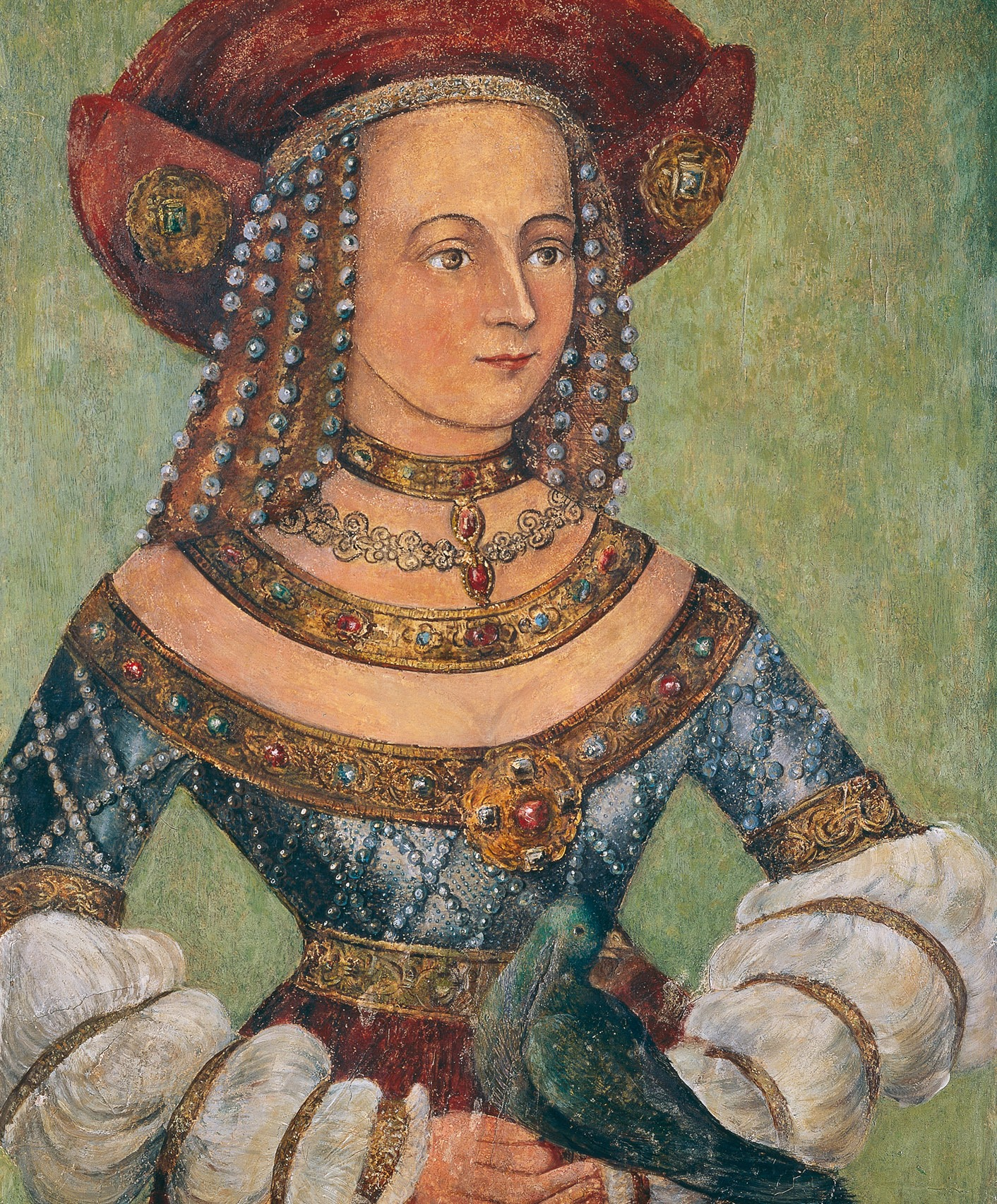
Hedwig Jagiellon, Duchess of Bavaria

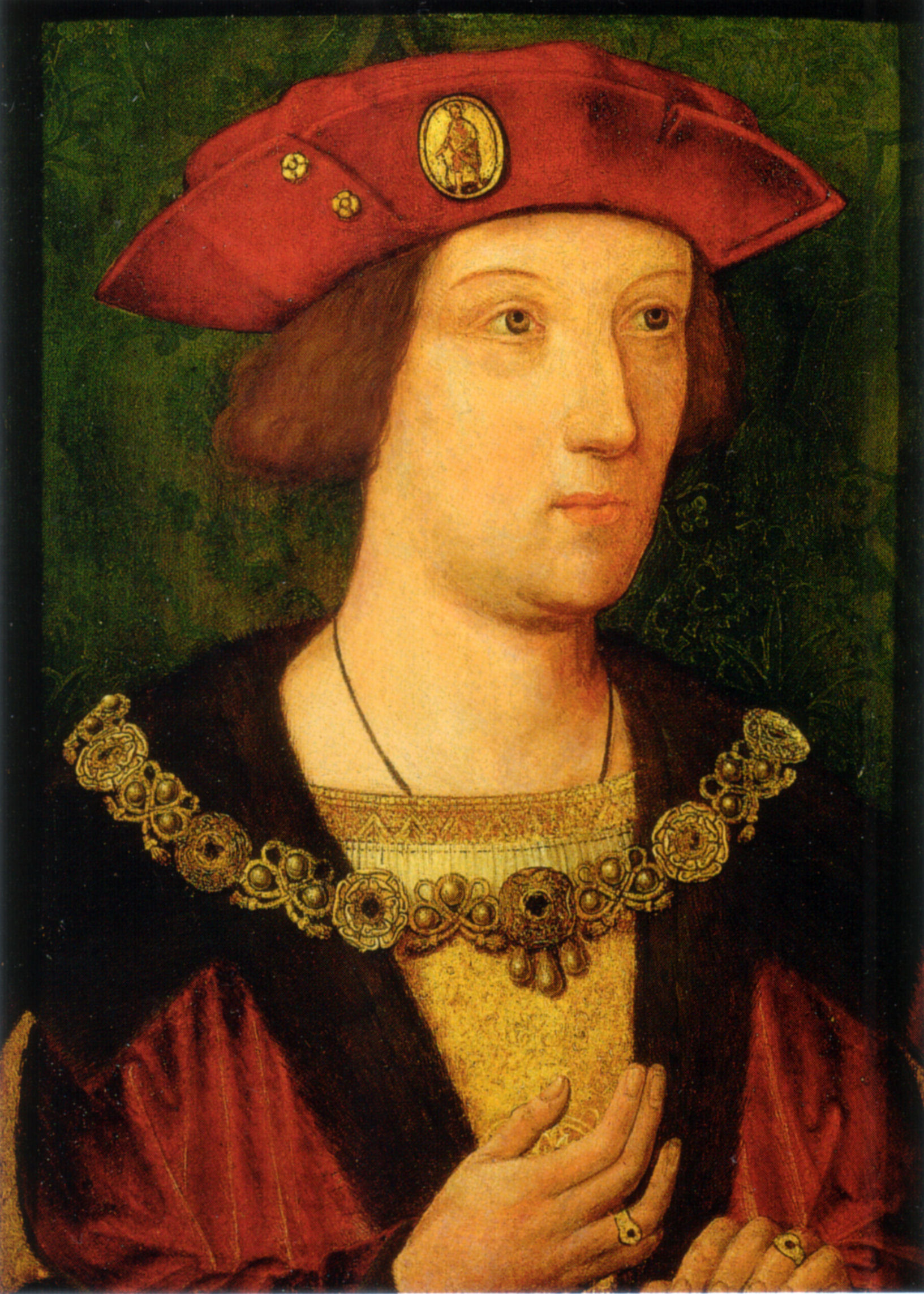
Arthur, Prince of Wales

=== January–June ===
- February 18 – Hedwig Jagiellon, Duchess of Bavaria (b. 1457)
- March – Francesco Laurana, Dalmatian-born sculptor (b. c. 1430)
- March 2 – Jan I Carondelet, Burgundian jurist and politician (b. 1428)
- April 2 – Arthur, Prince of Wales, English prince, eldest son of Henry VII of England (b. 1486)
- April 15 – John IV of Chalon-Arlay, Prince of Orange (1475–1502) (b. 1443)
- April 20 – Mary of Looz-Heinsberg, Dutch noble (b. 1424)
- May 4 – Berthold II of Landsberg, Bishop of Verden (1470–1502) and Hildesheim (1481–1502) (b. 1464)
- May 6 – James Tyrrell, English knight, alleged murderer of the princes in the Tower (executed) (b. c. 1450)
- June 9 – Astorre III Manfredi, Italian noble (b. 1485)

=== July–December ===
- July 15 – Luka Radovanović, Catholic priest (b. 1425)
- August 18 – Knut Alvsson, Norwegian nobleman and politician (b. 1455)
- August 31 – Thomas Wode, Lord Chief Justice of the Common Pleas
- September 1 – Sōgi, Japanese Buddhist priest and poet (b. 1421)
- October 14 – Diego Hurtado de Mendoza y Quiñones, Spanish noble (b. 1444)
- November 10 – George I of Münsterberg, Imperial Prince, Duke of Münsterberg and Oels, Graf von Glatz (b. 1470)
- November 13 – Annio da Viterbo, Italian Dominican friar and scholar (b. 1432)
- December 31
  - Oliverotto Euffreducci, Italian politician (b. 1475)
  - Vitellozzo Vitelli, Italian condottiero (b. c. 1458)
- date unknown
  - Ahuitzotl, Aztec ruler of Tenochtitlan
  - Giustina Rocca, Italian Renaissance lawyer, judge and diplomat
  - Octavien de Saint-Gelais, French churchman, poet and translator (b. 1468)
  - Gwerful Mechain, Welsh erotic poet (b. c. 1460?)

1503

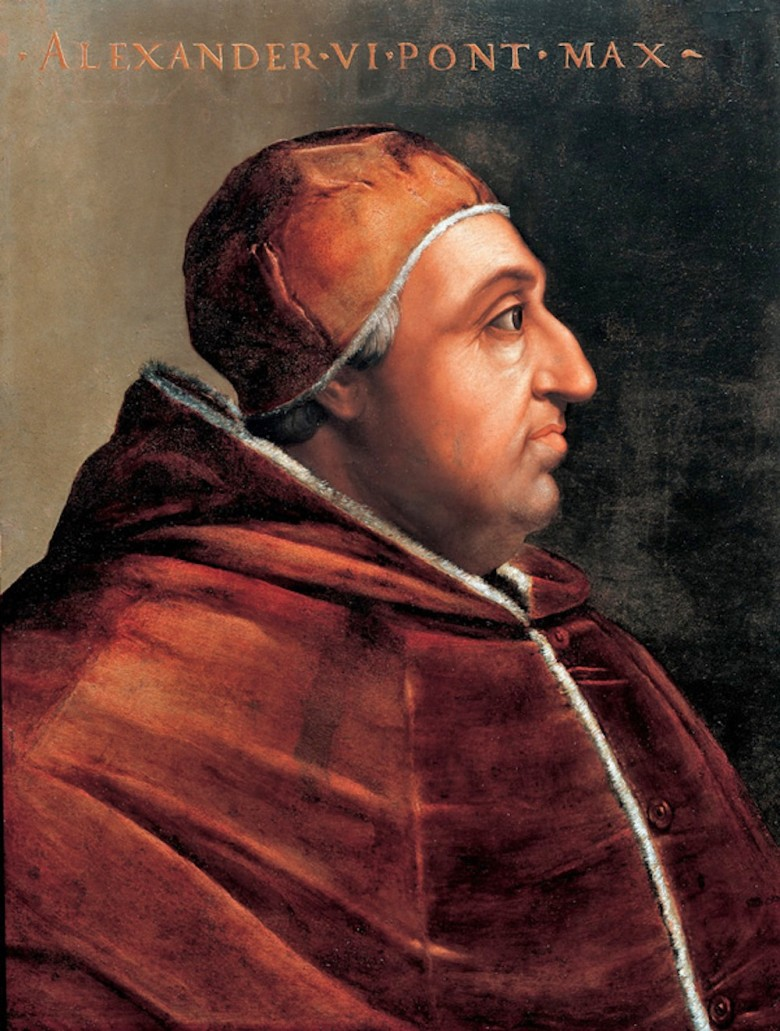
Pope Alexander VI

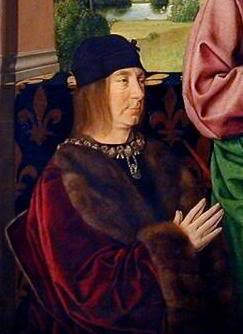
Peter II, Duke of Bourbon

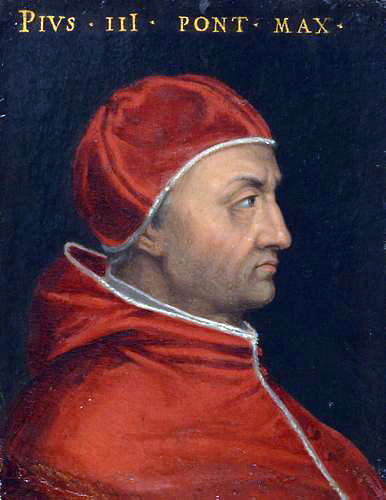
Pope Pius III

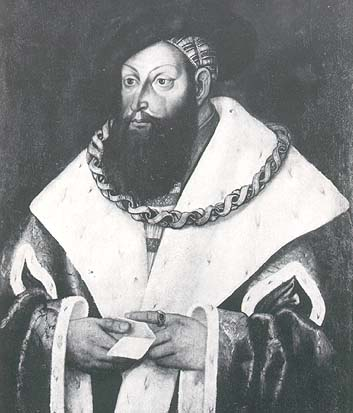
George, Duke of Bavaria

- January 20 – Ludmila of Poděbrady, Regent of the duchies of Brzeg and Oława (1488–1503) (b. 1456)
- February 11 – Elizabeth of York, queen of Henry VII of England (b. 1466)
- February 23 – Annamacharya, Indian mystic saint composer (b. 1408)
- March 14 – Frederick Jagiellon, Primate of Poland (b. 1468)
- March 16 – Edward Story, Bishop of Carlisle and Chichester
- April 7 – Sophia Palaiologina, Byzantine princess and Grand Princess of Moscow (b. 1449)
- May 20 – Lorenzo di Pierfrancesco de' Medici, Italian patron of the arts (b. 1463)
- June 2 – Clara Gonzaga, Italian noble (b. 1464)
- July 3 – Pierre d'Aubusson, Grand Master of the Knights of Rhodes (b. 1423)
- July 12 – Sophie of Mecklenburg, Duchess of Mecklenburg, Duchess of Saxony (b. 1481)
- July 24 – Louise of Savoy, Nun (b. 1461)
- August 5 – Reginald Bray, British courtier (b. 1440)
- August 12 – Anna Jagiellon, Duchess of Pomerania, Polish princess (b. 1476)
- August 18 – Pope Alexander VI (b. 1431)
- September 5 – Margaret of Hanau-Münzenberg, German noblewoman (b. 1471)
- October 10 – Peter II, Duke of Bourbon (b. 1438)
- October 18 – Pope Pius III (b. c. 1439)
- November 17 – Bona of Savoy, Duchess of Savoy (b. 1449)
- November 23 – Margaret of York, Duchess consort of Burgundy, spouse of Charles I, Duke of Burgundy (b. 1446)
- December 1 – George, Duke of Bavaria (b. 1455)
- December 14 – Sten Sture the Elder, regent of Sweden (1470–1497 and 1501–1503) (b. 1440)
- December 28 – Piero di Lorenzo de' Medici, exiled ruler of Florence (drowned) (b. 1472)
- date unknown
  - Richard Amerike, English merchant and patron of John Cabot (b. 1445)
  - Anacaona, Taino queen and poet (b. 1474)

1504

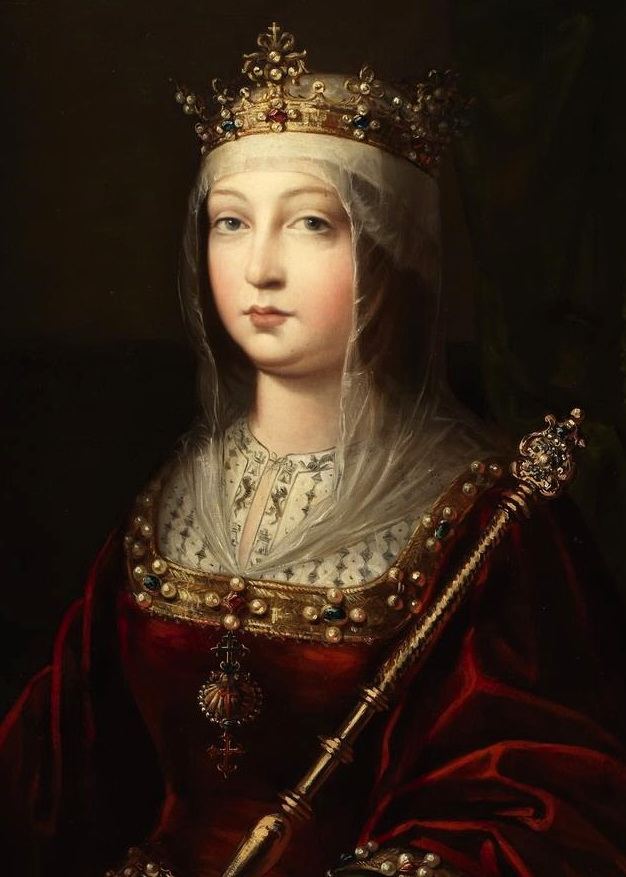
Isabella I of Castile

- January 9 – Gaspare Nadi, Italian builder (b. 1418)
- January 27 – Marquess Ludovico II of Saluzzo (b. 1438)
- February 17 – Eberhard II, Duke of Württemberg (b. 1447)
- April 15 – Filippino Lippi, Italian painter (b. 1457)
- May 31 – Engelbert II of Nassau (b. 1451)
- June – Lê Hiến Tông, Emperor of the Lê Dynasty
- June 19 – Bernhard Walther, German astronomer and humanist (b. 1430)
- July 2 – Stephen the Great, Prince of Moldova (b. 1434)
- July 29 – Thomas Stanley, 1st Earl of Derby (b. 1435)
- August 15 or August 18 – Domenico Maria Novara da Ferrara, Italian astronomer (b. 1454)
- August 20 – Ruprecht of the Palatinate (bishop of Freising) (b. 1481)
- August 22 – Philipp II, Count of Hanau-Lichtenberg (1489–1503) (b. 1462)
- August 28 – John Paston, English gentleman known from the Paston Letters (b. 1444)
- September 10 – Duke Philibert II of Savoy (b. 1480)
- September 15 – Elisabeth of Bavaria (b. 1478)
- September 22 – Jan II the Mad, Duke of Żagań (1439–1449 and 1461–1468 and again in 1472) (b. 1435)
- September 24 – Bartolomeo della Rocca ("Cocles"), Italian astrologer (b. 1467)
- October 12 – John Corvinus, Hungarian noble (b. 1473)
- November 9 – King Frederick IV of Naples (b. 1452)
- November 26 – Queen Isabella I of Castile (b. 1451)
- December – Lê Túc Tông, Emperor of the Lê Dynasty
- December 21 – Berthold von Henneberg, German archbishop and elector (b. 1442)
- date unknown
  - Abdal-Karim Khan Astrakhani, Khan of Astrakhan
  - Abu Abdallah IV, Sultan of Tlemcen
  - Abu Abd Allah al-Sheikh Muhammad ibn Yahya, first Wattasid Sultan of Morocco and King of Fez
  - Éamonn Mág Samhradháin, Lord of Tullyhaw
  - Fathullah Imad-ul-Mulk, Indian-born founder of the Berar Sultanate
  - Qasim Barid I, founder of the Bidar Sultanate
  - Vira Ravi Ravi Varma, Raja of Venad
  - Choe Bu, Korean official and venturer to China (b. 1454)

1505

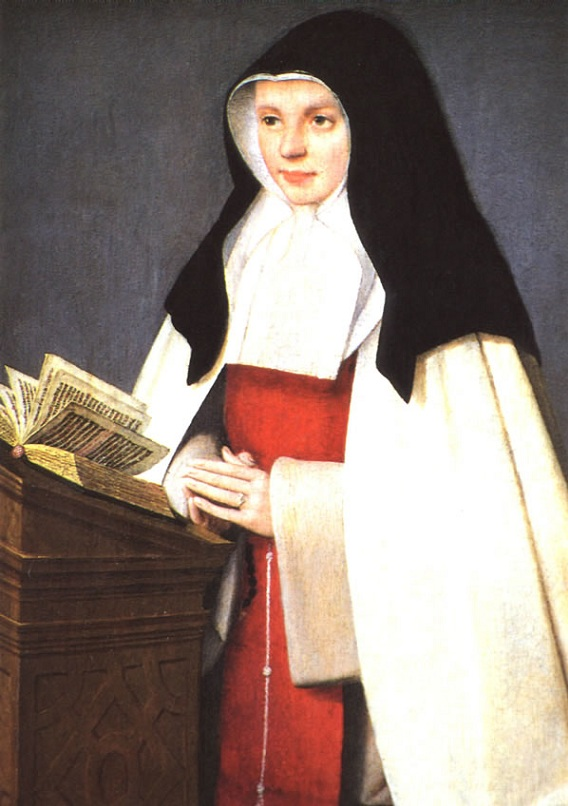
Saint Jeanne de Valois

Emperor Hongzhi

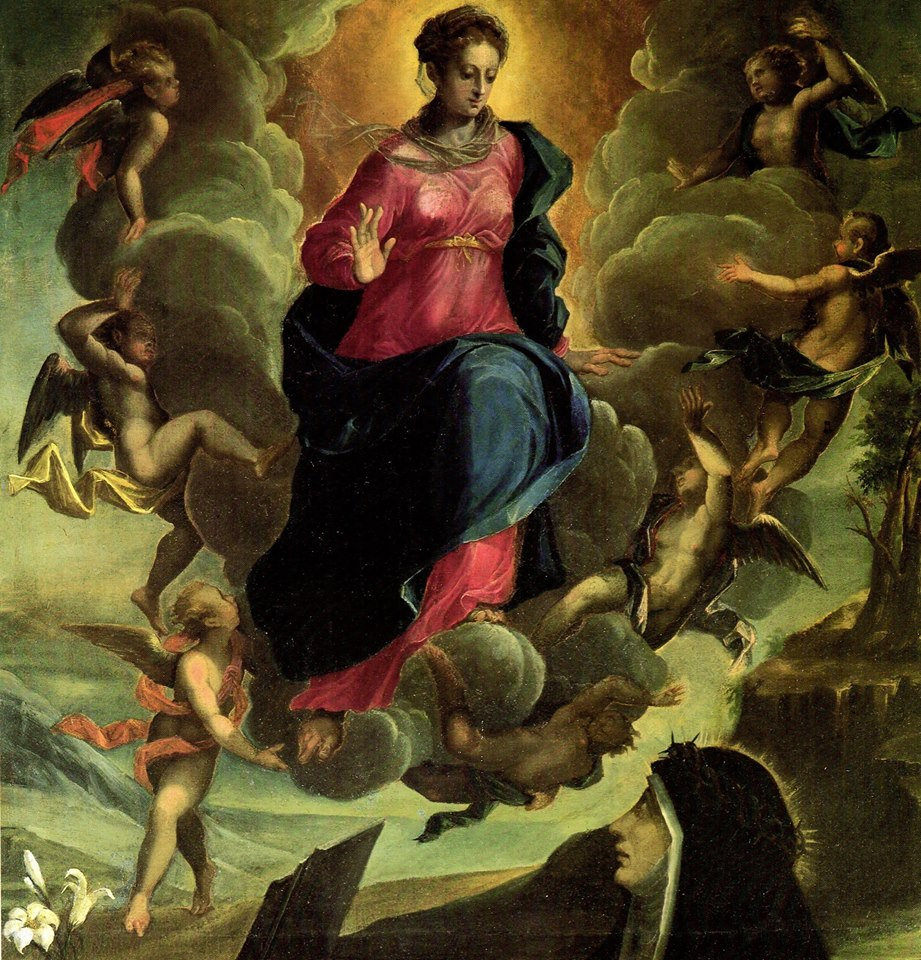
Blessed Osanna of Mantua

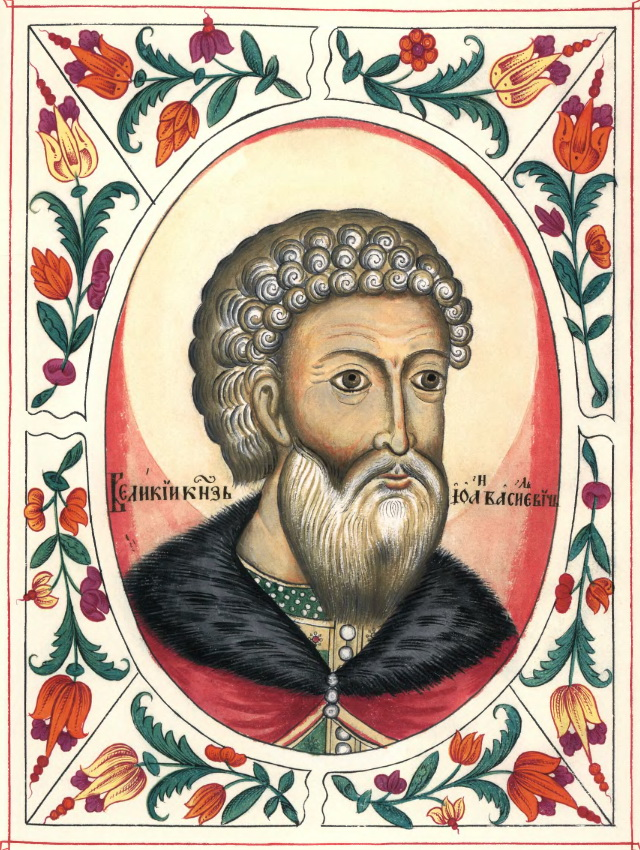
Ivan III of Russia

- January 25 – Ercole I d'Este, Duke of Ferrara, Italian politician (b. 1431)
- February 4 – Jeanne de Valois, French princess, Roman Catholic nun and saint (b. 1464)
- February 19 – Matilda of Hesse, German noblewoman (b. 1473)
- February 20 – Arvid Trolle, Swedish politician (b. 1440)
- March 5 – Philip of Cleves, Bishop of Nevers, Amiens, Autun (b. 1467)
- March 29 – Sidonie of Bavaria, eldest daughter of Duke Albrecht IV of Bavaria-Munich (b. 1488)
- April 23 – Muhammad Jaunpuri, Indian-born religious leader (b. 1443)
- May 28 – Ascanio Sforza, Italian Roman Catholic cardinal (b. 1455)
- June 8 – Hongzhi Emperor of China (b. 1470)
- June 18 – Osanna of Mantua, Italian Dominican tertiary and blessed (b. 1449)
- July – Jacob Obrecht, Flemish composer (plague) (b. 1457)
- October 27 – Emperor Ivan III of Russia (b. 1440)
- date unknown
  - Adam of Fulda, German music writer (b. c. 1445)
  - Heinrich Kramer, German churchman and inquisitor (b. 1430)

1506

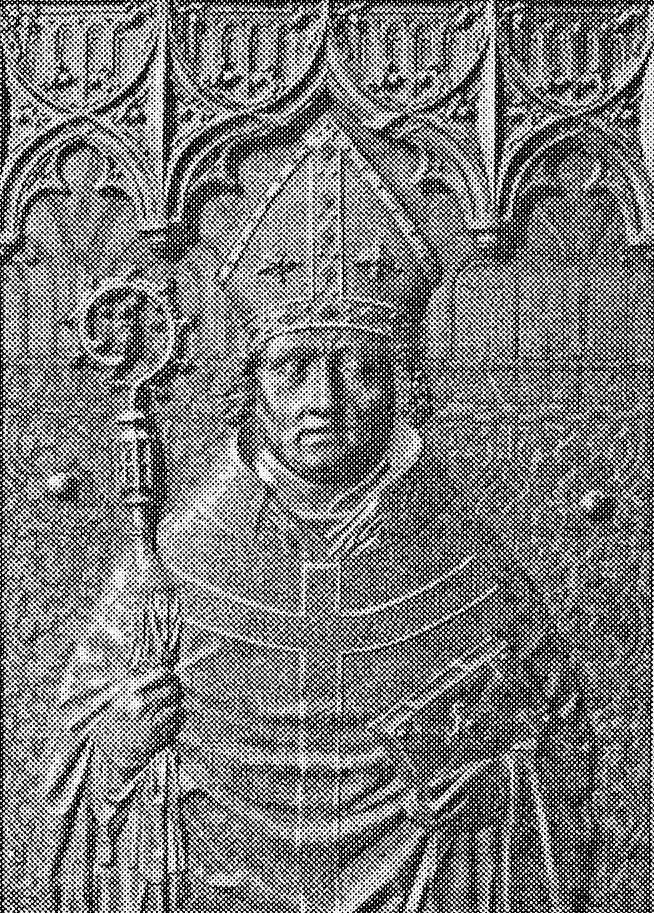
Johann IV Roth

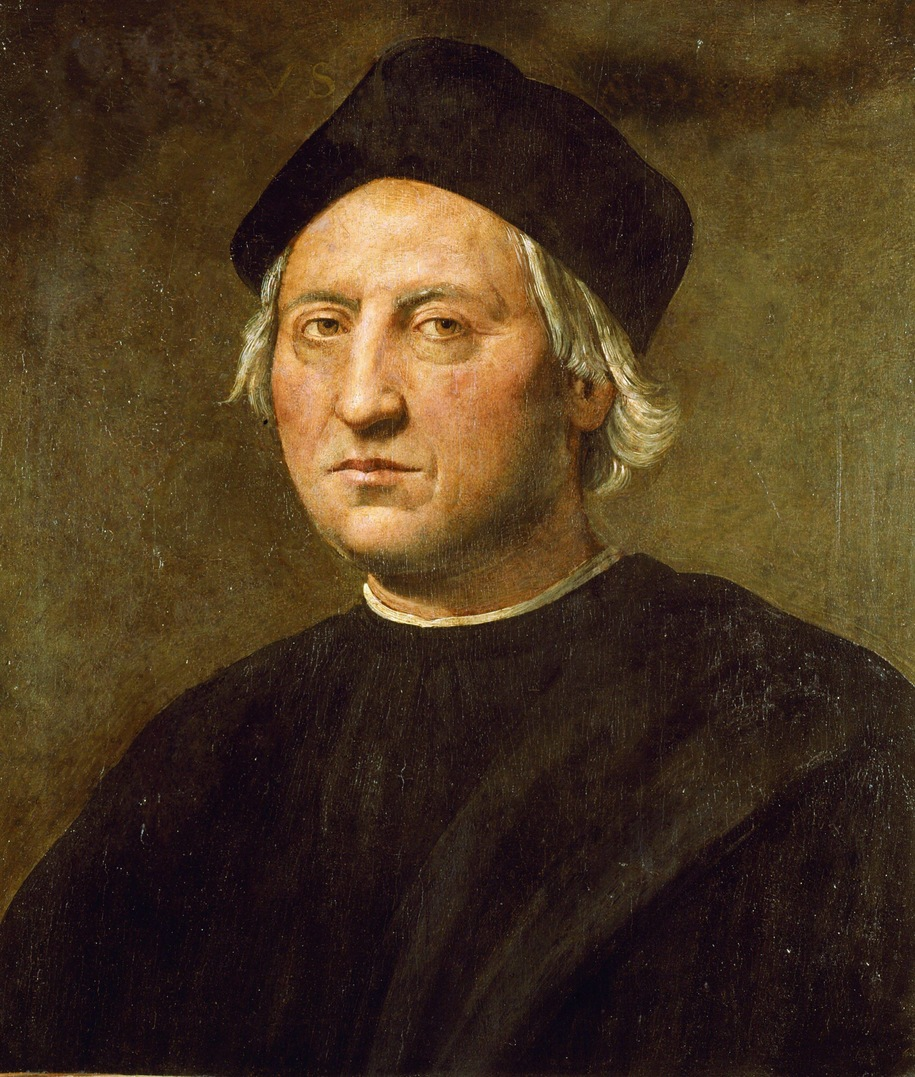
Christopher Columbus

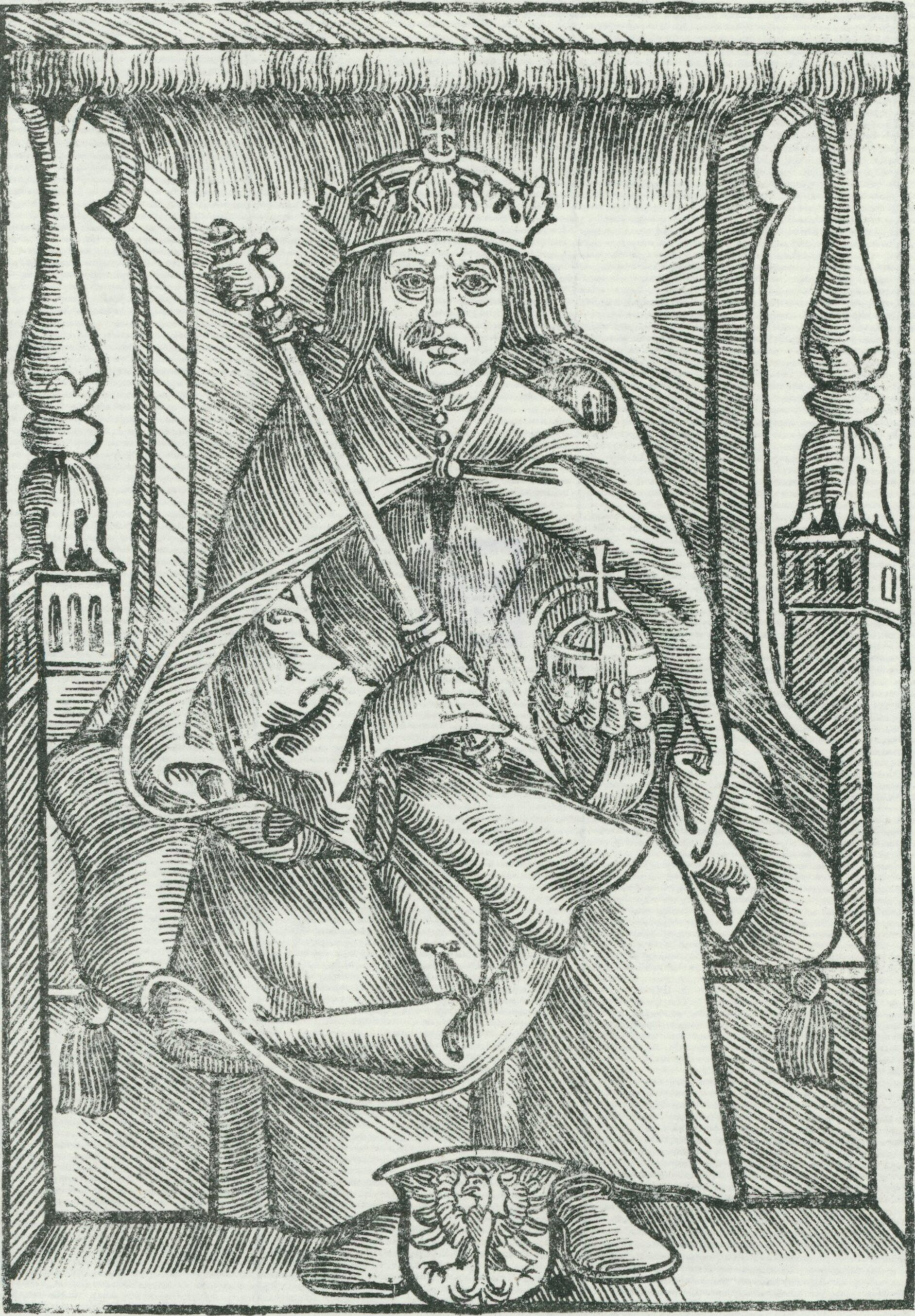
King Alexander Jagiellon of Poland

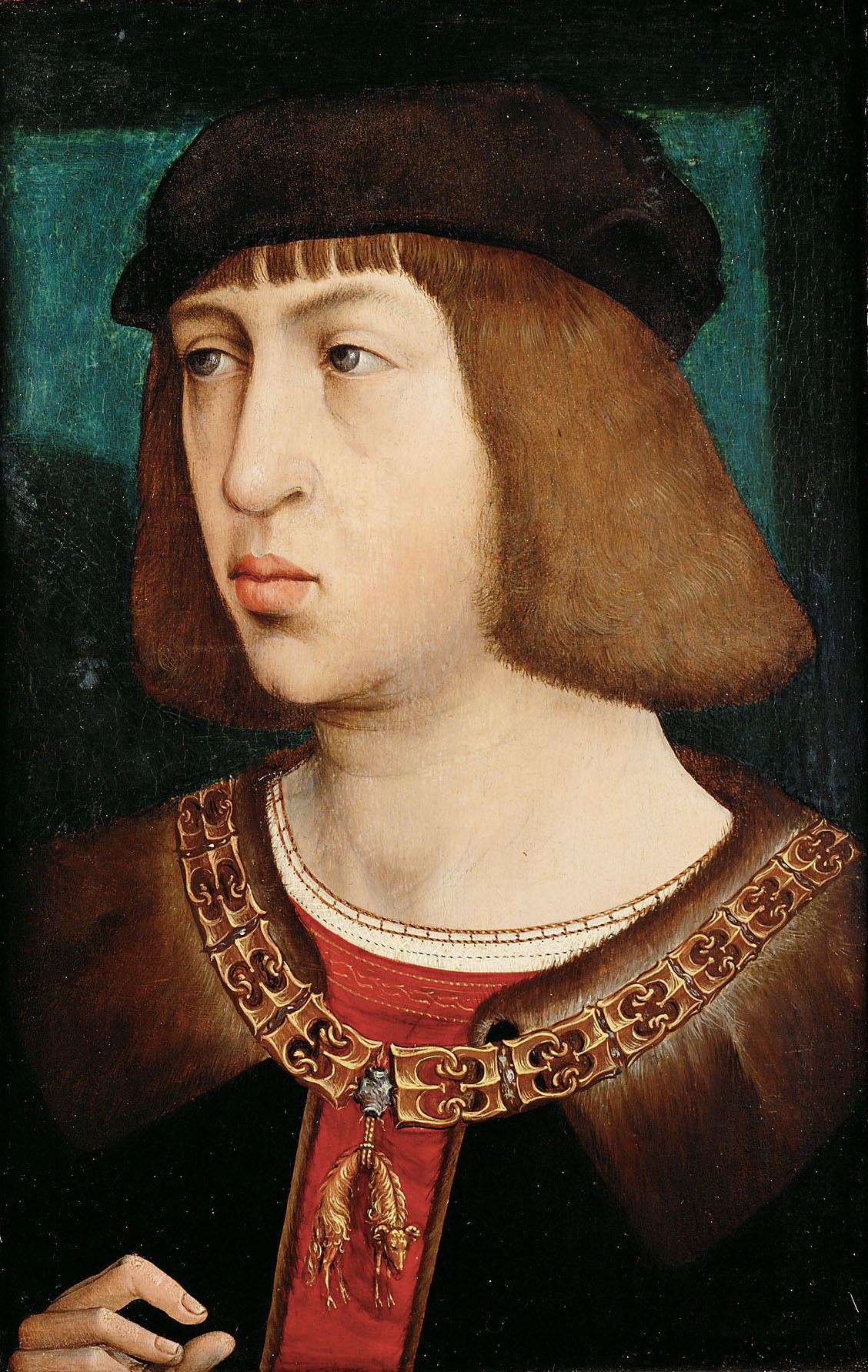
King Philip the Handsome of Castile

- January 21 – Johann IV Roth, German Roman Catholic bishop (b. 1426)
- May 4 – Sultan Husayn Mirza Bayqara, Timurid ruler of Herat (b. 1438)
- May 20 – Christopher Columbus, Italian explorer (b. c.1451)
- August 15 – Alexander Agricola, Flemish composer (b. c. 1445)
- August 19 – King Alexander Jagiellon of Poland (b. 1461)
- September 13 – Andrea Mantegna, Italian painter and engraver (b. 1432)
- September 25 – King Philip the Handsome of Castile (b. 1478)
- September 30 – Beatrice, Duchess of Viseu, Portuguese infante (b. 1430)
- November 8 – Edward Hastings, 2nd Baron Hastings, English noble (b. 1466)
- November 20 – Yeonsangun of Joseon, king of Korean Joseon Dynasty (b. 1476)
- November 21 – Engelbert, Count of Nevers, younger son of John I (b. 1462)
- date unknown – Mihri Hatun, Ottoman poet

1507

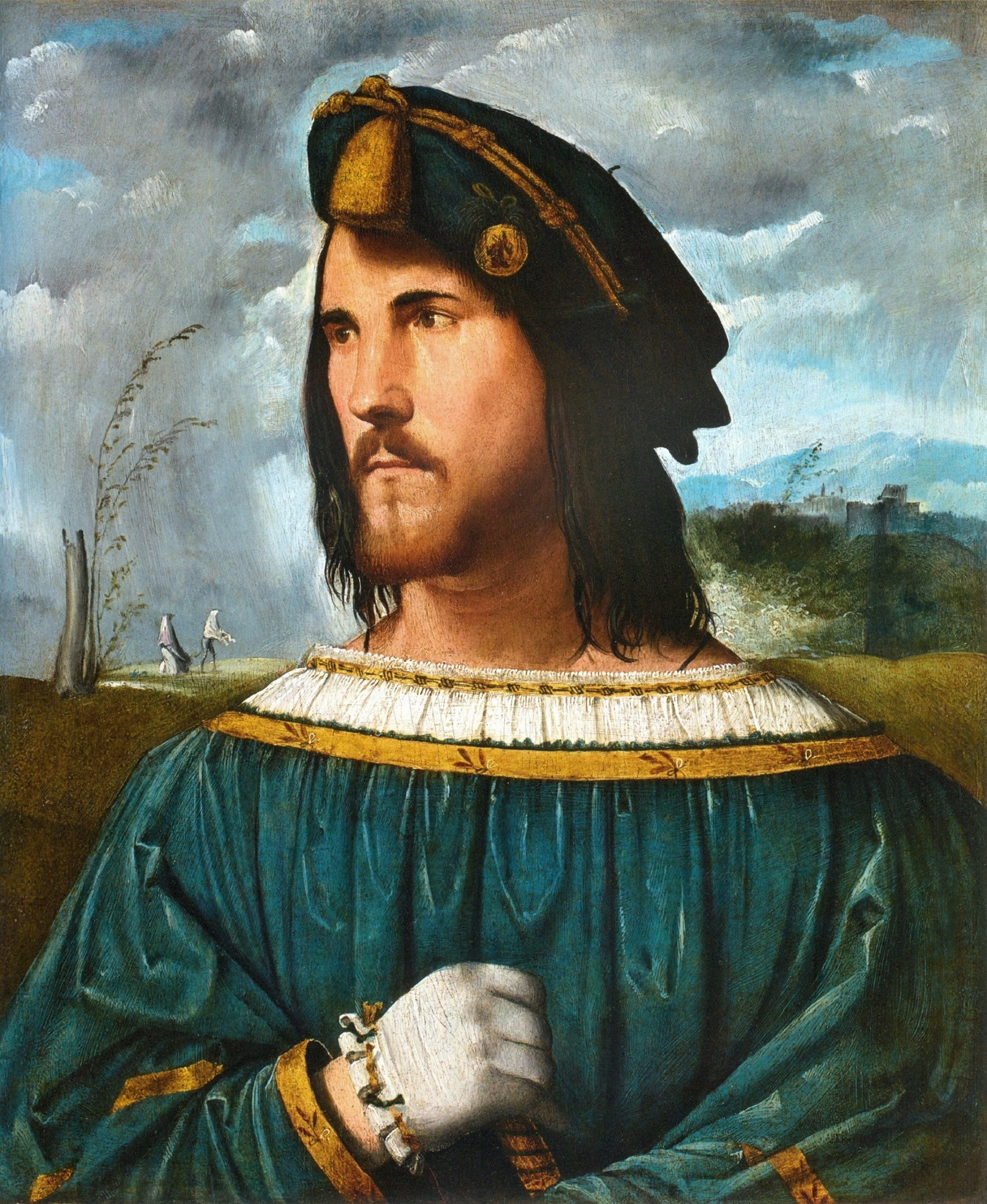
Portrait of a Gentleman (Cesare Borgia)

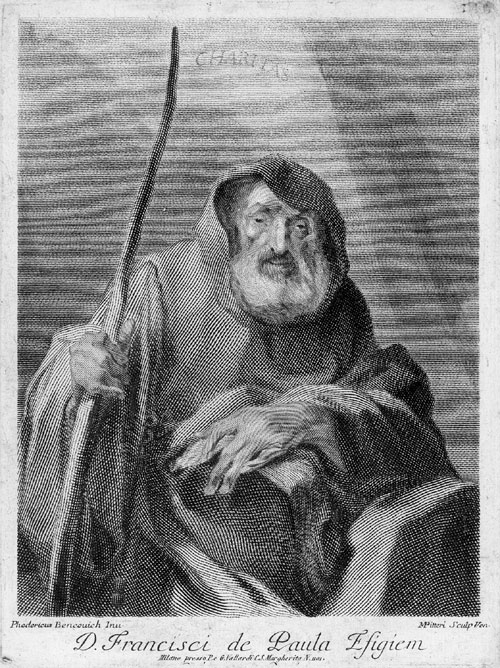
Saint Francis of Paola

- January 17 – Henry IV of Neuhaus (b. 1442)
- March 12 – Cesare Borgia, Italian general and statesman. (b. 1475)
- March 21 – Jan Feliks "Szram" Tarnowski, Polish nobleman (b. 1471)
- April 1 – Sigismondo d'Este, Italian nobleman (b. 1433)
- April 2 – Francis of Paola, Italian founder of the Order of the Minims (b. 1416)
- July 5 – Crinitus, Italian humanist (b. 1475)
- July 8 – Anna Notaras, Byzantine noblewoman (b. 1436)
- July 29 – Martin Behaim, German navigator and geographer (b. 1459)
- August 15 – John V, Duke of Saxe-Lauenburg (b. 1439)
- August 23 – Jean Molinet, French writer (b. 1435)
- August 24 – Cecily of York, English princess (b. 1469)
- December – Ingeborg Tott, influential Swedish noblewoman, spouse of Swedish regent Sten Sture the elder
- Date unknown – Agnes Jónsdóttir, Icelandic abbess (b. year unknown)

1508

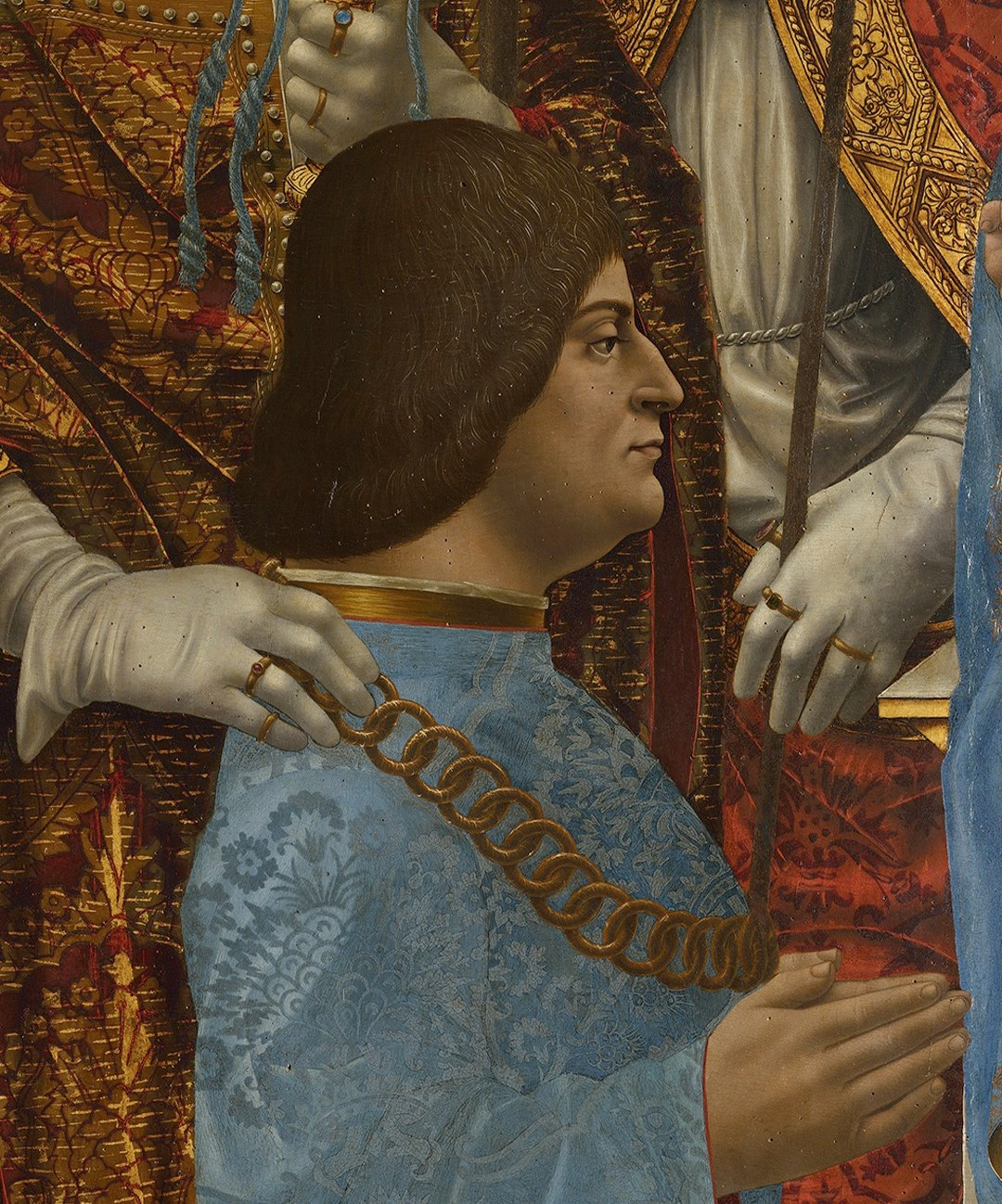
Ludovico Sforza

- February – Robert Lauder of the Bass, governor of Berwick-on-Tweed (b. c. 1440)
- February 4 – Conrad Celtes, German humanist (b. 1459)
- February 16 – Giovanni II Bentivoglio, tyrant of Bologna (b. 1443)
- February 27 – James, Duke of Rothesay, heir to the throne of Scotland (b. 1507)
- February 28 – Philip, Elector Palatine (b. 1448)
- March 18 – Albert IV, Duke of Bavaria (b. 1447)
- March – Lourenço de Almeida, Portuguese explorer
- April 10 – Guidobaldo da Montefeltro, Italian condottiero (b. 1472)
- May 21 – Giles Daubeney, 1st Baron Daubeney (b. 1451)
- May 27 – Ludovico Sforza, Duke of Milan (b. 1452)
- June 6 – Ercole Strozzi, Italian poet (b. 1473)
- June 15 – Bernard Stewart, 4th Lord of Aubigny (b. c. 1452)
- July 28 or July 29 – Robert Blackadder, Bishop of Glasgow
- July 31 – Na'od, Emperor of Ethiopia (in battle)
- August 3 – Raphael de Mercatellis, abbot and bibliophile (b. 1437)
- September 23 – Beatrice of Naples, queen consort of Hungary (b. 1457)
- October 10 – János Thurzó, Hungarian businessman (b. 1437)
- October 18 – Patrick Hepburn, 1st Earl of Bothwell, Lord High Admiral of Scotland
- October 23 – Edmund de Ros, 10th Baron de Ros, English politician (b. 1446)
- November 25 – Ursula of Brandenburg, Duchess of Münsterberg-Oels and Countess of Glatz (b. 1450)
- December 10 – René II, Duke of Lorraine (b. 1451)
- December 16 – Henry the Younger of Stolberg, Stadtholder of Friesland (1506–1508) (b. 1467)
- December 22 – Eric II, Duke of Mecklenburg (b. 1483)
- date unknown
  - Isaac Abravanel, Portuguese statesman, philosopher and theologian (b. 1437)
  - Mahmud Khan (Moghul Khan), Khan of Tashkent
  - Micheletto Corella, Valencian condottieri
  - Damkhat Reachea, emperor of Cambodia
  - Ahmad al-Wansharisi, North African Islamic jurist and theologian

1509

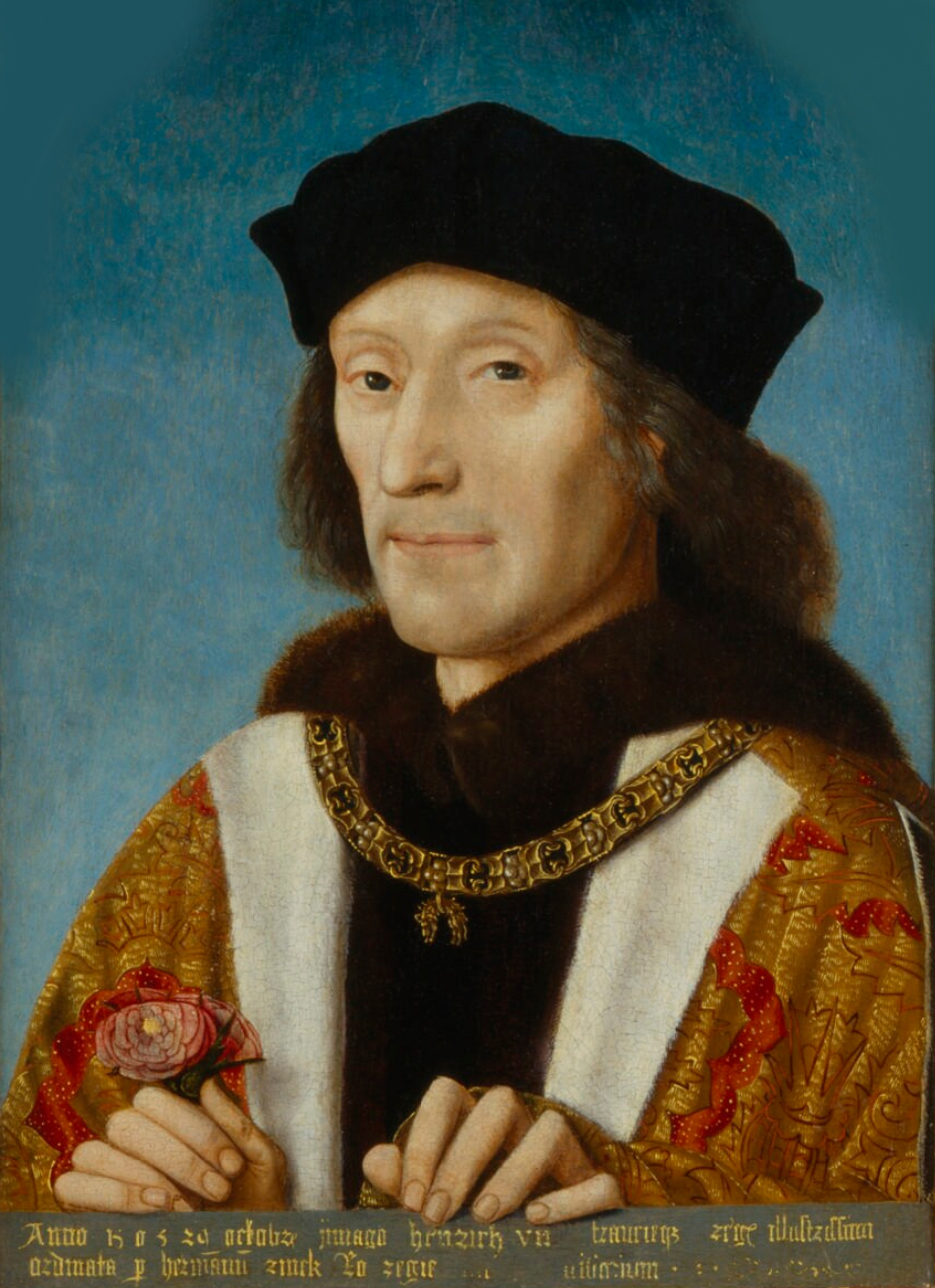
Henry VII of England

- January – Adam Kraft, German sculptor and architect (b. circa 1460)
- January 27 – John I, Count Palatine of Simmern, German nobleman (b. 1459)
- March 14 – Giovanni Antonio Sangiorgio, Italian cardinal (b. unknown)
- April 21 – Henry VII of England, King of England and Lord of Ireland (b. 1457)
- April 27 – Margaret of Brandenburg, German abbess of the Poor Clares monastery at Hof (b. 1453)
- May 28 – Caterina Sforza, Italian countess of Forlì (b. 1463)
- June 29 – Margaret Beaufort, Countess of Richmond and Derby, mother of Henry VII of England (b. 1443)
- July 11 – William II, Landgrave of Hesse, German nobleman (b. 1469)
- July 16
  - Joao da Nova, Portuguese explorer (b. 1460)
  - Mikalojus Radvila the Old, Lithuanian nobleman (b. circa 1450)
- July 28 – Ignatius Noah of Lebanon, Syriac Orthodox patriarch of Antioch (b. 1451).
- December 1 – Lê Uy Mục, 8th king of the later Lê Dynasty of Vietnam (b. 1488)

=== Date unknown ===
- Dmitry Ivanovich, Russian Grand Prince (b. 1483)
- Eleanor de Poitiers, Burgundian courter and writer (b. circa 1444)
- Hans Seyffer, German sculptor and woodcarver (b. circa 1460)
- Shen Zhou, Chinese painter (b. 1427)
- Viranarasimha Raya, Indian ruler of the Vijayanagar Empire (b. unknown)
