= 1475 =

1475 in various calendars
- Gregorian calendar: 1475; MCDLXXV
- Ab urbe condita: 2228
- Armenian calendar: 924; ԹՎ ՋԻԴ
- Assyrian calendar: 6225
- Balinese saka calendar: 1396–1397
- Bengali calendar: 881–882
- Berber calendar: 2425
- English Regnal year: 14 Edw. 4 – 15 Edw. 4
- Buddhist calendar: 2019
- Burmese calendar: 837
- Byzantine calendar: 6983–6984
- Chinese calendar: 甲午年 (Wood Horse); 4172 or 3965 — to — 乙未年 (Wood Goat); 4173 or 3966
- Coptic calendar: 1191–1192
- Discordian calendar: 2641
- Ethiopian calendar: 1467–1468
- Hebrew calendar: 5235–5236
- Hindu calendars
- Vikram Samvat: 1531–1532
- Shaka Samvat: 1396–1397
- Kali Yuga: 4575–4576
- Holocene calendar: 11475
- Igbo calendar: 475–476
- Iranian calendar: 853–854
- Islamic calendar: 879–880
- Japanese calendar: Bunmei 7 (文明７年)
- Javanese calendar: 1391–1392
- Julian calendar: 1475; MCDLXXV
- Korean calendar: 3808
- Minguo calendar: 437 before ROC 民前437年
- Nanakshahi calendar: 7
- Thai solar calendar: 2017–2018
- Tibetan calendar: ཤིང་ཕོ་རྟ་ལོ་ (male Wood-Horse); 1601 or 1220 or 448 — to — ཤིང་མོ་ལུག་ལོ་ (female Wood-Sheep); 1602 or 1221 or 449

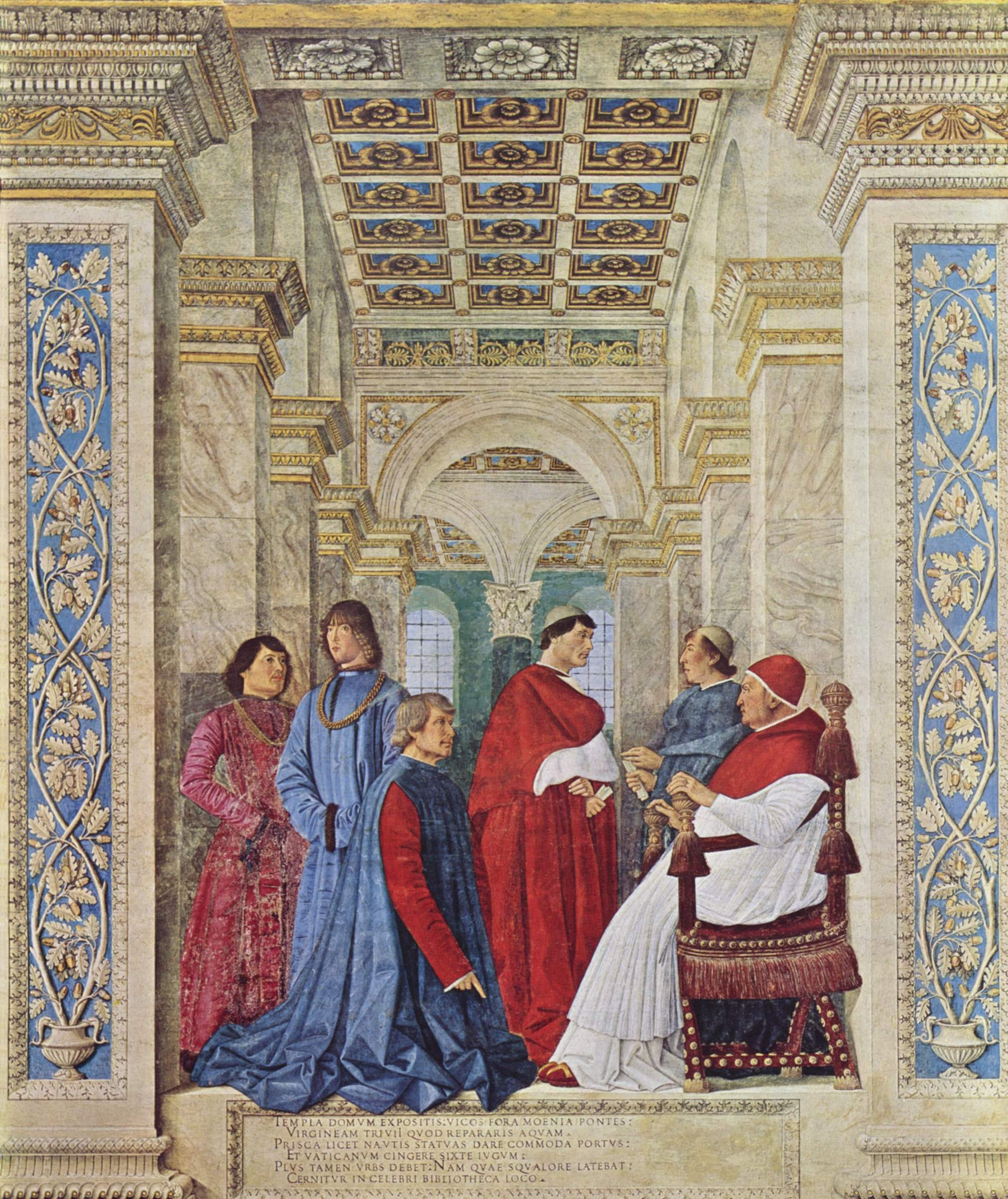
June 15: Pope Sixtus IV (right) creates the Vatican Library and appoints Bartolomeo Platina as its first librarian.

Year 1475 (MCDLXXV) was a common year starting on Sunday of the Julian calendar.

== Events ==
=== January–March ===
- January 10 – At the Battle of Vaslui during the Moldavian–Ottoman Wars, in what is now Romania, Stephen III of Moldavia leads his troops to defeat Ottoman invaders commanded by General Hadım Suleiman Pasha.
- January 15 – At Madrid, Queen Isabella I of Castile, who had been crowned on December 11, declares her husband Prince Fernando de Aragón to be the joint ruler with her, and is proclaimed as King Fernando V of Castile. Fernando, the oldest son and heir to the throne of King Juan II of Aragon, will make Isabella co-ruler of Aragon when he ascends the throne upon his father's death in 1479.
- January 30 – An alliance between the Duchy of Burgundy (ruled by Charles the Bold), the Duchy of Savoy (ruled by Filiberto the Hunter) and the Duchy of Milan (ruled by Galeazzo Maria Sforza) is created by the signing of a treaty at the city of Moncalieri, in Savoy near Turin.
- February 20 – The joint Spanish rulers of Castile and León, Queen Isabella and King Fernando, issue a decree of monetary reform at Segovia, setting a standard value for the real as 30 maravedí coins, and the dobla castellana as 870 maravedis.
- February 27 – At Racibórz (now in Poland, but at the time under the control of the Kingdom of Bohemia), the Bohemian King Matyáš Korvín arrests the Duke of Gliwice, Jan IV of Oświęcim and holds him prisoner until Jan relinquishes half of his lands to Bohemian control.
- March 10 – The city of Perpignan is recaptured by the army of the Kingdom of France after having been captured by the Spanish king John II of Aragon.
- March 14 – King Edward IV, gives royal assent to several acts passed by the English Parliament, including the Safe Conducts Act and the Wool Act.

=== April–June ===
- April 3 – While in Valladolid, capital of the Kingdom of Castile and León, to celebrate a tournament in their honor, the joint rulers of Castile, Queen Isabella and King Fernando II are interrupted by a messenger sent by King Afonso V of Portugal. King Afonso announces a declaration of war against the crown of Castile and León.
- May 10 – The War of the Castilian Succession begins as Portugal's army invades the Spanish kingdom of Castile and León with King Afonso of Portugal in command. The troops advance to the town of Plasencia, where King Afonso's fiancée Juana la Beltraneja (who claims to be the daughter of the late King Enrique IV of Castile) lives.
- May 25 – Having invaded Castile, King Afonso V of Portugal is betrothed to his first cousin, Juana la Beltraneja, Princess of Asturias, who had been identified on May 9, 1462, as heir to the Castilian throne as the daughter of King Enrique IV, and claims his right to rule the Kingdom of Castile and León. On May 30, Afonso and Juana then hold court at the small town of Toro for the former proclamation of themselves as joint rulers of Castile, an office held in the rest of the kingdom by Queen Isabella and King Fernando.
- June 15 – The Vatican Library in Rome is created by the papal bull Ad decorem militantis ecclesiae and names Bartolomeo Platina as the first librarian for the Vatican.
- June 19 – After Queen consort Dorothea of Denmark visits Rome, Pope Sixtus IV issues a papal bull permitting King Christian I to establish a university in Denmark
- June 27 – After an 11-month siege, Charles the Bold abandons the Siege of Neuss when an imperial relief army from the Holy Roman Empire approaches; a papal legate of Pope Sixtus IV threatens excommunication of both Charles and Emperor Frederick III should the fighting continue, allowing both rulers to withdraw without loss of honor.

=== July–September ===
- July 4 – Burgundian Wars: Edward IV of England lands in Calais, in support of the Duchy of Burgundy against France.
- August 29 – The Treaty of Picquigny ends the brief war between France and England.
- September 9 – The city of Köln (Cologne), already separate from the surrounding Köln is granted the status of a "free imperial city" by the Holy Roman Empire, with representation in the Imperial Diet and self-government within the Empire.
- September 17 – At the royal capital, Pekan, Ahmad Shah I of Pahang becomes the new Sultan of Pahang (now one of the federal states within Malaysia) upon the death of his younger brother, Muhammad Shah

=== October–December ===
- October 13 – The Swiss Confederacy Canton of Bern invades the Canton of Vaud, at the time under the control of Jacques of Savoy, one of the nobles in the Duchy of Savoy.
- October 22 – In retaliation for the resistance of the village of Les Clées against the Swiss invasion of Vaud, the army of Bern destroys the city and kills the members of the garrison at the Vaud Castle.
- November 13 – Burgundian Wars – In the Battle on the Planta, near Sion in the Swiss Canton of Valais, forces of the Old Swiss Confederacy are victorious against those of the Duchy of Savoy.
- November 14 – The original Landshut Wedding takes place, between George, Duke of Bavaria, and Hedwig Jagiellon.
- November 17 – The Emirate of Granada, led by the Emir Abu'l-Hasan Ali and now part of Spain's Mediterranean coast, signs a peace treaty with the Spanish Kingdom of Castile and León, led by the joint monarchs Isabella and Fernando. In the agreement, Granada offers to assist the Castilians against any attempt by Portugal to invade the Castilian region, Córdoba, that borders Granada.
- December 2 – In the Spanish kingdom of Castile, the siege by Portugal of the Castle of Burgos ends with the commander of the garrison agreeing to surrender within 70 days, "the waiting period decreed by chivalric courtesy" and Queen Isabella enters the city to a welcoming crowd.
- December – The Principality of Theodoro falls to the Ottoman Empire, arguably taking with it the final territorial remnant of the successor to the Roman Kingdom after nearly 2,228 years of Roman civilization since the legendary Founding of Rome in 753 BC.

=== Date unknown ===
- Recuyell of the Historyes of Troye is the first book to be printed in English, by William Caxton in Bruges (or 1473–74?).
- Rashi's commentary on the Torah is the first dated book to be printed in Hebrew, in Reggio di Calabria.
- Conrad of Megenberg's book, Buch der Natur, is published in Augsburg.
- In Wallachia, Radu cel Frumos loses the throne (for the last time), and is again replaced by Basarab Laiotă.

== Births ==
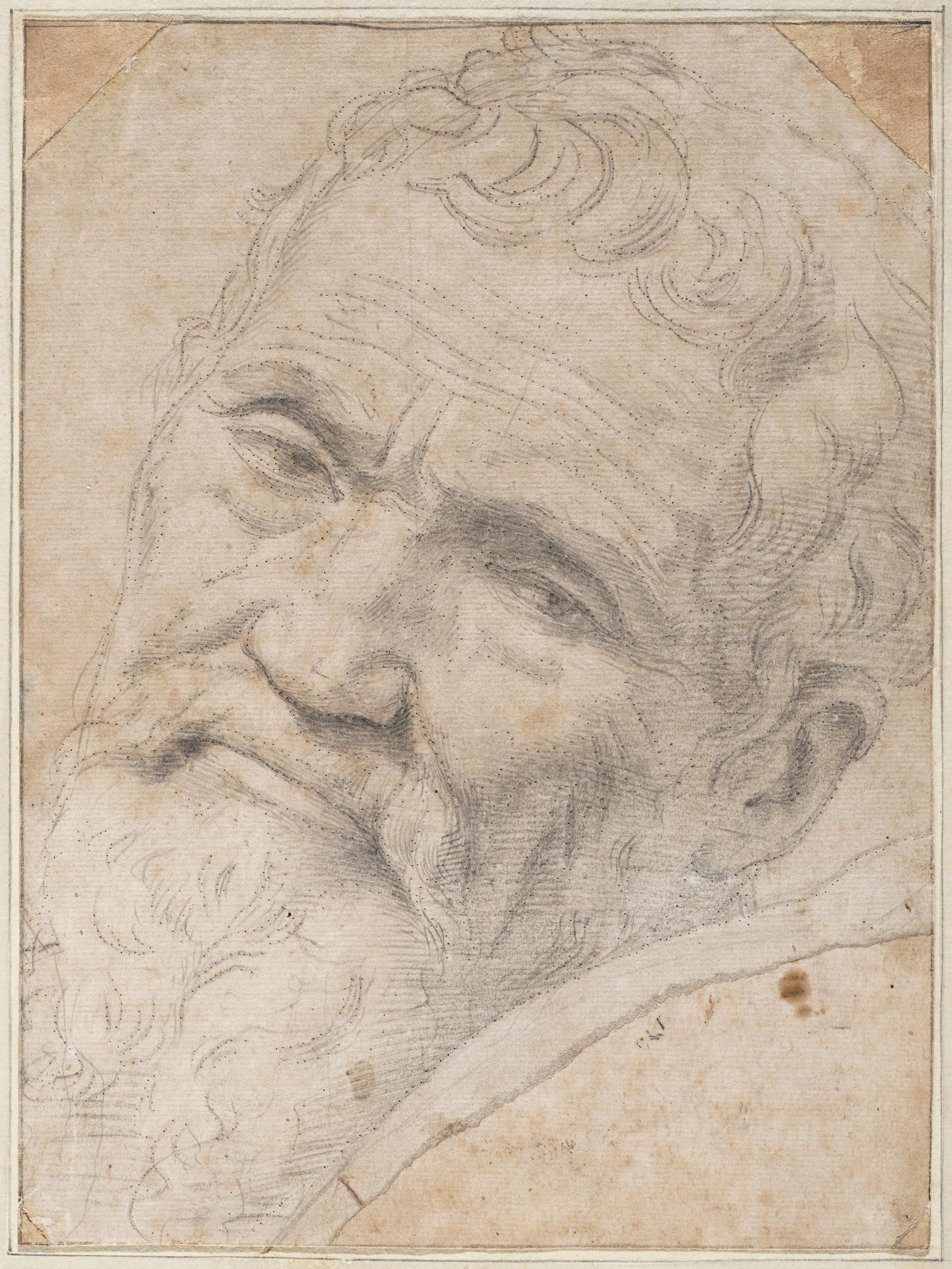
Michelangelo Buonarroti

- January 9 – Crinitus, Italian humanist (d. 1507)
- January 29 – Giuliano Bugiardini, Italian painter (d. 1555)
- February 25 – Edward Plantagenet, 17th Earl of Warwick, last male member of the House of York (d. 1499)
- March 6 – Michelangelo Buonarroti, Italian sculptor (d. 1564)
- March 12 – Luca Gaurico, Italian astrologer (d. 1558)
- March 30 – Elisabeth of Culemborg, German noble (d. 1555)
- June 29 – Beatrice d'Este, duchess of Bari and Milan (d. 1497)
- September 6
  - Artus Gouffier, Lord of Boissy, French nobleman and politician (d. 1519)
  - Sebastiano Serlio, Italian Mannerist architect (d. 1554)
- September 8 – John Stokesley, English prelate (d. 1539)
- September 13 or April 1476 – Cesare Borgia, illegitimate son of Pope Alexander VI (approximate date; d. 1507)
- October 20 – Giovanni di Bernardo Rucellai, Italian Renaissance man of letters (d. 1525)
- November 2 – Anne of York, seventh child of King Edward IV of England and Elizabeth Woodville (d. 1511)
- November 28 – Anne Shelton, elder sister of Thomas Boleyn (d. 1556)
- December 11 – Pope Leo X (d. 1521)
- December 24 – Thomas Murner, German satirist (d. c. 1537)
- date unknown
  - Valerius Anshelm, Swiss chronicler
  - Vasco Núñez de Balboa, Spanish conquistador (approximate date; d. 1519)
  - Gendun Gyatso, 2nd Dalai Lama (d. 1541)
- probable
  - Thomas West, 9th Baron De La Warr (d. 1554)
  - Margaret Drummond, mistress of James IV of Scotland (d. 1502)
  - Pierre Gringoire, French poet and playwright (d. 1538)
  - Filippo de Lurano, Italian composer (d. 1520)
  - Gunilla Bese, Finnish noble and fiefholder (d. 1553)

== Deaths ==
- January – Radu cel Frumos, Voivoid of Wallachia (b. c. 1437)
- February 3 – John IV, Count of Nassau-Siegen (b. 1410)
- March – Simon of Trent, Italian saint, subject of a blood libel
- March 20 – Georges Chastellain, Burgundian chronicler and poet
- May 20 – Alice Chaucer, Duchess of Suffolk (born c.1404)
- June 13 – Joan of Portugal, Queen of Castile (b. 1439)
- September 6 – Adolph II of Nassau, Archbishop of Mainz (b. c. 1423)
- December 10 – Paolo Uccello, Italian painter (b. 1397)
- date unknown
  - Theodorus Gaza, Greek scholar, one of the leaders of the revival of learning in the 15th century (b. c. 1400)
  - Theodosius, Metropolitan of Moscow
  - Masuccio Salernitano, Italian poet (b. 1410)
