= Domenico Maria Novara da Ferrara =

Italian scientist (1454–1504)

Domenico Maria Novara
- Born: 29 July or 1 August 1454; Ferrara
- Died: 15 August or 18 August 1504; Bologna
- Education: University of Florence
- Scientific career
- Fields: Astronomy
- Workplaces: University of Bologna
- Academic advisors: Regiomontanus
- Notable students: Nicolaus Copernicus

Domenico Maria Novara (1454–1504) was an Italian scientist.

== Life ==
Born in Ferrara, for 21 years he was professor of astronomy at the University of Bologna, and in 1500 he also lectured in mathematics at Rome. He was notable as a Platonist astronomer, and in 1496 he taught Nicolaus Copernicus astronomy. He was also an astrologer.

At Bologna, Novara was assisted by Copernicus, with whom he observed a lunar occultation of Aldebaran. Copernicus later used this observation to disprove Ptolemy's model of lunar distance.

Copernicus had started out as Novara's student and then became his assistant and co-worker. Novara in turn declared that his teacher had been the famous astronomer Regiomontanus, who was once a pupil of Georg Purbach. Novara was initially educated at the University of Florence, at the time a major center of Neoplatonism. He studied there under Luca Pacioli, a friend of Leonardo da Vinci.

Novara's writings are largely lost, except for a few astrological almanacs written for the university. But Copernicus's De revolutionibus orbium coelestium (published in 1543, long after Novara's death) records that on 9 March 1497 Novara witnessed Copernicus first observation. Both men were described as "free minds and free souls," and Novara believed that his findings would have shaken Ptolemy's "unshakable" geocentric system.

Novara died in 1504 in Bologna.
