= Great Comet of 1472 =

Comet

C/1471 Y1 (Great Comet of 1472)
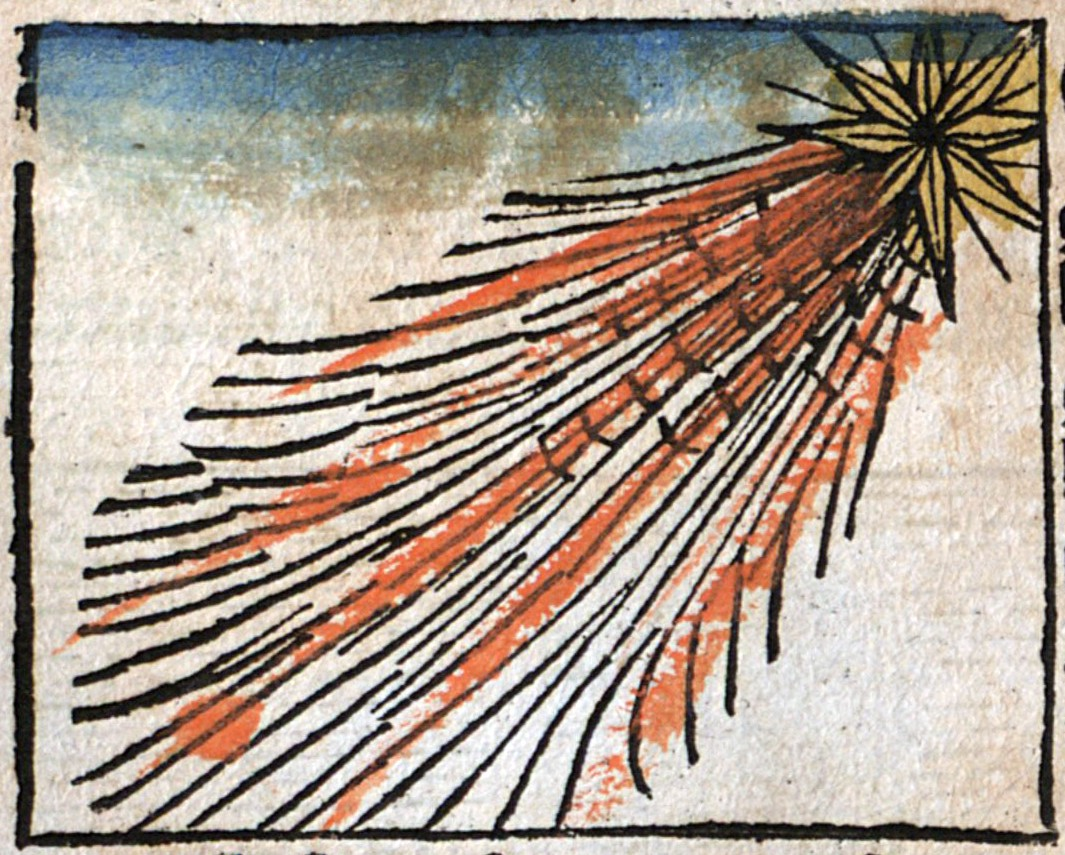
- The comet of 1472 depicted in the Nuremberg Chronicle (1493)

Discovery
- Discovery date: 25 December 1471

Orbital characteristics
- Epoch: 1 March 1472 (JD 2258765.939)
- Observation arc: 12 days
- Number of observations: 3
- Perihelion: 0.4859 AU
- Eccentricity: ~1.000
- Inclination: 170.866°
- Longitude of ascending node: 292.873°
- Argument of periapsis: 245.728°
- Last perihelion: 1 March 1472

The Great Comet of 1472 (designated C/1471 Y1 in modern nomenclature) was visible from Christmas Day 1471 to 1 March 1472 (Julian Calendar), for a total of 59 days. The comet passed 0.07 AU from Earth on 22 January 1472, closer than any other great comet in modern times.

== Observational history ==
The first reports of the comet date from the Christmas Day of 1471, when the comet was located in Virgo. It became better visible in the second week of January 1472, when Korean sources mention that it had a tail 4–5° long. The comet was moving northwards and passed through Bootes, Coma Berenices and Ursa Major and was about 15 degrees from the north celestial pole on 22 January, and the date of perigee, at a distance of 0.07 AU (10 million km; 6.5 million mi). At that time the comet was moving about one degree per hour. Consequently, the comet became better visible in the evening sky, as it moved southwards and towards perihelion. It was last observed around 11 March, when the comet was located in the constellation of Cetus.

An Italian physician named Angelo Cato de Supino also left a description of the comet, claiming it was as bright and majestic as the full moon, its tail extending over more than 30 degrees. Regiomontanus mentioned that on 20 January the tail of the comet measured 50 degrees in length. The comet (or "broom star") was also observed in Chinese astronomy, where it is noted that it was visible even at midday. The 15th century English Chronicler, John Warkworth, left a detailed account of the comet's appearance and disappearance from the night sky of England.

== Scientific results ==
The comet is notable because it was observed by 15th-century astronomers, during a time of rapid progress in planetary theory, shortly before the Copernican Revolution. The comet was observed by Regiomontanus and Bernhard Walther from Nuremberg. Regiomontanus tried to estimate its distance from Earth, using parallax. According to Seargeant (2009):

In agreement with the prevailing Aristotelian theory on comets as atmospheric phenomena, he estimated its distance to be at least 8,200 miles (13,120 km) and, from this, estimated the central condensation as 26, and the entire coma as 81 miles (41.6 and 129.6 km respectively) in diameter. These values, of course, fail by orders of magnitude, but he is to be commended for this attempt at determining the physical dimensions of the comet.

The comet is now known to have passed 0.07 AU (10 million km; 6.5 million mi) from Earth, which marks the closest a great comet has approached Earth in modern times. Only the Great Comet of 1556 and Comet Hyakutake have approached in a comparable distance since then.

== See also ==
- Halley's Comet#1456
- Great Comet of 1556
- Great Comet of 1577

== Bibliography ==
- Kronk, Gary W. (2009). Cometography: A Catalog of Comets. Cambridge: Cambridge University Press. ISBN 978-0-51150-435-8.
- Jervis, Jane L. (1985). Cometary Theory in Fifteenth-Century Europe. Dordrecht: D. Reidel. ISBN 978-9-02771-911-9.
- Seargeant, David A. (2009). The Greatest Comets in History. New York: Springer. ISBN 978-0-38709-513-4.
