= Richard III =

Richard III may refer to:

== People ==
- Richard III of England (1452–1485)
- Richard III of Normandy (997–1027)
- Richard III of Capua (died 1120)
- Richard III of Gaeta (died 1140)
- Richard III de Bermingham (died 1643)

== Literature ==
- Richard III (play), a play by William Shakespeare (c. 1592–1594)
- Richard III (1699 play), a play by Colley Cibber
- Richard III (1852 play), a Shakespeare-inspired French play by Victor Séjour
- Richard III (biography), a 1955 biography of the English king by Paul Murray Kendall

== Film and television ==
- Richard III (1912 film), with Frederick Warde
- Richard III (1955 film), with Laurence Olivier, Ralph Richardson and John Gielgud
- III. Richárd (1973 film), a Hungarian television film by György Fehér
- Richard III (1982 film), a Soviet Union film with Ramaz Chkhikvadze
- The Tragedy of Richard III (1983 film), part of BBC Television Shakespeare
- Richard III (1986 film), a French film with Ariel García Valdés; see Cultural depictions of Richard III of England
- Richard III (1995 film), with Ian McKellen and Annette Bening
- Richard III (2007 film), a crime drama film
- Richard III (2015 film), a French-German television film with Lars Eidinger
- Richard III (The Hollow Crown), a 2016 British television film

== Music ==
- "Richard III" a symphonic poem by Bedřich Smetana
- "Richard III" (song), a 1997 song by Supergrass

== See also ==
- Richard III Society
