= List of acts of the Parliament of England from 1474 =

This is a list of acts of the Parliament of England for the year 1474.

For acts passed during the period 1707–1800, see the list of acts of the Parliament of Great Britain. See also the list of acts of the Parliament of Scotland, and the list of acts of the Parliament of Ireland.

For acts passed from 1801 onwards, see the list of acts of the Parliament of the United Kingdom. For acts of the devolved parliaments and assemblies in the United Kingdom, see the list of acts of the Scottish Parliament, the list of acts of the Northern Ireland Assembly, and the list of acts and measures of Senedd Cymru; see also the list of acts of the Parliament of Northern Ireland.

For medieval statutes, etc. that are not considered to be acts of Parliament, see the list of English statutes.

See also the List of ordinances and acts of the Parliament of England, 1642–1660 for ordinances and acts passed by the Long Parliament and other bodies without royal assent, and which were not considered to be valid legislation following the Restoration in 1660.

The number shown after each act's title is its chapter number. Acts are cited using this number, preceded by the years of the reign during which the relevant parliamentary session was held; thus the Union with Ireland Act 1800 is cited as "39 & 40 Geo. 3. c. 67", meaning the 67th act passed during the session that started in the 39th year of the reign of George III and which finished in the 40th year of that reign. The modern convention is to use Arabic numerals in citations (thus "41 Geo. 3" rather than "41 Geo. III"). Acts of the last session of the Parliament of Great Britain and the first session of the Parliament of the United Kingdom are both cited as "41 Geo. 3".

Acts passed by the Parliament of England did not have a short title; however, some of these acts have subsequently been given a short title by acts of the Parliament of the United Kingdom, such as the Short Titles Act 1896 (59 & 60 Vict. c. 14).

Acts passed by the Parliament of England were deemed to have come into effect on the first day of the session in which they were passed. Because of this, the years given in the list below may in fact be the year before a particular act was passed.

== 14 Edw. 4 ==
The second session of the 4th Parliament of King Edward IV, which met at Westminster from 23 January 1475 until 14 March 1475.

This session was also traditionally cited as 14 Ed. 4 or 14 E. 4.

Short title	Citation	Royal assent
Long title
King's Tenants Act 1474 (repealed)	14 Edw. 4. c. 1	14 March 1475
An Act for the King's tenants going in his wars. (Repealed for England and Wales by Statute Law Revision Act 1863 (26 & 27 Vict. c. 125) and for Ireland by Statute Law (Ireland) Revision Act 1872 (35 & 36 Vict. c. 98))
Protections Act 1474 (repealed)	14 Edw. 4. c. 2	14 March 1475
An Act touching protections for such as go in the King's wars. (Repealed for England and Wales by Statute Law Revision Act 1863 (26 & 27 Vict. c. 125) and for Ireland by Statute Law (Ireland) Revision Act 1872 (35 & 36 Vict. c. 98))
Wool Act 1474 (repealed)	14 Edw. 4. c. 3	14 March 1475
An Act for shipping of wools and fells. (Repealed by Repeal of Acts Concerning Importation Act 1822 (3 Geo. 4. c. 41))
Safe Conducts Act 1474 (repealed)	14 Edw. 4. c. 4	14 March 1475
An Act to confirm statutes made against the breakers of truce, &c. (Repealed for England and Wales by Statute Law Revision Act 1863 (26 & 27 Vict. c. 125) and for Ireland by Statute Law (Ireland) Revision Act 1872 (35 & 36 Vict. c. 98))

=== Sources ===
- "14° Edw. IV.". The Statutes of the Realm. Vol. 2: 1377 to 1509. pp. 445–451 – via HathiTrust.
- "Anno decimo quarto Edwardi IV". The Statutes at Large. Vol. 3 – 1 Henry V to 22 Edward IV – 1413 to 1482–3. Printed by J. Bentham. 16 April 1762. pp. 425–433 – via Internet Archive.
- "Anno decimo quarto Edwardi IV". The Statutes at Large. Vol. 3 – 1 Henry V to 22 Edward IV – 1413 to 1482–3. C. Eyre and A. Strahan. 16 April 1762. pp. 425–433 – via Internet Archive.
- Chronological Table of and Index to the Statutes. Vol. 1: To the End of the Session 59 Vict. Sess. 2 (1895) (13th ed.). London: Her Majesty's Stationery Office. 1896. p. 39 – via Google Books.
- Chronological Table of the Statutes: Covering the Period from 1235 to the End of 1971. London: Her Majesty's Stationery Office. 1972. p. 34. ISBN 978-0-11-840096-1 – via Google Books.

== See also ==
- List of acts of the Parliament of England
