= Valerius Anshelm =

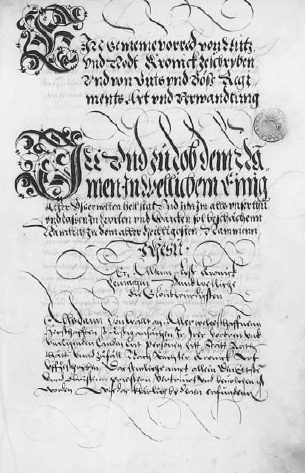
First page of an official copy of Anshelm's Berner Chronik, written by his son Peter Paul Anshelm.

Valerius Anshelm (1475 – 1546/1547), born as Valerius Rüd (or Ryd), was a Swiss chronicler working in Bern.

Anshelm was born in Rottweil, a city in Swabia that was allied with the Old Swiss Confederacy. His grandfather „Boley der Rüd genannt Anshelm“ had fought on the side of the Eidgenossen in the Burgundy Wars. After studies in Kraków (1493–1495) and Tübingen (until 1499) he spent some time as a travelling scholar (in 1501, he was in Lyon). He then settled in Bern, where he was appointed on 22 August 1505 the headmaster of the Latin school. In 1508, he became the city physician.

As a sympathizer of the Reformation, he corresponded with reformers such as Zwingli and Vadian. A critical remark of his wife on the veneration of Mary earned him a reprimand by the city council and a substantial pay cut in 1523, and as a consequence the family moved to Rottweil two years later. However, there he got involved in the conflicts between Catholics and Protestants, too, and even spent some time in jail. When the Protestants were banned from Rottweil in 1529, he more than gladly followed a call of Bern (which had become Protestant in 1528) to serve as the city's chronicler. From 1535 to 1537 he again served also as the city physician (Stadtarzt). He died between 1 August 1546 and 21 February 1547; the exact date is unknown.

Anshelm's appointment as chronicler was based on his having written a Latin chronicle of world history already during his first stay in Bern. Written in 1510, it was not printed until 1540, but Anshelm had distributed handwritten copies before. His main opus, however, was the Berner Chronik, a history of the city of Bern on which he worked in his position as city chronicler until his death. After a brief introduction to the early history, it covered especially the time from the Burgundy Wars until 1536, although only fragments of the period of 1526 to 1536 survived. It remained buried in the municipal archives of Bern and was thus not widely known until the 17th century, when Michael Stettler was commissioned to continue Anshelm's work. Stettler's own Schweizerchronik, a history of Switzerland that was based on Anshelm's work, appeared first in 1626.
