= Bernhard Walther =

German astronomer

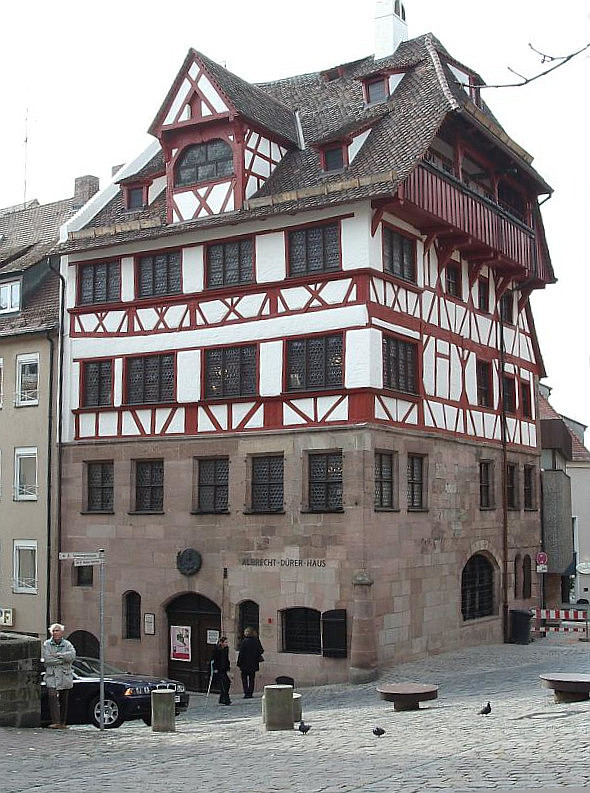
Walther's residence where the observatory was located. Now the Albrecht Dürer House museum.

Bernhard Walther (1430 – June 19, 1504) was a German merchant, humanist and astronomer based in Nuremberg, Germany.

Walther was born in Memmingen, and was a man of large means, which he devoted to scientific pursuits. When Regiomontanus settled in Nuremberg in 1471, they worked in collaboration to build an observatory and a printing press. After the death of Regiomontanus in 1476 at Rome, Walther bought his instruments, after Hans von Dorn, commissioned by the Hungarian king, had failed to come to an agreement with the council of Nuremberg. Walther continued to observe the planets until his death in Nuremberg. His house, purchased in 1509 by Albrecht Dürer, is today a museum.

== Astronomy ==
Walther amplified on the effects of refraction in altering the apparent location of the heavenly bodies, and substituted Venus for the Moon as a connecting-link between observations of the Sun and stars. As a result, his observations are the most precise prior to those of Tycho Brahe.

His pupil Johannes Schöner made unpublished data of Walther's observations of Mercury available to Nicolaus Copernicus. There were 45 observations in total, 14 of them with longitude and latitude. Copernicus used three of them in "De revolutionibus", giving only longitudes, and erroneously attributed them to Schöner.

These values differed slightly from the ones published by Schöner in 1544 in Observationes XXX annorum a I. Regiomontano et B. Walthero Norimbergae habitae, [4°, Norimb. 1544]., a collection of the astronomical observations of Regiomontanus and Walther, as well as manuscripts of Regiomontanus, which had been in the possession of Walther. In 1618, Willebrord Snell noted them as an appendix to his Observationes Hassiaceae.

== Equipment ==
In 1484 Walther introduced clocks driven by weights, their first use in astronomical determinations. His printing press was used to produce some of the earliest astronomical publications.

== Legacy ==
Walther is the eponym of lunar crater Walther.

== Works ==
- Regiomontanus, Johannes: Opera Collectanea. Osnabrück: Otto Zeller 1972 (includes Observations by Bernhard Walther)
