= 1476 =

1476 in various calendars
- Gregorian calendar: 1476; MCDLXXVI
- Ab urbe condita: 2229
- Armenian calendar: 925; ԹՎ ՋԻԵ
- Assyrian calendar: 6226
- Balinese saka calendar: 1397–1398
- Bengali calendar: 882–883
- Berber calendar: 2426
- English Regnal year: 15 Edw. 4 – 16 Edw. 4
- Buddhist calendar: 2020
- Burmese calendar: 838
- Byzantine calendar: 6984–6985
- Chinese calendar: 乙未年 (Wood Goat); 4173 or 3966 — to — 丙申年 (Fire Monkey); 4174 or 3967
- Coptic calendar: 1192–1193
- Discordian calendar: 2642
- Ethiopian calendar: 1468–1469
- Hebrew calendar: 5236–5237
- Hindu calendars
- Vikram Samvat: 1532–1533
- Shaka Samvat: 1397–1398
- Kali Yuga: 4576–4577
- Holocene calendar: 11476
- Igbo calendar: 476–477
- Iranian calendar: 854–855
- Islamic calendar: 880–881
- Japanese calendar: Bunmei 8 (文明８年)
- Javanese calendar: 1392–1393
- Julian calendar: 1476; MCDLXXVI
- Korean calendar: 3809
- Minguo calendar: 436 before ROC 民前436年
- Nanakshahi calendar: 8
- Thai solar calendar: 2018–2019
- Tibetan calendar: ཤིང་མོ་ལུག་ལོ་ (female Wood-Sheep); 1602 or 1221 or 449 — to — མེ་ཕོ་སྤྲེ་ལོ་ (male Fire-Monkey); 1603 or 1222 or 450

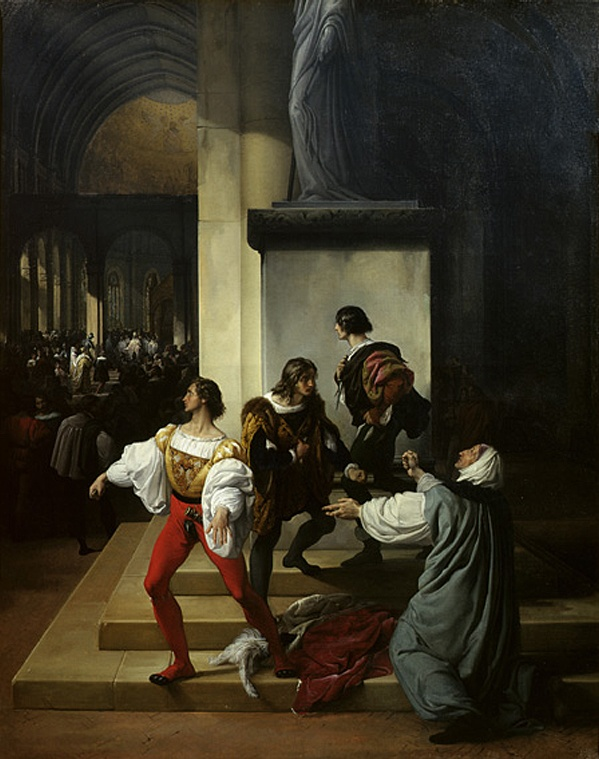
December 25: The Duke of Milan, Galeazzo Sforza, is assassinated during a church service.

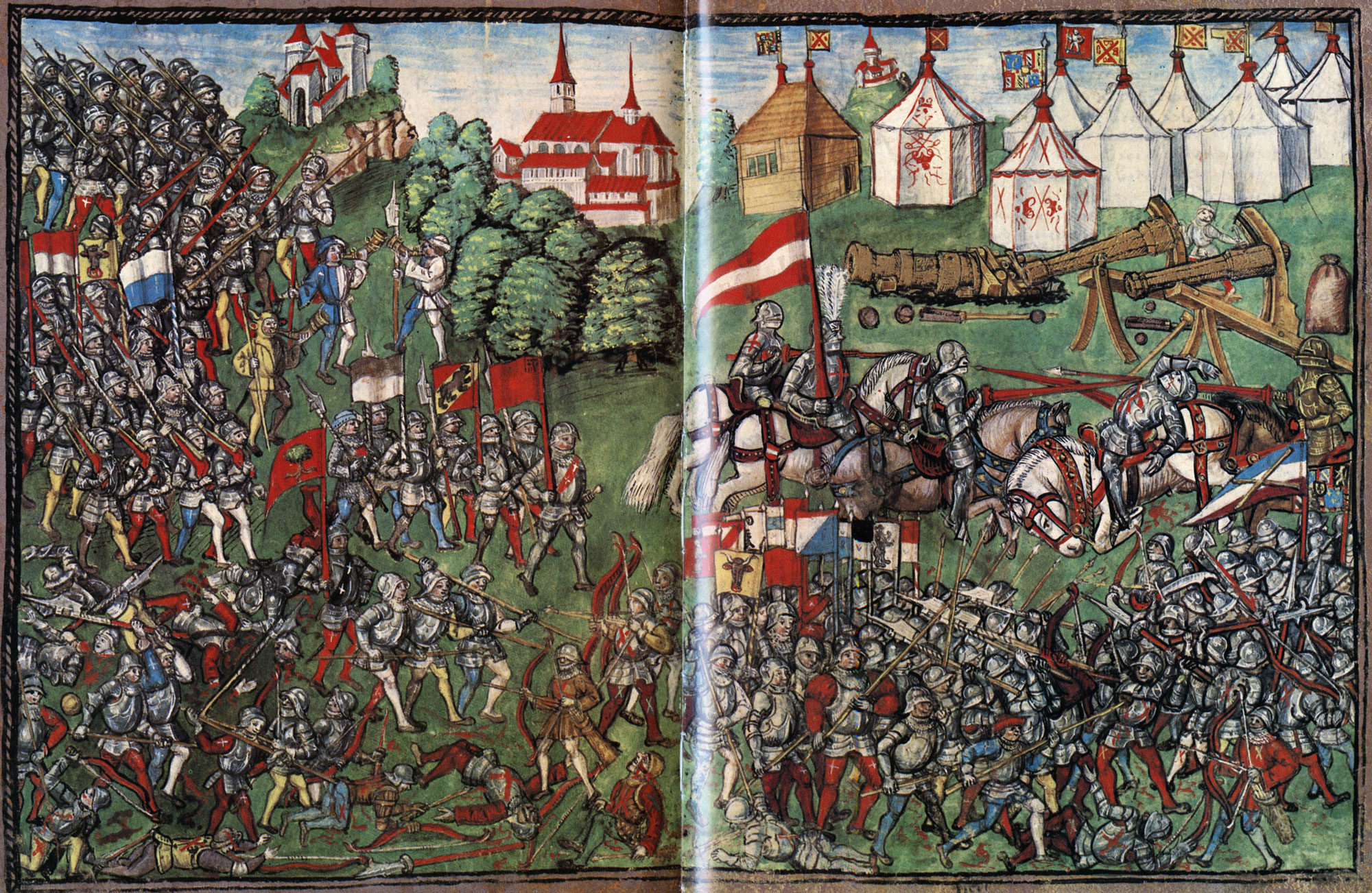
March 2: The Battle of Grandson is fought in Switzerland.

Year 1476 (MCDLXXVI) was a leap year starting on Monday of the Julian calendar.

== Events ==
=== January–March ===
- January 19 – The siege of Burgos comes to an end as the Portuguese defender, Juan de Stúñiga, relinquishes control of the castle back to the Castilians.
- February 15 – After turning down an offer of peace negotiations with the Ottoman Empire, Bohemia's King Matthias Corvinus leads troops across the Hungarian border and captures the fortress of Šabac.
- February 23 – Pietro Mocenigo, Doge of the Republic of Venice, dies after 15 months in office.
- February 28 – In the Swiss Canton of Vaud, after a seven-day siege, Charles the Bold, Duke of Burgundy, obtains the surrender of Swiss Confederacy troops at the garrsion of the village of Grandson (originally Grancione). The surrender had been obtained by the promises of Charles that the lives of the 412 Swiss defenders would be spared if they gave up, but Charles orders that they be executed anyway. Some are hanged, while others are drowned in Lake Neuchâtel over a period of four hours.
- March 1 – The Battle of Toro is fought between Castilian and Portuguese forces during the War of the Castilian Succession). Although militarily inconclusive, the victory over Portugal ensures the Catholic Monarchs the Crown of Castile, forming the basis for modern-day Spain.
- March 2 – In retaliation for the massacre of the Swiss defenders of the Grandson Castle, troops from the Canton of Bern and the Old Swiss Confederacy defeat the Burgundian troops of Charles the Bold and force him to flee.
- March 5 – Andrea Vendramin is elected as the new Doge of the Republic of Venice.

=== April–June ===
- April 14 –The Treaty of Fribourg is signed by representatives of the Swiss Confederation and the Duchy of Savoy after France's King Louis XI intervenes to stop the war in Switzerland over former Savoyard territories in the Canton of Vaud.
- May 3 – Hans Böhm, the "rummer of Niklashausen", incites a peasant uprising in an around Niklashausen in the German Prince-Bishopric of Würzburg. He is captured and eventually executed on July 19.
- May 23 – (1st waxing of Waso 838 ME) In what is now Myanmar, the Thet minority rebels against King Ba Saw Phyu of Arakan but the rebellion is quickly put down.
- June 22 – Burgundian Wars: In the Battle of Morat, The Burgundians suffer a crushing defeat, losing half of its army of at least 12,000 soldiers, at the hands of the Swiss, who sustain only 410 casualties.

=== July–September ===
- July 26 – At the Battle of Valea Albă, fought at what is now Războieni in Romania, the Ottoman Sultan Mehmed II defeats Stephen III of Moldavia.
- August 7 – The Battle of Cabo São Vicente is fought as two Portuguese galleys, aided by 11 armed French pirate ships, encounter a set of five armed Spanish merchant ships. The French ships use incendiary weapons, though the fire destroys four of their own vessels as well as three enemy ships.
- August 8 – Lady Suk-ui, daughter of Yun Gi-Gyeon of the Haman Yun clan is installed as the new Queen Consort of Korea's King Seongjong of Joseon, two years after the death of Queen consort Han Song-yi, who produced no heir to the throne. Suk-ui, also known as Queen Yun, gives birth to an heir, Yeonsangun of Joseon, three months later. Queen Yun is deposed three years later and executed by poisoning.
- September 6 – Matthias Corvinus, as King of Bohemia, orders the Transylvanian Saxons in his employment to assist Stephen V Báthory in the invasion of the principality of Wallachia.

=== October –December ===
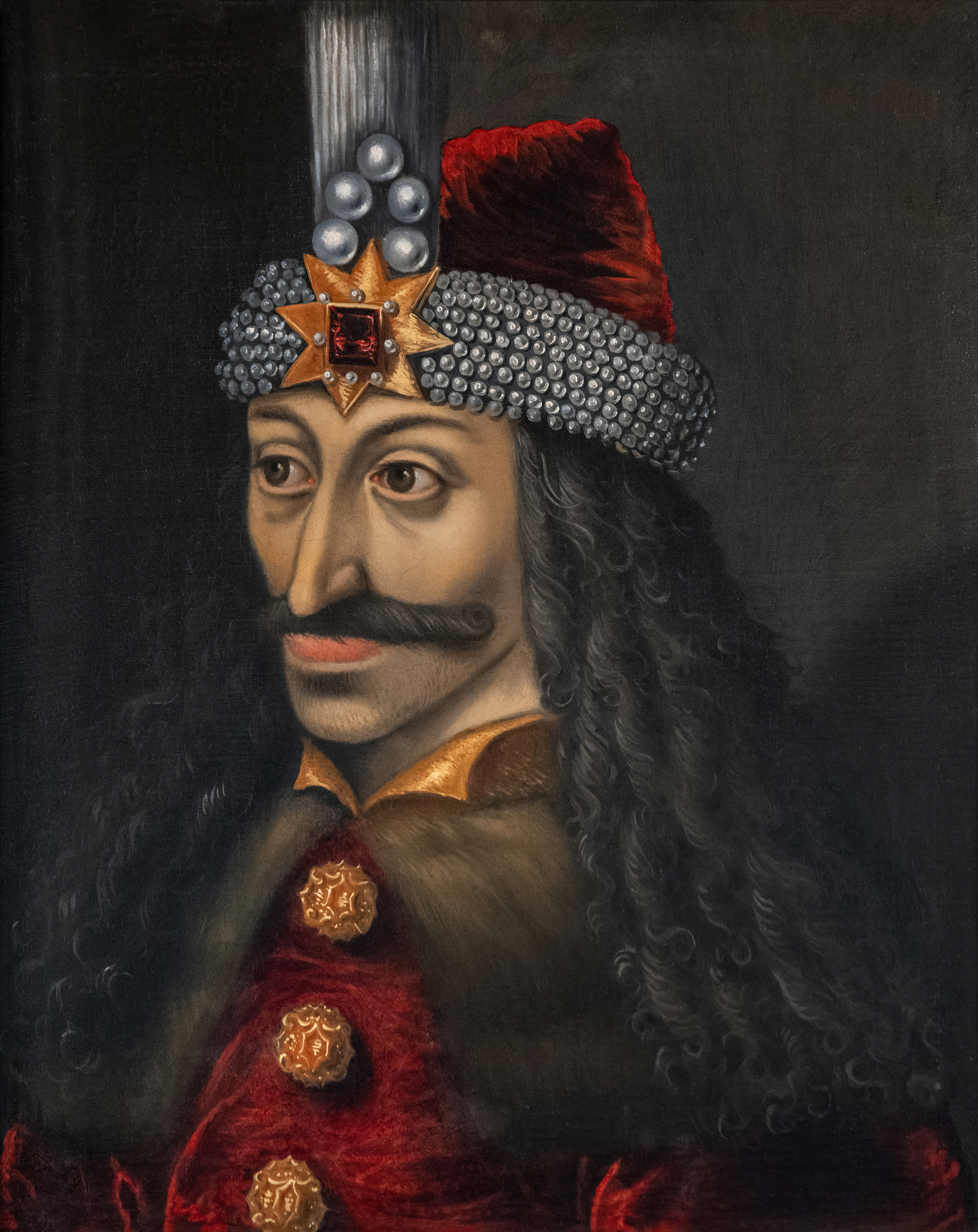
November 26: Vlad the Impaler declares himself the Prince of Wallachia, but is killed less than a month later.

- October 8 – Burgundian Wars: Charles the Bold, Duke of Burgundy, begins the Siege of Nancy, capital of the Duchy of Lorraine, in an attempt to regain control of it after Rene II, Duke of Lorraine, had captured it earlier. Rene II, aided by the Swiss Confederation, makes plans to break the siege, leading to the Battle of Nancy on January 5, 1477.
- November 8 – Báthory's invasion of Wallachia is successful in capturing Târgoviște.
- November 26 – Vlad the Impaler declares himself reigning Voivode (Prince) of Wallachia for the third and last time. He is killed on the march to Bucharest, probably before the end of December. His head is sent to his old enemy, Ottoman Sultan Mehmed II.
- December 5 – King Vladislaus II of Hungary enters into an alliance with Frederick III, Holy Roman Emperor, against Matthias Corvinus, King of Bohemia.
- December 12 – Philip the Upright becomes the new Elector of the Palatinate within the Holy Roman Empire, upon the death of his adoptive father, the Elector Frederick I.
- December 22 – Beatrice of Naples marries Mathias Corvinus at Székesfehérvár, 10 days after her coronation as Queen Consort of Bohemia and Queen Consort of Hungary.
- December 26 – Galeazzo Maria Sforza, Duke of Milan, is assassinated by Giovanni Andrea Lampugnani while inside the Basilica di Santo Stefano Maggiore. Lampugnani, wearing hidden armour, stabs the Duke in the chest and two other aggrieved officials, Carlo Visconti and Gerolamo Olgiati, follow with other weapons.

=== Date unknown ===
- Leonardo da Vinci is acquitted on charges of sodomy, after which he disappears from the historical record for two years.
- Axayacatl, sixth Tlatoani of Tenochtitlán, is defeated by the Tarascans of Michoacán.
- Goyghor Mosque is built by Musa ibn Haji Amir and his son, Majlis Alam.

== Births ==
- January 14 – Anne St Leger, Baroness de Ros, English baroness (d. 1526)
- March 12 – Anna Jagiellon, Duchess of Pomerania, Polish princess (d. 1503)
- May 2 – Charles I, Duke of Münsterberg-Oels, Count of Kladsko, Governor of Bohemia and Silesia (d. 1536)
- May 19 – Helena of Moscow, Grand Duchess consort of Lithuania and Queen consort of Poland (d. 1513)
- June 28 – Pope Paul IV (d. 1559)
- July 17 – Adrian Fortescue, English Roman Catholic martyr (d. 1539)
- July 21
  - Alfonso I d'Este, Duke of Ferrara (d. 1534)
  - Anna Sforza, Italian noble (d. 1497)
- July 22 – Zhu Youyuan, Ming Dynasty politician (d. 1519)
- August 28 – Kanō Motonobu, Japanese painter (d. 1559)
- September 11 – Louise of Savoy, French regent (d. 1531)
- October 1 – Guy XVI, Count of Laval (d. 1531)
- October 26 – Yi Ki, Korean philosopher (d. 1552)
- November 23 – Yeonsangun of Joseon, King of Korean Joseon Dynasty (d. 1506)
- December 13 – Lucy Brocadelli, Dominican tertiary and stigmatic (d. 1544)
- date unknown – Juan Sebastián Elcano, Spanish explorer (d. 1526)

== Deaths ==
- January 14
  - John de Mowbray, 4th Duke of Norfolk (b. 1444)
  - Anne of York, Duchess of Exeter, Duchess of York, second child of Richard Plantagenet (b. 1439)
- March 1 – Imagawa Yoshitada, 9th head of the Imagawa clan (b. 1436)
- March 10 – Richard West, 7th Baron De La Warr (b. 1430)
- March – John I Ernuszt, Ban of Slavonia
- June 8 – George Neville, English archbishop and statesman (b. c. 1432)
- July 6 – Regiomontanus, German astronomer (b. 1436)
- September 8 – John II, Duke of Alençon, son of John I of Alençon and Marie of Brittany (b. 1409)
- November 28 – James of the Marches, Franciscan friar
- December
  - Vlad III the Impaler, Prince of Wallachia (b. 1431)
  - Isabel Neville, Duchess of Clarence, English noblewoman (b. 1451)
- December 12 – Frederick I, Elector Palatine (b. 1425)
- December 26 – Galeazzo Maria Sforza, Duke of Milan (assassinated) (b. 1444)
- Clara Hätzlerin, German scribe (b. 1430)
