= 1477 =

1477 in various calendars
- Gregorian calendar: 1477; MCDLXXVII
- Ab urbe condita: 2230
- Armenian calendar: 926; ԹՎ ՋԻԶ
- Assyrian calendar: 6227
- Balinese saka calendar: 1398–1399
- Bengali calendar: 883–884
- Berber calendar: 2427
- English Regnal year: 16 Edw. 4 – 17 Edw. 4
- Buddhist calendar: 2021
- Burmese calendar: 839
- Byzantine calendar: 6985–6986
- Chinese calendar: 丙申年 (Fire Monkey); 4174 or 3967 — to — 丁酉年 (Fire Rooster); 4175 or 3968
- Coptic calendar: 1193–1194
- Discordian calendar: 2643
- Ethiopian calendar: 1469–1470
- Hebrew calendar: 5237–5238
- Hindu calendars
- Vikram Samvat: 1533–1534
- Shaka Samvat: 1398–1399
- Kali Yuga: 4577–4578
- Holocene calendar: 11477
- Igbo calendar: 477–478
- Iranian calendar: 855–856
- Islamic calendar: 881–882
- Japanese calendar: Bunmei 9 (文明９年)
- Javanese calendar: 1393–1394
- Julian calendar: 1477; MCDLXXVII
- Korean calendar: 3810
- Minguo calendar: 435 before ROC 民前435年
- Nanakshahi calendar: 9
- Thai solar calendar: 2019–2020
- Tibetan calendar: མེ་ཕོ་སྤྲེ་ལོ་ (male Fire-Monkey); 1603 or 1222 or 450 — to — མེ་མོ་བྱ་ལོ་ (female Fire-Bird); 1604 or 1223 or 451

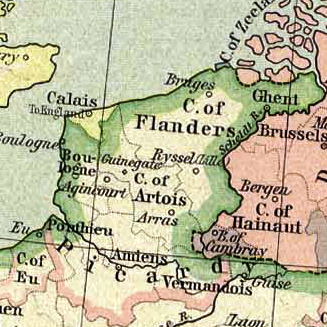
The situation of 1477, with Calais, the English Pale and neighboring counties.

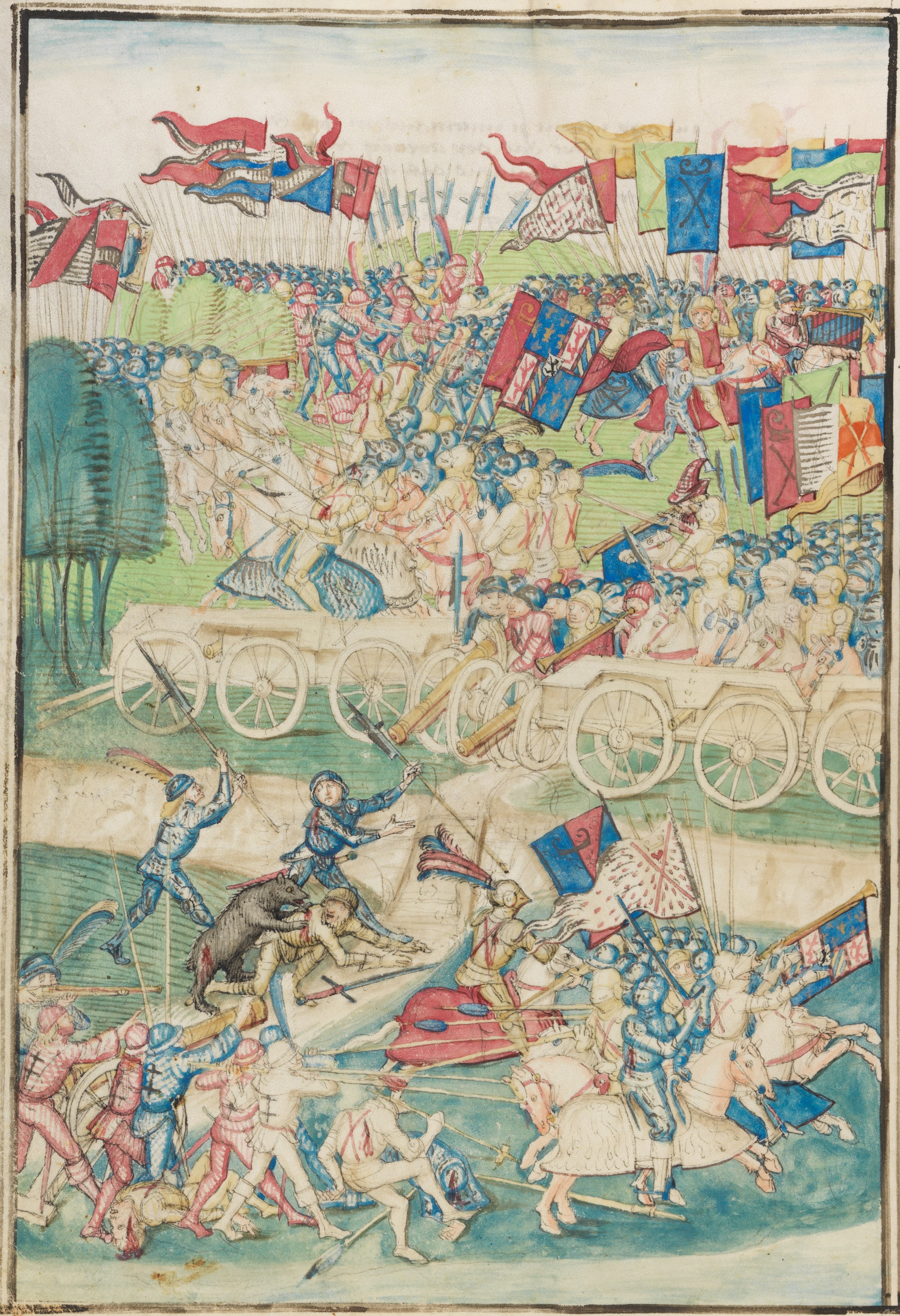
January 5: Burgundy is defeated at the Battle of Nancy and the Duke Charles is killed along with most of his troops.

Year 1477 (MCDLXXVII) was a common year starting on Wednesday of the Julian calendar.

== Events ==
=== January–March ===
- January 5 – At the Battle of Nancy in France, Charles the Bold of Duke of Burgundy, who had begun the siege of the capital of the Duchy of Lorraine on October 22, is forced to retreat from a larger force of troops from Lorraine and the Swiss Army. During the retreat, the Burgundians pursued and then surrounded by the Swiss. Charles is struck in the head by a halberd and killed, while most of the Burgundian troops are slaughtered. The defeat brings an end to the Burgundian Wars.
- February 11 – Mary of Burgundy, the daughter of Charles the Bold and the new Duches, is forced by her disgruntled subjects to sign the Great Privilege, by which the Flemish cities recover all the local and communal rights which have been abolished by the decrees of the dukes of Burgundy, in their efforts to create a centralized state in the Low Countries.
- February 27 – Uppsala University is founded, becoming the first university in Sweden and all of Scandinavia.
- March 26 – Two months after the death in battle of the Duke of Burgundy, an uprising and rioting take place in Bruges, and 15 local officials, including former mayor Anselm Adornes, are arrested by Burgundian troops, though they are later released without being charged.

=== April–June ===
- April 3 – William Hugonet, formerly the Chancellor of the Duchy of Burgundy during the reign of Charles the Bold, is beheaded in Ghent by citizens who had blamed him for having reduced their independence. Hugonet is executed along with the Marshal of Brabant, Guy of Brimeu (Lord Humbercourt) and the Burgundian treasurer Jan van Melle.
- May 10 – In England, John Stacy, Thomas Burdet and Thomas Blake are convicted of high treason after being charged with "imagining and compassing" the death of King Edward IV. Stacy and Burdet are hanged, drawn and quartered the next day.
- May 12 – Pope Sixtus IV grants a special dispensation for Richard of Shrewsbury, Duke of York, the three-year-old son of King Edward IV, is betrothed to 4-year-old Anne de Mowbray, 8th Countess of Norfolk, in a waiver of canon law that sets a minimum age for marriage as 14 for boys and 12 for girls. The children's wedding will take place on January 15, 1478.
- June 10 – Emperor Frederick II confirms his support of Vladislav Jagellonský as King of Bohemia, leading to Matthias Corvinus declaring war on the Holy Roman Empire.

=== July–September ===
- July 21 – The 1475 Treaty of Picquigny between the Kingdom of England and the Kingdom of France, is extended by agreement between England's King Edward IV and France's King Louis XI, with a provision that the cessation of hostilities will continue for one year after the death of one of the two monarchs.Louis.
- August 4 – Martin Truchsess von Wetzhausen is elected as the new Grand Master of the Teutonic Knights to succeed the late Heinrich Reffle von Richtenberg as ruler of a few territories in Prussia.
- August 18 – Mary, Duchess of Burgundy, marries Prince Maximilian, son of the Holy Roman Emperor, in Ghent, bringing her Flemish and Burgundian lands into the Holy Roman Empire, and detaching them from France.
- September 14 – King Ferrante of Napoli marries Princess Juana, daughter of the Spanish King John II of Aragon and Navarre after being brought to Naples by King Ferrante's son Prince Alfonso, Duke of Calabria.

=== October–December ===
- October 9 – The University of Tübingen, one of the 11 German Excellence Universities, is founded in Württemberg by Count Eberhard I.
- November 18 – William Caxton produces Earl Rivers' translation into English of Dictes or Sayengis of the Philosophres, at his press in Westminster, the first full-length book printed in England on a printing press.
- December 1 – King Matthias Corvinus of Hungary signs a treaty with Frederick III, Holy Roman Emperor at Korneuburg, ending the Hungarian blockade of Vienna in return for Frederick's support for making Matthias King of Bohemia and an indemnity of 100,000 florins.
- December 25 – (20th day of 11th month of Bunmei 9 – The Ōnin War comes to an end in Japan after more than 10 years.

=== Undated ===
- Giovanni Pico della Mirandola starts to study canon law, at the University of Bologna.
- Thomas Norton (alchemist) writes Ordinall of Alchemy.
- The first edition of The Travels of Marco Polo is printed.

== Births ==
- January 13 – Henry Percy, 5th Earl of Northumberland (d. 1527)
- January 14 – Hermann of Wied, German Catholic archbishop (d. 1552)
- January 16 – Johannes Schöner, German astronomer and cartographer (d. 1547)
- January 25 – Anne of Brittany, sovereign duchess of Brittany, queen of Charles VIII of France (d. 1514)
- March 20 – Jerome Emser, German theologian (d. 1527)
- June 22 – Thomas Grey, 2nd Marquess of Dorset, English noble (d. 1530)
- July 4 – Johannes Aventinus, Bavarian historian and philologist (d. 1534)
- July 12 – Jacopo Sadoleto, Italian cardinal (d. 1547)
- September 1 – Bartolomeo Fanfulla, Italian mercenary (d. 1525)
- September 19 – Ferrante d'Este, Ferrarese nobleman and condottiero (d. 1540)
- September 21 – Matthäus Zell, German Lutheran pastor (d. 1548)
- date unknown – István Báthory, Hungarian nobleman (d. 1534)
- probable
  - Giorgione, painter in Italian High Renaissance (d. 1510)
  - Girolamo del Pacchia, Italian painter (d. 1533)
  - Lambert Simnel, pretender to the throne of England (d. c. 1534)
  - Il Sodoma, Italian painter (d. 1549)
  - Thomas Boleyn, 1st Earl of Wiltshire, English diplomat (d. 1539)

== Deaths ==
- January 2
  - Franzone, Italian assassin (executed)
  - Gerolamo Olgiati, Italian assassin (executed)
  - Carlo Visconti, Italian assassin (executed)
- January 5 – Charles the Bold, Duke of Burgundy (in battle) (b. 1433)
- January 6 – Jean VIII, Count of Vendôme
- January 15 – Adriana of Nassau-Siegen, consort of Count Philip I of Hanau-Münzenberg (b. 1449)
- April 3 – William Hugonet, former chancellor of Burgundy (executed)
- June 1 – Charlotte de Brézé, French countess (b. 1446)
- June 27 – Adolf, Duke of Guelders and Count of Zutphen (1465–1471) (b. 1438)
- August 4 – Jacques d'Armagnac, Duke of Nemours
- August 11 – Latino Orsini, Italian Catholic cardinal (b. 1411)
- December 19 – Maria of Mangup, Princess-consort of Moldavia
