= Lampugnani's Conspiracy =

Painting by Francesco Hayez

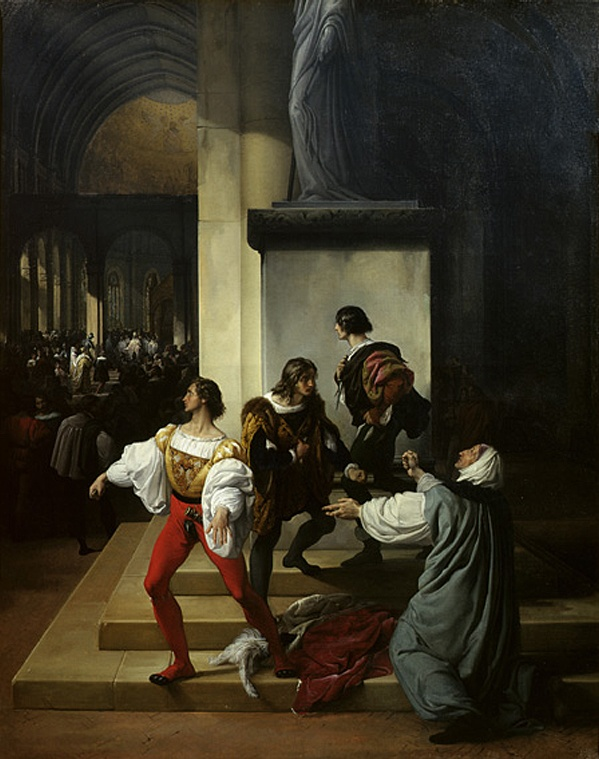
Lampugnani's Conspiracy (1826) by Francesco Hayez

Lampugnani's Conspiracy is an 1826 oil-on-canvas painting by the Italian artist Francesco Hayez, now in the pinacoteca di Brera in Milan, which acquired it in 1907. It shows the conspiracy led by Giovanni Andrea Lampugnani, Gerolamo Olgiati, Carlo Visconti and Cola Montano to overthrow the tyranny of Galeazzo Maria Sforza, killed on 26 December 1476 in Santo Stefano church in Milan.

As reported in a 5 January 1830 letter by the artist, the work was commissioned in 1823 by Teresa Borri, widow of count Stefano Decio Stampa and future wife of Alessandro Manzoni, though (as recorded by Defendente Sacchi) it was only completed in 1826 in place of a Portrait of the Borri Stampa Family which had not met with the commissioner's approval. It appeared in the Piccolo inventario dei dipinti at the villa di Lesa with the title "A canvas representing an episode in the History of Milan", before entering the collection of Manzoni's stepson Stefano Stampa, from whom it was then acquired by its present owner.

Hayez himself chose the then little-known subject, having found it in Alessandro Verri's 1779 tragedy La congiura di Cola Montano and by his reading of Niccolò Machiavelli's Histories, specifically a section of the latter entitled "Segretario Fiorentino Libro Settimo delle Istorie" – that title appears in his notes and shows that Histories was his main source. The highly theatrical composition places Montano in the foreground, kneeling at the foot of a statue of Saint Ambrose (never actually in Santo Stefano but included for a narrative purpose), perhaps praying for his protection. The three younger conspirators are shown in a diagonal alongside the statue's base, daggers ready to kill the tyrant.

The style and ideology of the painting both draw on the ideas and ferments of its time. Hayez also reinvents Santo Stefano in a Roman-Gothic form, obscured by baroque additions by Hayez's time, an (albeit imaginative) reconstruction of the church's earlier appearance and probably intended as a response to the concept of 'in style' restoration, that is, restoring a building's absolute initial appearance without later additions – the main proponent of such restoration was Eugène Viollet-le-Duc). It also draws on the ideological ferments of the early 19th century, opaquely but decisively dressing Risorgimento ideas in a glorification of the "myth of the Carbonara youth".
