= Franzone =

Franzone (died 2 January 1477) was a servant of the Lampugnani family of Milan, and a figure in the assassination of Galeazzo Maria Sforza, the Duke of Milan.

Franzone was a servant to Giovanni Andrea Lampugnani, the head conspirator in a plot to assassinate the Milanese Duke.

Little is known about his life up to the assassination, in which Franzone was on hand in the Church of Santo Stefano, along with the three assassins and about thirty other supporters.

When the Duke's procession arrived at Mass, Lampugnani and the two other assassins (Gerolamo Olgiati and Carlo Visconti) stepped before the Duke, Lampugnani going down on one knee. After a brief exchange of words, Lampugnani rose suddenly, stabbing the Duke in the groin and chest. Soon he was joined by Franzone, Visconti and Olgiati. As the Duke bled to death in the church, one witness claims that Franzone plunged his hands directly into the flowing blood.

In the pandemonium that immediately ensued, Franzone made his escape, as did all the other assassins except Lampugnani, who was killed. Franzone was found the next day, however, given away by his stockings which displayed the Lampugnani colours. Summarily tortured, he gave up the identities of Visconti and Olgiati, and the three were publicly executed on 2 January 1477. The bodies of the three men were torn from groin to neck and affixed to the gates of Milan as a warning to others; the heads were separated and displayed on lances on the city's belltower.
