= 1534 =

1534 in various calendars
- Gregorian calendar: 1534; MDXXXIV
- Ab urbe condita: 2287
- Armenian calendar: 983; ԹՎ ՋՁԳ
- Assyrian calendar: 6284
- Balinese saka calendar: 1455–1456
- Bengali calendar: 940–941
- Berber calendar: 2484
- English Regnal year: 25 Hen. 8 – 26 Hen. 8
- Buddhist calendar: 2078
- Burmese calendar: 896
- Byzantine calendar: 7042–7043
- Chinese calendar: 癸巳年 (Water Snake); 4231 or 4024 — to — 甲午年 (Wood Horse); 4232 or 4025
- Coptic calendar: 1250–1251
- Discordian calendar: 2700
- Ethiopian calendar: 1526–1527
- Hebrew calendar: 5294–5295
- Hindu calendars
- Vikram Samvat: 1590–1591
- Shaka Samvat: 1455–1456
- Kali Yuga: 4634–4635
- Holocene calendar: 11534
- Igbo calendar: 534–535
- Iranian calendar: 912–913
- Islamic calendar: 940–941
- Japanese calendar: Tenbun 3 (天文３年)
- Javanese calendar: 1452–1453
- Julian calendar: 1534; MDXXXIV
- Korean calendar: 3867
- Minguo calendar: 378 before ROC 民前378年
- Nanakshahi calendar: 66
- Thai solar calendar: 2076–2077
- Tibetan calendar: ཆུ་མོ་སྦྲུལ་ལོ་ (female Water-Snake); 1660 or 1279 or 507 — to — ཤིང་ཕོ་རྟ་ལོ་ (male Wood-Horse); 1661 or 1280 or 508

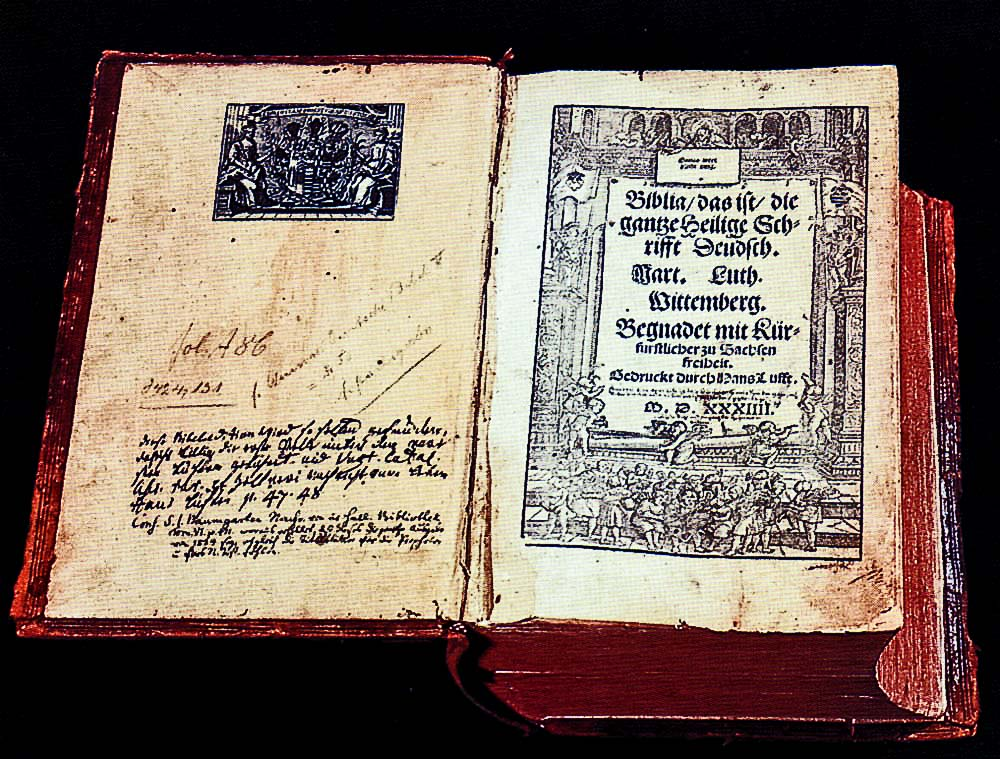
October 4: Martin Luther's complete translation of the Bible into German goes on sale at Wittenberg.

The Church of England separates from the Roman Catholic Church

Year 1534 (MDXXXIV) was a common year starting on Thursday of the Julian calendar.

== Events ==
=== January–March ===
- January 15 – The Parliament of England passes the Act Respecting the Oath to the Succession, recognising the marriage of Henry VIII and Anne Boleyn, and their children as the legitimate heirs to the throne.
- February 23 – A group of Anabaptists, led by Jan Matthys, seize Münster, Westphalia and declare it The New Jerusalem, begin to exile dissenters, and forcibly baptize all others.
- March 10 – The Portuguese crown divides Colonial Brazil into fifteen donatory captaincies, hereditary titles similar to duchies.
- March 30 – The Submission of the Clergy Act 1533 becomes law in England, requiring submission of the clergy, that is, churchmen are to submit to the king and the publication of ecclesiastical laws without royal permission is forbidden.

=== April–June ===
- April 5 (Easter Sunday) – Anabaptist Jan Matthys is killed by the Landsknechte, who laid siege to Münster on the day he predicted as the Second Coming of Christ. His follower John of Leiden takes control of the city.
- April 13 – Sir Thomas More, having been brought before a royal commission to swear his allegiance to the Act of Succession, testifies that he accepts Parliament's right to declare Anne Boleyn the legitimate Queen of England, but denies that the marriage is spiritually valid of the king's second marriage". Holding fast to the Roman Catholic doctrine of papal supremacy, More refuses to take the oath of supremacy toward King Henry VIII. More is confined in the Tower of London. He will be executed on July 6, 1535.
- May 10 – Jacques Cartier explores Newfoundland, while searching for the Northwest Passage.
- June 9 – Jacques Cartier and his crew become the first Europeans to discover the Gulf of St Lawrence.
- June 23 – Copenhagen opens its gates to Count Christopher of Oldenburg, leading the army of Lübeck (and the Hanseatic League), nominally in the interests of the deposed King Christian II of Denmark. The surrenders of Copenhagen and, a few days later, of Malmö represent the high point of the Count's War for the forces of the League. These victories presumably lead the Danish nobility to recognize Christian III as King on July 4.
- June 29 – Jacques Cartier discovers Prince Edward Island.

=== July–September ===
- July 4 – The Election of Christian III, as King of Denmark, takes place in the town of Rye.
- July 7 – The first known exchange between Europeans and the natives of the Gulf of St. Lawrence occurs in what is now New Brunswick.
- July 20 – Cambridge University Press is given a Royal Charter by Henry VIII of England, and becomes the first of the privileged presses.
- August 15 – Ignatius of Loyola and six others take the vows that lead to the establishment of the Jesuits (the Society of Jesus), in Montmartre, near Paris.
- August 26 – Piero de Ponte becomes the 45th Grandmaster of the Knights Hospitaller.
- September 24– The first of Brazil's capitancias, the Capitancy of Pernambuco, is established for Pernambuco.

=== October–December ===
- October 4 – As the Michaelmas fair opens in Wittenberg, Martin Luther's translation of the complete Christian Bible into German is offered for sale for the first time. The work, printed on 1,824 pages in two volumes by Hans Lufft adds the Old Testament including the deuterocanonical books to Luther's 1522 translation of the New Testament, and includes woodcut illustrations.
- October 13 – Cardinal Alessandro Farnese is elected as the 220th pope of the Roman Catholic Church after a two-day conclave to find a successor for Pope Clement VII, who had died on September 25. Farnese, the Bishop of Ostia, takes the name Pope Paul III and is crowned on November 3.
- October 18 – Huguenots post placards all over France attacking the Catholic Mass, provoking a violent sectarian reaction (Affair of the Placards).
- November 3– The English Reformation Parliament passes the Act of Supremacy, establishing Henry VIII as supreme head of the Church of England.
- December 4 – The Ottoman army under Suleiman the Magnificent captures the city of Baghdad from the Safavids without a struggle, beginning almost 400 years of Ottoman rule of what is now Iraq.
- December 6 – Over 200 Spanish settlers, led by conquistador Sebastián de Belalcázar, found what becomes Quito, Ecuador.

=== Date unknown ===
- Manco Inca Yupanqui is crowned as Sapa Inca in Cusco, Peru by Spanish conquistador Francisco Pizarro, in succession to his brother Túpac Huallpa (d. October 1533).
- Gargantua is published by François Rabelais.
- The first book in Yiddish is printed (in Kraków), Mirkevet ha-Mishneh, a Tanakh concordance by Rabbi Asher Anchel, translating difficult phrases in biblical Hebrew.

== Births ==
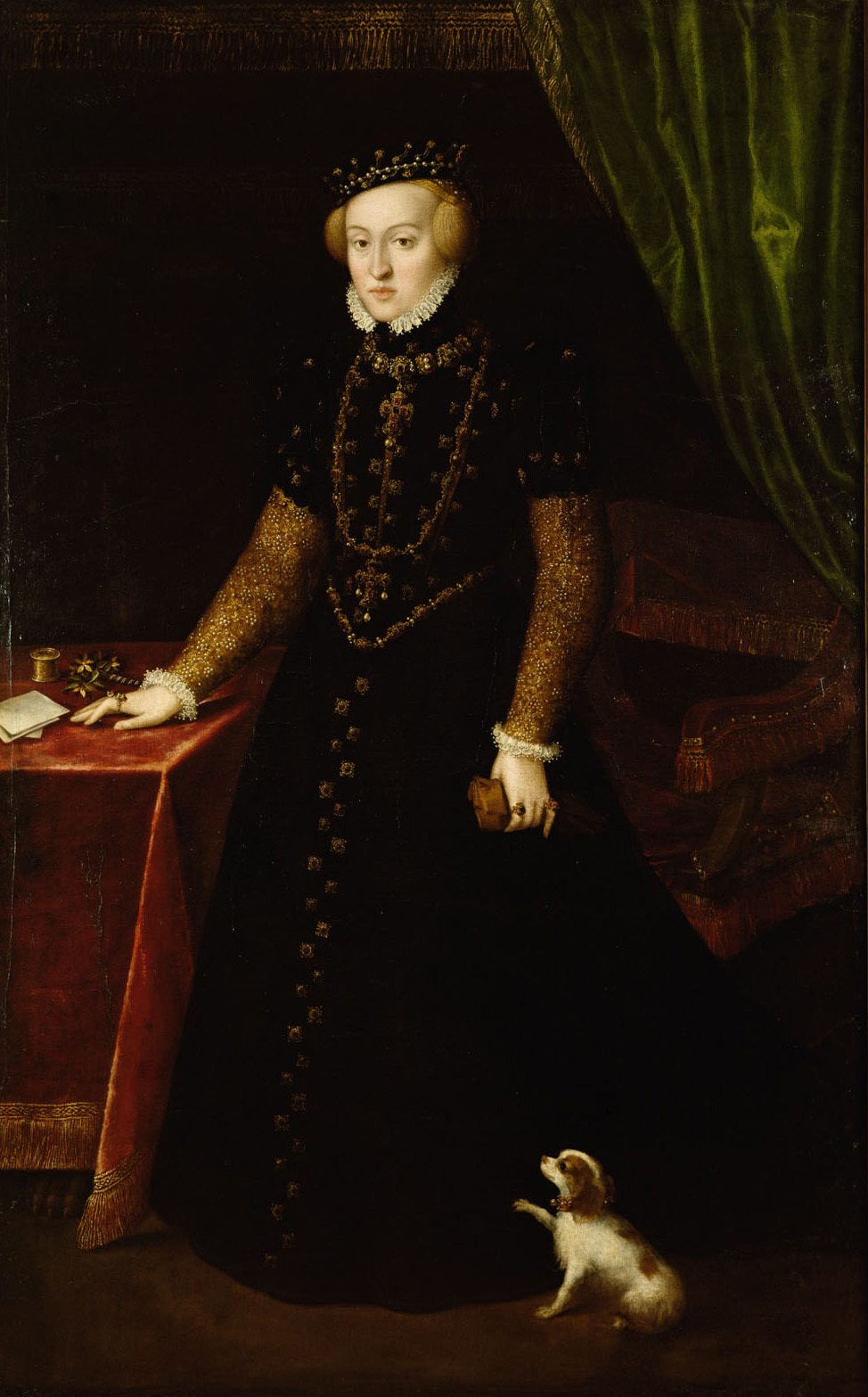
Archduchess Eleanor of Austria

- January 6 – Pavao Skalić, Croatian encyclopedist, Renaissance humanist and adventurer (d. 1575)
- February 5 – Giovanni de' Bardi, Italian writer, composer and soldier (d. 1612)
- February 10 – Song Ikp'il, Korean scholar (d. 1599)
- March 19 – José de Anchieta, Spanish Jesuit missionary in Brazil (d. 1597)
- April 18 – William Harrison, English clergyman (d. 1593)
- June 15 – Henri de Montmorency, 3rd Duke of Montmorency, Marshal of France (d. 1614)
- June 23 – Oda Nobunaga, Japanese warlord (d. 1582)
- July 1 – King Frederick II of Denmark (d. 1588)
- July 3 – Myeongjong of Joseon, ruler of Korea (d. 1567)
- July 18 – Zacharius Ursinus, German theologian (d. 1583)
- August 29 – Nicholas Pieck, Dutch Franciscan friar and martyr (d. 1572)
- September 24 – Guru Ram Das, fourth Sikh Guru (d. 1581)
- October 4 – William I, Count of Schwarzburg-Frankenhausen (d. 1597)
- October 18 – Jean Passerat, French writer (d. 1602)
- November 2 – Archduchess Eleanor of Austria (d. 1594)
- November 6 – Joachim Camerarius the Younger, German scientist (d. 1598)
- November 17 – Karl I, Prince of Anhalt-Zerbst, German prince (d. 1561)
- November 26 – Henry Berkeley, 7th Baron Berkeley (d. 1613)
- December 16 – Lucas Osiander the Elder, German pastor (d. 1604)
- December 16 – Hans Bol, Flemish artist (d. 1593)
- date unknown
  - Lodovico Agostini, Italian composer (d. 1590)
  - Isaac Luria, Jewish scholar and mystic (d. 1572)
  - Henry Herbert, 2nd Earl of Pembroke, statesman of the Elizabethan era (d. 1601)
  - Paul Skalić, Croatian encyclopedist, humanist and adventurer (d. 1573)
  - Joan Waste, English Protestant martyr (d. 1556)
  - Lautaro, Mapuche warrior (d. 1557)

== Deaths ==
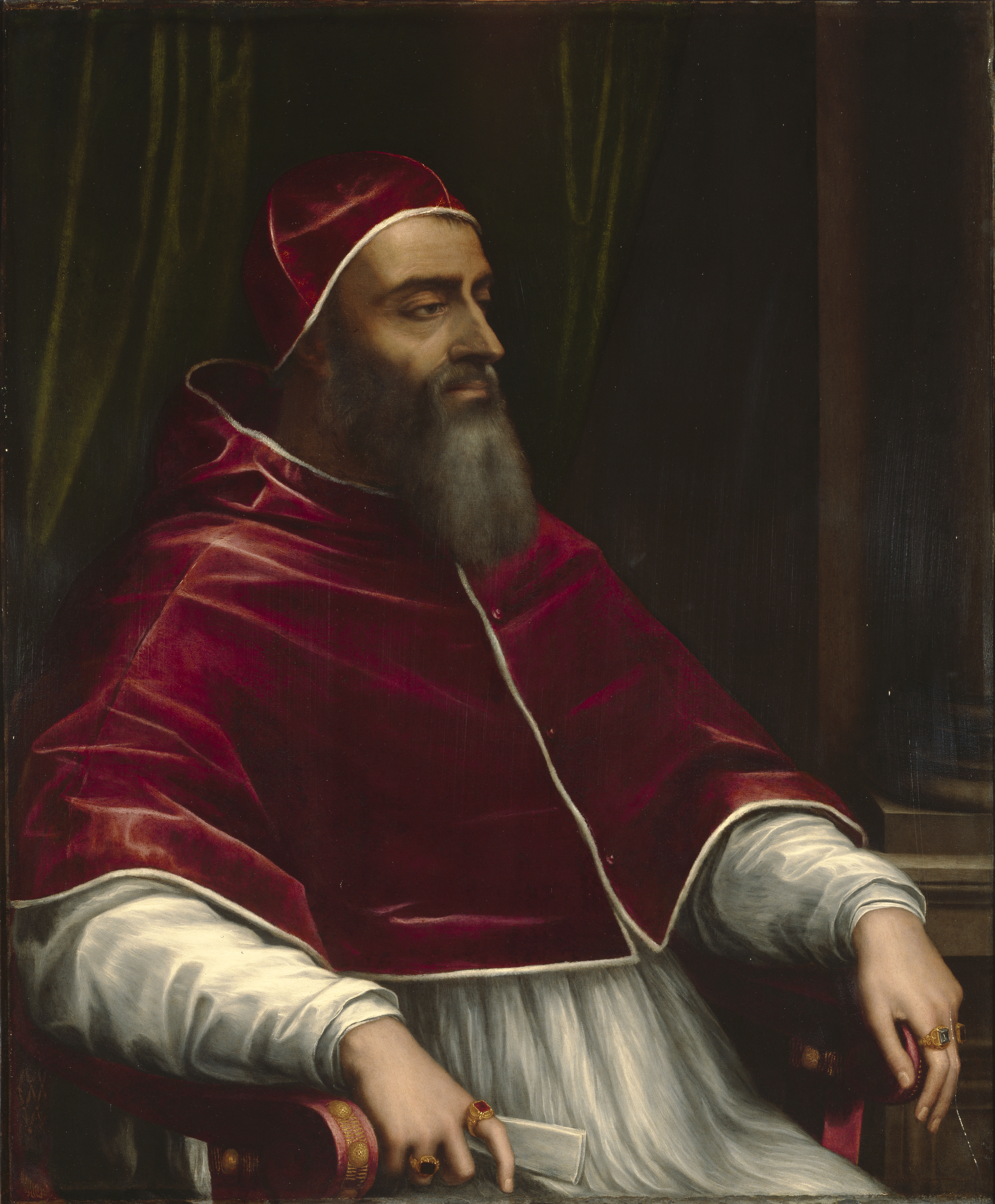
Pope Clement VII

- January 9 – Johannes Aventinus, Bavarian historian and philologist (b. 1477)
- January 25 – Magdalena of Saxony (b. 1507)
- February 15 – Barbara Jagiellon, duchess consort of Saxony and Margravine consort of Meissen (1500–1534) (b. 1478)
- March 5 – Antonio da Correggio, Italian painter (b. 1489)
- March 17 – Vojtěch I of Pernstein, Bohemian nobleman (b. 1490)
- March 19 – Michael Weiße, German theologian (b. c. 1488)
- April 5 – Jan Matthys, German Anabaptist reformer
- April 16 – Kemalpaşazâde, Ottoman historian (b. 1468)
- April 20 – Elizabeth Barton, English prophet and nun (executed) (b. 1506)
- May 3 – Juana de la Cruz Vázquez Gutiérrez, Spanish abbess of the Franciscan Third Order Regular (b. 1481)
- June 14 – Chaitanya Mahaprabhu, Bengali mystic (b. 1486)
- June 27 – Hille Feicken, Dutch Anabaptist
- August 3 – Andrea della Valle, Italian Catholic cardinal (b. 1463)
- August 9 – Thomas Cajetan, Italian theologian and cardinal (b. 1470)
- August 21 – Philippe Villiers de L'Isle-Adam, 44th Grandmaster of the Knights Hospitaller (b. 1464)
- September 7 – Lazarus Spengler, German hymnwriter (b. 1479)
- September 24 – Michael Glinski, Lithuanian prince (b. c. 1470)
- September 25 – Pope Clement VII (b. 1478)
- October 31 – Alfonso I d'Este, Duke of Ferrara (b. 1476)
- November 7 – Ferdinand of Portugal, Duke of Guarda and Trancoso, Portuguese nobleman (b. 1507)
- November 8 – William Blount, 4th Baron Mountjoy, scholar and patron (b. c. 1478)
- November 23 – Beatriz Galindo, Spanish Latinist and scholar (b. 1465)
- December 9 – Balthasar of Hanau-Münzenberg, German nobleman (b. 1508)
- December 27 – Antonio da Sangallo the Elder, Florentine architect (b. 1453)
- date unknown
  - István Báthory, Hungarian noble (b. 1477)
  - Edward Guildford, Lord Warden of the Cinque Ports (b. 1474)
  - Cesare Hercolani, Italian soldier, murdered (b. 1499)
  - Humphrey Kynaston, English highwayman (b. 1474)
  - Amago Okihisa, Japanese nobleman (b. 1497)
  - John Taylor, English Master of the Rolls (b. 1480)
