= Glycerius (bishop of Milan) =

Archbishop of Milan

- Archbishop of Milan
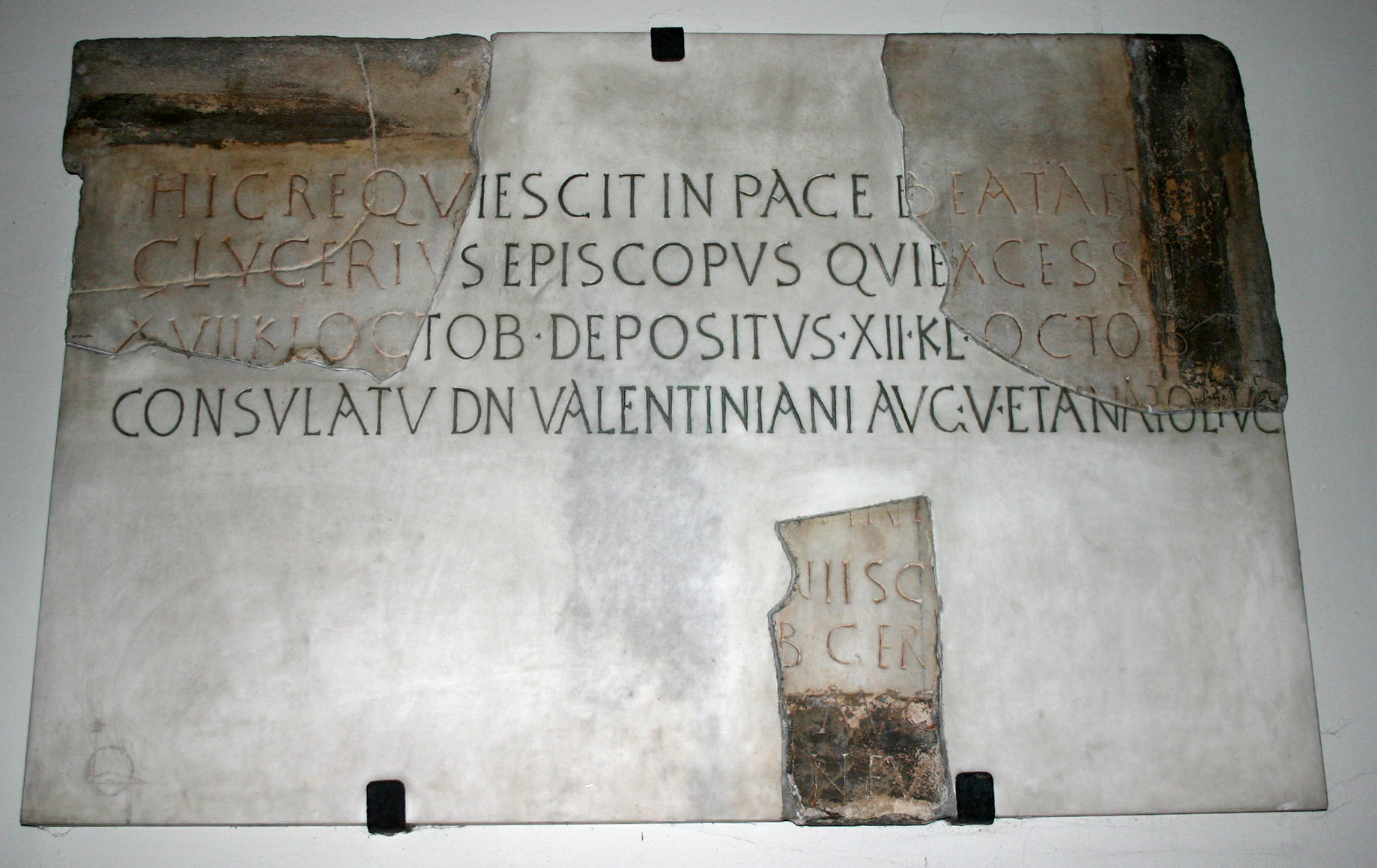
- Epigraph for Glycerius, reconstructed from the fragments of the original stone, in the left-hand transept of Church of Saint Nazarius.
- Appointed: 436 AD
- Term ended: 438 AD
- Predecessor: Martinianus
- Successor: Lazarus

Personal details
- Born: Milan, Italy, Roman Empire
- Died: 15 September 438 AD Milan, Italy, Roman Empire

Sainthood
- Feast day: 20 September Eastern Orthodox Church; Roman Catholic Church

Glycerius (Italian: Glicerio) was Archbishop of Milan from 436 to 438. He is honoured as a Saint in the Catholic Church and Eastern Orthodox Church.

== Life ==
Almost nothing is known about the life and the episcopate of Glycerius. He was a deacon of Milan before being elected as bishop of Milan in 436. He probably had been a tutor of the Western Roman Emperor, Valentinian III, a position that he possibly maintained while he was bishop of Milan. He passed most of his reign in Antioch in Syria.

Glycerius died on 15 September 438 AD, and was buried in the Church of Saint Nazarius and Celsus in Milan. In that church fragments of the funeral epigraph of him have been discovered. His feast day is 20 September.

== Confusion with Emperor Glycerius ==
Saint Glycerius has been erroneously confused as the Glycerius (c. 420 – after 480), who was one of the last of the Western Roman Emperors (reigned 473–474), and who became bishop of Salona after his deposition. Accounts concerning the emperor's later life are mixed:

- According to the chronicler Marcellinus Comes, "The Caesar Glycerius, who held the imperial power at Rome, was deposed from power at the port of Rome by Nepos, son of the sister of the former patrician Marcellinus. From Caesar he was ordained a bishop, and he died."
- John of Antioch and Jordanes both write that Emperor Glycerius became bishop of Salona after Nepos took Rome, captured Glycerius without a fight and, having stripped him of royalty, appointed him to this see.

== See also ==
- Saint Lycerius
