= Giovanni Andrea Lampugnani =

Giovanni Andrea Lampugnani (died 26 December 1476) was a member of the Milanese nobility and an assassin of Galeazzo Maria Sforza, the Duke of Milan.

The Lampugnani family was a high-ranking family in Renaissance Milan, and Giovanni served in several government positions, often working quite closely with the Duke. Under the Duke, Giovanni's brothers leased some valuable land from a rural abbey. Upon the death of the abbot, the inheriting cleric nullified the lease and evicted the Lampugnani brothers from the property. Although the family appealed to the Duke, there was no government intervention on the matter, resulting in utter contempt on the part of Giovanni.

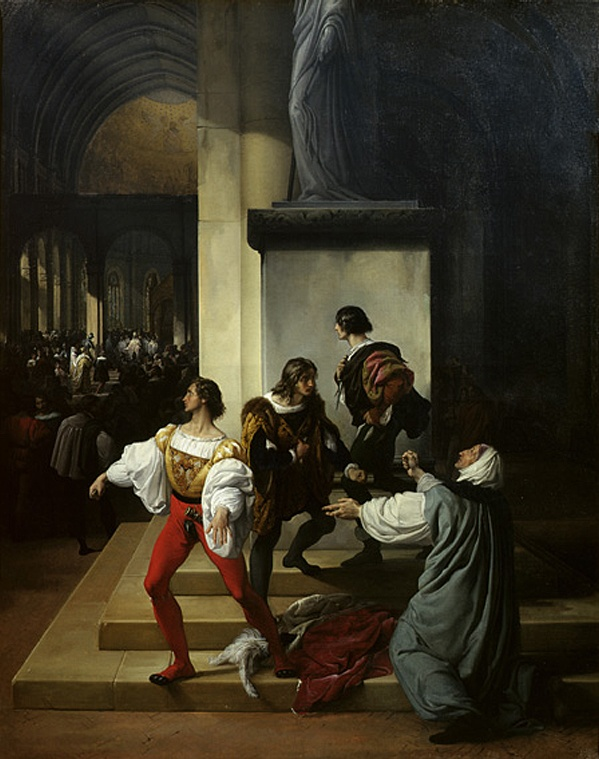
Lampugnani's Conspiracy by Francesco Hayez, 1826

The Duke, although popular as a patron of the arts, was known to be rather ruthless in his rule and something of a womaniser, traits which encouraged more enemies to emerge amongst the government ranks. Two other officials, Carlo Visconti and Gerolamo Olgiati soon joined Giovanni in a conspiracy to assassinate the Duke.

== Assassin ==
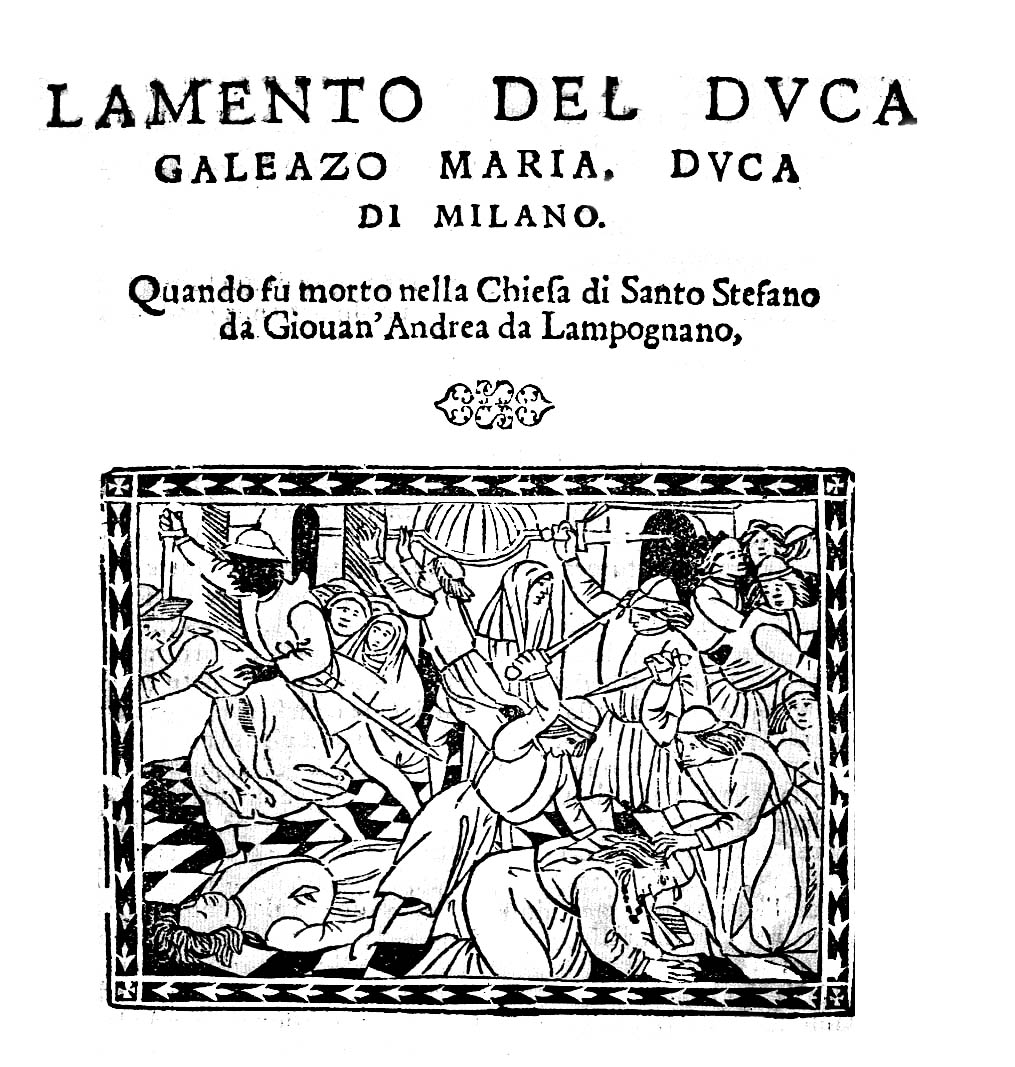
Lament of the duke Galeazzo Maria (1476).

Despite evidence that plotting may have begun as early as 1474, there was little planning on the conspirators' part beyond the actual assassination; no efforts were made to find further outside support amongst any ruling families, nor were getaway plans solidified.

Lampugnani, the leader of the plot, gathered with the other conspirators in the church of Santo Stefano on 26 December 1476 (the day of the martyr, Santo Stefano) to prepare for the assassination. Armed and wearing hidden armour, they convened before Mass in the morning, praying for the saint's protection.

When the Duke's procession arrived, Lampugnani, Visconti and Olgiati stepped before the Duke, Lampugnani going down on one knee. After a brief exchange of words, Lampugnani rose suddenly, stabbing the Duke in the groin and chest. Soon he was joined by Visconti, Olgiati and a servant of Lampugnani's named Franzone, stabbing the Duke to death.

Pandemonium erupted quickly, as the congregation — assassins included — fled the church. Lampugnani, in an attempt to escape, ran to the women's side of the church where he was subsequently caught and killed. His head was severed and, with the heads of other assassins (who were all apprehended and executed within a week), displayed on the belltower as a warning for several years following.

In the days immediately following the Duke's assassination, other Lampugnani family members were arrested on suspicion of compliance and much of their property destroyed by mobs. Most of the remaining Lampugnani fled Milan or were exiled to other cities.
