= Marolus =

Roman Catholic Saint; Archbishop of Milan from 408 to 423

- Archbishop of Milan
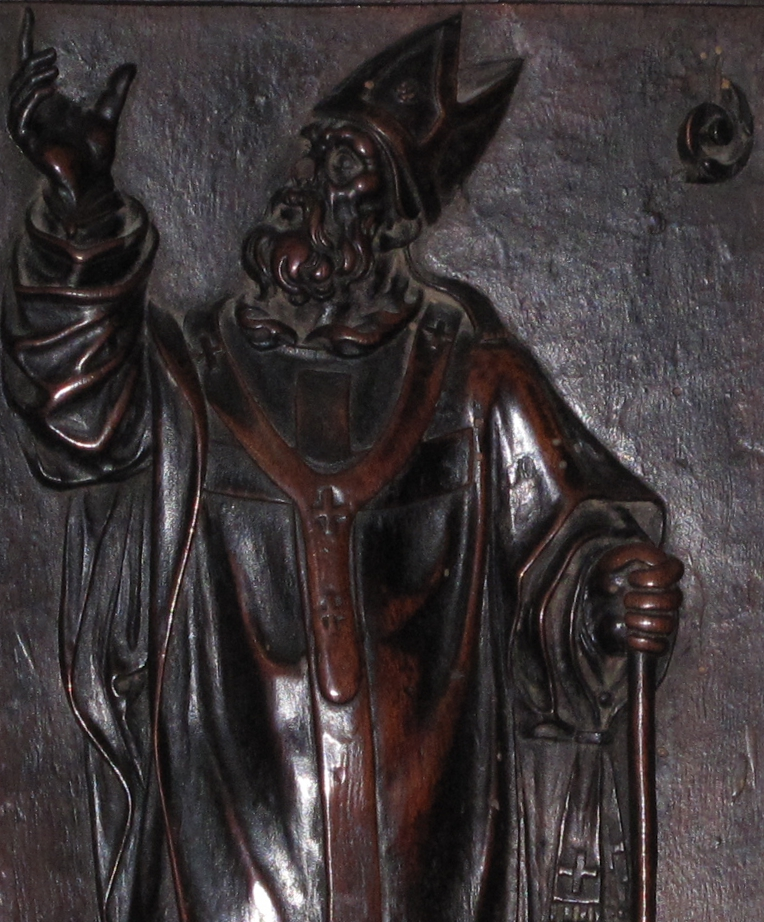
- Appointed: 408 AD
- Term ended: 423 AD
- Predecessor: Venerius
- Successor: Martinianus

Personal details
- Born: Milan, Italy, Roman Empire
- Died: April 23, 423 AD Milan, Italy, Roman Empire

Sainthood
- Feast day: April 23
- Venerated in: Eastern Orthodox Church; Roman Catholic Church

Marolus (Italian: Marolo) was Archbishop of Milan from 408 to 423. He is honored as a Saint in the Catholic Church and his feast day is April 23.

== Life ==
According to the writings of Ennodius, bishop of Pavia in early 6th-century, Marolus was born on the banks of the Tigris in Mesopotamia. Probably due to the persecutions by Shapur II, Marolus moved before 380 to Syria where he grew up. He later moved to Rome, where he became friend of Pope Innocent I, and finally to Milan, where he became the bishop in 408.

Marolus was the bishop of Milan during an invasion of Italy by the Visigoths and he helped the victims of the invasion. He probably brought to Milan from Antioch the relics of saints Babylas of Antioch and Romanus of Caesarea, and he founded a church in Milan known as Basilica Concilia Sanctorum or church of San Romano, today no more extant, near the present church of San Babila.

Marolus died on April 23, 423, and he was buried in the Church of Saint Nazarius and Celsus in Milan.
