= Martinianus (bishop of Milan) =

Archbishop of Milan from 423 to 435

- Archbishop of Milan
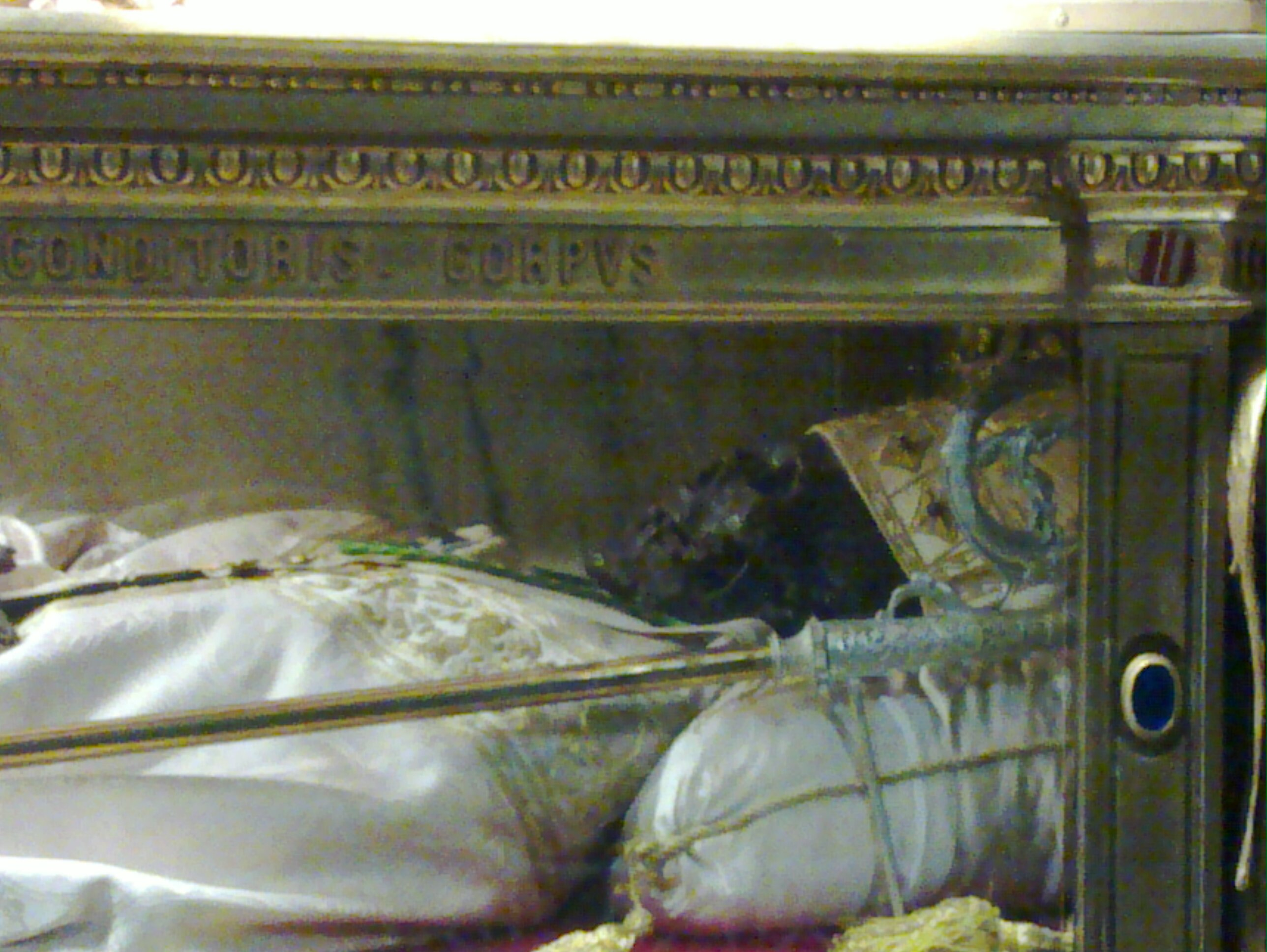
- Relic of Saint Martinianus, Cathedral of Milan
- Appointed: 423 AD
- Term ended: 435 AD
- Predecessor: Marolus
- Successor: Glycerius

Personal details
- Born: c. 4th century AD Milan, Roman Italy, Roman Empire
- Died: 29 December 435 AD Milan, Roman Italy, Roman Empire

Sainthood
- Feast day: 2 January
- Venerated in: Eastern Orthodoxy; Catholicism

Martinianus (or Martinus, Italian: Martiniano) was Archbishop of Milan from 423 to 435. He is honoured as a Saint in the Catholic and Eastern Orthodox Churches. His feast day is 2 January.

== Life ==
A tradition associates Martinianus with the Roman family of the Hosii. According to the writings of Ennodius, bishop of Pavia in early 6th-century, Martinianus was elected bishop of Milan notwithstanding he had no desire for that position due to his humility and fear. He founded two churches in Milan, one of them, possibly founded in 417, was dedicated to both Saint Zechariah and Saint Stephen, and it is now known, after several reconstructions, as Basilica di Santo Stefano Maggiore (or the Basilica of Saint Stephen).

Martinianus is mentioned in a letter by the moderate Nestorian John of Antioch, written in 431 to Rufus, the bishop of Thessalonica. In the letter, John tells Rufus that he had received a letter from the "very godly and holy [Martinianus], bishop of Milan", in which it was related that Martinianus had "sent to the very pious emperor a work by the blessed Ambrose on the incarnation of the Lord", the work now generally known as the treatise, De Incarnationis (full title: De incarnationis dominicae sacramento; transl. 'On the Sacrament of the Lord's Incarnation').

Martinianus died on 29 December 435. His feast day was later postponed to the next 2 January, due to the introduction of the Christmas' octave. Martinianus was buried in the Basilica of Saint Stephen in Milan. In 1988 his body was translated to the Milan Cathedral and buried under the altar of Saint Agatha.
