= Hans Böhm =

German mystic also known as the Drummer of Niklashausen

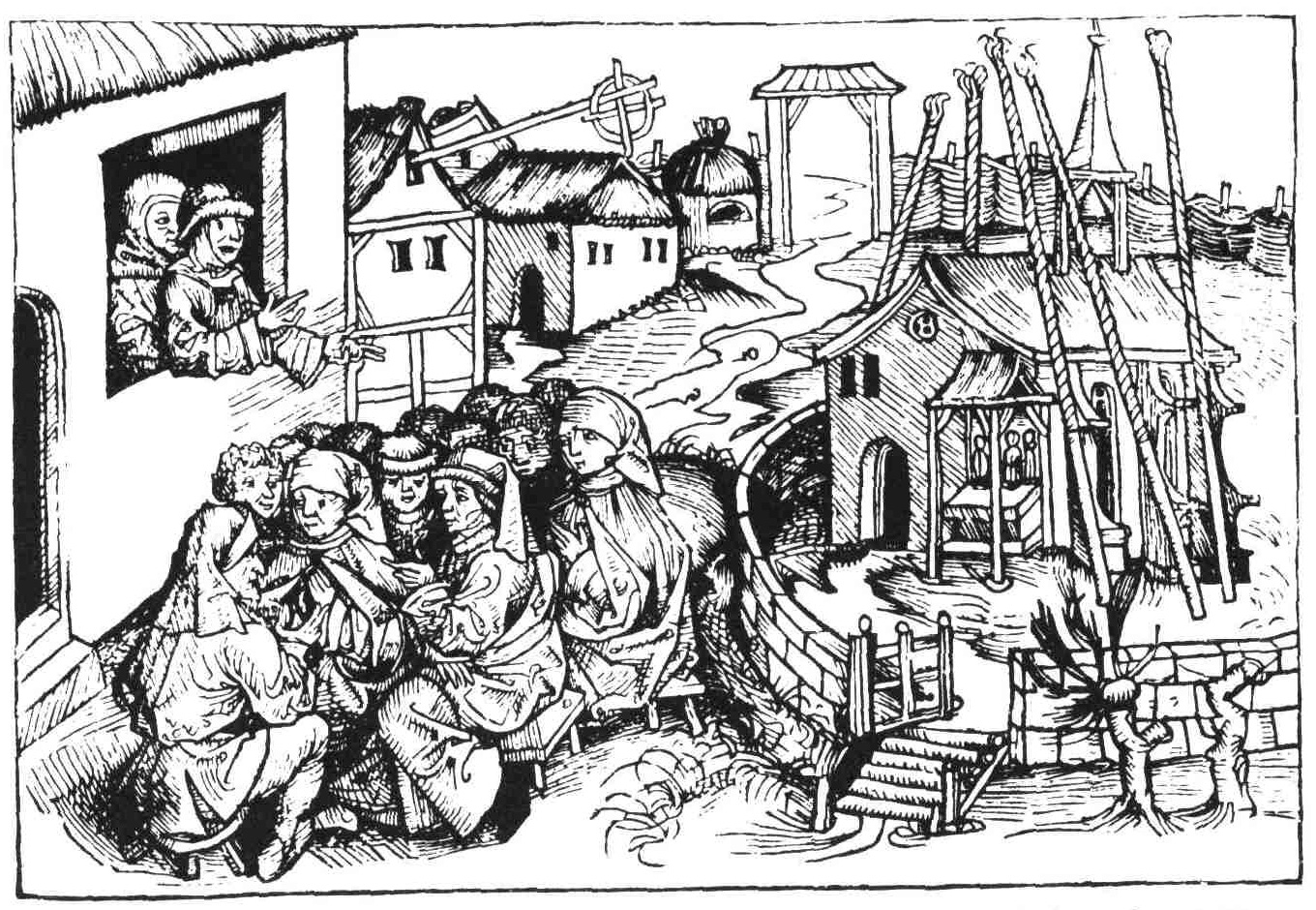
A woodcut, dated 1493, from the Nuremberg Chronicle, which shows Böhm preaching.

Hans Böhm (Note: Variously spelled as Bohm, Behem, Böheim, or Böham) (died July 19, 1476), also known as the Drummer of Niklashausen, was born in the village of Helmstadt in the south-central region of Germany known as Franconia. The year of Böhm's birth is unknown; peasants made little impact in the written historical record. Böhm was a religious revolutionary: his inconspicuous existence changed abruptly.

== Profile ==
Böhm lived in the German town of Niklashausen (present-day Baden-Württemberg), where he made his living as a shepherd and street entertainer. One night in 1476, he had a vision of the Virgin Mary. Böhm's conversations with one of the most powerful and beloved saints inspired him to burn his drum in a medieval ritual known as a bonfire of the vanities. The ritual served as a public demonstration in which people threw their possessions or vanities into a communal bonfire to signify their dependency on God and adherence to the cult of poverty. More importantly, the Virgin Mary's message was one of social equality.

Böhm was to preach on the sins of the clergy: peasants and pilgrims should not pay rents to them, he would eventually call for their deaths. Böhm was also to promote the abolition of forced labor (slavery), tolls, levies and other payments to the nobles. The woods and waters of the earth were to be held in common for the use of all people, rather than just the rich. Böhm's sermons calling for a leveling of society were radical in a hierarchical feudal society. The power brokers of the time, the clergy and nobles, deemed such ideas as dangerous. Thus, when in short order tens of thousands of peasants from all over Germany converged on Niklashausen to hear the "Drummer Boy" speak, the authorities sensed a real and imminent threat. The resulting peasant revolt began in early May 1476 and culminated with Böhm's heresy trial and his execution, on July 19, that year.

== Historical commentary ==
Böhm's story represents the dissatisfaction and resentment of peasants for their physical conditions and demonstrates the only avenue through which they could voice their frustrations: through restructuring religious or spiritual paradigms. Historian Richard Wunderli in his book Peasant Fires provides a detailed study of Böhm and the Niklashausen peasant revolt of 1476 and the abstruse peasant mentality.

What little is known about Böhm is obtained from the surviving historical documents written by his enemies, namely the clergy and nobles, such as Count Johann of Wertheim, Archbishop Dieter von Isenberg of Mainz, and Bishop Rudolf von Scherenberg of Würzburg. The story was chronicled in 1514 by Johannes Trithemius.

== Sources ==
- The New Schaff-Herzog Encyclopedia of Religious Knowledge, Vol. II: Basilica - Chambers.
- Hans Böhm und die Wallfahrt nach Niklashausen im Jahre 1476, C. A. Barack, Würzburg, 1858;
- Reformers before the Reformation, i, 377–392. C. Ullmann, Edinburgh, 1877
- Politische und religiöse Volksbewegungen vor der Reformation, pp. 10 sqq., E. Gothein, Breslau, 1878
- Die religiösen Sekten in Franken vor der Reformation, pp. 57 sqq., H. Haupt, Würzburg, 1882.
- Peasant Fires: The Drummer of Niklashausen, Richard Wunderli, Indiana University Press, 1992

== See also ==
- List of peasant revolts
- List of Marian apparitions
