= Carlo Visconti =

Italian assassin

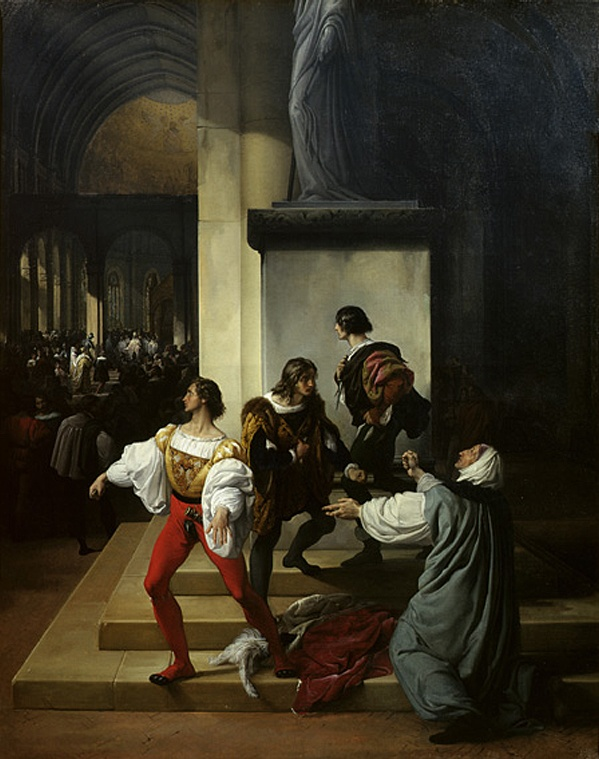
Lampugnani's Conspiracy by Francesco Hayez, 1826

Carlo Visconti (died 2 January 1477) was an Italian nobleman, who was a member of the prominent Visconti family, and a government secretary in Milan's Council of Justice, he was executed for being the assassin of Galeazzo Maria Sforza, the Duke of Milan.

== Biography ==
Visconti was a well-connected official in the Milanese court, and the Duke, although popular as a patron of the arts, was known to be rather ruthless in his rule and something of a womaniser. Visconti believed that the Duke had deflowered his sister, and some time in 1476 entered a conspiracy against the Duke with Giovanni Andrea Lampugnani and Gerolamo Olgiati, two other Milanese officials.

On 26 December 1476, the three conspirators met at the church of Santo Stefano Maggiore, the site where the assassination was to take place. It was also the Saint's day for Santo Stefano, a day chosen especially for this purpose. After praying for the saint's protection, the three waited, along with several supporters and the regular congregation, for the Duke's arrival.

The Duke arrived at the church with a customary procession. When it reached the part of the church where the assassins were, Lampugnani struck the first blow, soon joined by Visconti, Olgiati and a servant of Lampugnani's, all of whom were armed and wearing hidden armour. The Duke died during the attack and everyone - assassins included, quickly fled the church except for Lampugnani who was struck down.

The next day, however, Franzone, the servant of Lampugnani was caught and gave up the identities of the other conspirators. Visconti was caught on 29 December, given up by a frightened relative, and was publicly executed on 2 January 1477 along with Franzone and Olgiati. The bodies of these three men were torn from groin to neck and affixed to the gates of Milan as a warning to others; the heads separated and displayed on lances on the city's belltower.
