= Gerolamo Olgiati =

Italian assassin

- Born: 1453
- Died: 2 January 1477 (aged 23–24); Milan
- Occupation: Government Official
- Known for: Assassin Of Galeazzo Maria Sforza

Gerolamo Olgiati (1453 – 2 January 1477) was a government official in Milan and one of the assassins of Galeazzo Maria Sforza, the Duke of Milan, along with Giovanni Andrea Lampugnani and Carlo Visconti.

Olgiati was the political radical of the conspiracy, bearing no known grudge against the Duke, but rather acting out of Republican ideals. He claimed in a subsequent confession that many of ideas were the product of studying under Cola Montano a Humanist educator who had first suggested the assassination.

The Duke, although popular as a patron of the arts, was known to be somewhat of a tyrant in his rule and made many enemies through his reputation as a womaniser. Olgiati was soon involved in a conspiracy with Lampugnani and Visconti, two older officials who each had more personal reasons to assassinate the Duke.

== Assassin ==
On 26 December 1476, Saint Stephen's Day, the three conspirators met at the church of St. Stephen (Santo Stefano Maggiore), the site where the assassination was to take place. After praying for the saint's protection, the three waited, along with several supporters and the regular congregation, for the Duke's arrival.

The Duke arrived at the church with a customary procession. When it reached the part of the church where the assassins were, Lampugnani struck the first blow, soon joined by Visconti, Olgiati and a servant of Lampugnani's, all of whom were armed and wearing hidden armour. The Duke died during the attack and everyone - assassins included, quickly fled the church except for Lampugnani who was struck down.

The next day, however, Franzone, the servant of Lampugnani was caught and gave up the identities of the other conspirators. Olgiati was apprehended on 30 December, given up by, amongst others, his own father, who denounced his son as a traitor. After a summary confession, Olgiati was publicly executed on 2 January 1477, along with Franzone and Visconti. The bodies of these three men were torn from groin to neck and affixed to the gates of Milan as a warning to others; the heads separated and displayed on lances on the city's belltower. Throughout his execution Olgiati maintained that the assassination was morally justified — he exclaimed "Courage, Gerolamo! you will long be remembered; death is bitter but glory is eternal."
