= Niklashausen =

District in the German municipality of Werbach

Coordinates: 49°42′12″N 9°36′57″E

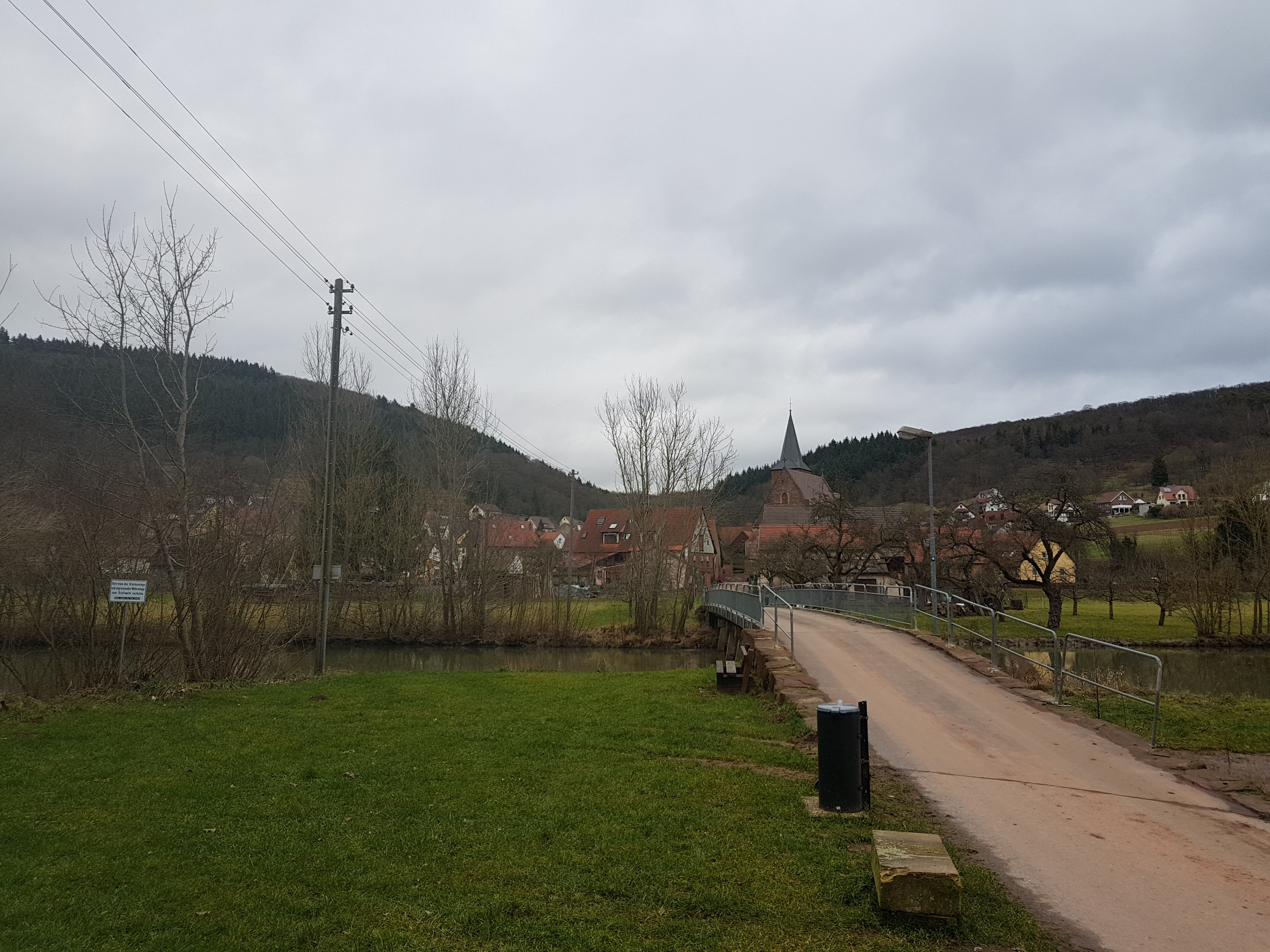

Niklashausen is a district in the German municipality of Werbach, located in the federal state of Baden-Württemberg at the border to Bavaria, Germany. The regional dialect spoken by people in Niklashausen is East Franconian.

== Geographical location ==
Werbach with its district Niklashausen is located in the Taubertal between Tauberbischofsheim, Wertheim (Main) and Würzburg.

== History ==
In the 15th century, Hans Böhm became famous as the Drummer of Niklashausen.
