= Cola Montano =

Italian writer and humanist scholar

- Nicola Capponi
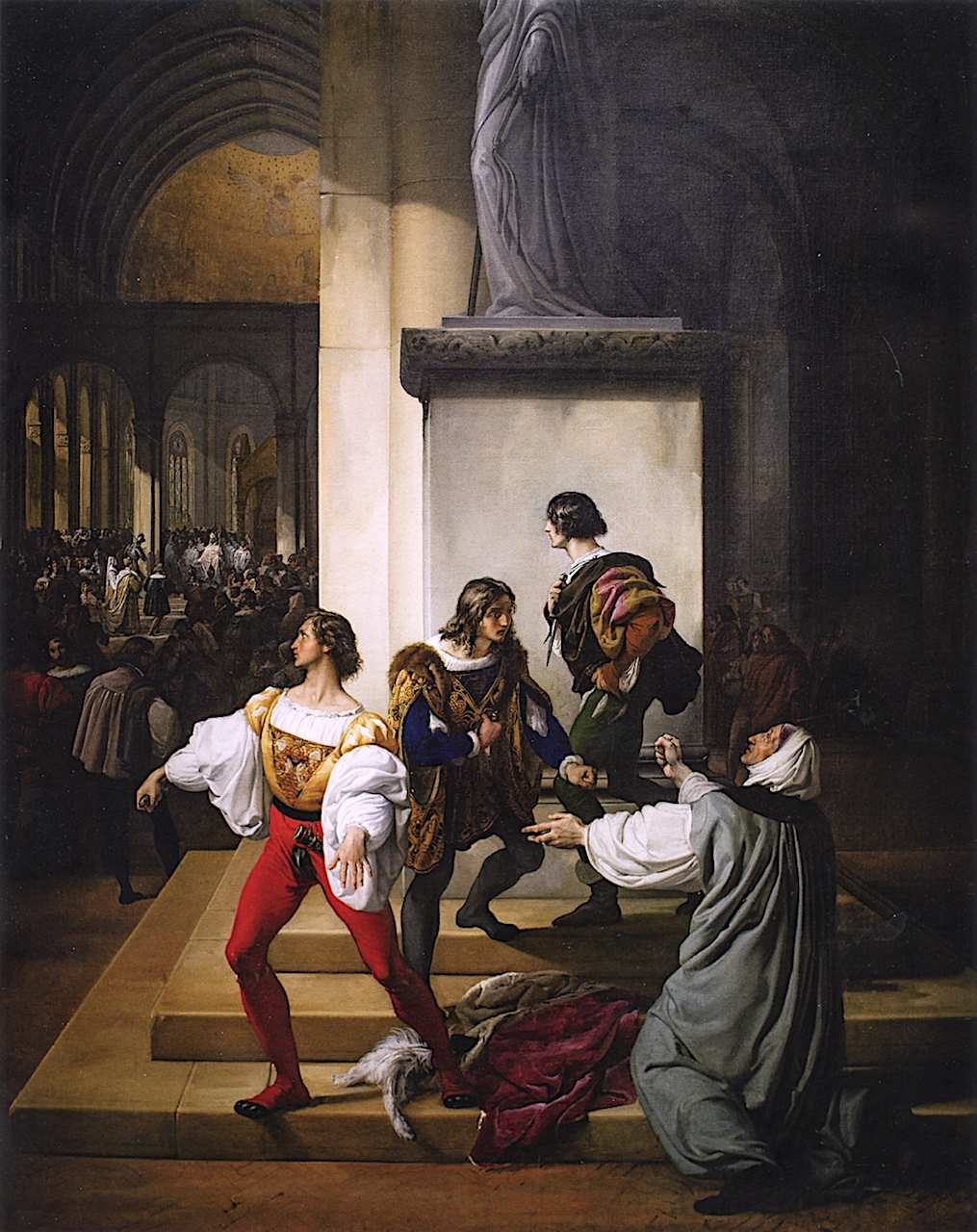
- Francesco Hayez: The Lampugnani Conspiracy
- Born: c. 1440; Gaggio Montano, Bologna, Papal States
- Died: 13 March 1482 (aged 41–42); Florence, Republic of Florence
- Occupation: Renaissance humanist

Academic work
- Discipline: Latin literature
- Notable students: Galeazzo Maria Sforza

Cola Montano, also known as Nicola Capponi, (c. 1440 – 13 March 1482) was an Italian writer and humanist scholar who helped incite the Congiura dei Lampugnani or Conspiracy of the Lampugnani that succeeded in murdering the Duke of Milan, Galeazzo Maria Sforza. While not present at the murder, Cola Montano was captured by the Lorenzo de' Medici government of Tuscany, and hanged from a window in the Bargello.

== Biography ==
Nicola Capponi was born in Gaggio Montano near Bologna. By 1462, he had been named professor of Latin for the public school of Milan. Among his students was the jurist Pietro Grassi. But it is also reputed that Cola taught Latin to much of the Milanese aristocracy, including the future Duke Galeazzo himself.

Cola was active in sponsoring printers of various Latin classics, but appeared to have fleeting collaborations with the businesses.

After the murder of the Duke, one of the conspirators, Girolamo Olgiati, rapidly fingered his teacher Cola as fostering the murder. Cola had not been present in Milan at the time but was in Tuscany. Many reasons have been postulated for Cola's impetus to murder the Duke. Some have pointed that he had a wish to revert Milan to a republic and replicate the Ancient Roman precedents of tyrannicide. Cola, by nature, appears to have been prone to bicker. He apparently had twice been jailed, one for writing satires about another Sforza tutor and the other time accused of raping a young woman. He is said to have been physically assaulted or publicly whipped by Galeazzo for the former infraction.

== Note ==
- Translated in part from Italian Wikipedia entry.

== Bibliography ==
- Argelati, Filippo (1745). Bibliotheca Scriptorum Mediolanensium. Vol. I. Milan. pp. 96, 158, 447, 456.
- Biscaro, Gerolamo (1915). "Panfilo Castaldi e gli inizi dell'arte della stampa a Milano (1469-1472)". Archivio storico lombardo. I: 85.
- Daniels, Tobias (2015). Umanesimo, congiure e propaganda politica. Cola Montano e l'Oratio ad Lucenses. Con edizione e traduzione dell'Oratio e delle Confessioni di Cola Montano e Piero Baldinotti. RR inedita. Rome: Roma nel Rinascimento.
- Fantuzzi, Giovanni (1787). Notizie degli scrittori bolognesi. Vol. VI. Bologna: Stamp. di S. Tommaso d'Aquino. pp. 64–66.
- Lorenzi, Girolamo (1875). Cola Montano, studio storico. Milan: Pio Istituto Tipografico.
- Motta, Emilio (1898). "Di Filippo di Lavagna e di alcuni altri tipografi editori del Quattrocento". Archivio storico lombardo. X: 28.
- Orvieto, Paolo (1976). "CAPPONI, Nicola, detto Cola Montano". Dizionario Biografico degli Italiani (in Italian). Vol. 19: Cappi–Cardona. Rome: Istituto dell'Enciclopedia Italiana. ISBN 978-88-12-00032-6.
