= Galeazzo Maria Sforza =

Fifth Duke of Milan (1444–1476)

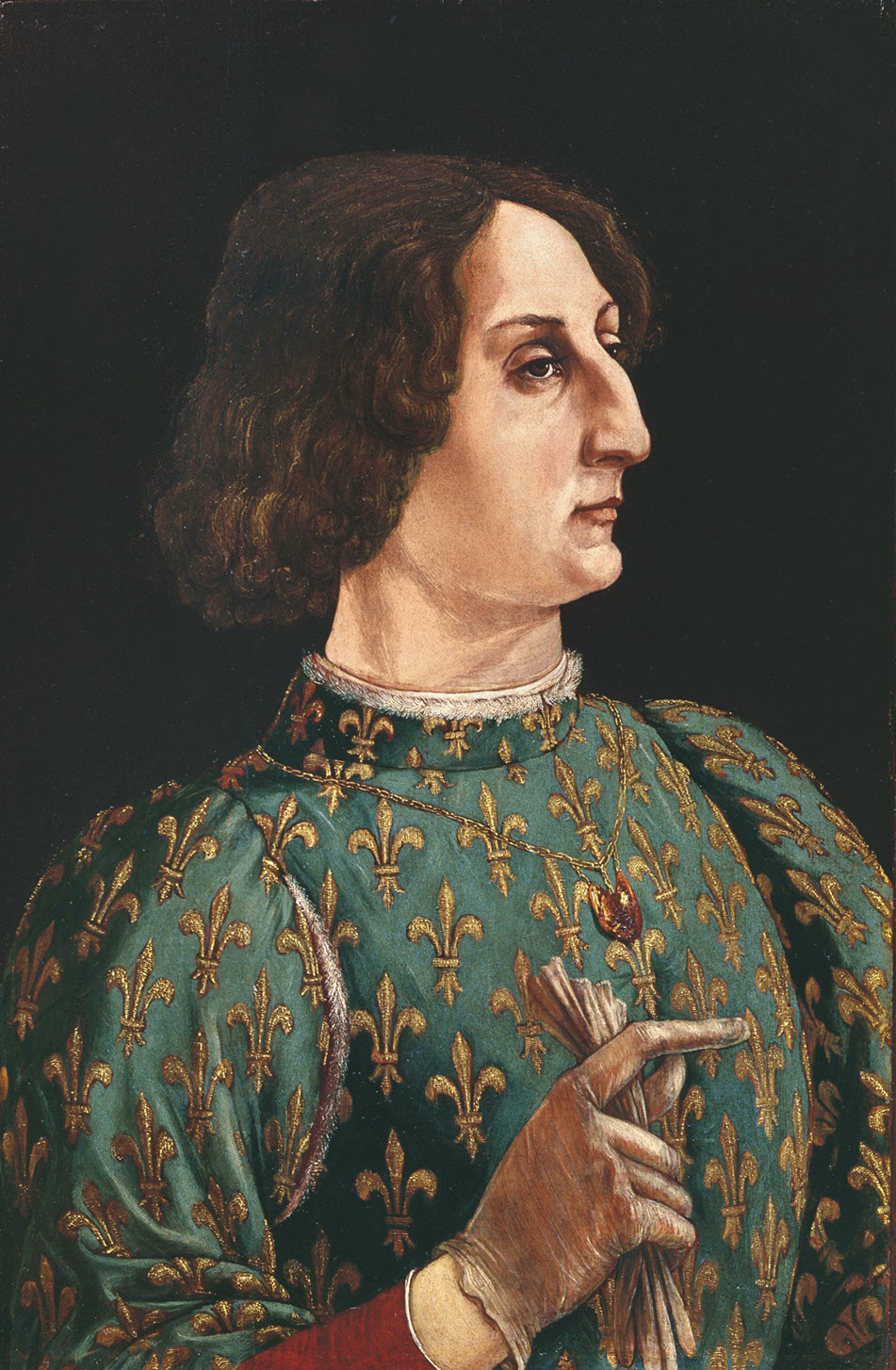
- Galeazzo Sforza, by Piero Benci, Uffizi Gallery

Duke of Milan
- Reign: 20 March 1466 – 26 December 1476
- Predecessor: Francesco I Sforza
- Successor: Gian Galeazzo Sforza
- Born: 24 January 1444; Commune of Fermo
- Died: 26 December 1476 (aged 32); Milan, Duchy of Milan (now in modern-day Italy)
- Spouse: Bona of Savoy (m. 1468)
- Issue among others details: Gian Galeazzo, Duke of Milan; Ermes, Marquis of Tortona; Bianca Maria, Holy Roman Empress; Anna, Hereditary Princess of Ferrara; Illegitimate: Caterina, Countess of Forlì; Ottaviano Maria, Bishop of Lodi; Chiara, Countess dal Verme
- House: Sforza
- Father: Francesco I Sforza
- Mother: Bianca Maria Visconti

Galeazzo Maria Sforza (24 January 1444 – 26 December 1476) was the fifth Duke of Milan from 1466 until 1476. He was born to Francesco Sforza, a popular condottiero and ally of Cosimo de' Medici who would gain the Duchy of Milan in 1450, and Bianca Maria Visconti, Duchess of Milan in her own right. Sforza was betrothed into the Gonzaga family; after the engagement with Dorotea Gonzaga was called off, he married Bona of Savoy.

== Life ==
Galeazzo Maria Sforza was born in Fermo, near the family's castle of Girifalco. He was the first son of Francesco Sforza and Bianca Maria Visconti, the sole heiress of the Duchy of Milan. At the death of his father on 8 March 1466, Sforza was in France heading a military expedition to help King Louis XI against Charles I of Burgundy. Called back home by his mother, Sforza returned to Italy under a false name as he had to pass by the territories of the family's enemy, the Duke of Savoy, who made an unsuccessful attempt on Sforza's life. He entered Milan on 20 March 1466, and was acclaimed by the populace.

In his first years as the Duke of Milan, Sforza and his mother ruled jointly, but he later expelled her from Milan.

== Patronage ==
Sforza was famous as a patron of music. Under his direction, financial backing and encouragement, his chapel grew into one of the most famous and historically significant musical ensembles in Europe. Composers from the north, especially the Franco-Flemish composers from the present-day Low Countries, came to sing in his chapel and write masses, motets and secular music for him.

== Assassination ==
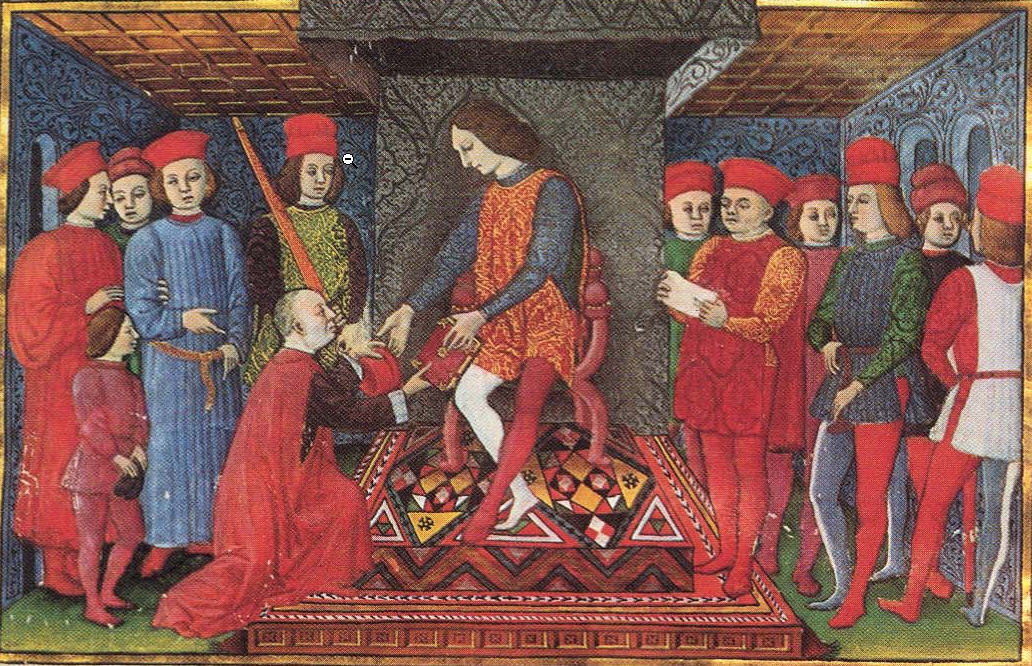
Galeazzo Maria Sforza, c. 1464

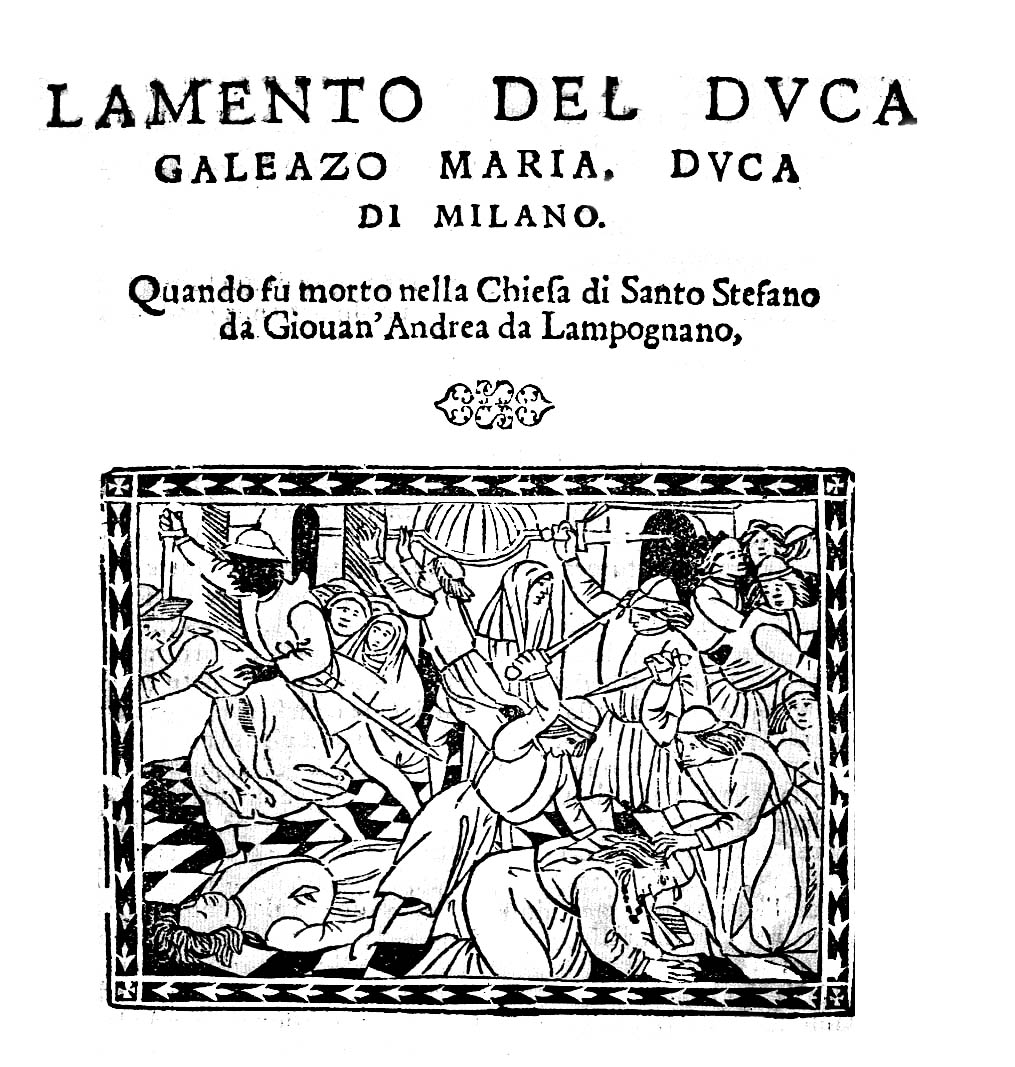
Lament of the duke Galeazzo Maria (1476)

Three principal assassins were involved in Galeazzo Sforza's death: Carlo Visconti, Gerolamo Olgiati, and Giovanni Andrea Lampugnani, all fairly high-ranking officials at the Milanese court.

Lampugnani, descended from Milanese nobility, was recognized as the leader of the conspiracy. His motives were based primarily on a falling out with the duke.

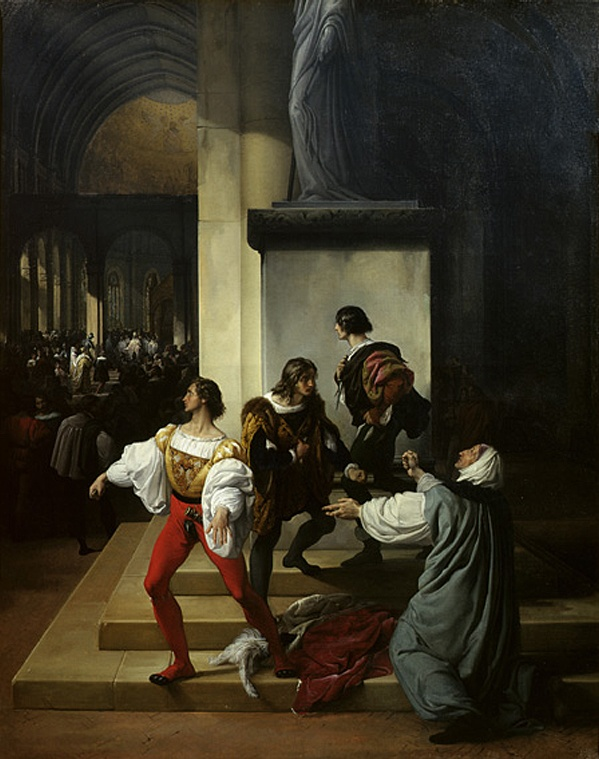
Lampugnani's Conspiracy by Francesco Hayez, 1826

After carefully studying Sforza's movements, the three conspirators made their move on the feast day of Saint Stephen, the patron saint of Santo Stefano where the assassination was to be committed. Supported by about thirty friends, they waited in the church for the duke to arrive for mass. When Galeazzo Sforza arrived, Lampugnani knelt before him; after some words were exchanged, he rose suddenly and stabbed Sforza in the groin and breast. Olgiati and Visconti soon joined in, as did a servant of Lampugnani's.

Sforza fell dead within a matter of seconds. All the assassins quickly escaped, save for Lampugnani, who became entangled in some of the church's cloth and was killed by a guard. His body soon fell into the hands of a mob, which dragged the corpse through the streets, slashing and beating at it; they then hung the body upside-down outside Lampugnani's house. The beheaded corpse was cut down the next day, and the "sinning" right hand was removed, burnt, and put on display in an act of symbolism.

=== Aftermath of assassination ===
Despite the initial public reaction, the government brought swift justice, soon encouraged by the public as well.

The conspirators had given little thought to the repercussions of their crime and were apprehended within days. Visconti and Olgiati were soon found and executed, as was the servant of Lampugnani who had participated in the slaying. The executions took place in a public ceremony that culminated in the display of their corpses as a warning to others.

Evidence from the conspirators' confessions indicated that the assassins had been encouraged by the humanist Cola Montano, who had left Milan some months before, and who bore malice against the duke for a public whipping some years before. While being tortured, Olgiati also uttered the famous words, "Mors acerba, fama perpetua, stabit vetus memoria facti" (Death is bitter, but glory is eternal, the memory of my deed will endure).

== Issue ==
Galeazzo and his wife, Bona of Savoy, had four children.

- Gian Galeazzo Maria Sforza (1469–1494), who became duke upon his father's death; he married his cousin Isabella of Aragon, Duchess of Milan and had issue.
- Ermes Maria Sforza (10 May 1470 – 1503), Marquis of Tortona.
- Bianca Maria Sforza (1472–1510), who married Philibert I, Duke of Savoy and Maximilian I, Holy Roman Emperor
- Anna Maria Sforza (1476–1497), who married Alfonso I d'Este.

With his mistress Lucrezia Landriani, he had four illegitimate children.

- Carlo Sforza (1458 – 9 May 1483), Count of Magenta and Lord of Casteggio. In 1478 he married Bianca Simonetta (1462 – 9 October 1467) and had two daughters, Angela (1479–1528, married Ercole d'Este, Lord of San Martino in Rio and had two children) and Ippolita (1482–1521, married Alessandro Bentivoglio and had seven children). His granddaughter, Violante Bentivoglio (1505–1550), married Giovanni Paolo I Sforza, who was the legitimized son of Ludovico il Moro, Duke of Milan, and Lucrezia Crivelli.
- Caterina Sforza (1462–1509), Countess of Fiorli and Lady of Imola, married three times: with Girolamo Riario; Giacomo Feo; and Giovanni de' Medici il Popolano. Reigned initially alongside her first husband and later as regent for their son, Ottaviano Riario.
- Alessandro Sforza (1465 – 29 September 1523), Lord of Francavilla. He married Barbara of conti Balbiani-Valchiavenna and had a daughter, Camilla and a son, Antonio.
- Chiara Sforza (1467 – 15 May 1531). She married first, Pietro II dal Verme, Count of Sangiatto and later Fregosino Fregoso, Count of Novi. By her second marriage, she had two sons, Ottaviano and Paolo.

By his mistress Lucia Marliani, he had two sons.

- Galeazzo Sforza (died on 28 September 1511). Captured in Soave by Federico Contarini, he died of the plague on the way to Padua.
- Ottaviano Maria Sforza (1475–1548) Bishop of Lodi.

== Sources ==
- Abulafia, David (1995). The French Descent into Renaissance Italy, 1494–1495: Antecedents and Effects. Routledge.
- Martines, Lauro (2003). April Blood: Florence and the Plot Against the Medici. New York: Oxford UP. ISBN 978-0-19-515295-1.
- Belotti Bortolo. Il Dramma di Gerolamo Olgiati; Milano; 1929
- Corio, Bernardino (1565). L'Historia di Milano (in Italian). presso Giorgio de' Caualli. p. 994.
- King, Ross (2012). Leonardo and the Last Supper. Bloomsbury.

Galeazzo Maria Sforza House of Sforza Born: 24 January 1444 Died: 26 December 1476
Preceded by Francesco I Sforza	Duke of Milan; 1466–1476	Succeeded by Gian Galeazzo Sforza
