= Basilica di Santo Stefano Maggiore =

Church in Milan, Italy

Coordinates: 45°27′44″N 9°11′40″E

Basilica di Santo Stefano Maggiore (Basilica di Santo Stefano Maggiore)
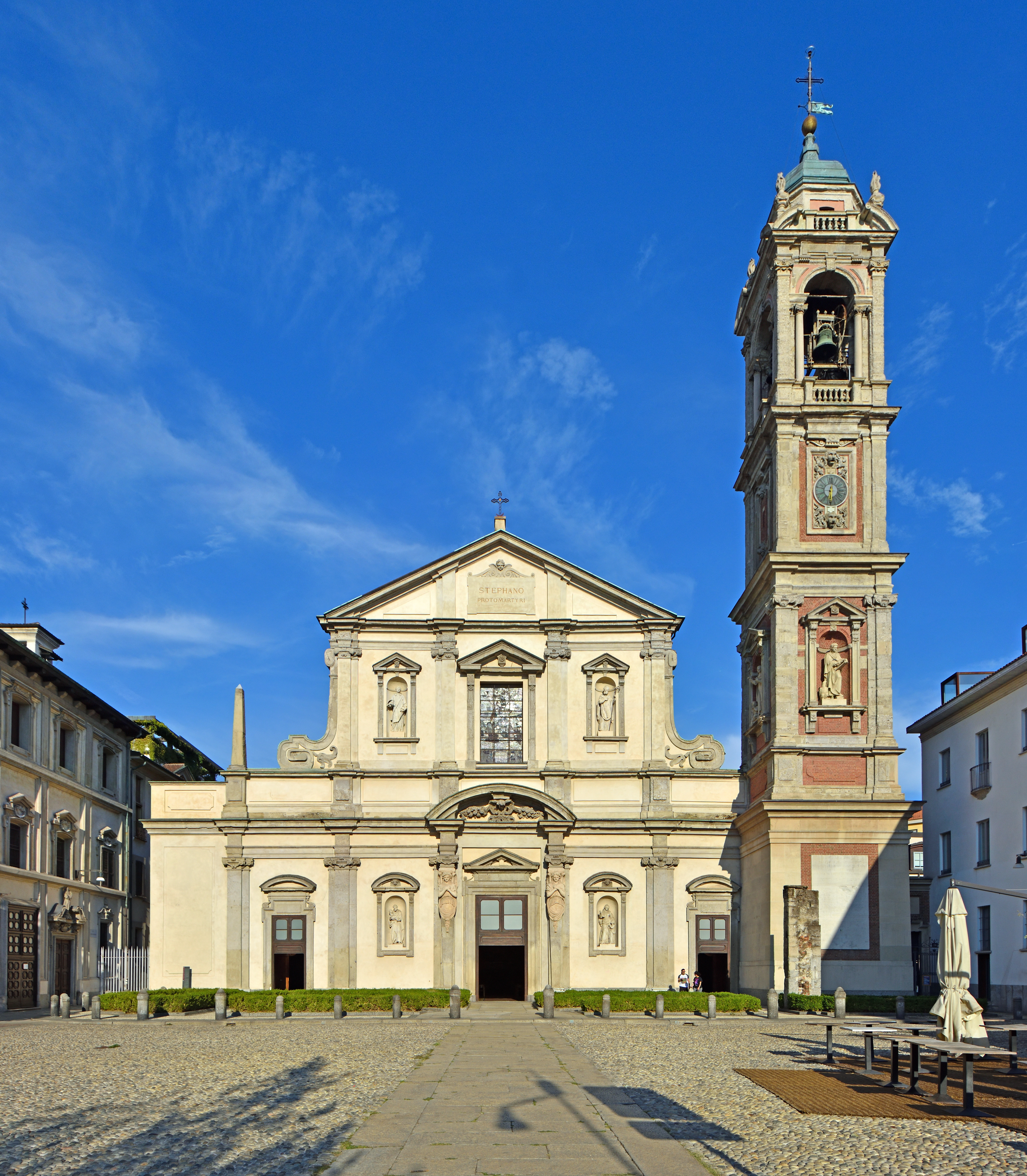
- Façade of the basilica

Religion
- Affiliation: Roman Catholic
- Province: Milan
- Status: Active

Location
- Location: Milan, Italy
- Interactive map of Basilica di Santo Stefano Maggiore (Basilica di Santo Stefano Maggiore)

Architecture
- Type: Church
- Style: Baroque
- Groundbreaking: 417
- Completed: 18c

Basilica di Santo Stefano Maggiore is a church in Milan, Italy. It was established in the 5th century. Originally dedicated to both Saint Zechariah and Saint Stephen, it was later dedicated to Saint Stephen only. Throughout its history, has undergone several reconstructions, expansion and restoration.

It is also called St. Stephen in Brolo (the historical name of the area) or St. Stephen's Gate (in reference to the postern of Santo Stefano, now no longer exists).

== History and description ==
The original church building was built around the year 417 on the initiative of the future bishop Martinianus. It was destroyed by fire in 1070 and it was rebuilt in romanesque style in 1075.

On 26 December 1476 it was the site of the assassination of Duke Galeazzo Maria Sforza, who had come to the basilica for the celebration of the patron saint.

On 30 September 1571 in Santo Stefano was baptized the painter Michelangelo Merisi, better known as Caravaggio. This fact was confirmed by the discovery in February 2007 of baptismal certificate of the painter.

Since 1594 the church underwent a series of interventions, including:

- enlargement of the apse and of the main altar (early 17th century)
- lengthening of the nave and reconstruction of the facade (mid 17th century)
- after the collapse in 1642, reconstruction of the bell tower by the architect Gerolamo Quadrio from Lugano (late 17th century)
- building of the sacristy (early 18th century )
- modernization of some chapels (early 19th century )

The church preserved the bodies of saints Martinianus, Ausanus and Mansuetus, archbishops of Milan, in 1988 translated to the Milan Cathedral. St. Charles Borromeo also translated here the bodies of saints Leo, Arsazius, Marinus, Mammes and Agapetus.

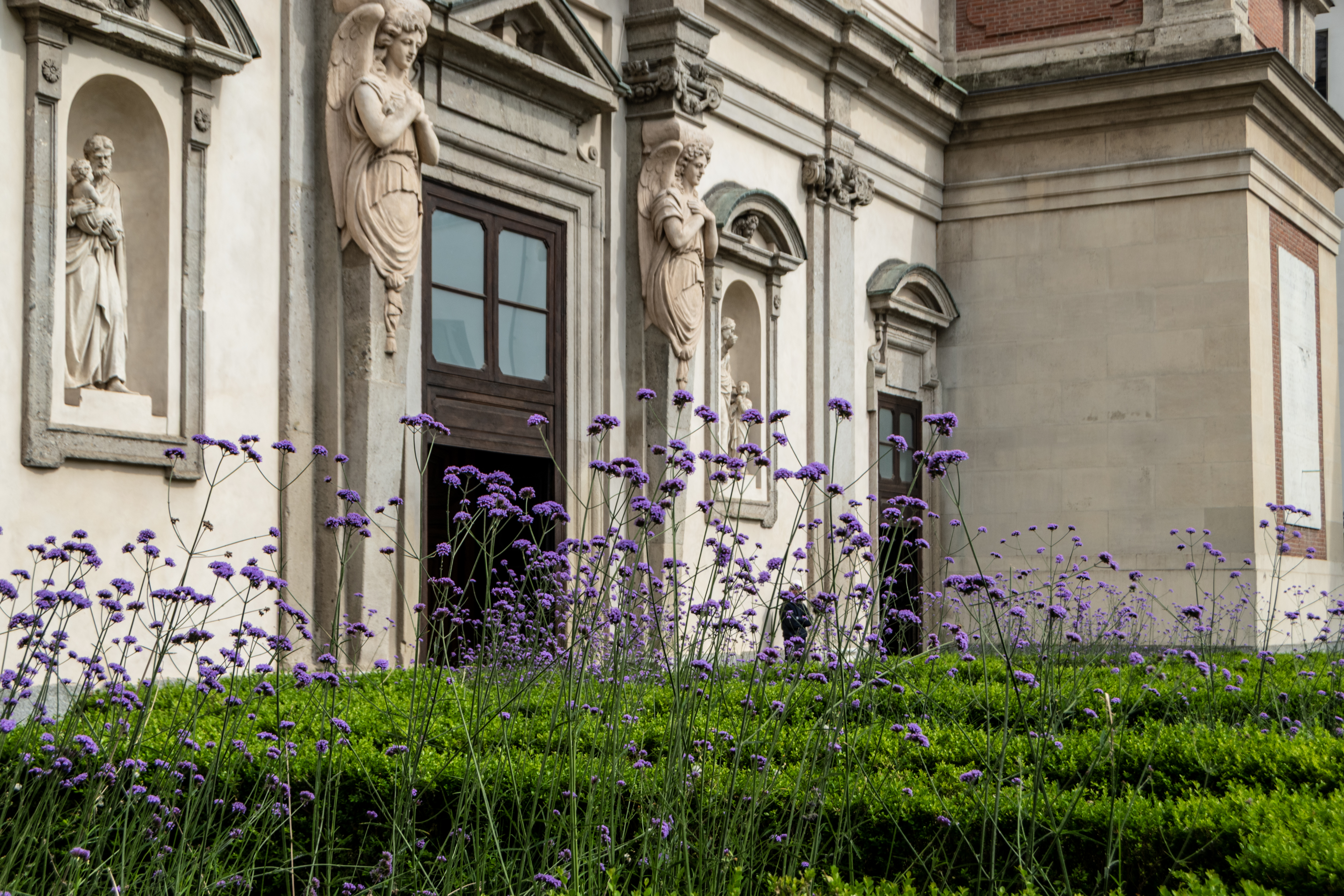
Main entrance of the basilica, with greenery, 2025
