= Bohdalice =

Coordinates: 49°12′50″N 17°01′47″E

- village
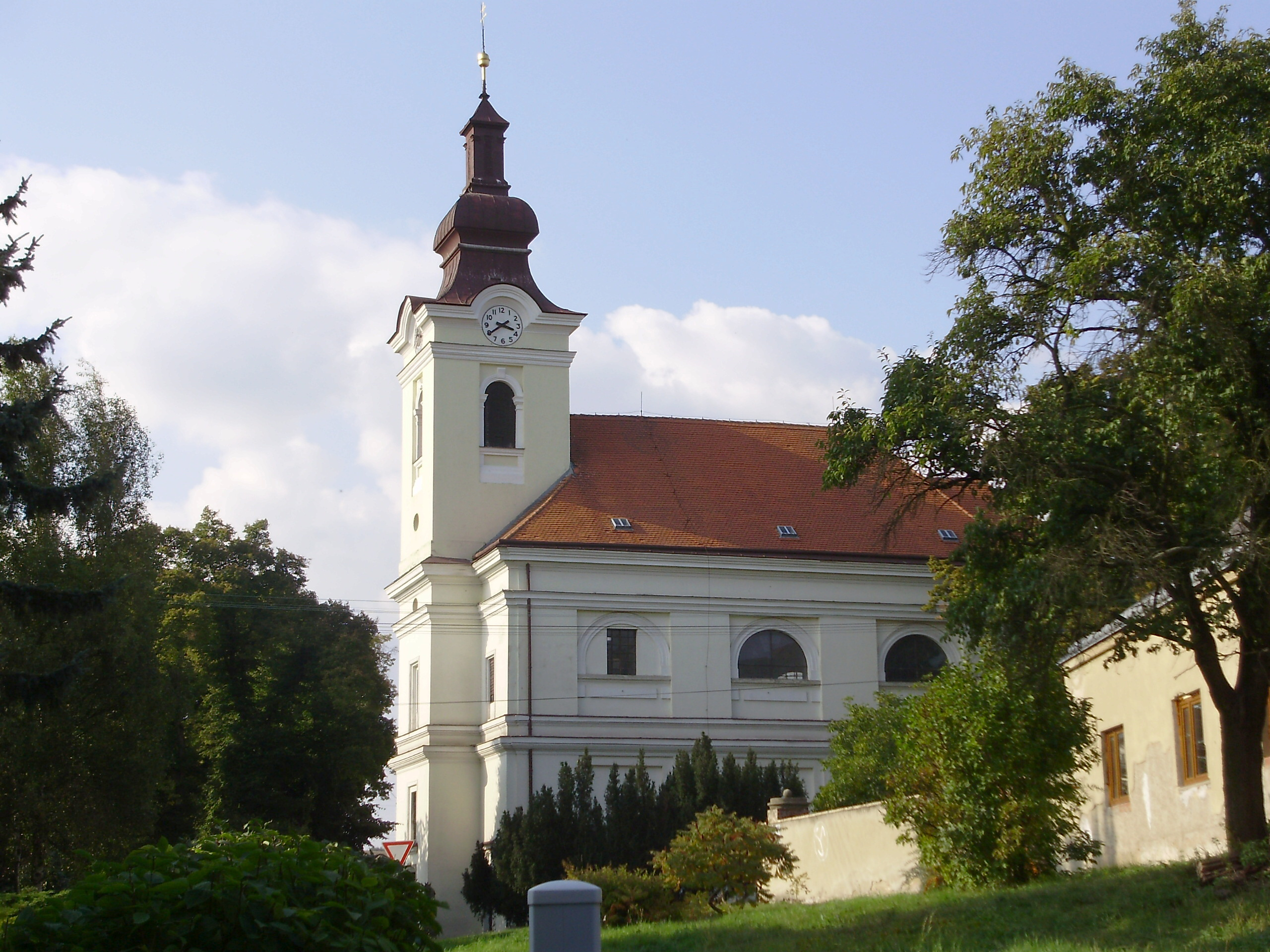
- Parish Church of the Assumption of the Virgin Mary (2008)
- Interactive map of Bohdalice
- Country: Czech Republic
- Region: South Moravian Region
- District: Vyškov District

Population
  - Total: 473

Bohdalice (in German: Bochdalicz) is a village which, together with Pavlovice, forms the municipality of Bohdalice-Pavlovice in the Vyškov District in the South Moravian Region, the Czech Republic. Until 1964 they were an independent municipality. Bohdalice has over 800 inhabitants. They are located 9 km south of the town of Vyškov by the road from Vyškov to Bučovice in hilly terrain with an average altitude of 296 m above sea level. The Bohdalský Stream flows through the village, opening into the Rostěnický Stream. Since 1785, the newly founded settlement of Manerov has been a part of Bohdalice.

Bohdalice was owned by the Olomouc Jesuits for a large part of its history (1638–1773). In the village stands the parish Church of the Assumption of the Virgin Mary, built-in 1807–1814 on the basis of probably a wooden church from the 15th century. Today's village has been part of the Větrník Microregion since 2000.

== History ==
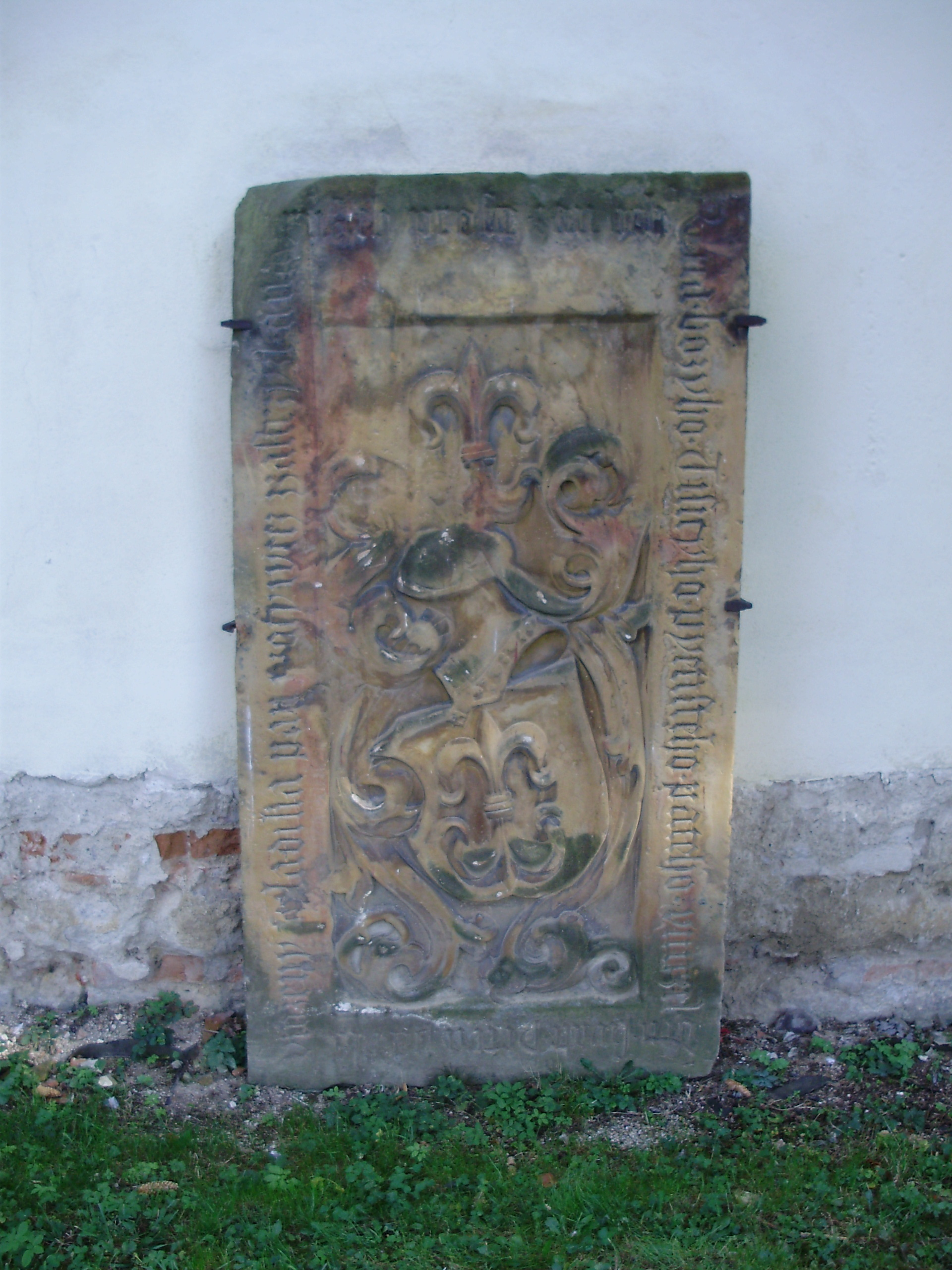
Tombstone of Protivec of Zástřizl standing by the church wall (2008)

The oldest signs of settlement come from the late Eneolithic, from the period of Bell Beaker culture. Other finds date back to the Migration Period that are probably Lombards. This is evidenced by the discovery of two graves from this period. A wrought-iron clasp was found in one of them.

=== The beginnings of the village ===
The first written mention of the village comes from June 24, 1337, when the name of Vojtěch of Bohdalice is mentioned in period documents. Over the centuries, the owners of the estate often changed. In 1368, four owners are known: Klára of Bohdalice (widow of the Čert of Bohdalice), who left her work to Petr Hecht of Rosice. The other owners were Svoch of Milotice and Přibík of Nítkovice. After the death of the latter, the property was forfeited to Ic, a Jew from Kroměříž. The next owners who bought the estate were Hřivín of Roštítek (brother of Klára of Bohdalice), the widow of Přibík Kateřina and Martin Nosek of Načešice. In 1401, the parish church was named for the first time in the surviving documents. In 1413, one of Bohdalice's courts was bought by Ondřej of Zástřizl and Pavlovice. Since 1420, Bohdalice has been firmly connected with Pavlovice, where the Zástřizl family had a fortress. The Zástřizl family held Bohdalice and Pavlovice from 1413 until 1531.

=== Modern age ===
In 1531, after the death of Filip of Zástřizl, the court was intabulated by Mikuláš Doupovec of Doupov. In 1539 the owners were brothers Jan and Petr Doupovec, who in 1551 gave Bohdalice and Pavlovice to Jeroným Bařický of Bařice. He died in 1564 and the farm was placed in the hands of Jan Sedlnický of Choltice. In 1566, Jan Gbelský of Gbelsko sat here and then Jan Nekeš sr. of Landek. Another owner was Jan Purkart Černčický of Kácov, who sold everything to Albrecht Čertorejský of Čertorej, who was the holder until his death in 1589. In 1601, Ladislav Berka of Dubá, Ladislav of Lobkovice took turns here, and in 1614 the new owner of the court became Lukáš Dembinský of Dembina. In 1638, Lukáš's widow Eliška Dembinská sold all her property to the Olomouc Jesuits for 20,000 Moravian guldens. The farm belonged to the Jesuits until the forcible abolition of the order in 1773.

=== The period of industrialization ===
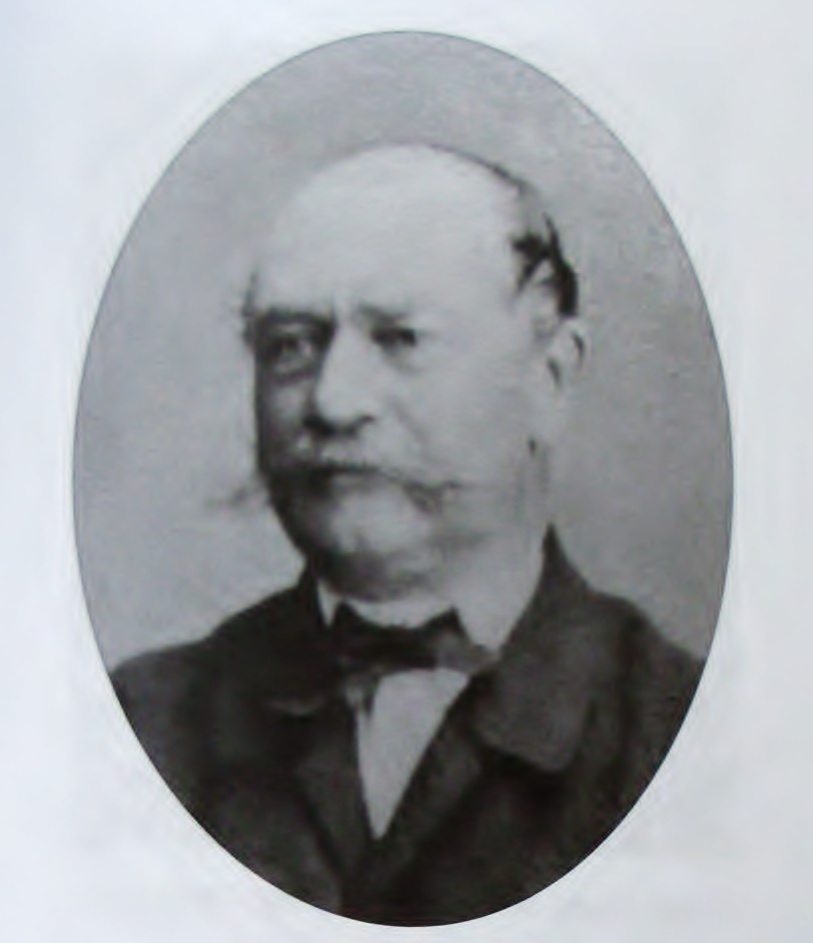
Michal Josef Manner (1810–1894)

In 1788, the state administration sold Bohdalice to Rajmund of Mannerov. The heirs sold the farm in 1804 to Jan Michal Manner, who died in Bohdalice on August 7, 1842. A significant event for the village was the visit of the Russian Emperor Alexander I., who spent the night in the local castle on November 29, 1805, and the visit of Emperor Francis II. in the administrator's apartment a few days before the Battle of Austerlitz. Then Bohdalice was owned by the patriot and Czech agitator Michal Josef Manner, who made Bohdalice the focus of national revival. Since 1882 there has been a post office in Bohdalice, since 1855 a health district has been established here, including eight surrounding municipalities, and since 1894 there has been a gendarmerie station. In the period around 1848, the center of the national movement around the knight Manner and the local chaplain Škorpík was created in Bohdalice. The main focus of this movement was agitation against the election to Frankfurt.

=== Present times ===
After the liberation by the Soviet army and the rise of the Communist Party to power, the nationalization of local companies began in Bohdalice as well. The first of these was Lang's plant in 1950, which became Kovoslužba and then Strojírny. This was followed by the collectivization of agriculture and the establishment of the Bohdalice collective farm. The merger of Bohdalice and Pavlovice took place in 1964. Today's village is part of the Větrník Microregion. There are 182 registered business entities focused mainly on trade, construction, industry and agriculture. Since 2006, 51 300 m^{2} of land has been returned to the cadastre of the municipality from the transfer of army property and the subsequent demise of the Bohdalice-Pavlovice barracks.

== Mayors ==
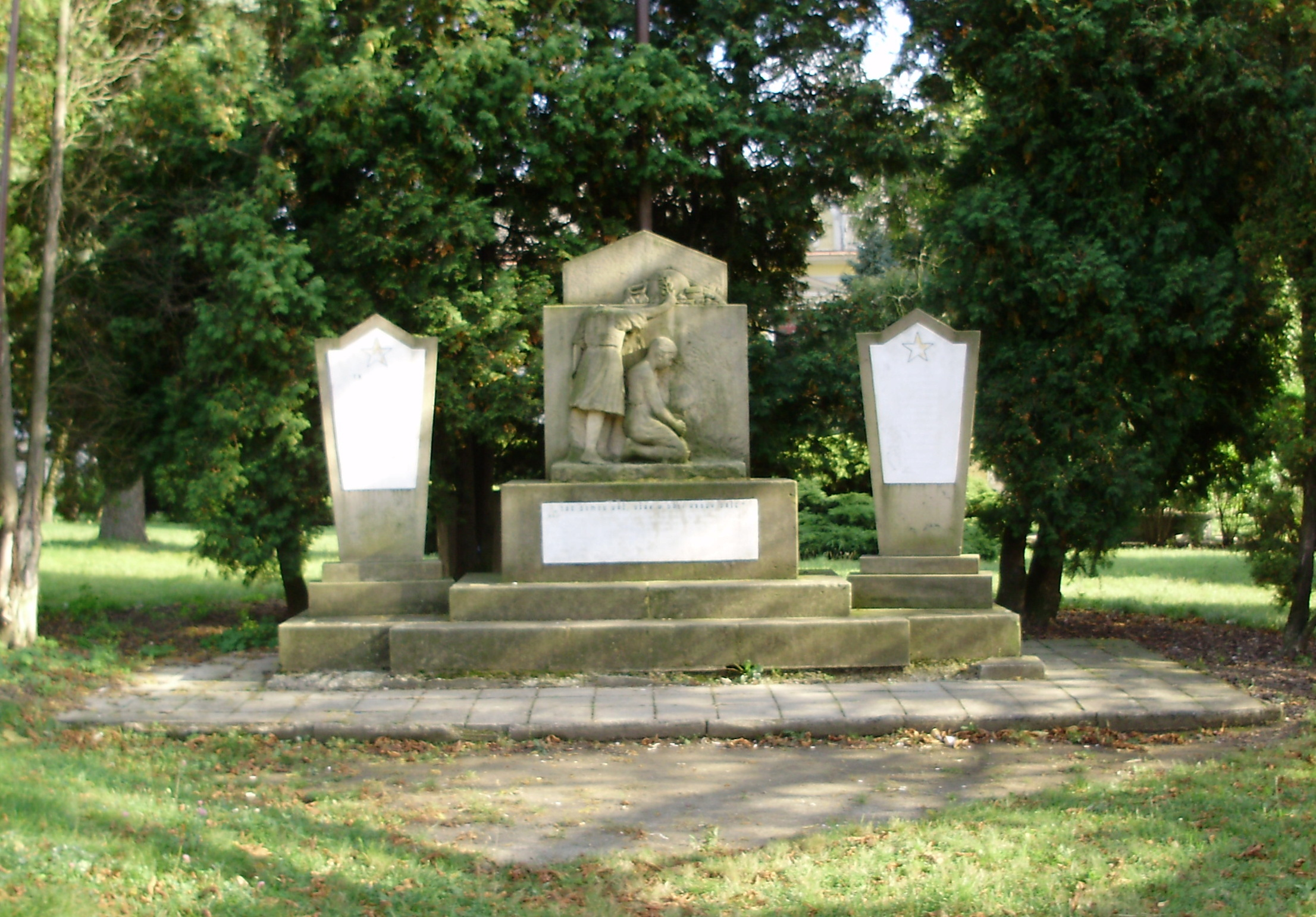
Monument to the fallen moved from the village square in front of the castle (2008)

Mayors in the village of Bohdalice have been elected since 1855. The mayors of the village of Bohdalice were: Pavel Janoušek (in 1855–1857), Josef Jandl (1858–1860), Josef Judas (1861–1863), Josef Kypr (1864–1869), František Novotný (1870–1875), Josef Kypr (1876–1878), Jan Dračka (1879–1884), Josef Jandl (1885–1887), Matouš Janoušek (1888–1890), František Stříž (1891–1896), František Novotný (1897–1905), Albín Doupovec (1906– 1918), Jan Michalík (1919–1927), Pavel Bár (1927–1935), Josef Kypr (1938–1945), Karel Lang (1945), Cyril Hynšt (1945, 1947), František Tobolka (1946), František Hudec (1948–1951), František Kubáček (1951–1957), Karel Halíř (1957–1960), Václav Krajtl (from 1960, after merging with Pavlovice until 1975).

== Demography ==
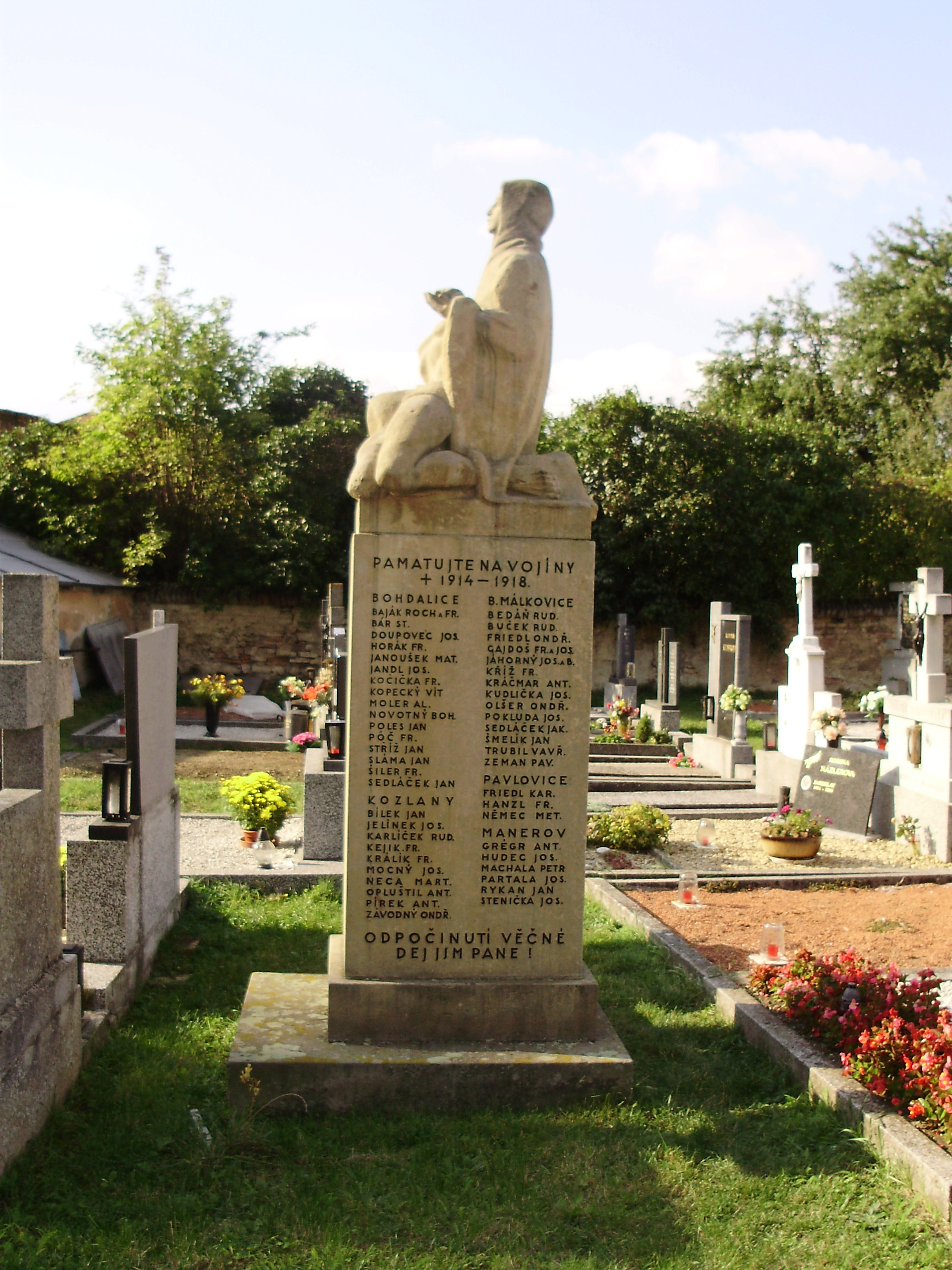
Monument to the Fallen in World War I in the local cemetery (2008)

=== Population composition ===
Bohdalice is an agricultural village which, together with Manerov, had a population of 600 Czechs in 1930. Thirty years later, in 1960, the population grew to 685 people, 336 men, and 349 women. According to the 2001 census of people, houses, and flats, there lived 810 inhabitants (the sum is also given with Manerov and Pavlovice), of which 394 men, and 416 women. The ethnic composition of the city's population is relatively homogeneous, 477 inhabitants report Czech, 300 Moravian, 17 Slovak, and 6 Vietnamese nationalities respectively.

The development of the number of inhabitants for the whole municipality.

Local parts		1869	1880	1890	1900	1910	1921	1930	1950	1961	1970	1980	1991	2001	2011
Number of inhabitants	Bohdalice	337	361	454	461	444	432	415	372	433	382	424	464	468	473
Number of houses	Bohdalice	48	50	55	57	59	62	68	88	150	97	102	92	112	119

=== Religious life ===
The village of Bohdalice is the seat of the Roman Catholic parish of Bohdalice belonging to the Austerlitz deanery. The parish church is the local Church of the Assumption of the Virgin Mary. In the immediate vicinity of the church is the parish building from 1848, the construction of which was financed by Michal Josef Manner. According to the census from 2001, 360 inhabitants profess the faith, of which 350 belong to the Roman Catholic Church, 1 to the Evangelical Church of Czech Brethren, and two to the Czechoslovak Hussite Church.

== Education and culture ==
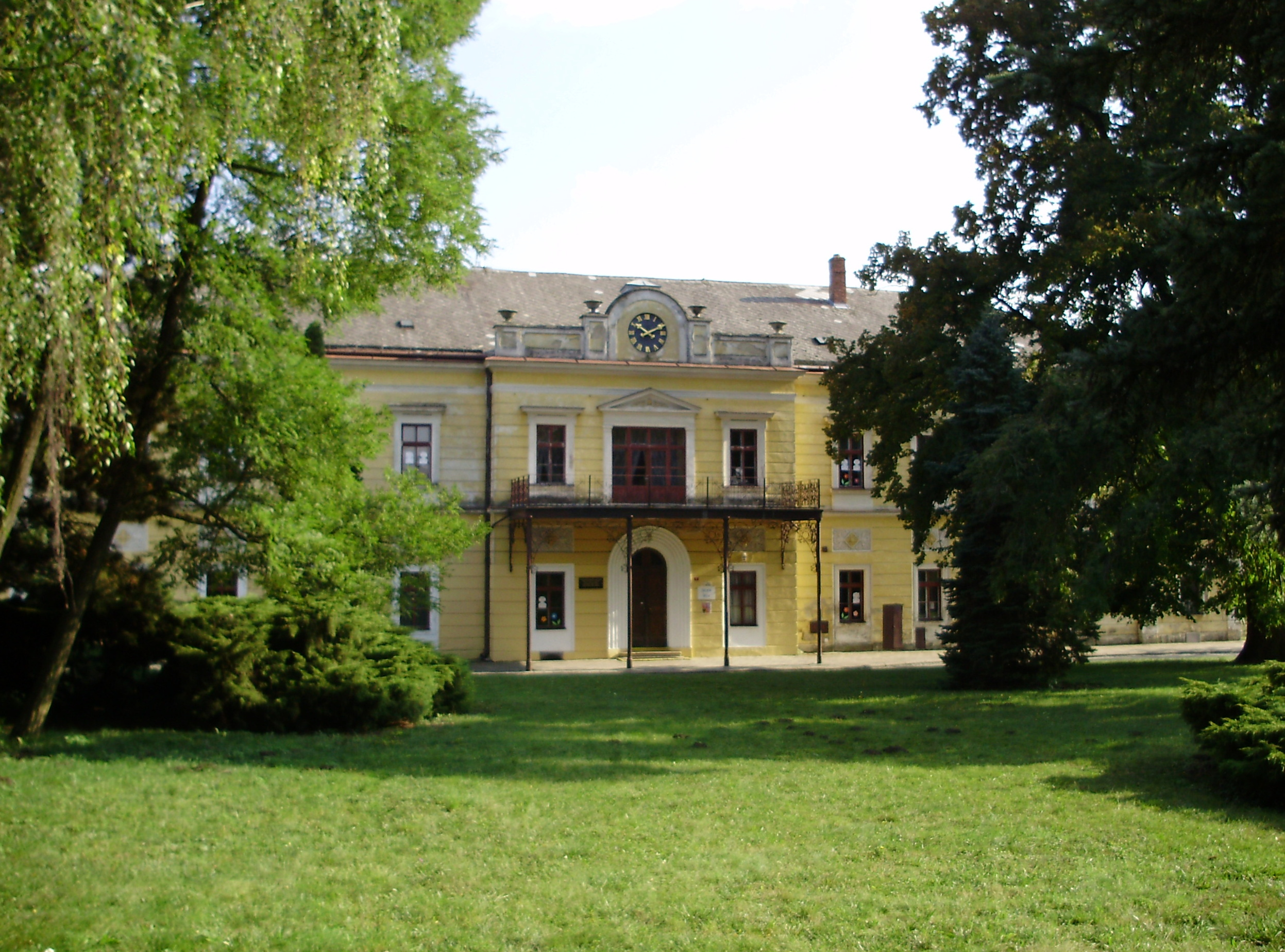
The building of Bohdalický chateau and today's Elementary school (2008)

The school in the village probably existed in the second half of the 18th century, but it was not explicitly named until 1785 when the first known teacher died. This first school was one-class, since 1874 it has been extended to two-class and in 1887 to three-class. The burgher school in Bohdalice was opened in the building of the former chateau in 1945. In that year the chateau still belonged to the Manner and Skutezky families. In 1958, the burgher school was transformed into an eight-year secondary school for six surrounding villages.

Today, there is a primary school in Bohdalice – a contributory organization, which was established as an independent legal entity by the municipal office in Bohdalice. This school brings together an elementary school, a kindergarten, a school club, and a school canteen. The primary school is considered a family-type school located in the building of the reconstructed chateau. Pupils from Kozlany, Bohaté Málkovice, Kučerov, Hlubočany, and Hvězdlice also attend the school.

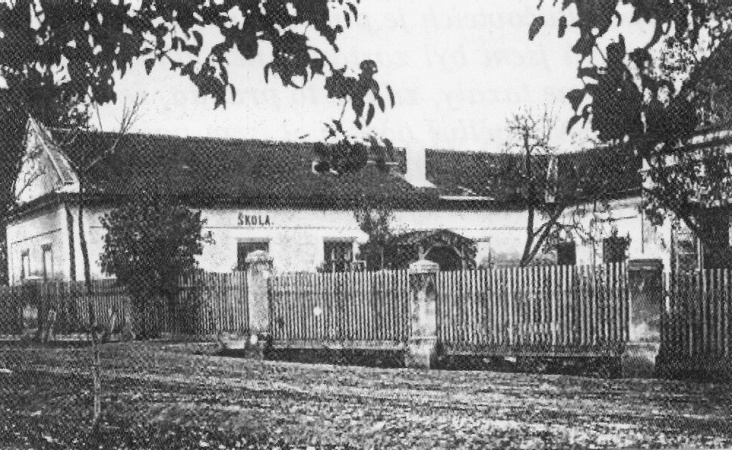
Former primary school

The village of Bohdalice is also associated with the birth of many famous personalities. The most famous include the Moravian patriot and priest František Xaver Škorpík, the businessman and founder of the local dairy Karel Lang and Msgr. Dr. Františk Antonín Ludvík Stříž, Honorary Papal Chamber and Residence Canon in Vyšehrad. Furthermore, the history of the village was greatly influenced by the Manner family.

Before World War II, there were several associations in Bohdalice; from 1906 there was a department of the National Unity with 110 members, from 1924 the People's Unity, to which 65 citizens applied, and in 1927 a branch of the Trade Licensing and Trade Party was established here. Two political associations operated here: the Agrarian and Workers' Organizations. The fire brigade was founded by the inaugural general meeting on December 5, 1929. Today, the activities of Sokol and the associated football club Sokol Kozlany–Bohdalice, since 1945 the hunting association and the Czech Breeders' Association are evident in the village.

== Transport, industry and agriculture ==
At the end of the 18th century, there was a distillery, a brewery, and two windmills near the Bohdalice estate. Mostly sheep were bred here and species of clover and fruit were grown. In 1907, Lang's tinsmith plant was founded in the village, which was transformed into Kovoslužba in 1950 and later into the plant of Strojírny drůbežářského průmyslu. A steam dairy for the production of butter and cheese used to stand at this plant. This dairy was shut down in 1936 and relocated outside the village due to a lack of water.

Today, the dominant company in the village is the successor of Lang's plant, the joint-stock company Strojírny Bohdalice. The company focuses on the production of hanging balconies for the revitalization of prefabricated houses, the production of solar collectors, equipment for the food industry, and solar panels. There are also small-scale production facilities, such as a company dealing with interiors or a company for the production of plastic fittings.

In 1950, a unified agricultural cooperative was established in the village with an area on the northern edge of the village. At its establishment, the collective farm had 88 members. In 1958, the Manerov collective farm joined Bohdalice and it already managed 296 hectares of fields. Subsequently, the JZD (Note: JZD stands for Jednotné Zemědělské Družstvo (Unified Agricultural Cooperative in English), a generic name for collective farms in communist Czechoslovakia.) Pavlovice joined the collective farm in 1962 with an area of cultivated fields higher than 300 ha. Another merger took place in 1977, when the JZD Kojátky joined the JZD New Direction Bohdalice, creating the JZD Sokolovo with its registered office in Bohdalice.

Transport services are provided by the second class road II/431 (Vyškov – Bohdalice – Bučovice – Ždánice). The second class road II/429 (Bohdalice – Nesovice – Koryčany – Osvětimany) passes along the eastern border of the cadastral area, the third class road III/4314 (Bohdalice – Rostěnice – Luleč) passes through the western part of the area. There is a bus stop in the village in the center of the village square. Bus transport is provided by regular bus Vyškov – Bohdalice-Pavlovice – Hvězdlice – Nemochovice – Brankovice.

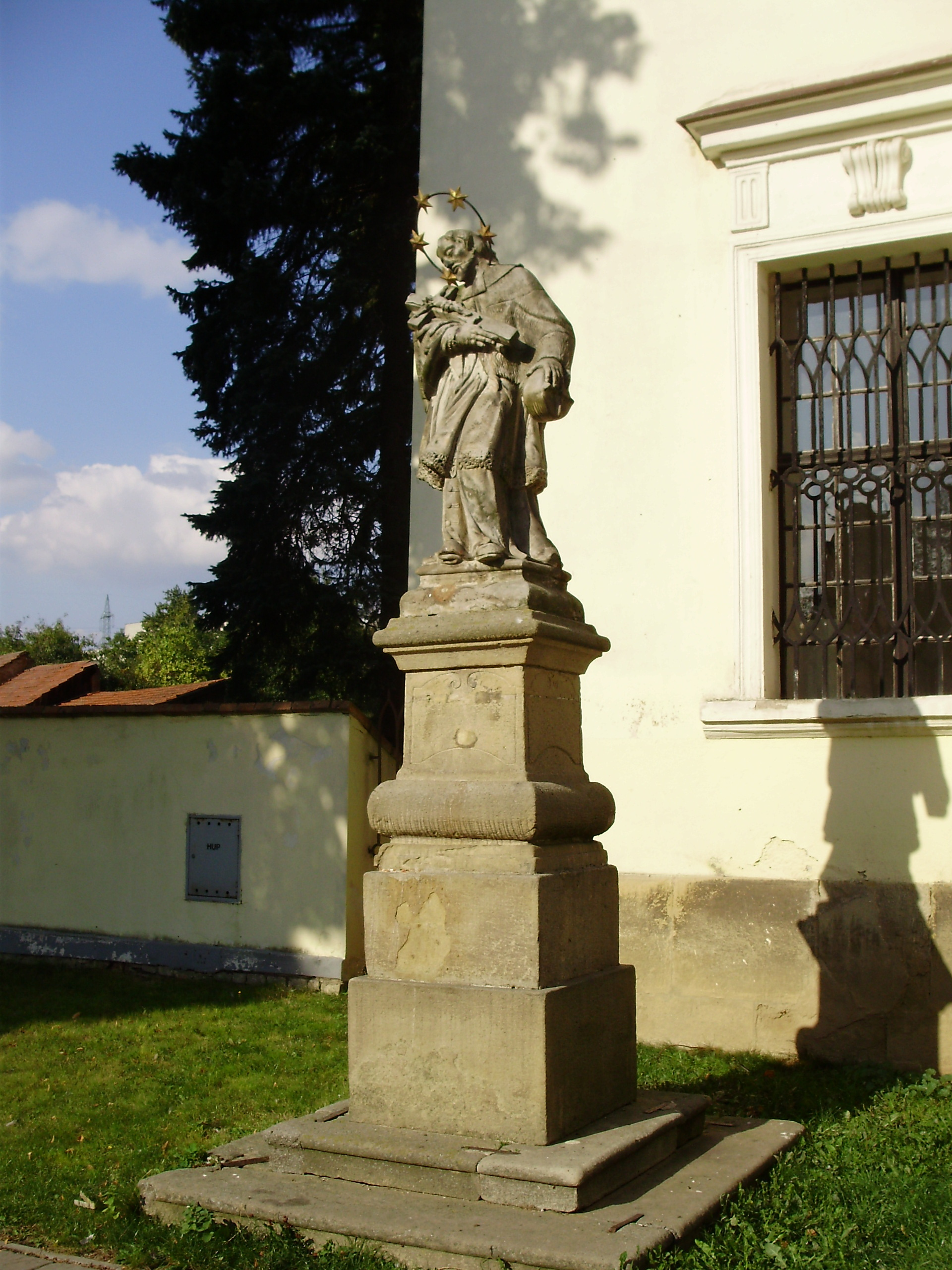
Baroque statue of the Saint John of Nepomuk (2008)

== Monuments and tourist attractions ==
- Church of the Assumption of the Virgin Mary in the Empire style built in 1807–1814
- Bohdalice Castle in the Neoclassical style, built in the first quarter of the 19th century, standing on the original site of a Renaissance fortress
- The tombstone of Protivec of Zástřizl from 1505 leans against the outer wall of the western side of the Church of the Assumption of the Virgin Mary, which was probably transported to Bohdalice from Pavlovice.
- Granite stone with a metal relief of the founder of Sokol Miroslav Tyrš from 1932
- Stone cross at the church from 1845
- Baroque statue of Saint John of Nepomuk from the first half of the 18th century
- Baroque martyrdom from the end of the 18th century standing on the way to Kučerov
- Conciliation cross standing on the way to Kučerov

== Sources ==
- "Vyškovsko". www.wikidata.org.
- Maňhalová, Dagmar (2003). Z dějin Bohdalic - 666. let od první písemné zmínky o obci (in Czech). OÚ Bohdalice.
- Valůšek, David (2004-01-01). "Šlechtické náhrobníky v Bohdalicích". Vyškovský sborník IV (in Czech).
- Noga, Karel (2001-01-01). "Z minulosti tvrze a zámku v Bohdalicích". Vyškovský sborník II (in Czech).
- Q96634056. Muzeum Vyškovska. January 2000. ISBN 9788023872057.
