= Kozlany =

Kozlany may refer to places in the Czech Republic:

- Kozlany (Třebíč District), a municipality and village in the Vysočina Region
- Kozlany (Vyškov District), a municipality and village in the South Moravian Region
- Kožlany, a town in the Plzeň Region
