= 1531 =

1531 in various calendars
- Gregorian calendar: 1531; MDXXXI
- Ab urbe condita: 2284
- Armenian calendar: 980; ԹՎ ՋՁ
- Assyrian calendar: 6281
- Balinese saka calendar: 1452–1453
- Bengali calendar: 937–938
- Berber calendar: 2481
- English Regnal year: 22 Hen. 8 – 23 Hen. 8
- Buddhist calendar: 2075
- Burmese calendar: 893
- Byzantine calendar: 7039–7040
- Chinese calendar: 庚寅年 (Metal Tiger); 4228 or 4021 — to — 辛卯年 (Metal Rabbit); 4229 or 4022
- Coptic calendar: 1247–1248
- Discordian calendar: 2697
- Ethiopian calendar: 1523–1524
- Hebrew calendar: 5291–5292
- Hindu calendars
- Vikram Samvat: 1587–1588
- Shaka Samvat: 1452–1453
- Kali Yuga: 4631–4632
- Holocene calendar: 11531
- Igbo calendar: 531–532
- Iranian calendar: 909–910
- Islamic calendar: 937–938
- Japanese calendar: Kyōroku 4 (享禄４年)
- Javanese calendar: 1449–1450
- Julian calendar: 1531; MDXXXI
- Korean calendar: 3864
- Minguo calendar: 381 before ROC 民前381年
- Nanakshahi calendar: 63
- Thai solar calendar: 2073–2074
- Tibetan calendar: ལྕགས་ཕོ་སྟག་ལོ་ (male Iron-Tiger); 1657 or 1276 or 504 — to — ལྕགས་མོ་ཡོས་ལོ་ (female Iron-Hare); 1658 or 1277 or 505

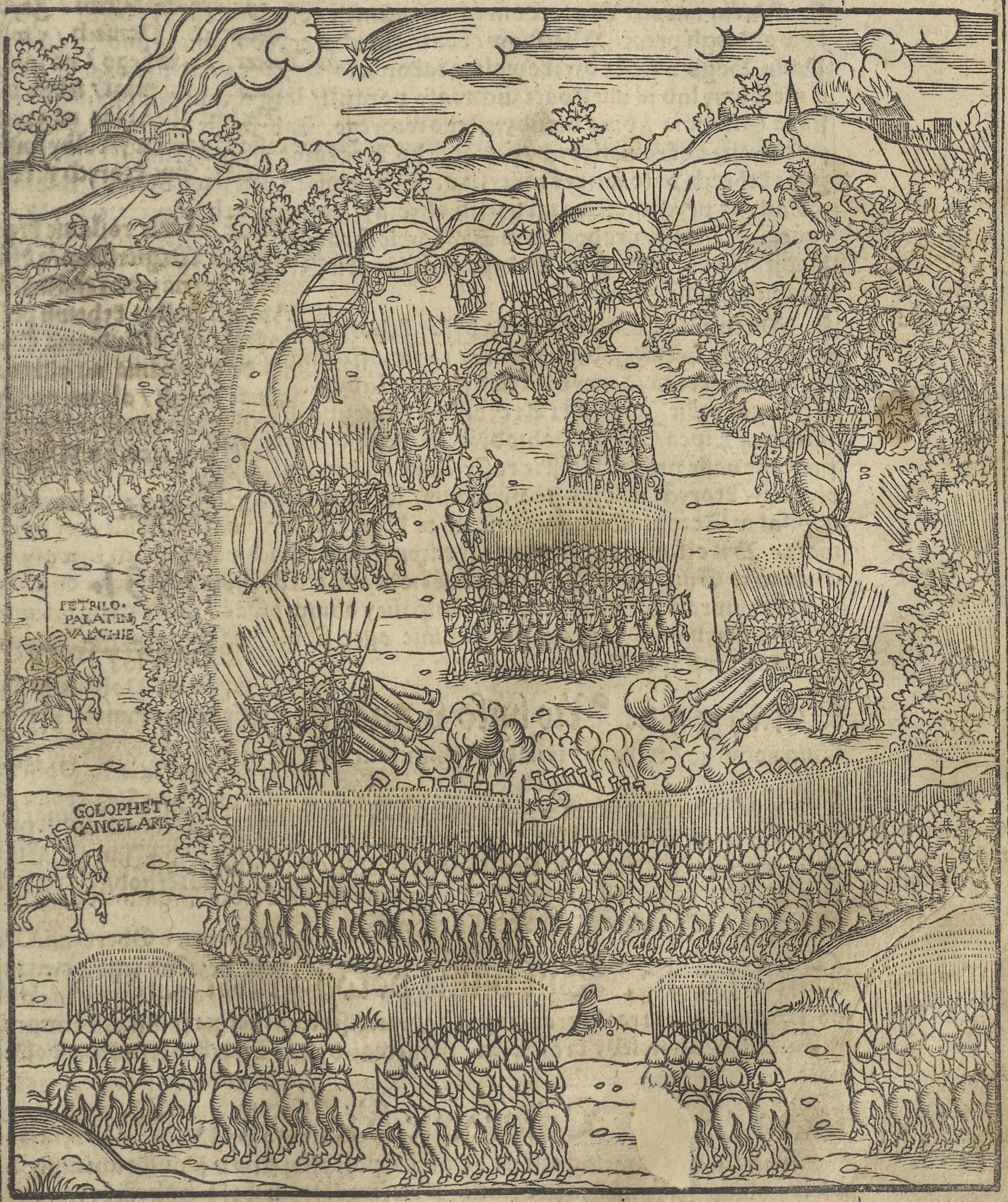
August 22: The Battle of Obertyn is fought between Poland and Moldova

Year 1531 (MDXXXI) was a common year starting on Sunday of the Julian calendar.

== Events ==
October 11: Second War of Kappel

=== January–March ===
- January 15 – The third session of the Reformation Parliament of King Henry VIII of England is opened.
- January 26 – 1531 Lisbon earthquake: More than 30,000 people are killed in Portugal in an earthquake and subsequent tsunami.
- February 27 – Lutheran princes in the Holy Roman Empire form an alliance known as the Schmalkaldic League.
- February or March – Battle of Antukyah: Ahmad ibn Ibrahim al-Ghazi of the Adal Sultanate defeats the Ethiopian army.
- March 28 – In India, the fortress of Mandu, capital of the Malwa Sultanate, falls as Malwa's Sultan Mahmúd II and his sons surrender to Bahadur Shah of Gujarat.
- March 31 – King Henry VIII gives royal assent to numerous acts at the close of the session of the English Parliament, including the Poisoning Act 1530 (providing for boiling to death people convicted of poisioning other persons); the Vagabonds Act 1530 (permitting licensed begging by certified disabled and elderly people); the Egyptians Act 1530 to allow the expulsion of gypsies; and the Bridges Act 1530 for maintenance of bridges.

=== April–June ===
- April 12 – In the Songhai Empire that rules most of West Africa and the Niger River valley, the Emperor Askiya Musa is assassinated by his brothers after less than two years on the throne. Askia Mohammad Benkan is enthroned the same day.
- April 16 – The city of Puebla, Mexico, is founded.
- April – Battle of Puná: Francisco Pizarro defeats the native inhabitants of the island of Puná, off of the coast of what is now the South American nation of Ecuador.
- May 18 – The third Dalecarlian rebellion in Sweden is settled on St. Eric's Day at Arboga in Denmark when King Christian II returns church bells, confiscated earlier to pay Denmark's debts, to the villages in rebellion.
- May 27 – (11th waxing of Nayon 893 ME) Minkhaung of Mrauk-U, the Burmese King of Arakan since 1521, is killed in a coup d'etat by the rebellious Governor of Thandwe, Min Pa.
- June 24 – The city of San Juan del Río, Mexico, is founded.

=== July–September ===
- July 25 – The city of Santiago de Querétaro, Mexico is founded.
- August 22 – Battle of Obertyn: The Moldavians are defeated by Polish forces under Jan Tarnowski, allowing the Poles to recapture Pokucie.
- August 26 – Comet Halley achieves its perihelion.
- September 15 – The first Parliament of Ireland in more than nine years is opened at Kilkea Castle, near Castledermot, County Kildare, and continues until its adjournment on October 31.
- September 16 – (5th waxing of Thadingyut 893 ME) In Burma (now Myanmar), the formal coronation of General Min Pa as King Min Bin of Arakan takes place in the Arakan capital, Mrauk U.
- September 24 – At the age of 35, King Gustav I Vasa of Sweden is married for the first time, taking Catherine of Saxe-Lauenburg as his bride on her 18th birthday.

=== October–December ===
- October 11 – Battle of Kappel: The forces of Zürich are defeated by the Catholic cantons. Huldrych Zwingli, the Swiss religious reformer, is killed.
- October 28 – Battle of Amba Sel: Imam Ahmad ibn Ibrahim al-Ghazi again defeats the army of Dawit II, Emperor of Ethiopia. The southern part of Ethiopia thus falls under Imam Ahmad's control.
- November 5 – Christian II`s invasion force arrives in Oslo.
- December 9 – The Virgin of Guadalupe first appears to Juan Diego at Tepeyac, Mexico City.
- December 12 – Mary, mother of Jesus, in the guise of Our Lady of Guadalupe, appears imprinted on the tilmàtli of Juan Diego Cuauhtlatoatzin, an Aztec convert to Catholicism, in Tepeyac near Mexico City.

=== Date unknown ===
- Andrea Alciato publishes Emblemata.
- Conquistador Francisco de Montejo claims Chichen Itza as capital of Spanish-ruled Yucatán.
- The University of Sarajevo is founded by Gazi Husrev-beg based on Sufi philosophy.
- Kõpu Lighthouse is completed.
- A severe drought in Henan province, China, coupled with a gigantic swarm of locusts in the summer, forces many in destitute agricultural communities to turn to cannibalism to avoid dying by starvation.
- Charles V, Holy Roman Emperor abolishes the worst abuses of the encomienda system, by pressure of Bartolomé de las Casas.
- A witch-hunt is conducted in the town of Schiltach, Germany.
- In present-day Czech Republic, the Zástřizl family held Bohdalice and Pavlovice from 1413 until 1531.

== Births ==
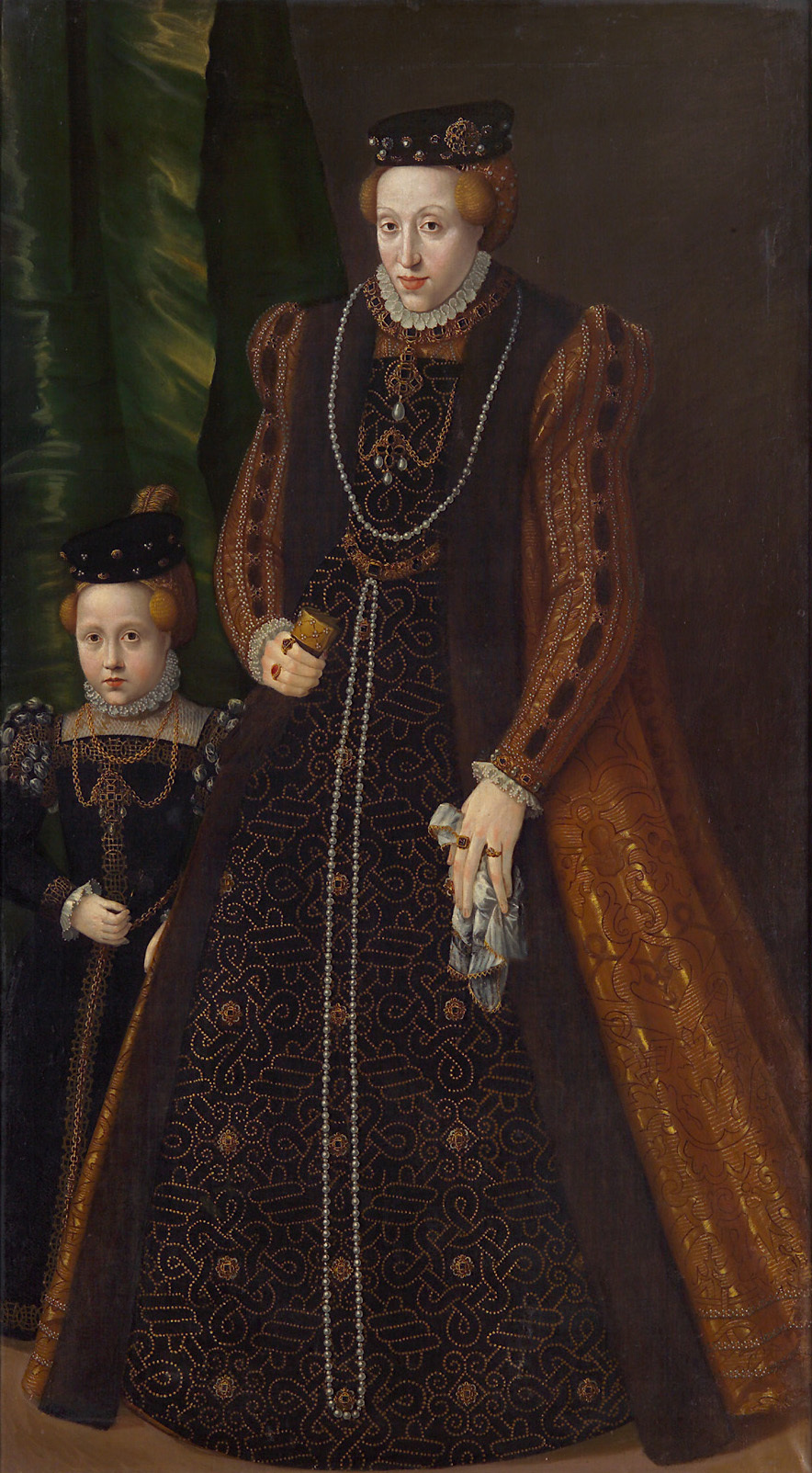
Maria of Austria, Duchess of Jülich-Cleves-Berg

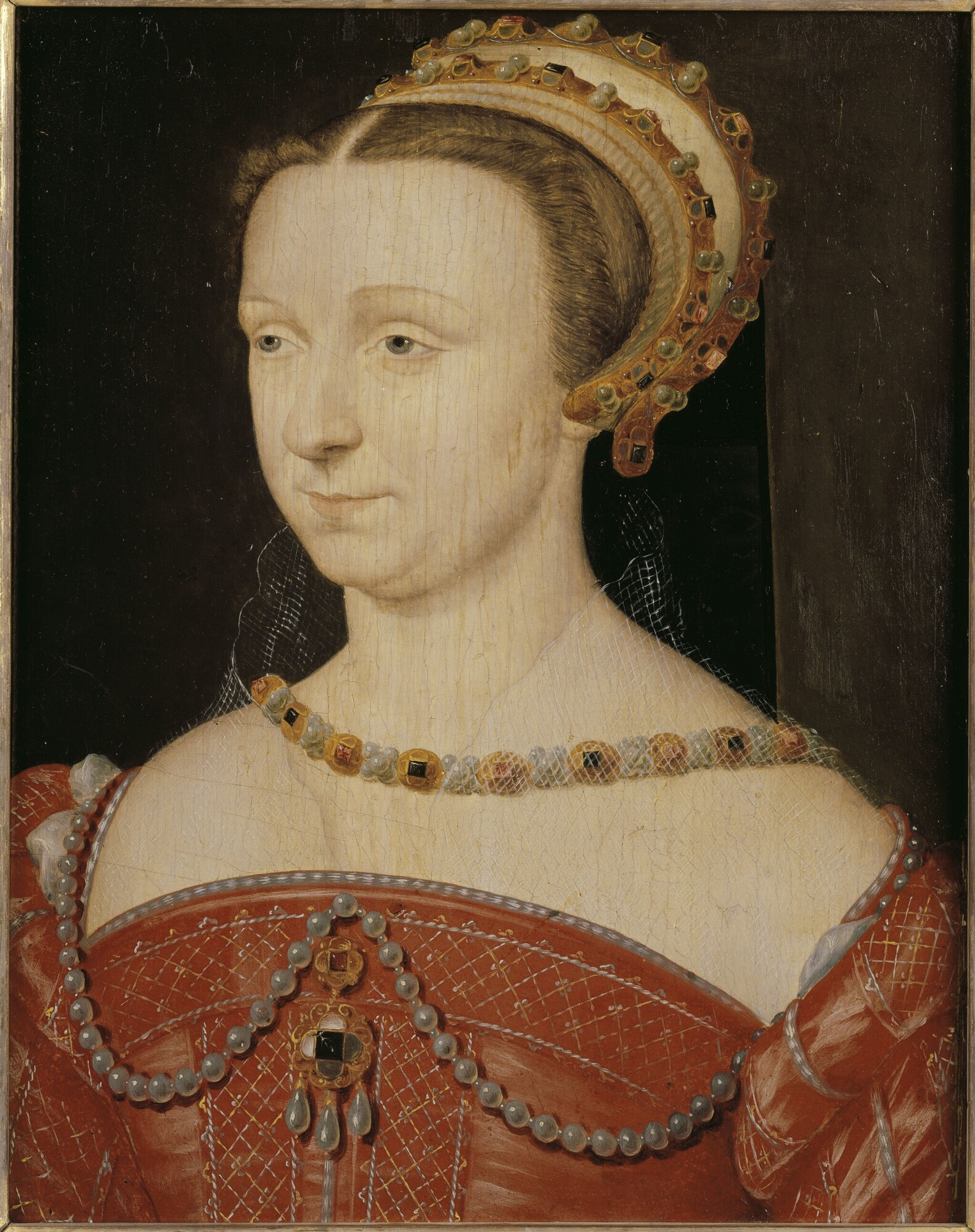
Anna d'Este

- January 26 – Jens Bille, Danish servant and poet (d. 1575)
- April 6 – Wolfgang, Duke of Brunswick-Grubenhagen (d. 1595)
- May 15 – Maria of Austria, Duchess of Jülich-Cleves-Berg, daughter of Emperor Ferdinand I (d. 1581)
- May 20 – Viceroy Thado Minsaw of Ava (d. 1584)
- June 1 – János Zsámboky, Hungarian scholar (d. 1584)
- July 17 – Antoine de Créqui Canaples, French Catholic cardinal (d. 1574)
- July 22 – Leonhard Thurneysser, German scholar and quack at the court of John George, Elector of Brandenburg (d. 1595)
- September 2 – Francesco Cattani da Diacceto, Bishop of Fiesole (d. 1595)
- September 4 – Hans Fugger, German businessman (d. 1598)
- September 14 – Philipp Apian, German mathematician and medic (d. 1589)
- Late September – Henry Stanley, 4th Earl of Derby, English noble and diplomat (d. 1594)
- October 7 – Scipione Ammirato, Italian historian (d. 1601)
- October 12 – Jacques de Savoie, 2nd Duc de Nemours (d. 1585)
- October 25 – Matthew Wesenbeck, Belgian jurist (d. 1586)
- October 27 – Herbert Duifhuis, Dutch minister (d. 1581)
- November 14 – Richard Topcliffe, English torturer (d. 1604)
- November 16 – Anna d'Este, duchess consort of Nemours (d. 1607)
- November 18 – Roberto di Ridolfi, Italian conspirator against Elizabeth I of England (d. 1612)
- November 29 – Johannes Letzner, German Protestant priest and historian (d. 1613)
- December – Hendrick van Brederode, Dutch noble (d. 1568)
- December 6 – Vespasiano I Gonzaga, Italian noble and diplomat (d. 1591)
- December 10 – Henry IX, Count of Waldeck (d. 1577)
- date unknown
  - Akiyama Nobutomo, Japanese nobleman (d. 1575)
  - António, Prior of Crato, claimant to the throne of Portugal (d. 1595)
  - John Popham, Lord Chief Justice of England (d. 1607)
  - Şehzade Cihangir, Ottoman prince (d. 1553)

== Deaths ==
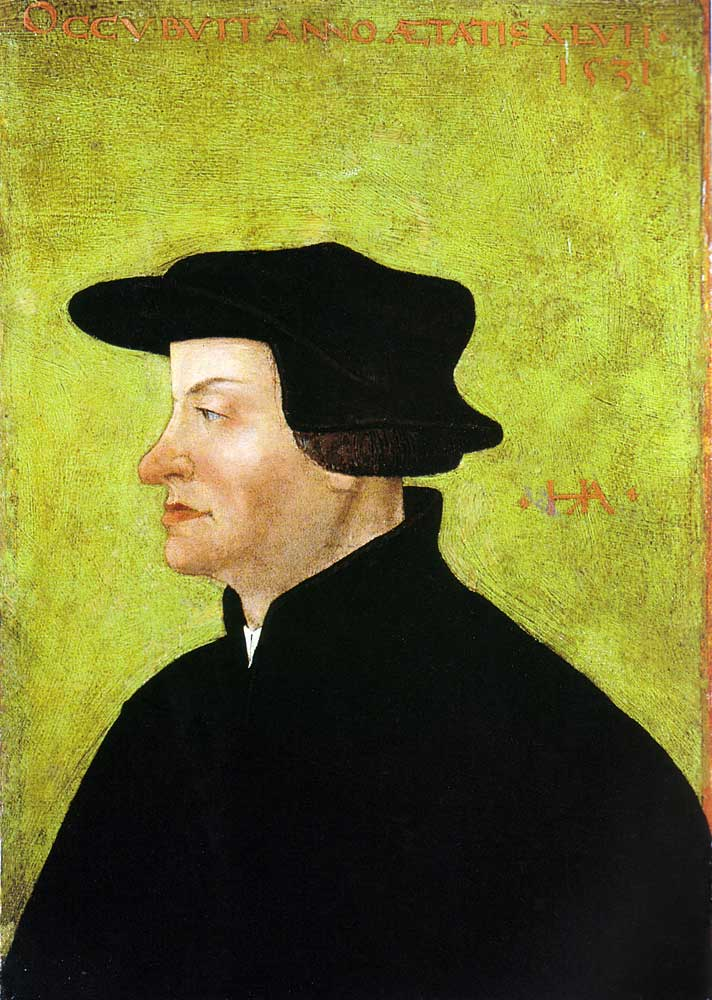
Huldrych Zwingli

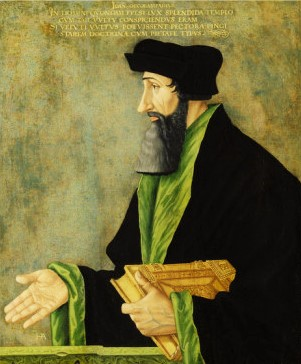
Johannes Oecolampadius

- January 14 – Walraven II van Brederode, Dutch noble (b. 1462)
- January 31 – Edward Sutton, 2nd Baron Dudley (b. 1460)
- February 16 – Johannes Stöffler, German mathematician (b. 1452)
- March – María Pacheco, Spanish heroine and defender of Toledo (b. 1496)
- March 6 – Pedrarias Dávila, Spanish colonial administrator (b. c. 1440)
- May 19 – Jan Łaski, Polish statesman and diplomat (b. 1456)
- May 20 – Guy XVI, Count of Laval (b. 1476)
- May 10 – George I, Duke of Pomerania from the House of Griffins (b. 1493)
- July 7 – Tilman Riemenschneider, German sculptor (b. 1460)
- July 17 – Hosokawa Takakuni, Japanese military commander (b. 1484)
- July 23 – Louis de Brézé, seigneur d'Anet, Marshal of Normandy and husband of Diane de Poitiers
- August 30 – Diego Hurtado de Mendoza, 3rd Duke of the Infantado, Spanish noble (b. 1461)
- September 18 – Lorenzo Pucci, Italian Catholic cardinal (b. 1458)
- September 22 – Louise of Savoy, French regent (b. 1476)
- October 11 – Huldrych Zwingli, Swiss reformer (in battle) (b. 1484)
- November 24 – Johannes Oecolampadius, German religious reformer (b. 1482)
- November 28 – Hedwig of Münsterberg-Oels, German noble (b. 1508)
- December 1 – Maud Green, English noble (b. 1492)
- date unknown
  - Henrique of Kongo, bishop (b. 1495)
  - Eva von Isenburg, sovereign Princess Abbess of Thorn Abbey
  - Bars Bolud Jinong, Mongol khan (b. 1490)
  - Vallabha Acharya, Indian founder of the Hindu Vallabha sect (b. 1479)
  - Gerónimo de Aguilar, Spanish Franciscan friar who participated in the Spanish conquest of Mexico (b. 1489)
- probable
  - Fernán Pérez de Oliva, Spanish man of letters (b. 1492)
  - Antonio Pigafetta, Italian navigator (b. 1491)
