= Bohdalice-Pavlovice =

- Municipality
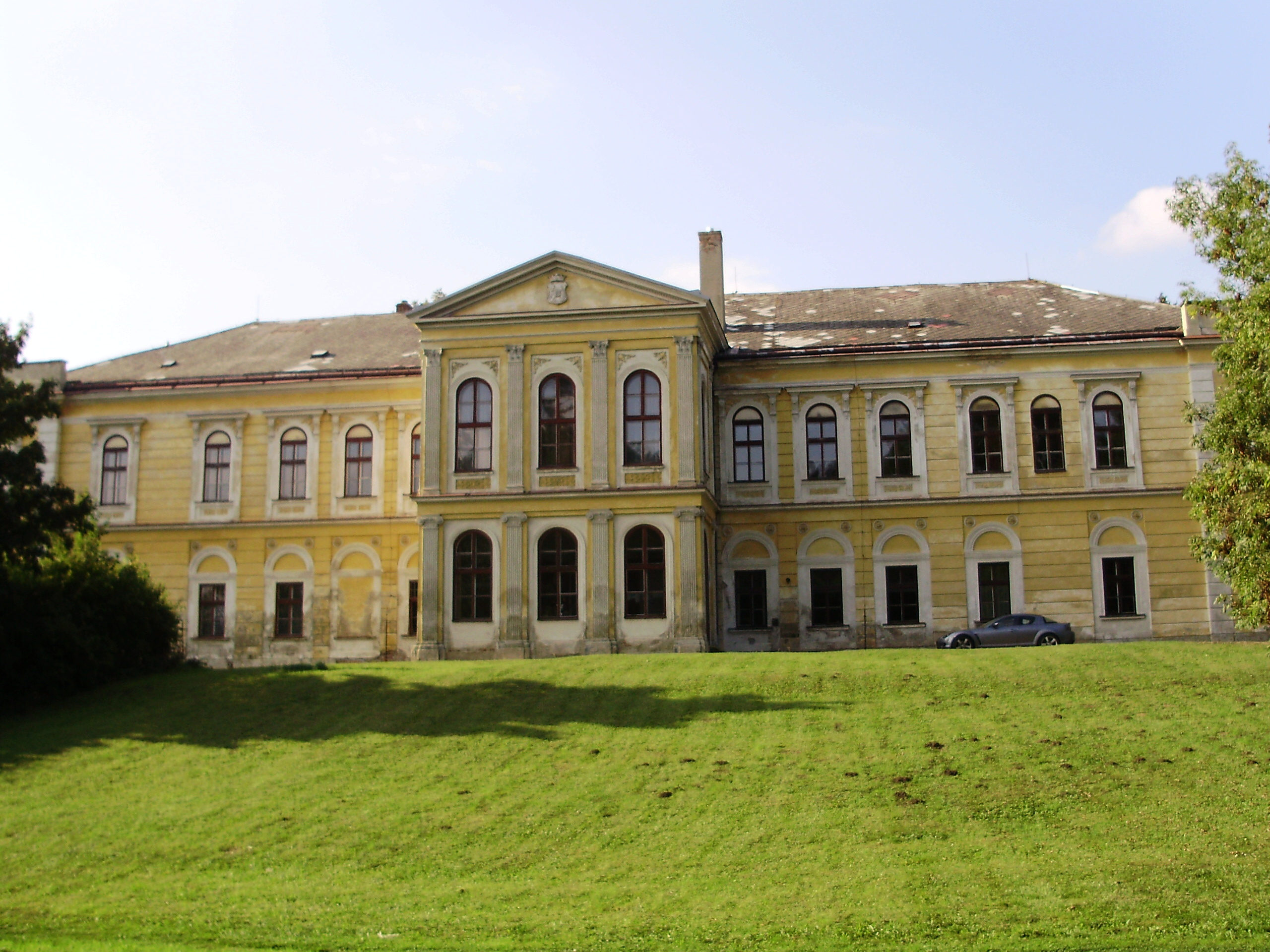
- Bohdalice Castle

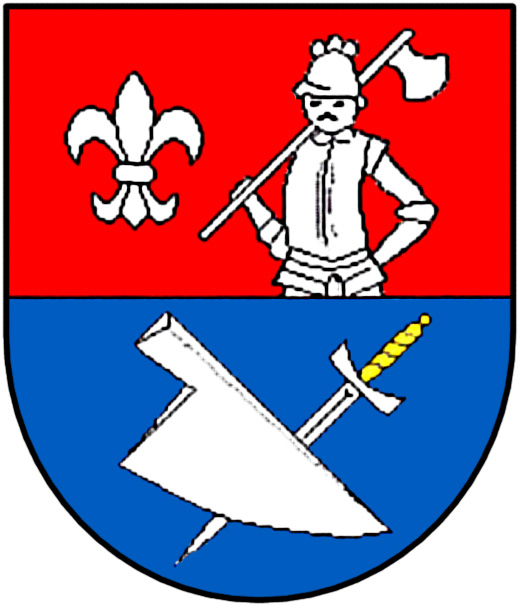
- Flag Coat of arms

- Location in the Czech Republic
- Coordinates: 49°12′45″N 17°1′41″E
- Country: Czech Republic
- Region: South Moravian
- District: Vyškov
- First mentioned: 1337

Area
  - Total: 8.89 km^{2} (3.43 sq mi)
- Elevation: 314 m (1,030 ft)

Population (2026-01-01)
  - Total: 973
  - Density: 109/km^{2} (283/sq mi)
- Time zone: UTC+1 (CET)
  - Summer (DST): UTC+2 (CEST)
- Postal code: 683 41
- Website: www.bohdalice.cz

Bohdalice-Pavlovice is a municipality in Vyškov District in the South Moravian Region of the Czech Republic. It has about 1,000 inhabitants.

== Administrative division ==
Bohdalice-Pavlovice consists of three municipal parts (in brackets population according to the 2021 census):

- Bohdalice (506)
- Manerov (192)
- Pavlovice (147)

Pavlovice forms an exclave of the municipal territory.

== Geography ==
Bohdalice-Pavlovice is located about 7 kilometres (4 mi) south of Vyškov and 28 km (17 mi) east of Brno. It lies in the Litenčice Hills. The highest point is a hill at 433 m (1,421 ft) above sea level. The stream Pavlovický potok flows through Pavlovice and supplies there a system of two small fishponds.

== History ==
The first written mention of Bohdalice is from 1337. Pavlovice was first mentioned in 1371. Manerov was founded in 1785 and later became part of Bohdalice municipality. Bohdalice and Pavlovice were merged into one municipality in 1964.

== Demographics ==
Historical population

| Year | Pop. | ±% |
|---|---|---|
| 1869 | 757 | — |
| 1880 | 826 | +9.1% |
| 1890 | 902 | +9.2% |
| 1900 | 920 | +2.0% |
| 1910 | 957 | +4.0% |

| Year | Pop. | ±% |
|---|---|---|
| 1921 | 957 | +0.0% |
| 1930 | 858 | −10.3% |
| 1950 | 802 | −6.5% |
| 1961 | 955 | +19.1% |
| 1970 | 866 | −9.3% |

| Year | Pop. | ±% |
|---|---|---|
| 1980 | 837 | −3.3% |
| 1991 | 820 | −2.0% |
| 2001 | 810 | −1.2% |
| 2011 | 815 | +0.6% |
| 2021 | 845 | +3.7% |

Source: Censuses

== Transport ==
There are no railways or major roads passing through the municipality.

== Sights ==
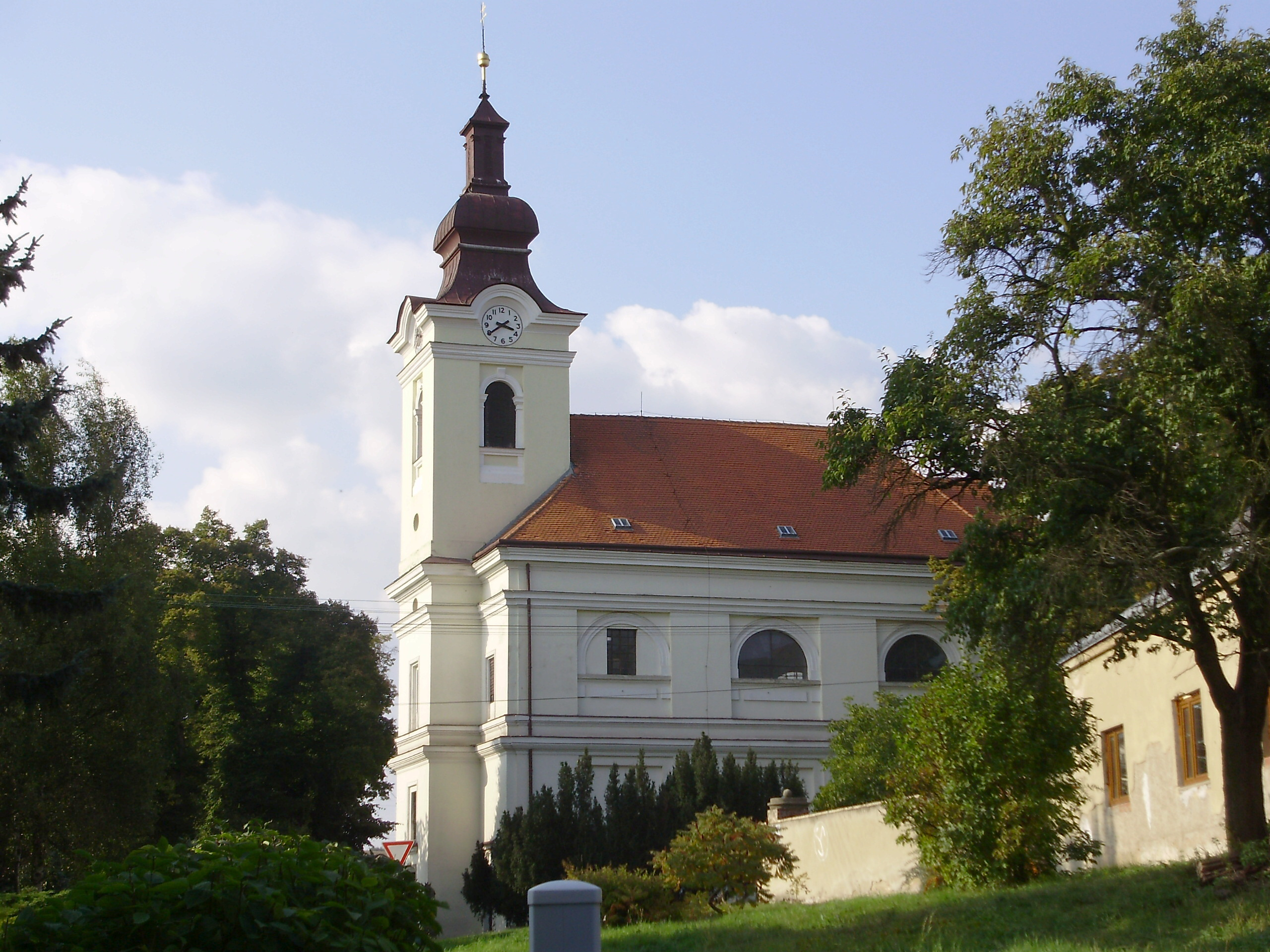
Church of the Assumption of the Virgin Mary

The most important monument is the Church of the Assumption of the Virgin Mary, located in Bohdalice. It was built in the Neoclassical style in 1807–1814 and has late Baroque elements.

Other protected cultural monuments are the Chapel of Saint Francis Xavier in Manerov, dating from 1727, and a calvary in Bohdalice of unknown age.

A notable landmark is the Bohdalice Castle. It was built in the Baroque style at the beginning of the 18th century. In the 19th century, the building was twice rebuilt and acquired a Neoclassical and Empire character. In the 20th century, the castle lost its historical value. Today it houses a school.
