= Kozlany (Třebíč District) =

- Municipality
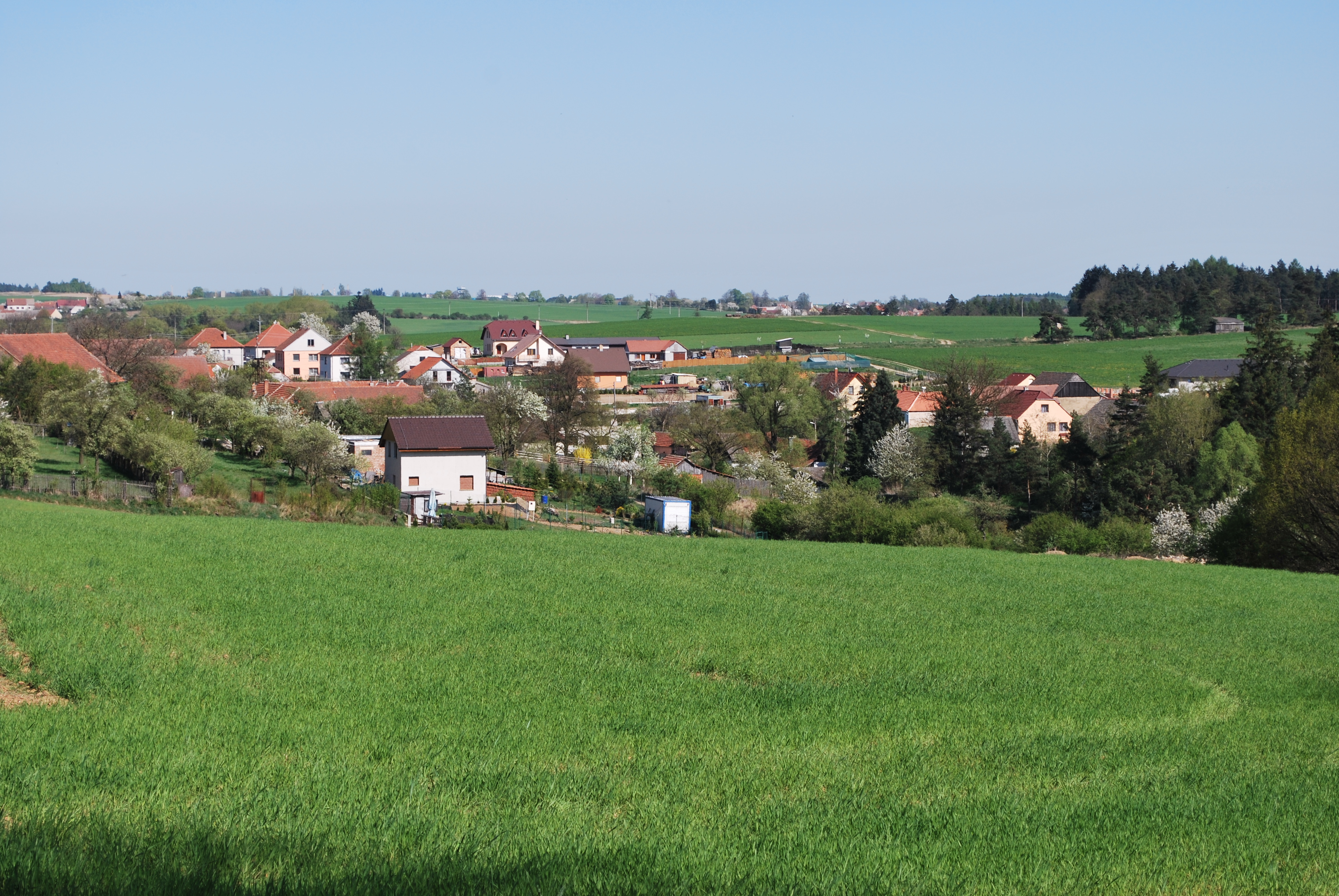
- View from the west

- Location in the Czech Republic
- Coordinates: 49°10′47″N 16°3′40″E
- Country: Czech Republic
- Region: Vysočina
- District: Třebíč
- First mentioned: 1104

Area
  - Total: 3.13 km^{2} (1.21 sq mi)
- Elevation: 435 m (1,427 ft)

Population (2026-01-01)
  - Total: 141
  - Density: 45.0/km^{2} (117/sq mi)
- Time zone: UTC+1 (CET)
  - Summer (DST): UTC+2 (CEST)
- Postal code: 675 02
- Website: www.obeckozlany.cz

Kozlany is a municipality and village in Třebíč District in the Vysočina Region of the Czech Republic. It has about 100 inhabitants.

Kozlany lies approximately 14 kilometres (9 mi) east of Třebíč, 42 km (26 mi) south-east of Jihlava, and 156 km (97 mi) south-east of Prague.

== Demographics ==
Historical population
Year	Pop.	±%
1869	140	—
1880	127	−9.3%
1890	126	−0.8%
1900	126	+0.0%
1910	134	+6.3%
1921	132	−1.5%
1930	149	+12.9%
1950	116	−22.1%
1961	134	+15.5%
1970	140	+4.5%
1980	133	−5.0%
1991	118	−11.3%
2001	117	−0.8%
2011	134	+14.5%
2021	139	+3.7%
Source: Censuses
