= Kučerov =

Municipality in South Moravian Region, Czech Republic

- Municipality
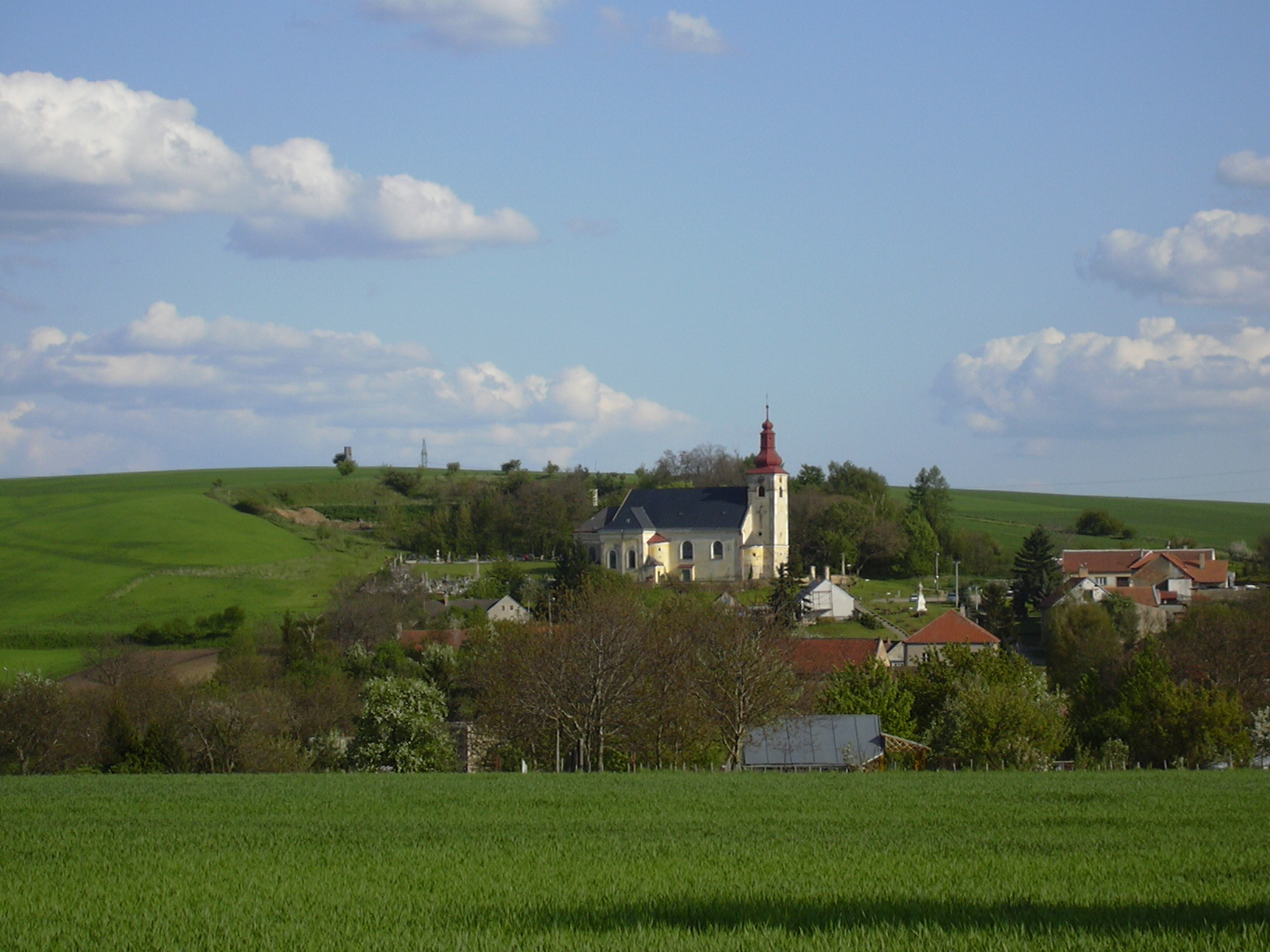
- General view

- Flag Coat of arms

- Location in the Czech Republic
- Coordinates: 49°13′7″N 17°0′19″E
- Country: Czech Republic
- Region: South Moravian
- District: Vyškov
- First mentioned: 1235

Area
  - Total: 8.70 km^{2} (3.36 sq mi)
- Elevation: 291 m (955 ft)

Population (2026-01-01)
  - Total: 494
  - Density: 56.8/km^{2} (147/sq mi)
- Time zone: UTC+1 (CET)
  - Summer (DST): UTC+2 (CEST)
- Postal code: 682 01
- Website: www.kucerov.cz

Kučerov (German: Kutscherau) is a municipality and village in Vyškov District in the South Moravian Region of the Czech Republic. It has about 500 inhabitants.

Kučerov lies approximately 6 kilometres (4 mi) south of Vyškov, 29 km (18 mi) east of Brno, and 210 km (130 mi) south-east of Prague.

== History ==
Until 1945, Kučerov belonged to the German-speaking enclave called Vyškov Language Island. The village was colonised by German settlers in the second half of the 13th century. The coexistence of Czechs and Germans was mostly peaceful, which changed only after 1935, when many Germans tended to Nazism. In 1945, the German-speaking population was expelled.

== Demographics ==
Historical population
| Year | Pop. | ±% |
|---|---|---|
| 1869 | 603 | — |
| 1880 | 601 | −0.3% |
| 1890 | 644 | +7.2% |
| 1900 | 698 | +8.4% |
| 1910 | 706 | +1.1% |
| 1921 | 736 | +4.2% |
| 1930 | 834 | +13.3% |
| 1950 | 626 | −24.9% |
| 1961 | 635 | +1.4% |
| 1970 | 612 | −3.6% |
| 1980 | 501 | −18.1% |
| 1991 | 457 | −8.8% |
| 2001 | 487 | +6.6% |
| 2011 | 448 | −8.0% |
| 2021 | 458 | +2.2% |
Source: Censuses
