= Bohaté Málkovice =

- Municipality
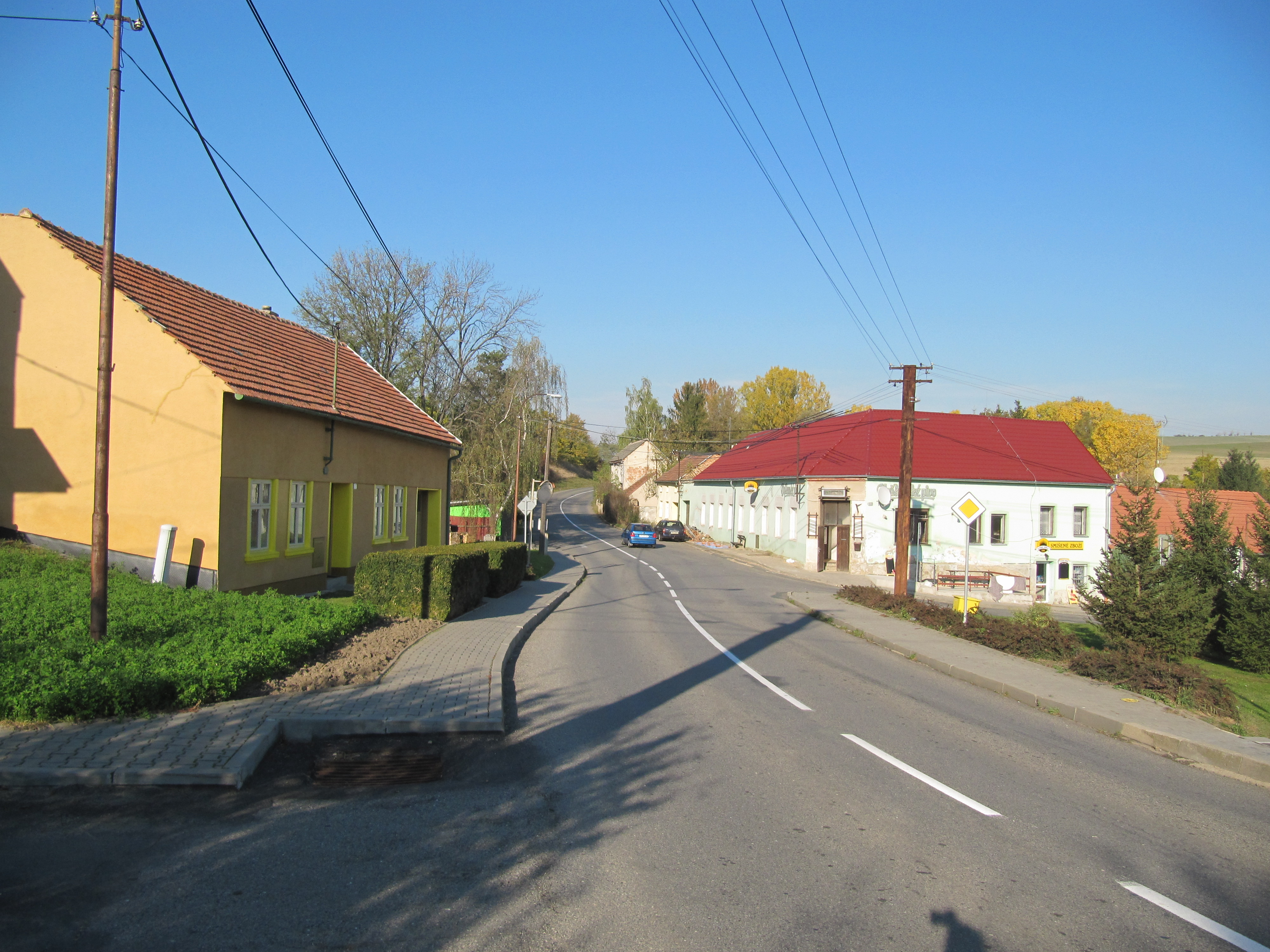
- Main road

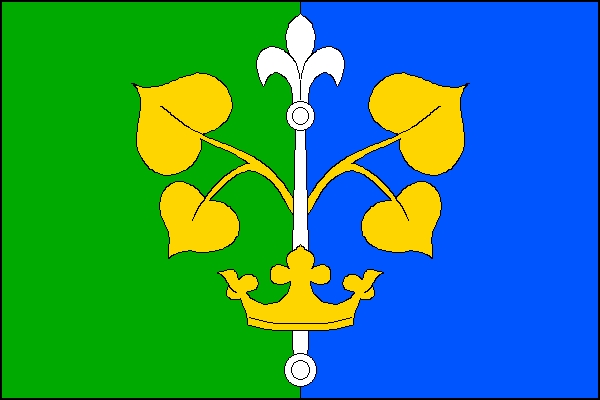
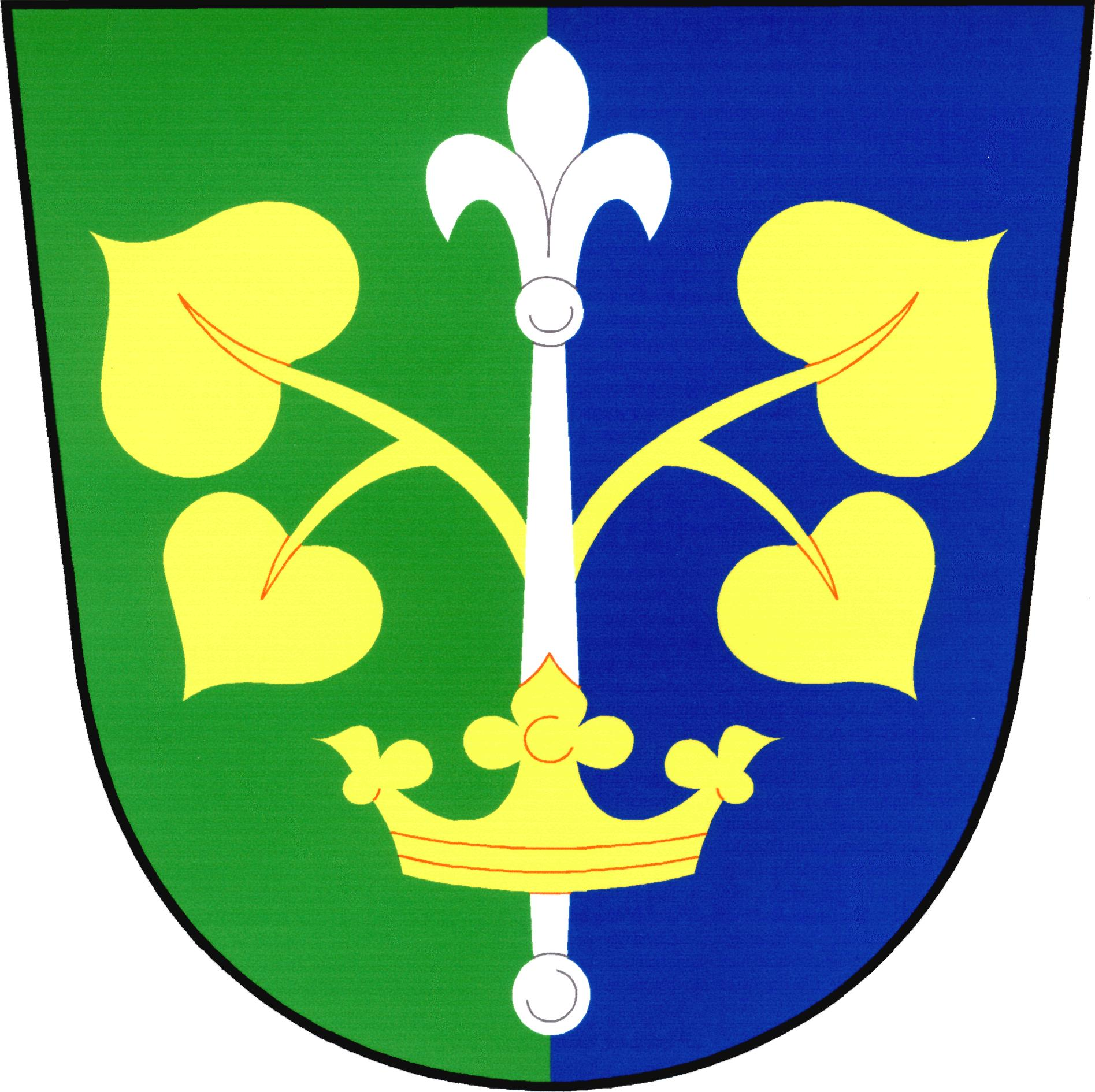
- Flag Coat of arms

- Location in the Czech Republic
- Coordinates: 49°11′19″N 17°0′58″E
- Country: Czech Republic
- Region: South Moravian
- District: Vyškov
- First mentioned: 1349

Area
  - Total: 4.81 km^{2} (1.86 sq mi)
- Elevation: 279 m (915 ft)

Population (2026-01-01)
  - Total: 236
  - Density: 49.1/km^{2} (127/sq mi)
- Time zone: UTC+1 (CET)
  - Summer (DST): UTC+2 (CEST)
- Postal code: 685 01
- Website: www.bohatemalkovice.cz

Bohaté Málkovice is a municipality and village in Vyškov District in the South Moravian Region of the Czech Republic. It has about 200 inhabitants.

Bohaté Málkovice lies approximately 10 kilometres (6 mi) south of Vyškov, 29 km (18 mi) east of Brno, and 212 km (132 mi) south-east of Prague.

== Demographics ==
Historical population
Year	Pop.	±%
1869	290	—
1880	376	+29.7%
1890	389	+3.5%
1900	412	+5.9%
1910	446	+8.3%
1921	493	+10.5%
1930	475	−3.7%
1950	379	−20.2%
1961	377	−0.5%
1970	371	−1.6%
1980	301	−18.9%
1991	263	−12.6%
2001	249	−5.3%
2011	251	+0.8%
2021	236	−6.0%
Source: Censuses
