= Hlubočany =

- Municipality
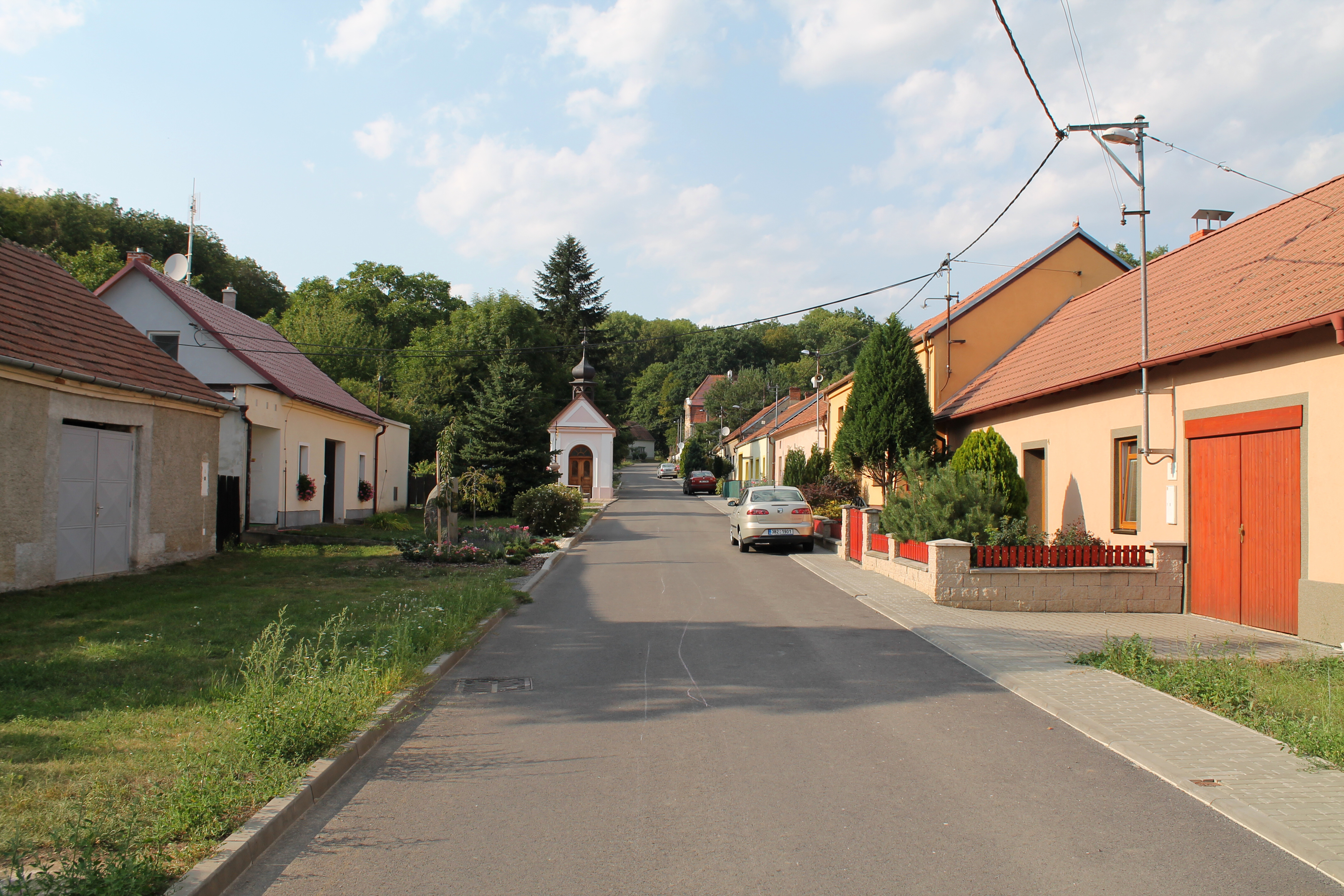
- Terešov, a part of Hlubočany

- Flag Coat of arms

- Location in the Czech Republic
- Coordinates: 49°13′50″N 17°0′1″E
- Country: Czech Republic
- Region: South Moravian
- District: Vyškov
- First mentioned: 1141

Area
  - Total: 8.06 km^{2} (3.11 sq mi)
- Elevation: 273 m (896 ft)

Population (2026-01-01)
  - Total: 553
  - Density: 68.6/km^{2} (178/sq mi)
- Time zone: UTC+1 (CET)
  - Summer (DST): UTC+2 (CEST)
- Postal code: 682 01
- Website: hlubocany.cz

Hlubočany (German: Hobitschau) is a municipality and village in Vyškov District in the South Moravian Region of the Czech Republic. It has about 600 inhabitants.

== Administrative division ==
Hlubočany consists of two municipal parts (in brackets population according to the 2021 census):

- Hlubočany (444)
- Terešov (48)

== Geography ==
Hlubočany is located about 5 kilometres (3 mi) south of Vyškov and 26 km (16 mi) east of Brno. It lies in an agricultural landscape in the Litenčice Hills. The highest point is at 355 m (1,165 ft) above sea level.

== History ==
The first written mention of Hlubočany is from 1141.

Until 1945, Hlubočany and Terešov belonged to the German-speaking enclave called Vyškov Language Island. The area was colonised by German settlers in the second half of the 13th century. The coexistence of Czechs and Germans was mostly peaceful, which changed only after 1935, when many Germans tended to Nazism. In 1945, the German-speaking population was expelled and the municipality was resettled by Czech families.

== Demographics ==
Historical population

Year	Pop.	±%
1869	573	—
1880	600	+4.7%
1890	632	+5.3%
1900	701	+10.9%
1910	773	+10.3%

Year	Pop.	±%
1921	746	−3.5%
1930	748	+0.3%
1950	646	−13.6%
1961	688	+6.5%
1970	626	−9.0%

Year	Pop.	±%
1980	558	−10.9%
1991	489	−12.4%
2001	476	−2.7%
2011	490	+2.9%
2021	492	+0.4%

Source: Censuses

== Transport ==
There are no railways or major roads passing through the municipality.

== Sights ==
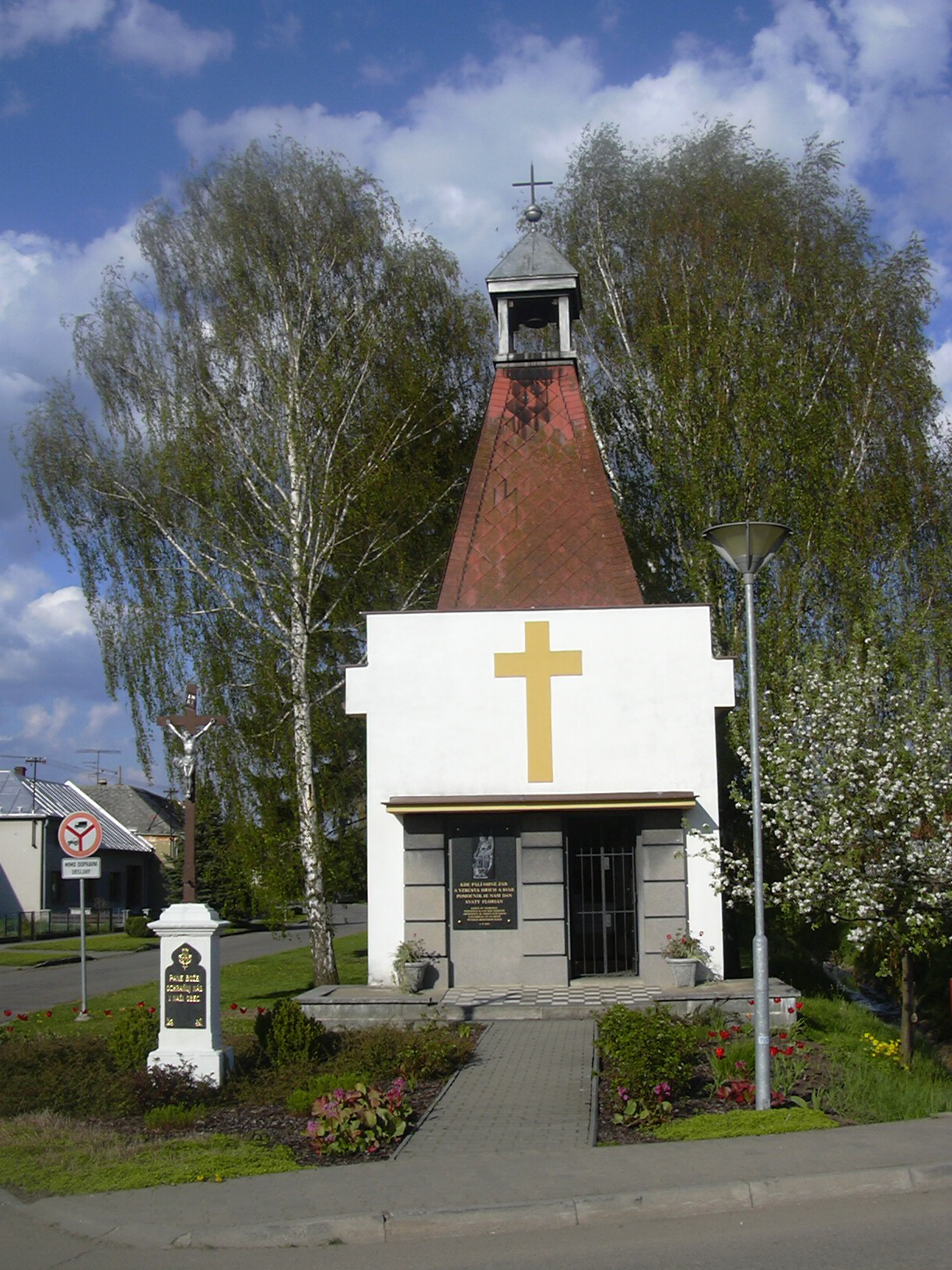
Chapel of Saint Florian

The only protected cultural monument in the municipality is a rural house from the second half of the 19th century, which is evidence of the specific mud houses typical of this region.

In the centre of Hlubočany is the Chapel of Saint Florian. It was built in 1935 on the site of an older Baroque chapel. A small chapel is also in Terešov.
