= Hubert Duifhuis =

Dutch Reformed pastor

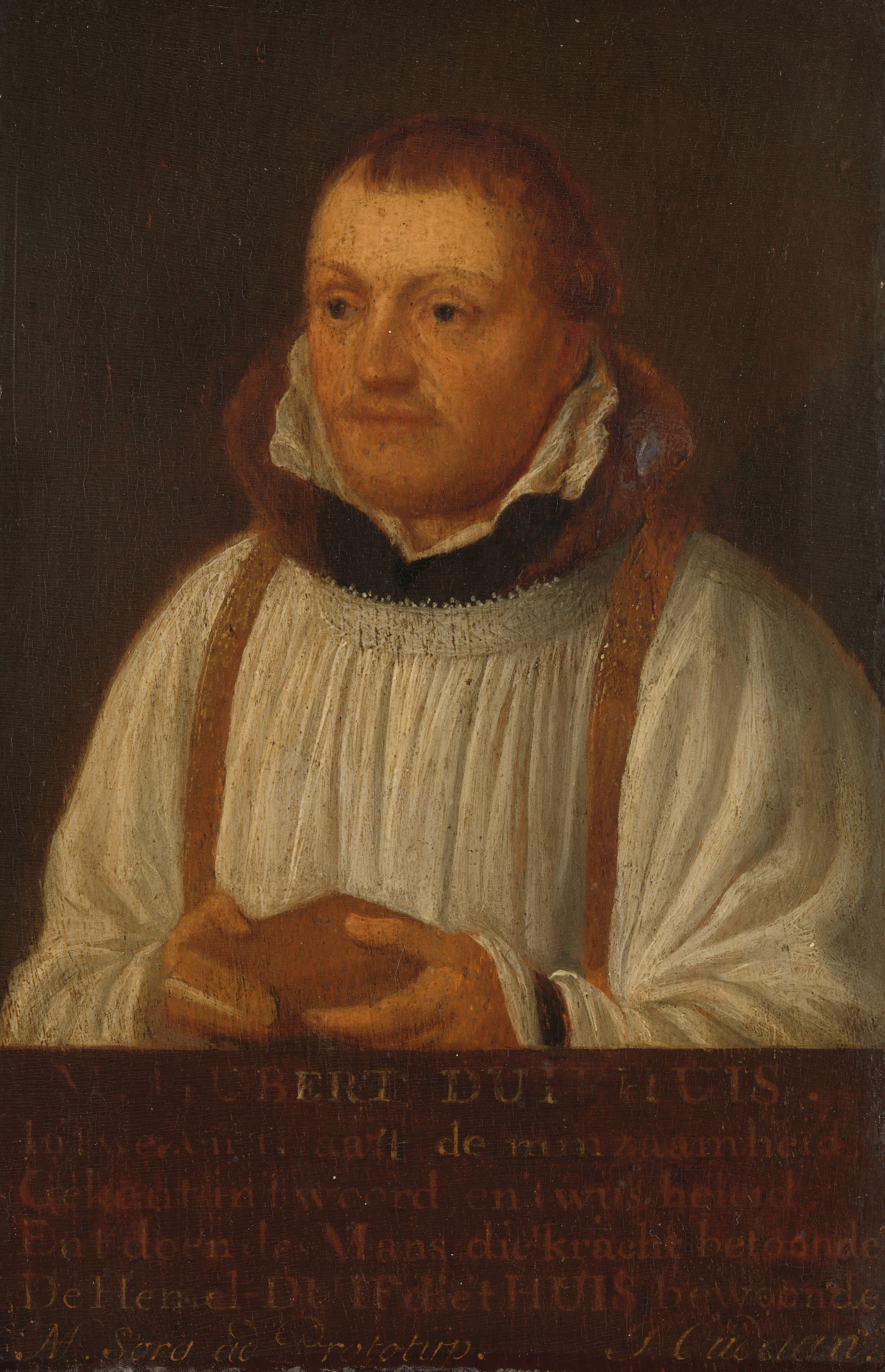
Portrait of Hubert Duifhuis by Hendrik Martenszoon Sorgh, Rijksmuseum

Hubert Duifhuis (Original Dutch: Hubert(us) or Huibert Duyfhuys or Duifhuis, Rotterdam, October 27, 1531 - Utrecht, April 3, 1581) was a Dutch Reformed pastor. He carried out a reformation in the Jacobikerk in 1578, but did not establish a consistory or use a catechism, and he admitted to communion anyone who presented himself (open communion). Werner Helmichius (Werner(us) Helmichius (Utrecht, 1550 - Amsterdam, August 29, 1608, Dutch reformed pastor) opposed open communion, and the church in Utrecht became divided between the Reformed of the Consistory (who opposed open communion) and the Preachers of the Old and New Testament (who promoted it).

Duifhuis was a libertine who opposed Calvinism.

== Bibliography ==
- Israel, Jonathan (1995). The Dutch Republic: Its Rise, Greatness, and Fall, 1477-1806, Oxford Press, pp. 227, 238, 370-371, 424.
