= Hvězdlice =

- Market town
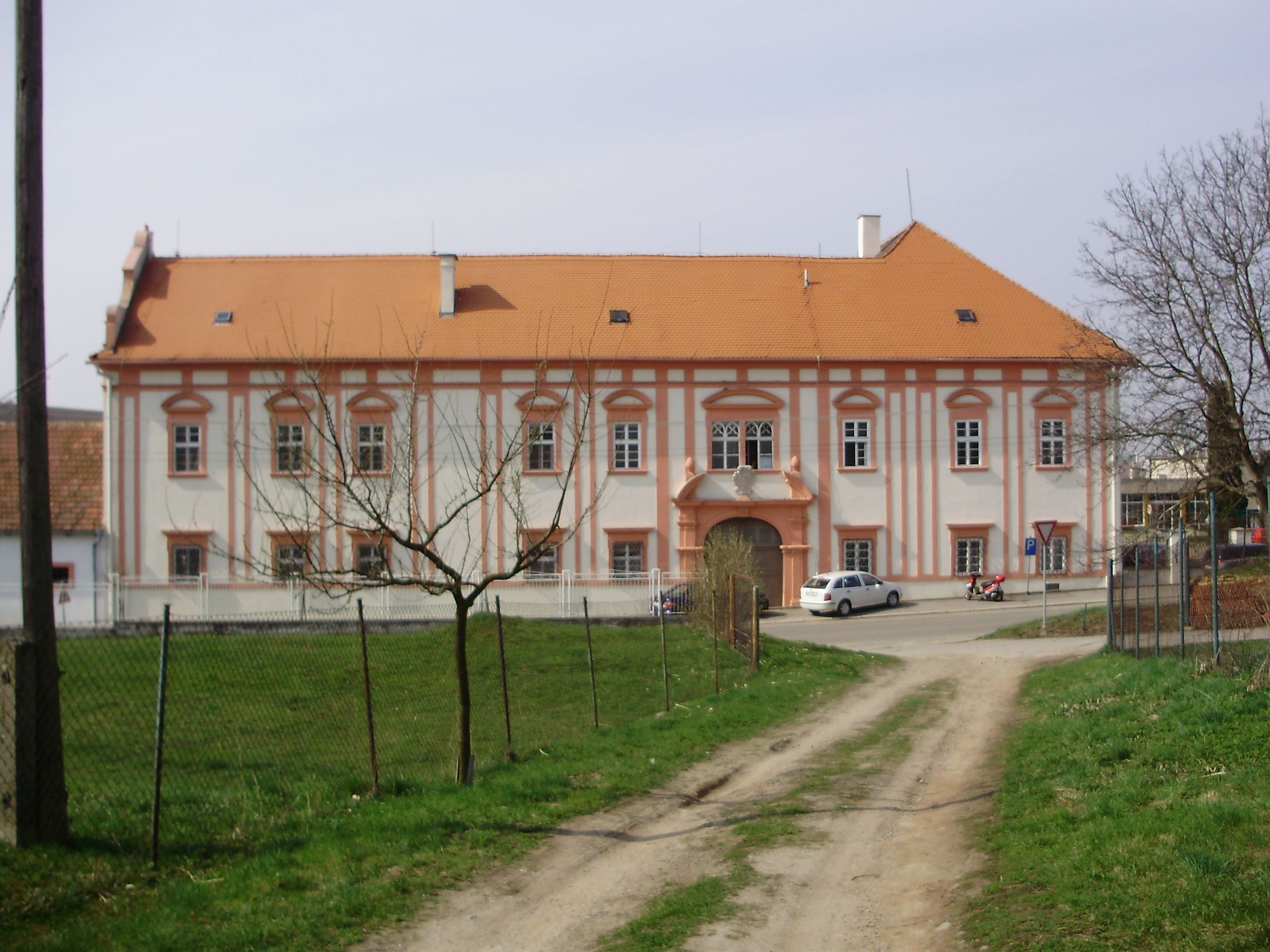
- Nové Hvězdlice Castle

- Flag Coat of arms

- Location in the Czech Republic
- Coordinates: 49°11′36″N 17°5′1″E
- Country: Czech Republic
- Region: South Moravian
- District: Vyškov
- First mentioned: 1282

Area
  - Total: 11.40 km^{2} (4.40 sq mi)
- Elevation: 313 m (1,027 ft)

Population (2026-01-01)
  - Total: 576
  - Density: 50.5/km^{2} (131/sq mi)
- Time zone: UTC+1 (CET)
  - Summer (DST): UTC+2 (CEST)
- Postal code: 683 42
- Website: hvezdlice.cz

Hvězdlice (Czech pronunciation: [ˈɦvjɛzdlɪtsɛ]; German: Neu-Wieslitz) is a market town in Vyškov District in the South Moravian Region of the Czech Republic. It has about 600 inhabitants.

== Administrative division ==
Hvězdlice consists of two municipal parts (in brackets population according to the 2021 census):

- Nové Hvězdlice (524)
- Staré Hvězdlice (79)

== Geography ==
Hvězdlice is located about 11 kilometres (7 mi) southeast of Vyškov and 32 km (20 mi) east of Brno. It lies in the Litenčice Hills. The highest point is at 457 m (1,499 ft) above sea level. The Hvězdlička Stream flows through Nové Hvězdlice.

== History ==
The first written mention of Staré Hvězdlice is from 1282. Nové Hvězdlice was first mentioned in 1353, when there was a fortress. In that year, it was already referred to as a market town. From 1411 until the establishment of a sovereign municipality in 1848, Staré Hvězdlice and Nové Hvězdlice were owned by the St. Thomas's Abbey in Brno.

== Demographics ==
Historical population

Year	Pop.	±%
1869	869	—
1880	1,019	+17.3%
1890	1,039	+2.0%
1900	1,074	+3.4%
1910	1,084	+0.9%

Year	Pop.	±%
1921	1,047	−3.4%
1930	1,148	+9.6%
1950	929	−19.1%
1961	973	+4.7%
1970	879	−9.7%

Year	Pop.	±%
1980	743	−15.5%
1991	679	−8.6%
2001	647	−4.7%
2011	585	−9.6%
2021	603	+3.1%

Source: Censuses

== Transport ==
There are no railways or major roads passing through the municipality.

== Sights ==
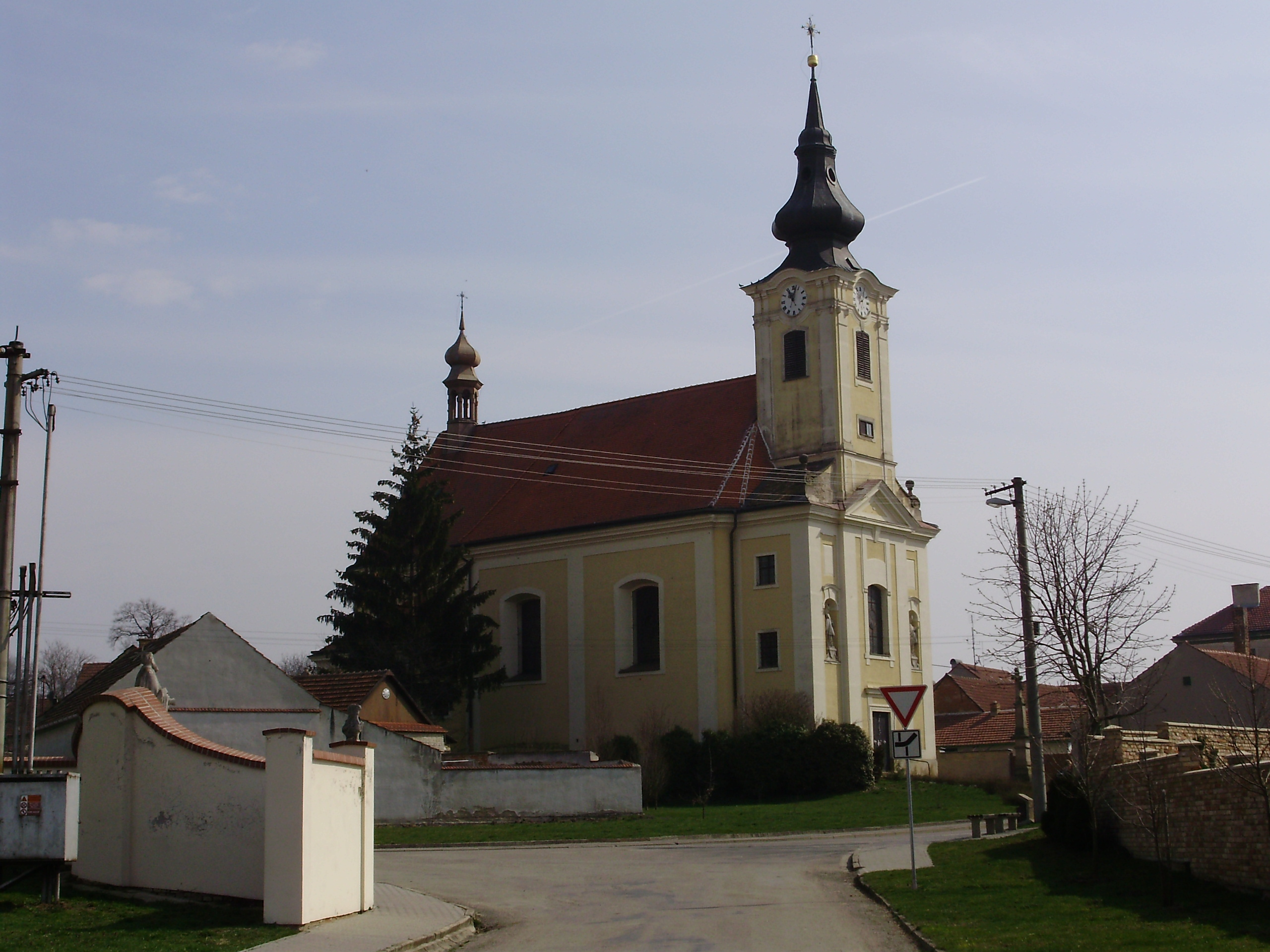
Church of Saint James the Great

The main landmark of Staré Hvězdlice is the Church of Saints Cyril and Methodius and All Saints. It is a Baroque church with a Romanesque core.

The Church of Saint James the Great is located in Nové Hvězdlice. It was built in the late Baroque style in 1770–1773. It has a rich sculptural equipment.

The Nové Hvězdlice Castle was built in the Baroque style in 1712. This architecturally valuable building now houses a retirement home.
