= Kozlany (Vyškov District) =

- Municipality
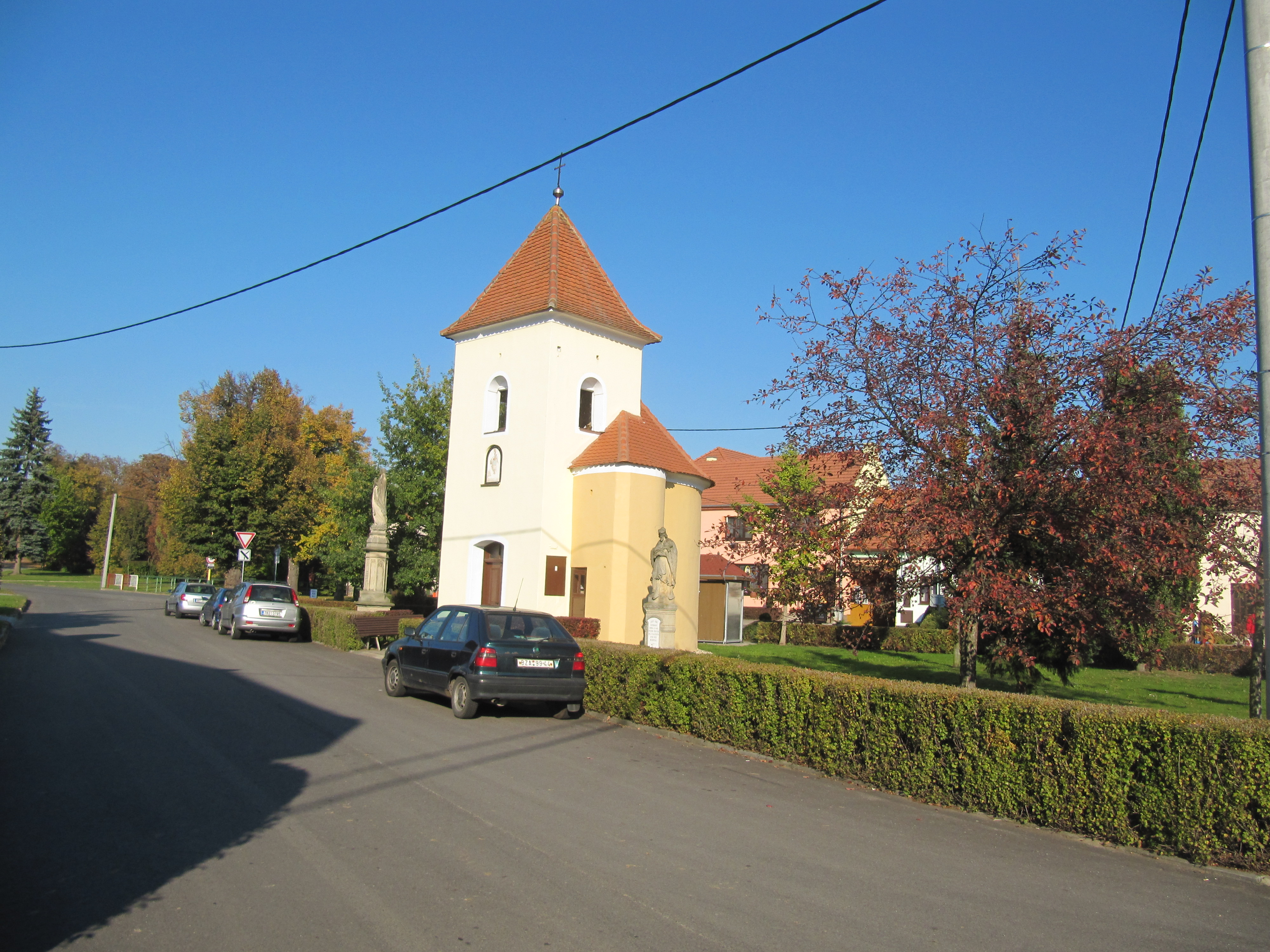
- Centre of Kozlany

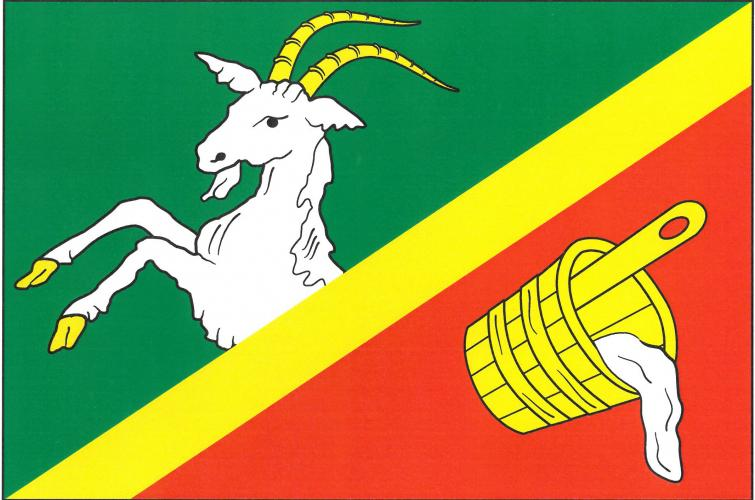
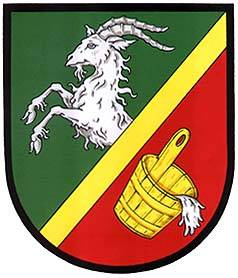
- Flag Coat of arms

- Location in the Czech Republic
- Coordinates: 49°12′15″N 17°2′7″E
- Country: Czech Republic
- Region: South Moravian
- District: Vyškov
- First mentioned: 1360

Area
  - Total: 7.61 km^{2} (2.94 sq mi)
- Elevation: 315 m (1,033 ft)

Population (2026-01-01)
  - Total: 394
  - Density: 51.8/km^{2} (134/sq mi)
- Time zone: UTC+1 (CET)
  - Summer (DST): UTC+2 (CEST)
- Postal code: 684 41
- Website: www.kozlany.eu

Kozlany is a municipality and village in Vyškov District in the South Moravian Region of the Czech Republic. It has about 400 inhabitants.

Kozlany lies approximately 8 kilometres (5 mi) south-east of Vyškov, 31 km (19 mi) east of Brno, and 213 km (132 mi) south-east of Prague.

== Demographics ==
Historical population
Year	Pop.	±%
1869	465	—
1880	499	+7.3%
1890	550	+10.2%
1900	571	+3.8%
1910	587	+2.8%
1921	525	−10.6%
1930	479	−8.8%
1950	445	−7.1%
1961	457	+2.7%
1970	428	−6.3%
1980	397	−7.2%
1991	379	−4.5%
2001	321	−15.3%
2011	300	−6.5%
2021	357	+19.0%
Source: Censuses
