= 1500s =

1500s may refer to:

- The period from 1500 to 1599, almost synonymous with the 16th century (1501–1600)
- 1500s (decade), the period from 1500 to 1509
