= Princes in the Tower =

English royal heirs who disappeared in 1483

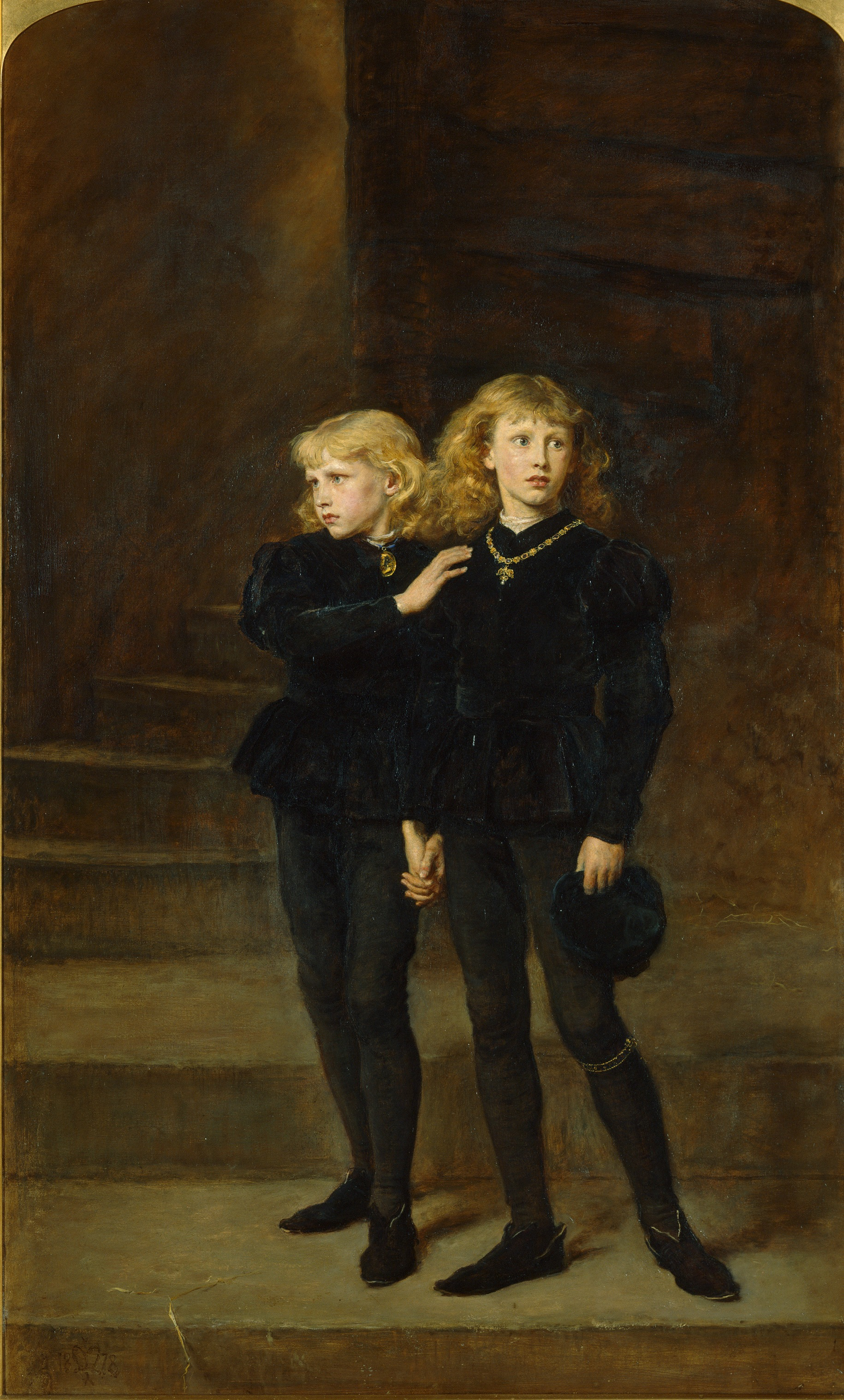
The Two Princes Edward and Richard in the Tower, 1483 by Sir John Everett Millais, 1878, part of the Royal Holloway picture collection. Edward V at right wears the garter of the Order of the Garter beneath his left knee.

The Princes in the Tower refers to the mystery of the fate of the deposed English King Edward V and his younger brother Prince Richard, Duke of York, heirs to the throne of King Edward IV. The brothers were the only surviving sons of the king by his queen, Elizabeth Woodville, and were aged 12 and 9 years old, respectively, at the time of their father's death in April 1483. They were lodged in the Tower of London by their paternal uncle and England's regent, Richard, Duke of Gloucester, in preparation for Edward V's forthcoming coronation. Before the young king's coronation, however, he and his brother were declared illegitimate by Parliament. Gloucester ascended the throne instead as Richard III.

It is unclear what happened to the two princes after the last recorded sighting of them in the tower. It is generally assumed that they were murdered; a common hypothesis is that the murder was commissioned by Richard III in an attempt to secure his hold on the throne. Their deaths may have occurred sometime in 1483, but apart from their disappearance, the only evidence is circumstantial. As a result, several other theories about their fates have been proposed, including the suggestion that they were murdered by their kinsman Henry Stafford, 2nd Duke of Buckingham, their future brother-in-law King Henry VII, or his mother Lady Margaret Beaufort, among others, although theorised culprits besides Stafford and Richard III are generally not given much credence. It has also been suggested that one or both princes may have escaped assassination. In 1487, Lambert Simnel initially claimed to be Prince Richard and was crowned in Dublin as "King Edward VI", but later claimed by others to be the Princes' cousin, Edward Plantagenet, 17th Earl of Warwick. Again, several years later, from 1491 until his capture in 1497, Perkin Warbeck claimed to be the younger prince, Richard, Duke of York, having supposedly escaped to Flanders. Warbeck's claim was supported by some contemporaries, including York's aunt Margaret, Duchess of Burgundy.

In 1674, workmen at the Tower of London excavated, from under a staircase, a wooden box containing two small human skeletons. The bones were widely accepted at the time as those of the princes, but this has not been proven and is far from certain. King Charles II had the bones buried in Westminster Abbey, where they remain.

== Background ==
On 9 April 1483, King Edward IV died unexpectedly after an illness lasting around three weeks. At the time, his son, the new King Edward V, was at Ludlow Castle in Shropshire - the traditional seat of the Prince of Wales - and the dead king's brother, Richard III (then Duke of Gloucester), was at Middleham Castle in Yorkshire. The news reached the Duke of Gloucester around 15 April, although he may have been forewarned of Edward's illness. It is reported that he then went to York Minster to publicly "pledge his loyalty to his new king". The Croyland Chronicle states that, before his death, Edward IV designated his brother Gloucester as Lord Protector. Edward's words may not have mattered, however, since "as the precedent of Henry V showed, the Privy Council was not bound to follow the wishes of a dead king".

Edward V and Gloucester set out for London from the west and north respectively, meeting at Stony Stratford on 29 April. The following morning, Gloucester arrested Edward V's retinue including the boys' uncle, Anthony Woodville, and their half-brother Sir Richard Grey. They were sent to Pontefract Castle in Yorkshire where, on 25 June, Woodville and Grey were beheaded. Gloucester then assumed custody of Edward V himself, prompting his mother Elizabeth Woodville to take her other son, Prince Richard, and her daughters into sanctuary at Westminster Abbey.

Edward V and Gloucester arrived in London together. Planning continued for Edward's official coronation, but the date was postponed from 4 May to 25 June. On 19 May 1483, Edward was lodged in the Tower of London, then the traditional residence of monarchs prior to the coronation. On 16 June, he was joined by his younger brother, Prince Richard, who was previously in sanctuary. At this point, the date of Edward's coronation was indefinitely postponed by their uncle, Gloucester (later Richard III). On Sunday 22 June, a sermon was preached by Dr. Ralph Shaa, brother of the Lord Mayor of London, at St Paul's Cross claiming Gloucester to be the only legitimate heir of the House of York. On 25 June, "a group of lords, knights and gentlemen" petitioned Richard III to take the throne. Both princes were subsequently declared illegitimate by Parliament; this was confirmed in 1484 by an Act of Parliament known as Titulus Regius. The act stated that Edward IV and Elizabeth Woodville's marriage was invalid because of Edward's pre-contract of marriage with Lady Eleanor Talbot. Gloucester was crowned King Richard III of England on 6 July. The declaration of the boys' illegitimacy has been described by historian Rosemary Horrox as an ex post facto justification for Richard III's accession.

== Disappearance ==
Dominic Mancini, an Italian friar who visited England in the 1480s and who was in London in the spring and summer of 1483, recorded that after Richard III seized the throne, Edward V and his younger brother Prince Richard were taken into the "inner apartments of the Tower" and then were seen less and less, until they disappeared altogether. Mancini records that, during this period, Edward V was regularly visited by a doctor, who reported that Edward, "like a victim prepared for sacrifice, sought remission of his sins by daily confession and penance, because he believed that death was facing him". The Latin reference to "Argentinus medicus", was originally translated as "a Strasbourg doctor"; however, D.E. Rhodes suggests it may actually refer to "Doctor Argentine", whom Rhodes identifies as John Argentine, an English physician who later served as provost of King's College, Cambridge, and as doctor to Prince Arthur, eldest son of King Henry VII (Henry Tudor).

There are reports of the two princes being seen playing in the tower grounds shortly after Prince Richard joined his elder brother, but there are no recorded sightings of either of them after the summer of 1483. An attempt to rescue them in late July failed. Their fate remains an enduring mystery.

Many historians believe that the princes were murdered; some have suggested that the act may have happened towards the end of summer 1483. Maurice Keen argues that the rebellion against Richard III in 1483 initially "aimed to rescue Edward V and his brother from the Tower before it was too late", but that, when Henry Stafford, Duke of Buckingham, became involved, it shifted to support of Henry Tudor because "Buckingham almost certainly knew that the princes in the Tower were dead." Historian Alison Weir proposes 3 September 1483 as a potential date; however, Weir's work has been criticised for "arriving at a conclusion that depends more on her own imagination than on the uncertain evidence she has so misleadingly presented".

Clements Markham suggests the princes may have been alive as late as July 1484, pointing to the regulations issued by Richard III's household which stated: "the children should be together at one breakfast". James Gairdner, however, argues that it is unclear to whom the phrase "the children" alludes, and that it may not have been a reference to the princes. It may refer to Edward, Earl of Warwick (son of the Duke of Clarence) and Edward IV's two youngest daughters (Catherine and Bridget), all of whom were living under Richard's care at Sheriff Hutton.

=== Rumours ===
Several sources suggest there were rumours of the princes' deaths in the time following their disappearance. Rumours of murder appeared in France. In January 1484, Guillaume de Rochefort, Lord Chancellor of France, urged the Estates General to "take warning" from the fate of the princes, as their own king, Charles VIII, was only 13. The early reports, including that of Rochefort, Philippe de Commines (French politician), Caspar Weinreich (contemporary German chronicler), and Jan Allertz (Recorder of Rotterdam), all state that Richard killed the princes before he seized the throne (thus before June 1483). De Commines' Memoirs (c.1500), however, identifies the Duke of Buckingham as the person "who put them to death".

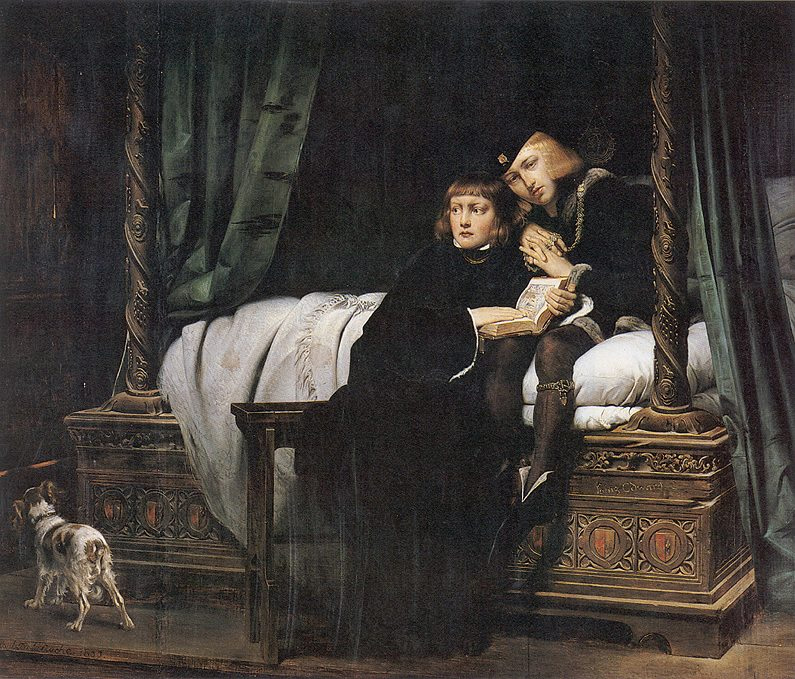
King Edward V and the Duke of York (Richard) in the Tower of London by Paul Delaroche. The theme of innocent children awaiting an uncertain fate was popular among 19th-century painters. Edward V is again depicted wearing the emblem of the Order of the Garter. Louvre, Paris.

Other than their disappearance, there is no direct evidence that the princes were murdered, and "no reliable, well-informed, independent or impartial sources" for the associated events. Nevertheless, following their disappearance, rumours spread in France that they had been murdered. Before November 2023, only one contemporary narrative account of the boys' time in the tower was known to exist: that of Dominic Mancini. Mancini's account was not discovered until 1934, in the Municipal Library in Lille. Later accounts written after the accession of Henry Tudor are usually biased or influenced by Tudor propaganda.

Only Mancini's account, written in London before November 1483, is contemporary. The Croyland Chronicle and de Commines' account were written three and seventeen years later, respectively (and thus after Richard III's death and the accession of Henry VII). Markham, writing long before Mancini's account was discovered, argued that some accounts, including the Croyland Chronicle, might have been authored or heavily influenced by John Morton, Archbishop of Canterbury, in order to incriminate Richard III.

=== Early writers ===
KING RICHARD III
Darest thou resolve to kill a friend of mine?
TYRREL
Ay, my lord;
But I had rather kill two enemies.
KING RICHARD III
Why, there thou hast it: two deep enemies,
Foes to my rest and my sweet sleep's disturbers
Are they that I would have thee deal upon:
Tyrrel, I mean those bastards in the Tower.

– William Shakespeare's King Richard III (Act IV, scene II)

Robert Fabyan's Chronicles of London, compiled around 30 years after the princes' disappearance, names Richard III as murderer.

Thomas More (a Tudor loyalist who had grown up in the household of archbishop John Morton, an avowed foe of Richard III) wrote The History of King Richard III, c.1513. This identified Sir James Tyrrell as the murderer, acting on Richard's orders. Tyrrell was the loyal servant of Richard III who is said to have confessed to the murder of the princes before his execution for treason in 1502. In his history, More said that the princes were smothered to death in their beds by two agents of Tyrrell (Miles Forrest and John Dighton) and were then buried "at the stayre foote, metely depe in the grounde vnder a great heape of stones", but were later disinterred and buried in a secret place. (Metely is a Middle English word describing a size as "moderate, normal, average.") Historian Tim Thornton claimed that the sons of Miles Forrest were at court in Henry VIII's England, and Thomas More's contacts with them could have given him the detail of the murder. More wrote his account with the intention of writing about a moral point rather than a closely mirrored history. While More's account does rely on some firsthand sources, the account is generally taken from other sources.

Holinshed's Chronicles, written in the second half of the 16th century, claims that the princes were murdered by Richard III. The chronicles and Thomas More's account were one of the main sources used by William Shakespeare for his play Richard III, which also portrays Richard as the murderer, in the sense that he commissions Tyrrell to have the boys killed. Historian A. J. Pollard believes that the chronicle's account reflected the contemporary "standard and accepted account", but that by the time it was written, "propaganda had been transformed into historical fact".

Polydore Vergil, in his Anglica Historia (c.1513), also specifies that Tyrrell was the murderer, stating that he "rode sorrowfully to London" and committed the deed with reluctance, upon Richard III's orders, and that Richard himself spread the rumours of the princes' death in the belief that it would discourage rebellion.

== Bodies ==
=== Tower of London ===
On 17 July 1674, workmen remodelling the Tower of London dug up a wooden box containing two small human skeletons. The bones were found buried 10 feet (3.0 m) under the staircase leading to the chapel of the White Tower. The remains were not the first children's skeletons found within the tower; the bones of two children had previously been found "in an old chamber that had been walled up", which Pollard suggests could equally well have been those of the princes. The reason the bones were attributed to the princes was because the location partially matched the account given by More. However, More further stated that they were later moved to a "better place", which disagrees with where the bones were discovered. The staircase that the bones were found underneath had not yet been built, at the time of Richard III. One anonymous report was that they were found with "pieces of rag and velvet about them"; the velvet could indicate that the bodies were those of aristocrats. Four years after their discovery, the bones were placed in an urn and, on the orders of King Charles II, interred in Westminster Abbey, in the wall of the Henry VII Lady Chapel. A monument designed by Christopher Wren marks the resting place of the putative princes. The inscription, written in Latin, states "Here lie interred the remains of Edward V, King of England, and Richard, Duke of York, whose long desired and much sought after bones, after over a hundred and ninety years, were found interred deep beneath the rubble of the stairs that led up to the Chapel of the White Tower, on the 17 of July in the Year of Our Lord 1674."

The bones were removed and examined in 1933 by the archivist of Westminster Abbey, Lawrence Tanner; a leading anatomist, William Wright; and the president of the Dental Association, George Northcroft. By measuring certain bones and teeth, they concluded the bones belonged to two children around the correct ages for the princes. The bones were found to have been interred carelessly along with chicken and other animal bones. There were also three very rusty nails. One skeleton was larger than the other, but many of the bones were missing, including part of the smaller jawbone and all of the teeth from the larger one. Many of the bones had been broken by the original workmen. The examination has been criticised, on the grounds that it was conducted on the presumption that the bones were those of the princes and concentrated only on whether the bones showed evidence of suffocation; no attempt was even made to determine whether the bones were male or female.

No further scientific examination has since been conducted on the bones, which remain in Westminster Abbey. Further DNA analysis (if DNA could be obtained) has not been attempted. A petition was started in 2013 on the British government's "e-petition" website requesting that the bones be DNA tested, but was closed months before its expected close date. If it had received 100,000 signatories a parliamentary debate would have been triggered. Pollard points out that even if modern DNA and carbon dating proved the bones belonged to the princes, it would not prove who or what killed them.

=== St George's Chapel ===
In 1789, workmen carrying out repairs in St. George's Chapel, Windsor, rediscovered and accidentally broke into the vault of Edward IV and Queen Elizabeth Woodville, discovering in the process what appeared to be a small adjoining vault. This vault was found to contain the coffins of two unidentified children. However, no inspection or examination was carried out and the tomb was resealed. The tomb was inscribed with the names of two of Edward IV's children: George, 1st Duke of Bedford, who had died at the age of 2, and Mary of York who had died at the age of 14; both had predeceased the king. However, two lead coffins clearly labelled as George Plantagenet and Mary Plantagenet were subsequently discovered elsewhere in the chapel (during the excavation for the royal tomb house for King George III under the Wolsey tomb-house in 1810–13), and were moved into the adjoining vault of Edward IV, but at the time no effort was made to identify the two lead coffins already in Edward IV's vault.

In the late 1990s, work was being carried out near and around Edward IV's tomb in St George's Chapel; the floor area was excavated to replace an old boiler and also to add a new repository for the remains of future Deans and Canons of Windsor. A request was forwarded to the Dean and Canons of Windsor to consider a possible examination of the two vaults either by fibre-optic camera or, if possible, a reexamination of the two unidentified lead coffins in the tomb also housing the remains of two of Edward IV's children that were discovered during the building of the Royal Tomb for King George III (1810–13) and placed in the adjoining vault at that time. Royal consent would be necessary to open any royal tomb, so it was felt best to leave the medieval mystery unsolved for at least the next few generations. The 2012 discovery of the remains of Richard III has prompted renewed interest in re-excavating the skeletons of the "two princes", but Queen Elizabeth II never granted the approval required for any such testing of an interred royal. In 2022, Tracy Borman, joint chief curator of Historic Royal Palaces, stated that King Charles III held "a very different view" on the subject and could potentially support an investigation.

== Theories ==
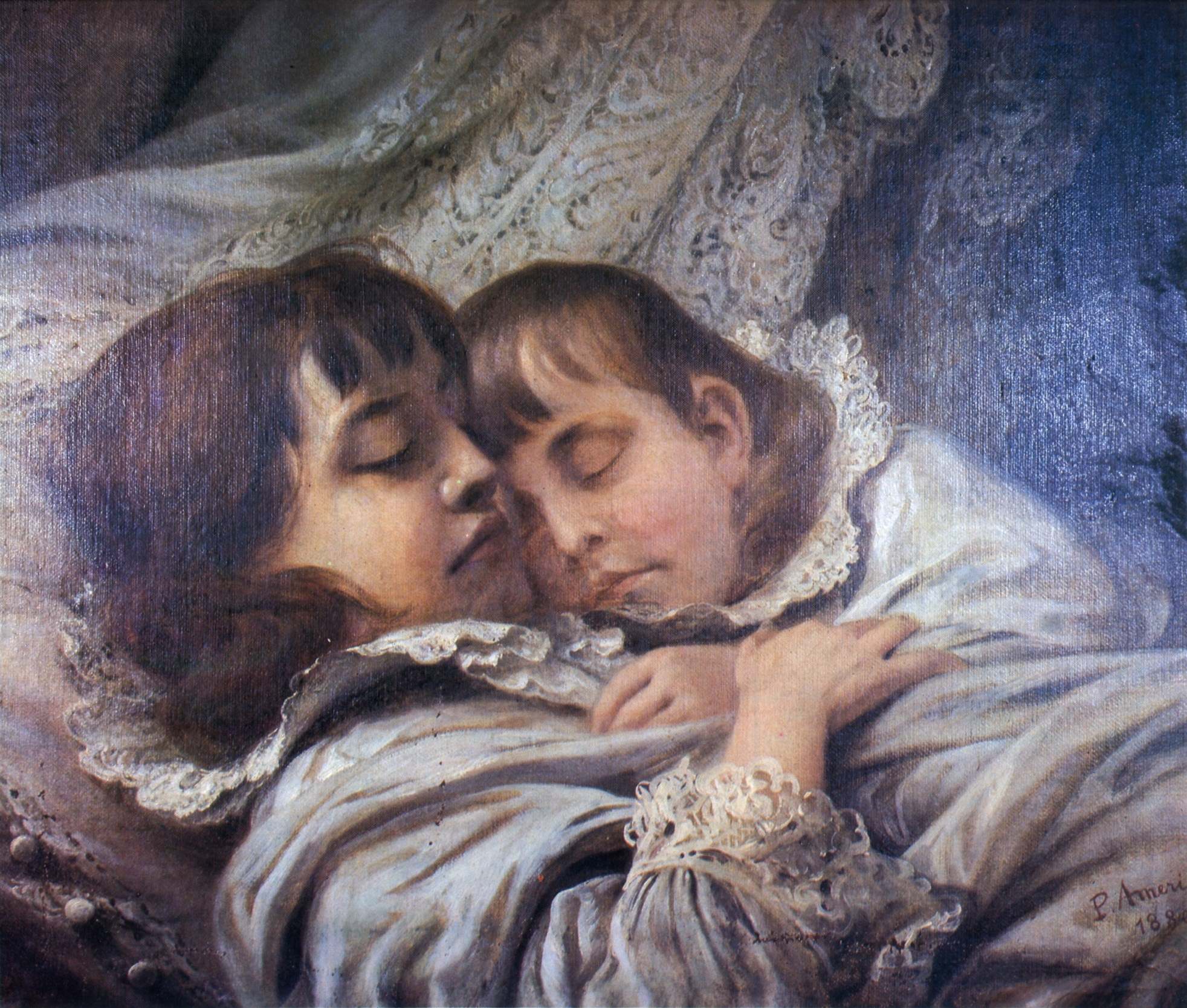
The sons of Edward IV of England by Pedro Américo

The absence of hard evidence of what happened to the princes has led to a number of theories being put forward. The most common theory is that they were murdered close to the time that they disappeared, and, among historians and authors who accept the murder theory, the most common explanation is that they were murdered at the behest of Richard III.

=== Richard III ===
Many historians assert that Richard III, the princes' uncle, is the likeliest culprit in the case of the disappearance of the princes for a number of reasons. Although the princes had been eliminated from the succession, Richard's hold on the monarchy was very insecure due to the way in which he had attained the crown, leading to a backlash against him by the Yorkist establishment. An attempt had already been made to rescue them and restore Edward V to the throne, clear evidence that the existence of the princes would remain a threat as long as they were alive. The boys could have been used by Richard's enemies as figureheads for rebellion. Rumours of their death were in circulation by late 1483, but Richard never attempted to prove that they were alive by having them seen in public, which strongly suggests that they were dead by then. Richard also failed to open any investigation into his nephews' disappearance, which would have been in his interest if he was innocent. However, he apparently did not remain silent on the matter. Raphael Holinshed, in his Chronicles of England, Scotland and Ireland, written in 1577, reports that Richard, "what with purging and declaring his innocence concerning the murder of his nephews towards the world, and what with cost to obtain the love and favour of the communal tie (which outwardlie glosed, and openly dissembled with him) ... gave prodigally so many and so great rewards, that now both he lacked, and scarce with honesty how to borrow".

Richard was on a progression through the Yorkist heartlands at the time the princes were last seen alive. They were under guard in the Tower of London, which was controlled by his men, and access to them was strictly limited by his instructions. It is unlikely they could have been murdered without his knowledge. More and Polydore Vergil both name Sir James Tyrrell as the murderer. Tyrrell, an English knight who fought for the House of York on many occasions, was arrested by Henry VII's forces in 1502 for supporting another Yorkist claimant to the throne. Shortly before his execution, Tyrrell is said by More to have admitted, under torture, to having murdered the princes at the behest of Richard III. The only record of this is the writing of Thomas More, who wrote that, during his examination, Tyrrell made his confession as to the murders, saying that Richard III ordered their deaths. He also implicated two other men - relatives of these accomplices were present at the Tudor court, and More may have at least partially derived his account from them - despite further questioning, however, Tyrrell was unable to say where the bodies were, claiming that Brackenbury (who had died in the Battle of Bosworth Field 17 years previously) had moved them. William Shakespeare portrays Tyrrell as the culprit, sought out by Richard after Buckingham demurs. This version of events is accepted by Alison Weir and Hicks notes that his successful career and rapid promotion after 1483 "is consistent with his alleged murder of the princes". However, the only record of Tyrrell's confession is through More, and "no actual confession has ever been found". Pollard casts doubts on the accuracy of More's accounts, suggesting it was "an elaboration of one of several circulating accounts"; however, he does not discount the possibility of it being "just his own invention", pointing to the "clear similarities to the stories of the Babes in the Wood". Clements Markham suggested that More's account was actually written by Archbishop Morton and that Tyrrell was induced to do the deed by Henry VII between 16 June and 16 July 1486, the dates of two general pardons that he received from the king.

However, a registry copy of a will dated to 1516 has been rediscovered in the British National Archives, that of Tyrrell's sister-in-law Dame Margaret Arundell, wife of William Capel, in which she bequeaths a gold chain to her son Giles that had belonged to her husband and before him, to Edward V, possibly his chain of office. William Capel appears to have given the chain to his wife while he was alive, as it is not mentioned in his will, nor is it mentioned in the will of Giles or any of his descendants. Although it is unknown how the chain came into William's possession, he is recorded to have exchanged jewellery with the Tyrrells. This revelation has revived interest in More's account.

Richard's guilt was widely accepted by contemporaries. George Cely, Dominic Mancini, John Rous, Robert Fabyan's Chronicle of London, the Croyland Chronicle, and the London Chronicle all noted the disappearance of the Princes, and all bar Mancini (who noted that he had no knowledge of what had happened) repeated rumours naming Richard as the murderer. Guillaume de Rochefort, Chancellor of France, named Richard as the murderer to the Estates General at Tours in January 1484. It also appears to have been the belief of the Princes' mother Elizabeth Woodville, who would go on to support Henry Tudor in his campaign against Richard III. One possible motive for Elizabeth Woodville subsequently making her peace with Richard III, and bringing her daughters out of sanctuary, could be that Richard had to swear a solemn oath, before witnesses, to protect and provide for her surviving children, which made it much less likely they could be quietly murdered as it was believed their brothers had been.

In line with this contemporary opinion many current historians, including David Starkey, Michael Hicks, Helen Castor and A. J. Pollard regard Richard himself as the most likely culprit. There was no formal accusation against Richard III on the matter; the Bill of Attainder brought by Henry VII made no definitive mention of the Princes in the Tower, but it did accuse Richard of "the unnatural, mischievous and great perjuries, treasons, homicides and murders, in shedding of infant's blood, with many other wrongs, odious offences and abominations against God and man". The "shedding of infant's blood" may be an accusation of the Princes' murder. Hicks speculated that it was a reference to speeches made in Parliament condemning the murder of the princes, which suggested that Richard's guilt had become common knowledge, or at least common wisdom.

=== Henry Stafford, 2nd Duke of Buckingham ===
The plausibility of Henry Stafford, 2nd Duke of Buckingham, Richard III's right-hand man, as a suspect depends on the princes having already been dead by the time Stafford was executed in November 1483. It has been suggested that Buckingham had several potential motives. As a descendant of Edward III, through Thomas of Woodstock, on his father's side, as well as through John of Gaunt, through John Beaufort, on his mother's side, Buckingham may have hoped to accede to the throne himself in due course; alternatively, he may have been acting on behalf of a third party.

Some, notably Paul Murray Kendall, regard Buckingham as the likeliest suspect: his execution, after he had rebelled against Richard in October 1483, might signify that he and the king had fallen out; Weir takes this as a sign that Richard had murdered the princes without Buckingham's knowledge and Buckingham had been shocked by it. A contemporary Portuguese document suggests Buckingham as the guilty party, stating "... and after the passing away of King Edward in the year of 83, another one of his brothers, the Duke of Gloucester, had in his power the Prince of Wales and the Duke of York, the young sons of the said king and his brother, and turned them to the Duke of Buckingham, under whose custody the said Princes were starved to death". A document dated some decades after the disappearance was found within the archives of the College of Arms in London in 1980; this stated that the murder "be the vise of the Duke of Buckingham". This led Michael Bennett to suggest that possibly some of Richard's prominent supporters, Buckingham and James Tyrrell, murdered the princes on their own initiative without waiting for Richard's orders. Bennett noted in support of this theory: "After the King's departure Buckingham was in effective command in the capital, and it is known that when the two men met a month later there was an unholy row between them."

Buckingham is the only person to be named as responsible in a contemporary chronicle other than Richard himself. However, for two reasons he is unlikely to have acted alone. First of all, if he were guilty of acting without Richard's orders, it is extremely surprising that Richard did not lay the blame for the princes' murder on Buckingham after Buckingham was disgraced and executed, especially as Richard could potentially have cleared his own name by doing so. Secondly, it is likely he would have required Richard's help to gain access to the princes, under close guard in the Tower of London, although Kendall argued as Constable of England, he might have been exempt from this ruling. As a result, although it is extremely possible that he was implicated in the decision to murder them, the hypothesis that he acted without Richard's knowledge is not widely accepted by historians. While Jeremy Potter suggested that Richard would have kept silent had Buckingham been guilty because nobody would have believed Richard was not party to the crime, he further notes that "Historians are agreed that Buckingham would never have dared to act without Richard's complicity, or at least, connivance". However, Potter also hypothesised that perhaps Buckingham was fantasising about seizing the crown himself at this point and saw the murder of the princes as a first step to achieving this goal. This theory formed the basis of Sharon Penman's historical novel, The Sunne in Splendour.

=== Henry VII ===
Henry VII (Henry Tudor), following his seizure of the crown, executed some of the rival claimants to the throne. John of Gloucester, illegitimate son of Richard III, is said by some sources to have been one of those executed. Henry was out of the country between the princes' disappearance and August 1485, thus his only opportunity to murder them would have been after his accession in 1485. Pollard suggests Henry (or those acting on his orders) is "the only plausible alternative to Richard III".

The year after becoming king, Henry VII married the princes' eldest sister, Elizabeth, to reinforce his claim to the throne. Not wanting the legitimacy of his wife or her claim as heir of Edward IV called into question, prior to the marriage he had repealed the Titulus Regius, which had previously declared the princes (and his wife Elizabeth) illegitimate. Markham (1906) suggested that the princes were executed under Henry's orders between 16 June and 16 July 1486, claiming that it was only after this date that orders went out to circulate the story that Richard had killed the princes; this claim has been disproven. Markham also suggested that the princes' mother, Elizabeth Woodville, knew that this story was false, and that this was the motivation behind Henry's decision, in February 1487, to confiscate all of her lands and possessions, and have her confined to Bermondsey Abbey, "where she died six years afterwards". However, Arlene Okerlund suggests that her retirement to the abbey was her own decision, while Michael Bennett and Timothy Elston suggest the move was precautionary, precipitated by Lambert Simnel's claim to be her son Prince Richard. Pollard calls Markham's theory "highly speculative", and states that Henry's silence over the princes was more likely "political calculation than personal guilt". Henry was also never accused of the murder by any contemporary, not even by his enemies, which he likely would have been had contemporaries thought there was any possibility of his guilt. Jeremy Potter, at the time he wrote Chairman of the Richard III Society, noted, "With Henry, as with Richard, there is no real evidence and one must suspect that if he had killed the princes himself he would quickly have produced the corpses and some ingeniously appropriate story implicating Richard." Further, Raphael Holinshed reported in 1577 that Richard "purged and declared his innocence" regarding "the murther of his nephews towards the world", indicating that the boys did indeed meet their end during Richard's days. It is also unlikely that the princes would have been kept alive in secret by Richard for two years after their last sighting while rumours of his responsibility for their murder circulated.

=== Other suspects ===
Some scholars have accused John Howard, Margaret Beaufort (Henry VII's mother), or Jane Shore (Edward IV's mistress). The Beaufort theory was supported by Philippa Gregory in a 2013 BBC documentary series The Real White Queen and her Rivals, However, it has been sustained only by speculation about a possible motive, rather than evidence. Pollard has commented regarding such theories: "None deserve serious consideration. The problem with all these accusations is that they beg the question of access to the Tower without Richard's knowledge and overlook the fact that Richard was responsible for the safekeeping of his nephews".

In the twist ending to his chamber opera Edward and Richard: The True Story of the Princes in the Tower, Alexander Voltz promoted the possibility that the princes had been murdered by their mother, Elizabeth Woodville. Voltz consulted with historian Nathen Amin, who described the Woodville theory as "unlikely, but not impossible – and, in my opinion, more believable than the survived story".

=== Survival theories ===
Historian David Baldwin suggests that Henry VII's reticence on the subject may have been because at least one of the princes was still alive; he considers that Prince Richard is more likely to have survived, with Edward V dying of a malady. Baldwin argues that it is "impossible" that no one knew what happened to the Princes after they entered the Tower; he believes Richard III and Henry VII, leading courtiers and their mother would all have known the boys' whereabouts and welfare. Baldwin argues that had this been the case, Henry VII would have had the choice of keeping quiet about the survival of Richard, or having him executed, and concluded, "He [Henry] would have been happy to let people think the boys had been murdered, but not to speculate when or by whose hand."

During the reign of Henry VII, two individuals claimed to be the princes who had somehow escaped death. Lambert Simnel initially claimed to be Prince Richard and was crowned as "King Edward VI" in Dublin, with his supporters later naming him as Edward Plantagenet, Earl of Warwick. Perkin Warbeck later claimed to be Prince Richard, appearing in Ireland and calling himself king "Richard IV". Margaret of York, Duchess of Burgundy, formally recognised Warbeck as Prince Richard. Margaret, Richard III's sister, an unrelenting opponent of Henry VII, had previously recognised Simnel as Warwick. Warbeck was also accepted as Prince Richard by James IV of Scotland. After a failed attempt to invade England he was captured. He retracted his claims, was imprisoned and later executed. Many modern historians believe he was an imposter, whose supporters accepted his claim for political reasons.

The fact that two persons claimed to be Prince Richard led the 18th-century writer Horace Walpole to argue that Richard had in fact escaped death, and that Warbeck genuinely was Richard, a view also supported by the Scottish historian Malcolm Laing. Walpole, however, later retracted his views and stated that he now believed the princes to have been murdered by Richard III to secure his hold on the crown. In more recent times the theory that Warbeck was Prince Richard has been endorsed by Annette Carson, a freelance writer with a "lifelong interest" in Richard III. She suggested that Richard smuggled the princes abroad to the custody of their aunt, the Duchess of Burgundy, and they were raised there under false identities. Baldwin suggested that by having removed them from sight to prevent them being a focus for opposition, he was then unable to bring them back to court to scotch rumours of their murder without once again having them become a threat. This theory has also been endorsed by Philippa Langley, known for the discovery of Richard III's body in 2012, who claims that contemporary documents show the two princes were alive and in contact with royals on the European continent as late as 1493, and suggests that the youths known to history as Lambert Simnel and Perkin Warbeck were genuinely the Earl of Warwick and Prince Richard, Duke of York. One of the sources is a statement (dated 1493) purported to have been written by Prince Richard, describing his escape and flight to mainland Europe, which has been independently authenticated as a late 15th-century document; another is a document claiming that Maximilian I, Holy Roman Emperor, had identified a man as Prince Richard by examining three birthmarks on his body.

==== Missing Princes Project ====
In 2021, researchers from the "Missing Princes Project" claimed to have found evidence that Edward V had lived out his days in the rural Devon village of Coldridge. They have linked the 13-year-old prince with a man named John Evans, who arrived in the village around 1484, and was immediately given an official position and the title of Lord of the Manor. Researcher John Dike noted Yorkist symbols and stained glass windows depicting Edward V in a Coldridge chapel commissioned by Evans and built around 1511, unusual for the location.

Other findings of the five-year investigation by The Missing Princes Project research initiative, suggesting the Princes' survival following the reign of Richard III (i.e. after 22 August 1485), was published in 2023 in Philippa Langley's book The Princes in the Tower: Solving History's Greatest Cold Case. New archival discoveries had been made for both sons of Edward IV. Edward V in an accounting receipt for King Maximilian I dated 16 December 1487 in the archive in Lille, France, discovered by project member, Albert Jan de Rooij. The accounting receipt confirmed that weapons (400 pikes) purchased by Maximilian on behalf of Margaret of Burgundy for the Yorkist invasion of June 1487 was on behalf of a son of Edward IV. Langley claims that some details of the receipt confirm that the son in question was Edward V.

In November 2023, these discoveries were presented as evidence in the UK on Channel 4 in an original 1 hour 45-minute "Factual Special" documentary, The Princes in the Tower. The documentary was also broadcast by SBS in Australia and PBS in the US as part of their Secrets of the Dead series. The programme followed criminal barrister Robert Rinder as he investigated new evidence from Langley's research initiative.

== Impact ==
The political reality of the disappearance of the princes, whatever happened to them, is that they were believed to have been murdered and Richard was blamed for their murders. Even if he had not been directly responsible for their deaths, the fact that he had deposed them and kept them under tight guard made him responsible for their welfare in the eyes of contemporaries, and the belief that they had been murdered made him guilty. As Baldwin noted in support of his conclusion that Richard would not have murdered the princes, "It seems incredible Richard ever supposed killing his nephews would help secure his position or make him more acceptable to his subjects." An initial uprising in September 1483, aimed at deposing Richard and restoring Edward V to the throne, was not stopped by rumours of Edward's murder. Instead, the rebels rallied around Henry Tudor as a potential alternative candidate; Horrox says Tudor was "an inconceivable choice if Edward V and his brother were thought to be still available".

Anthony Cheetham, who considered Richard likely to have had the princes murdered, commented that it was "a colossal blunder. Nothing else could have prompted the deflated Woodvilles to hitch themselves to Henry Tudor's bandwagon." The fact that the majority of the rebels were wealthy and powerful southern noblemen, loyal to Edward IV, suggests a degree of revulsion against Richard's usurpation of the throne: their willingness to fight on under an implausible alternative candidate suggests that they regarded anyone as preferable to Richard as King due to his usurpation and the murder of his nephews. Bennett suggested that perhaps those who had initially supported Richard in his seizure of power may have felt complicit in the crime, which he thought "might explain the bitterness of the subsequent recriminations against him". Hicks speculated that these men may have been "appalled by the character of the regime...shocked by Richard's crimes". Their defection severely weakened Richard, who had to impose his supporters among the northern lords as officeholders in the southern counties to maintain order, in itself a very unpopular act that further damaged his reputation. In Pollard's words, "the belief that he had murdered his nephews seriously handicapped Richard's efforts to secure himself on the throne he had usurped".

== In popular culture ==
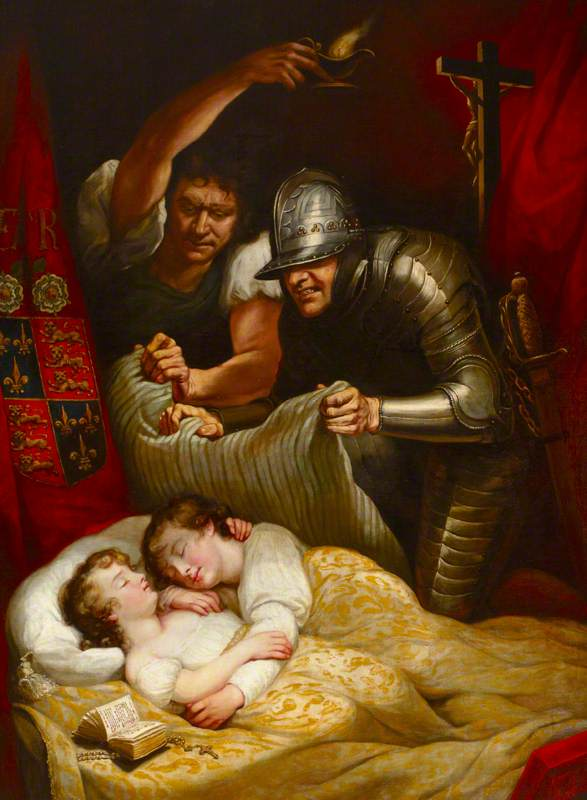
The Murder of the Princes in the Tower by James Northcote, 1786

The mystery of the Princes in the Tower has spawned best-selling novels such as Josephine Tey's The Daughter of Time and four novels in Philippa Gregory's Cousins' War series, and continues to attract the attention of historians and novelists.

=== Literature ===
==== Fiction ====
- William Shakespeare – Richard III (circa 1595)
- C. Lysah – The Little Princes in the Tower (1892)
- Josephine Tey – The Daughter of Time (1951)
- Margaret Campbell Barnes – The Tudor Rose (1953)
- Rosemary Hawley Jarman – "We Speak No Treason" (1971)
- Elizabeth Peters – The Murders of Richard III (1974)
- Sharon Kay Penman – The Sunne in Splendour (1982)
- John M. Ford – The Dragon Waiting: A Masque of History (1983)
- Valerie Anand – Crown of Roses (1989)
- Elaine M. Alphin – Tournament of Time (1994)
- Sonya Hartnett – Princes (1997)
- George R. R. Martin – A Clash of Kings (1998), where the bodies of two young boys, thought to be princes, are found hanged and burned. Martin's A Song of Ice and Fire novels are inspired in part by the Wars of the Roses.
- Elizabeth George – "I, Richard" (short story) (2002)
- Margaret Peterson Haddix
  - Found (2008)
  - Sent (2009)
- Anne Easter Smith
  - A Rose for the Crown (2008)
  - The Daughter of York (2008)
  - The King's Grace (2009)
  - Royal Mistress (2013)
- Emma Darwin – A Secret Alchemy (2009)
- Philippa Gregory
  - The White Queen (2009)
  - The Red Queen (2010)
  - The Kingmaker's Daughter (2012)
  - The White Princess (2013)
- Jason Charles – The Claws of Time (2017)
- Jodi Taylor – Plan for the Worst (2020)

==== Non-fiction ====
- Horace Walpole – Historic Doubts on the Life and Reign of Richard III (1768)
- Markham, Clements (1906). Richard III: His Life and Character.
- Audrey Williamson – The Mystery of the Princes (1978)
- Giles St. Aubyn – The Year of Three Kings, 1483 (Atheneum, 1983)
- A. J. Pollard – Richard III and the Princes in the Tower (1991)
- Alison Weir – The Princes in the Tower (1992)
- Bert Fields – Royal Blood: Richard III and the mystery of the princes (HarperCollins, 1998) (ISBN 0-06-039269-X)
- Josephine Wilkinson – The Princes in the Tower (2013)
- John Ashdown-Hill – The Mythology of the "Princes in the Tower" (2018)
- Nathen Amin – Henry VII and the Tudor Pretenders; Simnel, Warbeck and Warwick (2020)
- Philippa Langley – The Princes in the Tower: Solving History's Greatest Cold Case (The History Press, 2023)

=== Music ===
- In 2021, Edward and Richard: The True Story of the Princes in the Tower, a two-act chamber opera by the Australian composer Alexander Voltz, premiered in Brisbane. Set in 1492, the opera, the first on the princes, is told from the perspective of a dying Elizabeth Woodville and includes a twist ending. Voltz himself described the opera's music as "disturbing, chaotic and seasick", but also highlighted its “moments of tender affection and even sublimity".

=== Television ===
- The first series of the British sitcom Blackadder is set in a comic alternative history where the Princes in the Tower survived and grew to adulthood. Prince Richard, the father of main protagonist Edmund Plantagenet, assumed the throne as Richard IV following the accidental death of Richard III after a Yorkist victory at the Battle of Bosworth Field. There is no explanation of what became of Edward V. According to the show, Henry VII assumed power after the finale and erased Richard IV's reign from history, along with ruining the reputation of Richard III.
- An episode of the Canadian children's documentary series Mystery Hunters is dedicated to the unsolved case of the missing princes.
- In 1984, Channel 4 broadcast a four-hour "trial" of Richard III on the charge of murdering the princes. The presiding judge was Lord Elwyn-Jones and the barristers were recruited from the Queen's Counsel, but had to remain anonymous. Expert witnesses included David Starkey. The jury was composed of ordinary citizens. The burden of proof was left to the prosecution. The jury found in favour of the defendant.
- In 2005 Channel 4 and RDF Media produced a drama entitled Princes in the Tower about the interrogation of Perkin Warbeck, in which Warbeck almost convinces Henry VII that he really is Richard, Duke of York. The real Princes are shown by Margaret Beaufort to be still alive, but insane after many years imprisoned in chains in a cell.
- The Black Butler anime episode "His Butler, in an Isolated Castle" features the ghosts of the two young princes.
- The 2013 BBC One 10-part TV series The White Queen is an adaptation of Philippa Gregory's novels The White Queen (2009), The Red Queen (2010) and The Kingmaker's Daughter (2012).
- The 2017 Starz miniseries The White Princess is an adaptation of Philippa Gregory's novel of the same name which speculates on the fate of Prince Richard.
- In 2023, Robert Rinder and Philippa Langley presented a Channel 4 programme, The Princes in the Tower: The New Evidence.

== See also ==
- List of people who disappeared
- List of unsolved deaths
