= Giles Capel =

English landowner and courtier (died 1556)

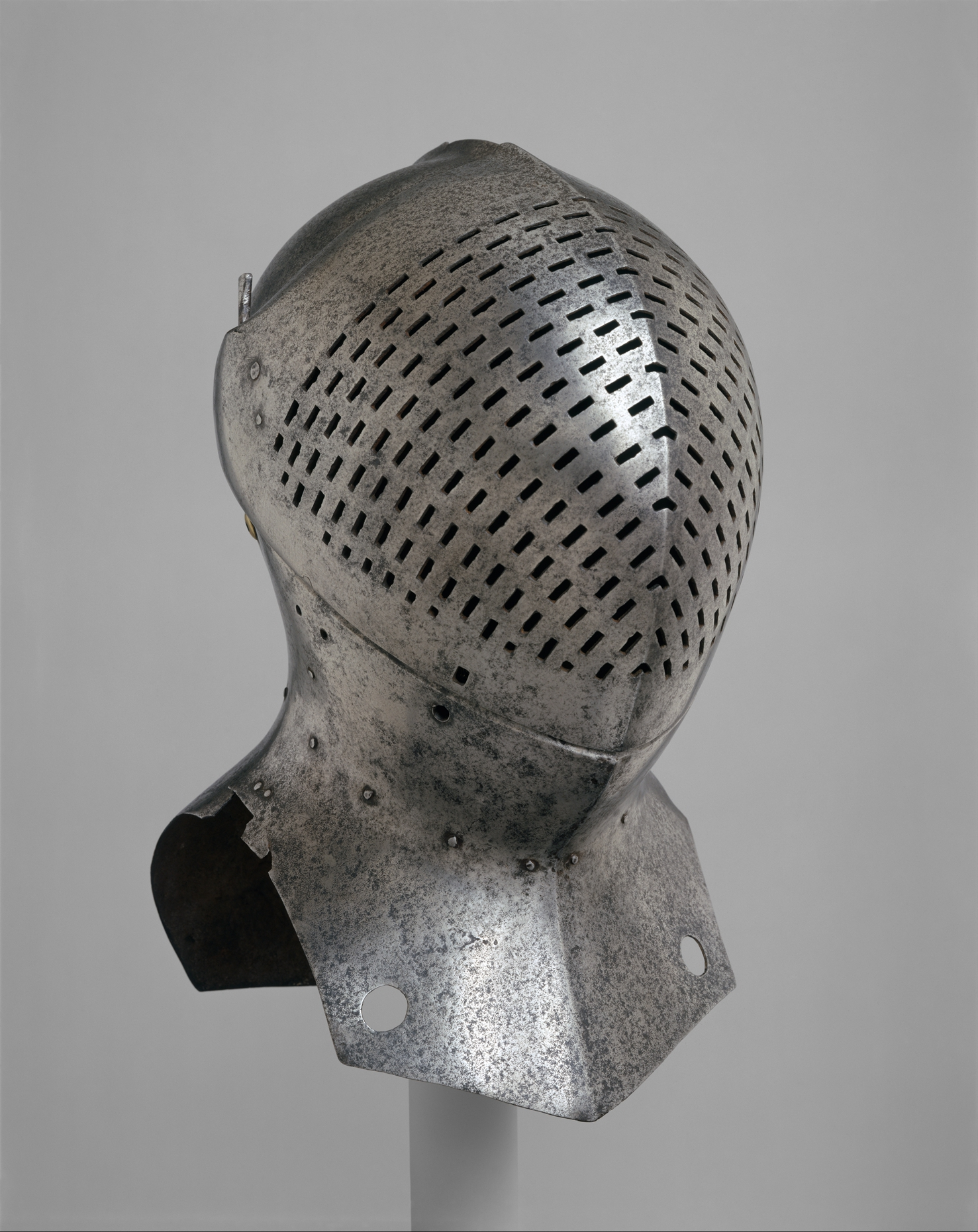
Foot-combat helm of Giles Capel, Metropolitan Museum of Art, New York

Giles Capel (died 1556) was an English landowner, soldier, and courtier, known for performing in tournaments at the Tudor court.

== Family background ==
He was a son of William Capel, a London alderman, draper, and mayor, and his wife Margaret Arundell, a daughter of Sir John Arundell. The site of their London house near Bartholomew Lane was known as Capel's Court, and later as Black Swan Yard.

Margaret Capel (died 1522) was related to Lady Margaret Beaufort via Thomas Grey. Her inscribed Latin Bible survives in the Bodleian Library in Oxford. Her will included a bequest of a manuscript prayer book and a printed missal for the altar of the family chantry chapel at St Bartholomew-the-Less.

William Capel was involved in crown finance. As mayor of London, he had some dealing with two officers of Henry VII, Richard Empson and Edmund Dudley, and was censured in a legal court in 1504. He had to pay for pardons for himself and his son Giles Capel. William Capel was imprisoned in 1507 for not acting against the circulation of counterfeit money, by a jury said to have been influenced by Dudley and Empson.

== Career ==
An entry in the patent rolls describes Giles Capel as an esquire to the body of Henry VII. He was educated in the household of Henry Bourchier, 2nd Earl of Essex. Giles Capel became a noted participant in tournaments from May 1507 onwards, and attended Henry VIII at the Field of the Cloth of Gold. The Metropolitan Museum in New York has one of his helmets, which was displayed for many years above his monument at Rayne.

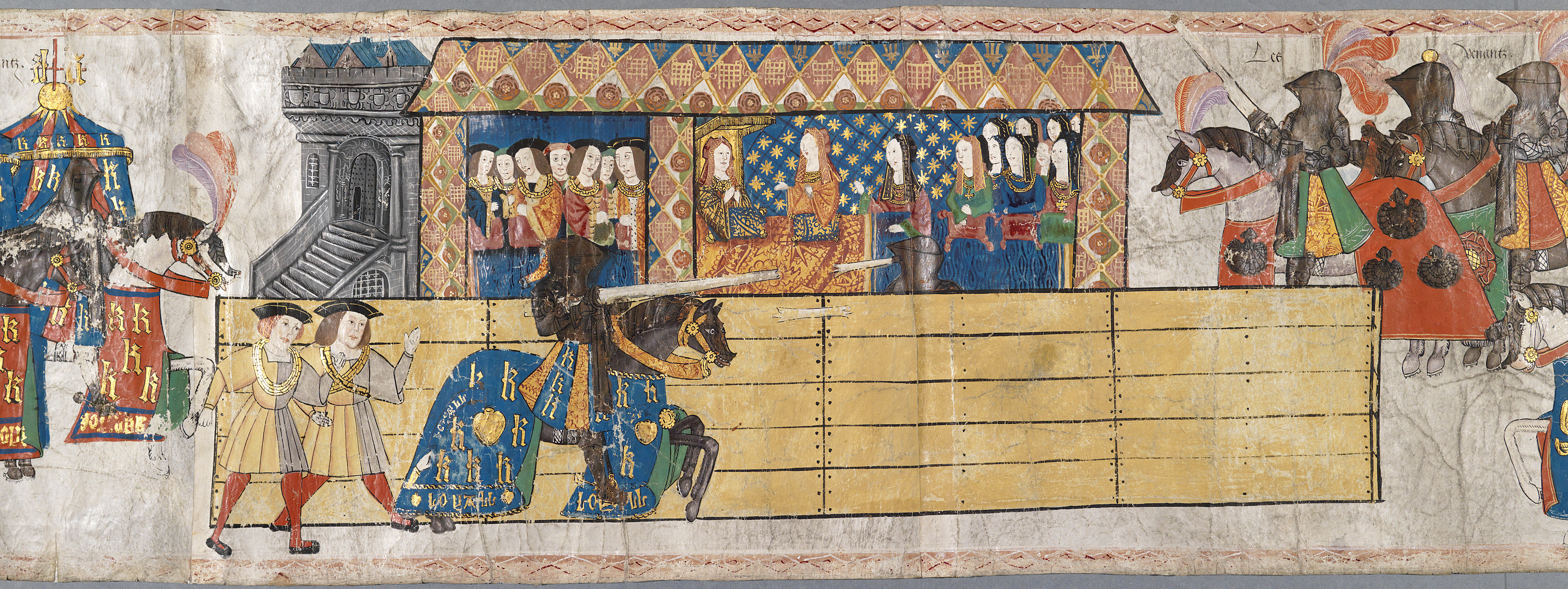
Giles Capel performed at the tournaments of Henry VIII and Catherine of Aragon

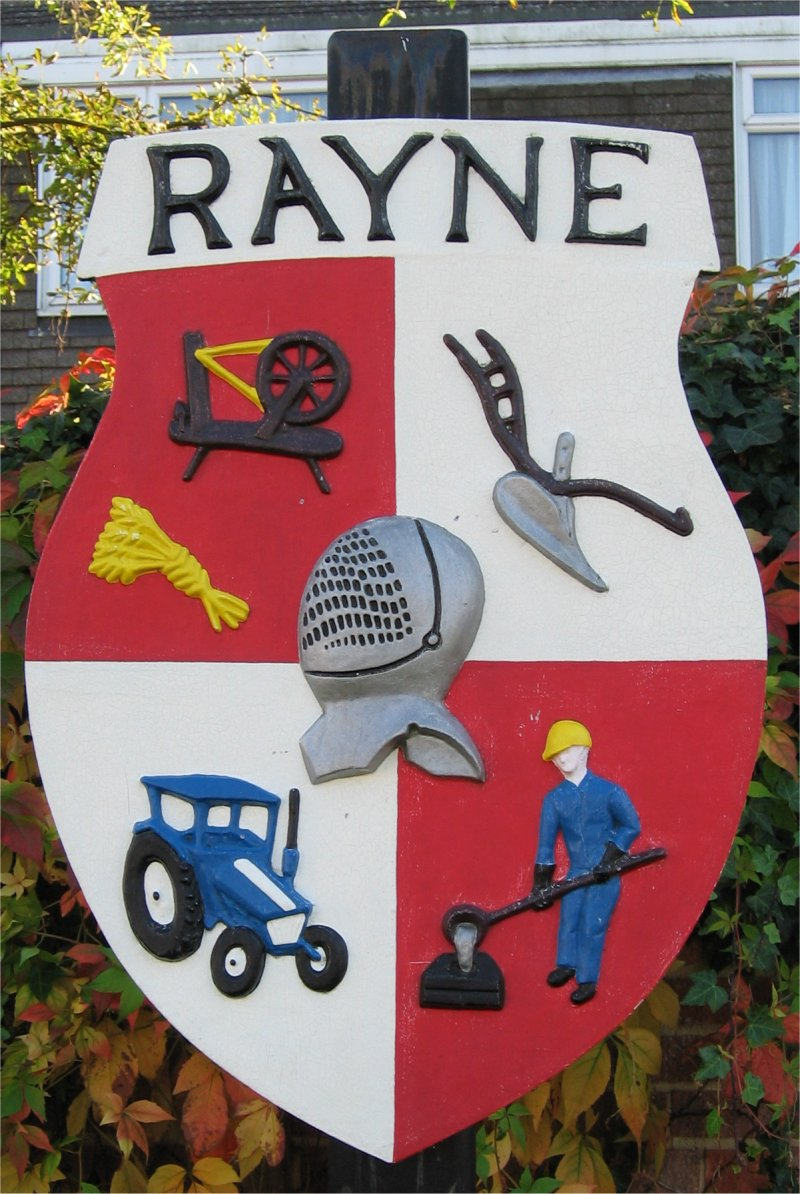
Commemorative shield at Rayne village in Essex

His jousting was commemorated in a poem printed by Wynkyn de Worde, The justes of the moneth of Maye, parfurnyssed and done by Charles Brandon, Thomas Knyuet, Gyles Capel, and Wyllyam Hussy, the XXII yere of Kynge Henry the Seventh. Their emblem was a "verte cocle", a green scallop shell:

Thus these foure seruauntes of this lady foresayd
Entred the felde, there for to be assayde
Gorgyously apparayled and arayde
And for pleasaunce

And in a maner for a cognysaunce
Of Mayes month they bare a souenaunce
Of a verte cocle was the resemblaunce
Tatched ryght fast

About theyr neckes as longe as May dyde laste
But about theyr neckes it was not caste
For challenge, but they weere it tyll May was past
Redy to Iust

One unsuccessful performance was recorded in a chronicle, Henry VIII "commanded master Gyles Capel to run, howbeit his horse that day did him not most pleasant service." In May 1516, Capel jousted at Greenwich Palace at an entertainment held for Margaret Tudor. He was a "defender", dressed in white satin traversed with cloth of gold.

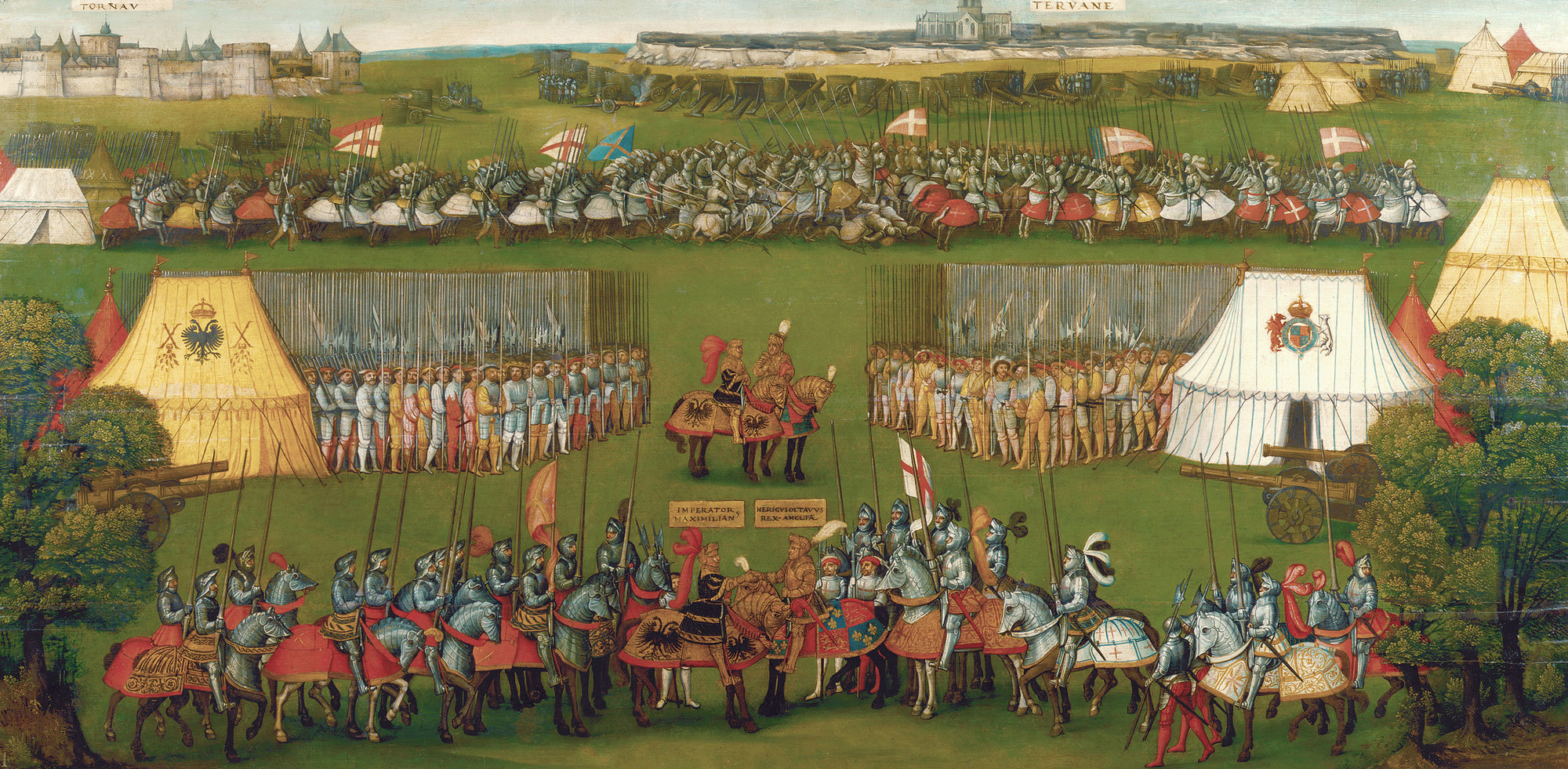
Painting of the Battle of the Spurs, RCT

Capel was knighted in 1513 at Thérouanne after the Battle of the Spurs. He was the commander of two ships during the campaign, the Mary George of Hull and the Anthony of Lynne. Chronicle accounts say that Capel took part in the chase or pursuit of French soldiers at the end of the battle, and exchanged comments in French with a prisoner about their brags or bravado.

Capel was often in debt and sometimes in trouble. His 1512 marriage settlement lists some of his creditors, including the goldsmith Nicholas Worley or Warley, and his mother made arrangements to help. Warley, a churchwarden of St Mary Woolnoth, and Robert Amadas had supplied jewels and gilt plate to Henry VII for New Year's Day gifts and he has been suggested as the maker of a gilt cup with the badges of Henry VIII and Catherine of Aragon now in Florence. Some years later, John Selake complained to Cardinal Wolsey that Capel, or his men, had attacked him near Westminster Abbey.

=== Later life ===
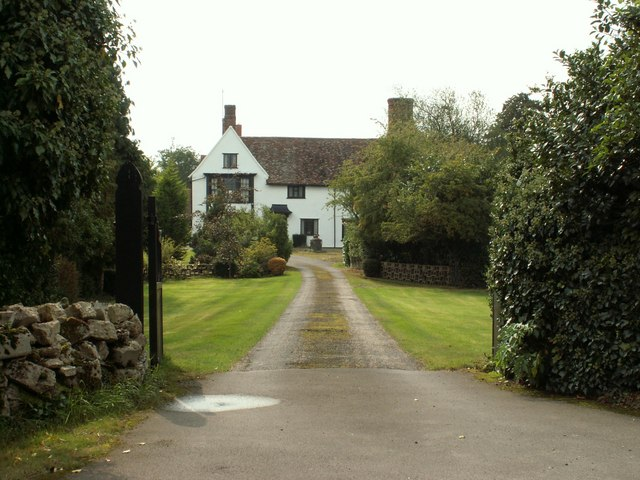
Porter's Hall at Stebbing in north Essex that belonged to Giles Capel

Capel attended the Field of the Cloth of Gold in 1520 and returned to Calais in 1532. Entries in the privy purse accounts show that Capel brought gifts of food to Henry VIII, including cheese, partridges, and pheasants. Capel and his son Henry visited Princess Mary at Newhall in 1533. In October 1534 or 1535, Capel lent his London house to Henry VIII for the use of Emperor's ambassadors. He wrote from Rayne agreeing to Henry's request, saying that previously he had refused to let the house to the Queen Dowager Catherine of Aragon, and asked only to reserve a "warehouse" in the building for his family papers.

Capel attended the baptism of Prince Edward in 1537. Richard Taverner was a guest at Rayne in August 1537 when there was plague in London. Capel was a groom of the privy chamber at the reception of Anne of Cleves in 1539. A letter was sent to Capel by the supporters of Mary I, during the 1553 succession crisis, concerning ships at Harwich.

== Death ==
Giles Capel died on 29 May 1556 and was buried at Rayne. His will mentions that he should be buried next to his wife Mary Denys at Rayne, his tomb built in brick, and his sword placed above his funeral achievements. He asked that the tomb be suitable for use as an Easter sepulchre. His parents and his son Henry were buried in London at the family chantry at St Bartholomew-the-Less. Henry Machyn's diary mentions Giles Capel's funeral. Some older sources state that Giles Capel was buried in the chantry at "St Bartolomew Exchange".

== Stained glass from Rayne ==
According to Nicolas Tindal and Philip Morant, historians of the county of Essex, there was heraldic stained glass in the windows over the parlour at Rayne Hall and on the great staircase a panel dated 1553 with the heraldry of Giles Capel. A heraldic panel of this description, formerly in the Ronaele Manor collection, is now held by the Philadelphia Museum of Art. Giles Capel also had a house at Little Hadham and Porter's Hall at Stebbing.

== Royal chain ==
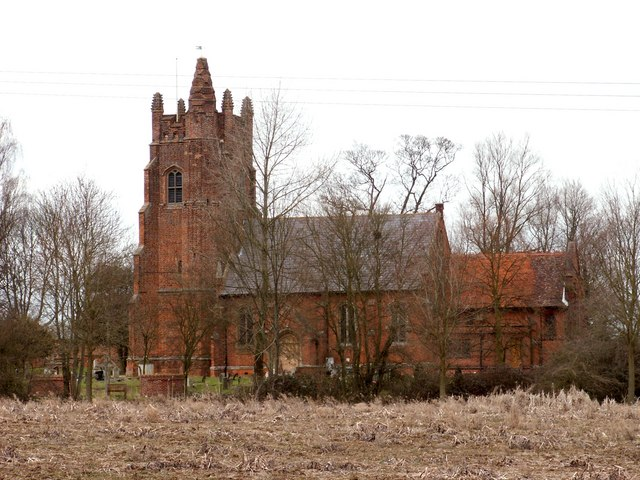
Giles Capel's sword and helm were kept at All Saint's Rayne until the church was rebuilt in 1840.

By her 1516 will, his mother Margaret bequeathed him a gold chain of his late father's, which had belonged to Edward V, one of the Princes in the Tower. The bequest was intended to entail the chain and a bed with embroidered curtains and other items in the Capel family:

"his faders cheyne which was younge kyng Edwarde the Vth's. To have the forsaid stuffe and cheyne during his life with reasonable werying upon that condicion that after his decease I will that yt remain and be kept by myn executors to the use of Henry Capell and Edward Capell from one to another".

Elizabeth of York, the older sister of the Princes in the Tower, had borrowed £100 from William Capel in 1502. Margaret Capel's older step-sister Anne was the wife of James Tyrrell, who is thought to have been involved in the deaths of the Princes in the Tower.

== Marriages and children ==
Giles Capel married firstly, Isobel Newton (died 1511), a daughter of Richard Newton (d. 1501) and his wife Elizabeth (d. 1524), widow of John St John (a son of Margaret Beauchamp of Bletso). Isobel was a granddaughter of John Newton alias Craddock (d. 1488) of Yatton and Isobel Cheddar (d. 1498), and a great granddaughter of Sir Richard Newton. Some older sources incorrectly suggest she was Capel's second wife. Isobel Newton brought the manors of Ubley and Butcombe into the Capell family. She was certainly the mother of Henry Capell. Her sister Joan married Thomas Griffin of Braybrooke.

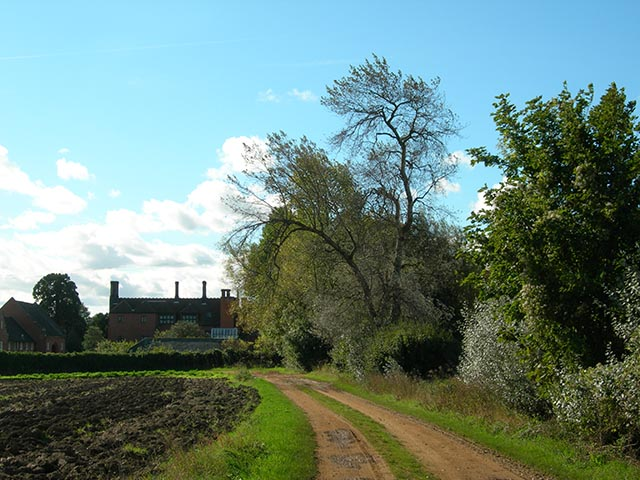
Henry Capell rebuilt Hadham Hall and hosted Elizabeth I in 1578.

He married secondly, Marie or Mary Roos, a gentlewoman at court, and widow of the groom of the stool, Hugh Denys. She was a granddaughter of Thomas Ros, 8th Baron Ros of Helmsley Castle. One of her books, Walter Hilton's Scale of Perfection, was a gift from Elizabeth of York and Lady Margaret Beaufort. The book, in which she signed her name "Dame Capill", survives at the Yale Center for British Art. Lady Margaret Beaufort had commissioned the print run from Wynkyn de Worde.

Dame Mary Capel wrote to Thomas Cromwell in October 1535, offering him £20 for a horse if he would secure her overdue payments from an annuity she received from the exchequer. The income had been a gift to her by Henry VII and was allocated from the manors of Cookham and Bray, which were in the dower of Catherine of Aragon. Capel offered to show the patent for his wife's annuity to the Queen's Council in January 1536, hoping that Cromwell could reframe the grant best to his wife's advantage.

His children included:

- Henry Capell (1505–1558), MP, of Little Hadham and of Rayne in Essex.
- Edward Capell, who married Anne Peckham or Pelken, and was the father of Henry Capell (MP for Hertfordshire) and Mary Browne of South Weald.
- Margaret (or Alice) Capel, who married Robert Warde of Brooke or Kirby Bedon in Norfolk. Their children included Henry Ward.
