= Henry Capell =

Henry Capell may refer to:

- Henry Capell (MP for Boston) (died 1622), MP for Boston
- Henry Capell (MP for Hertfordshire) (died 1588), MP for Hertfordshire
- Henry Capell, Baron Capell of Tewkesbury (1638–1696), MP for Tewkesbury, and for Cockermouth
- Henry Capell (died 1558) (1505–1558), MP for Somerset
