= Richard Croshawe =

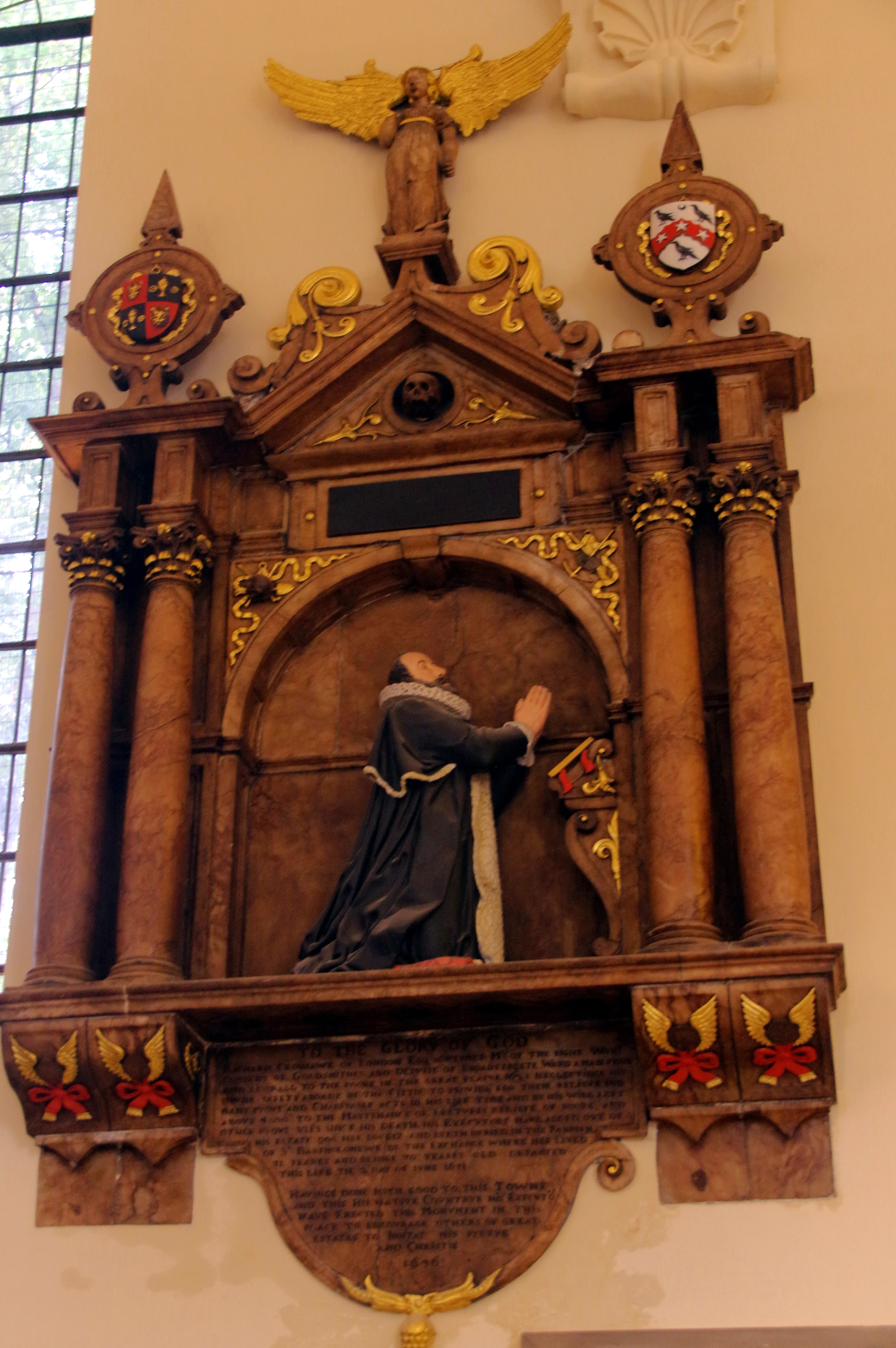
Mural monument to Richard Croshawe, Derby Cathedral, displaying the arms of the Worshipful Company of Goldsmiths

Richard Croshawe (1561-2 June 1631) of the parish of St Bartholomew-by-the-Exchange in the City of London was a wealthy goldsmith who served as Master of the Worshipful Company of Goldsmiths. He was a generous benefactor to charity and "a liberal and public-spirited parishioner". His mural monument survives in All Saints Church, Derby (now Derby Cathedral), in Derbyshire.

== Origins ==
He was the son of a smith from Markeaton, in the parish of Mackworth, near Derby.

== Career ==
He served as Master of the Worshipful Company of Goldsmiths and as "Deputy" of Broad-Street Ward, as the inscription on his monument states.

== Benefactions ==
He rebuilt the vestry-house of the Church of St Bartholomew-by-the-Exchange and in 1613 presented the church with a magnificent green velvet suit of hangings, and cushion for the pulpit, which was fringed, and ornamented with gold and silver embroidery and fringe, including the letters IHS, which later in 1643 were removed, having been deemed "popish letters". He paid for a screen at the west end of the church.

== Monument in Derby Cathedral ==
His mural monument in All Saints' Church, Derby (now Derby Cathedral), comprises a sculpted effigy of a man in a gown and ruff kneeling before a desk with his hands elevated, above his head a canopy. Two shields of arms ars shown above, that on the dexter the arms of the Worshipful Company of Goldsmiths The shield at sinister dexter displays Argent, on a chevron engrailed gules between three Cornish choughs as many mullets of the first a crescent for difference. Below is the following inscription:

"To the glory of God. Richard Croshawe, of London, esq. sometyme Mr. of the Right Worshipful Companie of Goldsmiths and Deputie of Broad-Streete Ward, a man pious, and liberall to the poor, in the great plague 1625, neglecting his owne safetie aboade in the citie to provide for theire reliefe, did many pyous and charitable acts in his lifetime, and by his will left above £4000 to the mayntenance of lectures, reliefe of poore, and other pyous uses. Since his death his executors have added out of his estate £900. Hee dwelte and lyeth buried in the parrish of St. Bartholomew, by the Exchange, wheare he lived 31 years, and beinge 70 years old, departed this life the 2nd day of June, 1631. Having done much good to this towne and this his native countrie, his executors have erected this monument in this place to encourage others of great estates to imitate his pyetie and charitie, 1636"

== Sources ==
- John Stow, A Survey of the Cities of London and Westminster, Borough of Southwark,, Vol.1, London, 1733, p. 251
- Dugdale, Sir William, Visitation of Derbyshire
