= Guillaume de Rochefort =

Lord Chancellor of France under kings Louis XI and Charles VIII (1433/39–1492)

Guillaume de Rochefort (c.1433 [or 1439] – 12 August 1492) was a lawyer who served as Lord Chancellor of France, under the French kings Louis XI and Charles VIII.

Guillaume is thought to have been born at Pluvault or Rochefort-sur-Nenon (Jura), and was the son of Jacques II and his wife Agnès de Cléron. He was also the elder brother of Guy de Rochefort, another Chancellor of France. He began his career in the service of the dukes of Burgundy Philip the Good and Charles the Bold, first as a counsellor and later as chamberlain of Burgundy.

Guillaume's first wife was Guye de Vurry ou Wourey, dame de Fouchereau; she gave birth to four children, and died in 1487. After her death, Guillaume married Anne de la Trémoille.

In January 1484, Rochefort made a statement to the Estates-General, to the effect that King Richard III of England had murdered his nephew, King Edward V, and taken the crown for himself. It is assumed that he obtained this information from Dominic Mancini, who is thought to have been in personal contact with him the previous month.
