= John Argentine =

15th and 16th century English physician

John Argentine (died 1507) was an English physician who attended Edward V of England and later Arthur, Prince of Wales, and was Provost of King's College, Cambridge.

== Life ==
He was the son of John d'Argentine, of Great Wymondley in Hertfordshire. The Argentines had been settled in Cambridgeshire since the Norman Conquest of England. He was educated at Eton and King's College, Cambridge.

Argentine was the last known attendant of the Princes in the Tower; he noted that Edward took daily confession and penance, believing that his death was near. (Note: The original Latin wording "Argentinus medicus" has been alternatively translated as "a Strasbourg doctor", Argentoratum being the Latin name for Strasbourg, but more likely refers to Argentine. The suggestion that Argentine himself was a Strasbourg doctor is a misidentification, and Anthony Allen connected the Argentine family name to an unrelated location in Normandy.) Argentine's evidence was also the basis for French declarations that the Princes in the Tower of London had been murdered and their assassin crowned as King Richard III.

Later, he became physician to Prince Arthur. He ended his life as Provost of King's College, Cambridge and is buried there in the Chantry Chapel.

== In popular culture ==
Argentine is a major character in the Channel 4 drama The Princes in the Tower in which he interrogates Perkin Warbeck to test the veracity of his claim to being Richard of Shrewsbury, 1st Duke of York. He is portrayed in the show by John Castle.

== Notes ==
Academic offices
Preceded by John Dogget	Provost of King's College, Cambridge; 1501–1507	Succeeded by Richard Hatton
