= Little Hadham =

Village in Hertfordshire, England

Coordinates: 51.8844°N 0.09046°E

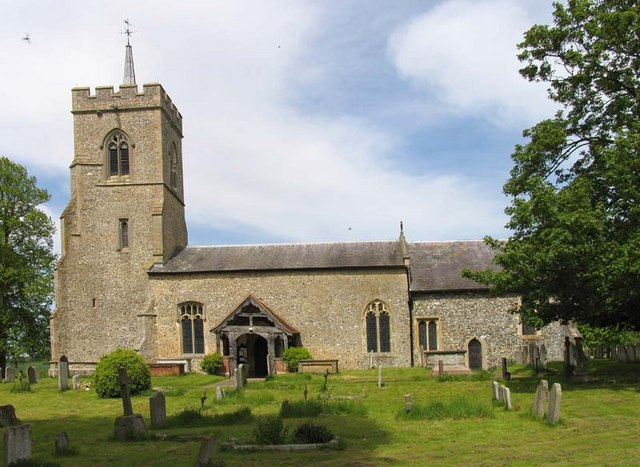
- St Cecilia's Parish Church, Little Hadham

- Location within Hertfordshire
- Population: 1,194 (Parish, 2021)
- OS grid reference: TL439227
- Civil parish: Little Hadham
- District: East Hertfordshire
- Shire county: Hertfordshire
- Region: East
- Country: England
- Sovereign state: United Kingdom
- Post town: WARE
- Postcode district: SG11
- Dialling code: 01279
- Police: Hertfordshire
- Fire: Hertfordshire
- Ambulance: East of England
- UK Parliament: Hertford and Stortford

Little Hadham is a village and civil parish in the East Hertfordshire district of Hertfordshire, England. The village lies 7 miles (11 km) north-east of Ware, its post town, and 5 miles (8 km) west of Bishop's Stortford. As well as the village itself, the parish covers surrounding rural areas, including the hamlets of Bury Green, Church End, Cradle End, Green Street, and Hadham Ford. At the 2021 census the parish had a population of 1,194.

The village lies in the valley of the River Ash. It is centred on a crossroads on the Roman road known as Stane Street. This part of Stane Street served as the A120 road until a bypass to the north of the village was completed in 2021. The village has a number of timber-framed houses. The medieval parish church, dedicated to Saint Cecilia, was rebuilt in the late 14th century or 15th century, and stands on a hillside to the east of the village.

== History ==
Little Hadham and neighbouring Much Hadham to the south are collectively known as The Hadhams. The Hadhams appear to have comprised a single territory in Saxon times, which may also have included Albury and the three Pelhams of Brent Pelham, Furneux Pelham, and Stocking Pelham to the north. The earliest known recording of the name Hadham dates from a charter of the 950s. The name comes from heath ham, meaning the estate on the heath.

The Hadham area became the two parishes of Little Hadham and Much Hadham. Little Hadham's parish church, dedicated to St Cecilia, was largely rebuilt in the 14th century, although retains some evidence of an earlier 12th-century building. When the church was built, Little Hadham was a hilltop village adjoining the church. The earlier settlement was subsequently largely abandoned, leaving just the church and a couple of adjoining houses on the hilltop. The main focus for the village came to be around the crossroads at the bottom of the hill to the west, around a bridge over the River Ash.

By the early 21st century, the A120 through Little Hadham was known as a significant traffic bottleneck. An A120 bypass to the north of the village was therefore built, opening in 2021.

== Hadham Hall ==
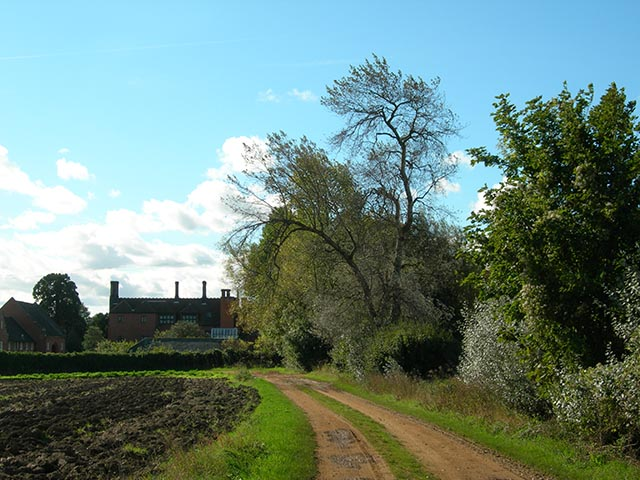
Hadham Hall, ancient seat of the Capells and the Earls of Essex

Hadham Hall, an ancient manor house situated 0.8 miles (1.3 km) south-east of the village on the Stortford Road, was the family seat of the Capell (or Capel) family, also Rayne Hall in Rayne, Essex. It was bought by Sir William Capel, who served twice as Lord Mayor of London, in 1503-4 and 1510. The family seat remained at Rayne, until the 1570s, when Sir Henry Capell built a new house at Little Hadham, replacing the old hall. In 1578, Sir Henry Capell welcomed Queen Elizabeth I of England as a guest at Hadham Hall; an account of the time records her visit to "Mayster Kapel's, where was excellente good cheere and entertaynement." Arthur Capell (1608–1649) was a noted member of Parliament who was raised to the Peerage as Baron Capell of Hadham in 1641. In 1627, Arthur Capell married Elizabeth Morrison, daughter of Sir Charles Morrison, and heir to the Cassiobury Estate in Watford, and the Capell family became closely associated with Cassiobury. Capell supported the Royalist cause in the English Civil War, and was condemned to death by the Parliamentarians, beheaded in May 1649. One of Capell's last requests was for his heart to be buried with the body of King Charles I of England, and after his execution, Capell's heart was preserved in a silver box.

In 1661, after the Restoration, Arthur Capell's son, also called Arthur Capell, became the first Earl of Essex. The new Earl commissioned a lavish reconstruction of his father's Tudor mansion, Cassiobury House, around 1677–1680, and he moved the family seat to Cassiobury. Meanwhile, the silver box containing the late Arthur Capell's heart, had remained in the safekeeping of the Bishop of Winchester, and the Bishop presented it to the new king, Charles II of England. In 1703, a heart in a silver box was found at Hadham Hall, suggesting that the King sent the heart to Capell's son. It was later taken to Cassiobury, but since the dissolution and sale of the Cassiobury estate, the whereabouts of Capell's heart are now unknown. A memorial stone to Lord Capell is in St Cecilia's Church in Little Hadham.

After the move to Watford, Hadham Hall fell into disrepair and was partly demolished, although it was retained by the Capell family, and the estate continued to be farmed by tenant farmers. The Capells used the hall to entertain important guests, such as King William III of England, who visited in April 1698. The hall was refurbished, around 1720, in the Queen Anne style. In 1900, Algernon George de Vere Capel, the 8th Earl of Essex (1884–1966), sold the Hall and the accompanying land to a London merchant, William Minet, who set about restoring the hall. In 1948, Hadham Hall was sold to the Hertfordshire County Council, who converted the building into a school. The school closed in 1990, and merged with the Margaret Dane school to form Birchwood High School in Bishop’s Stortford. Hadham Hall, now a private residence, is a Grade II* listed building.

== The Angel ==
One of its notable features is "The Angel", a former pub once inhabited by the folk rock group Fairport Convention and after which their album Angel Delight was titled. Violinist Dave Swarbrick, guitarists Richard Thompson and Simon Nicol, bassist Dave Pegg, and drummer Dave Mattacks were resident in the building, along with their wives and the band's road crew. Members of the band supported the local community by playing at charity concerts to raise money for the church organ or the Police Orphans Fund. Nick Drake also visited the premises when making his first albums (Dave Pegg and Dave Mattacks of Fairport Convention played bass and drums respectively on these). The band's residence there ended in February 1971 when a lorry crashed into the Angel, severely damaging the property and destroying Swarbrick's bedroom. The lorry driver was killed in the accident, but nobody else was hurt. In 2014 The Angel was purchased by William Christopher Jones and Emily Waller Nunes, the latter an American coincidentally from Fairport, New York.

== See also ==
- The Hundred Parishes
