= William Capel =

16th-century English politician

Arms of Capell: Gules, a lion rampant between three cross-crosslets fitchée or

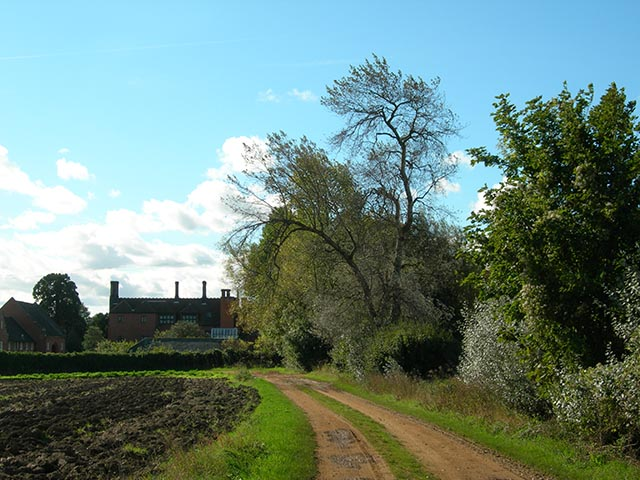
Hadham Hall in the parish of Little Hadham, Hertfordshire, purchased by Sir William Capel

Sir William Capel (c. 1446-1515) of Capel Court in the parish of St Bartholomew-by-the-Exchange in the City of London and of Hadham Hall in the parish of Little Hadham, Hertfordshire, served as Lord Mayor of London and as a Member of Parliament for the City of London.

== Origins ==
He was the son of John Capell (1398–1449) of Stoke-by-Nayland in Suffolk, a member of the Suffolk gentry, whose family had been seated at Capel St. Mary in Suffolk since the 12th century.

== Career ==
William Capel was a member of the Worshipful Company of Drapers, who served as Sheriff of the City of London for 1496, and was twice elected Lord Mayor of London, in 1503 and 1510. He was elected as a Member of Parliament for the City of London from 1511 to 1515.

His London mansion stood in the vicinity of the present London Stock Exchange and of Capel Court (named after him, now a short sidestreet or walkway) in the City of London. He added a south chapel to his parish church of St Bartholomew-by-the-Exchange in the City. He purchased the estate of Hadham Hall in the parish of Little Hadham, Hertfordshire, which remained in the Capell family from many generations. A new house was later built there, whether on the site of the old hall or on a new site is uncertain, which became the seat of his Capell descendants from the 1570s onwards.

Capel loaned money on the security of jewellery. In April 1489, he lent money to a goldsmith Symond Garardson on the security of a group of diamond and ruby rings. Capel lent £100 to Elizabeth of York in 1502. As mayor of London, he had some dealings with two officers of Henry VII, Richard Empson and Edmund Dudley. Capel was fined for a perceived lapse in regulating customs in 1495, and his penalty was mitigated by the intercession of the courtier and Lord Chamberlain, Giles Daubeney, 1st Baron Daubeney. Capel was censured again in a legal court in 1504, he had to pay for pardons for himself and his son Giles Capel. In 1507, William Capel was imprisoned for not acting against the circulation of counterfeit money, by a jury said to have been influenced by Dudley and Empson.

== Marriage and issue ==
Canting arms of Arundell: Sable, six martlets argent (hirondelle (French), martlet)

He married Margaret Arundell, a daughter of Sir John Arundell (1421–1473) of Lanherne in Cornwall, by his second wife Katherine Chideocke, by whom he had issue including a son and two daughters:

- Elizabeth Capell (abt 1480-1558), the first wife of William Paulet, 1st Marquess of Winchester.
- Giles Capel of Rayne (abt 1485-1556), son and heir, an esquire to the body of Henry VII. Giles Capell married Isobel Newton, and secondly, Mary Roos, widow of Hugh Denys, and a servant to both Elizabeth of York and Catherine of Aragon. His descendants included: Sir Gamaliel Capell (1561-1613), MP, of Rookwood Hall, Abbess Roding, Essex, 4th son of Henry Capell (d.1588), MP, by his wife Katherine Manners, a daughter of Thomas Manners, 1st Earl of Rutland; Arthur Capell, 1st Baron Capell of Hadham (1604–1649), only son of Sir Henry Capell of Rayne Hall in Essex by his wife Theodosia Montagu, a daughter of Sir Edward Montagu of Boughton House, Northamptonshire; Arthur Capell, 1st Earl of Essex (1631–1683), son of 1st Baron Capell, created Earl of Essex in 1661.
- Dorothy Capel, the wife of John La Zouche, 8th Lord Zouche.

=== Will of Margaret Capel ===
Margaret Capel made her will in 1516 and died in 1522. She made a number of bequests of rich fabrics to churches, some of which she had embroidered herself, especially for the family's chantry chapel at St Bartholomew-the-Less. She also bequeathed a chain of her late husband's, which had belonged to the "yonge kyng" Edward V, to her son Sir Giles Capel. Giles was also given a best bed with curtains embroidered with the badge of an anchor and the motto used by his father. The anchor badge was carved in the doorways at Rayne Hall.

Civic offices
Preceded by Bartholomew Reade	Lord Mayor of London; 1503-1504	Succeeded by John Wyngar
Preceded by Thomas Bradbury	Lord Mayor of London; 1510	Succeeded by Henry Keble
