= Edward V =

King of England in 1483

- Edward, then Prince of Wales, from a window at Canterbury Cathedral, c. 1482-1483

King of England
- Reign: 9 April 1483 – 25 June 1483
- Predecessor: Edward IV
- Successor: Richard III
- Lord Protector: Richard, Duke of Gloucester
- Born: 2 November 1470; Westminster, England
- Disappeared: July 1483 (aged 12); Tower of London, London, England
- House: York
- Father: Edward IV of England
- Mother: Elizabeth Woodville

Edward V (2 November 1470 – presumably July 1483) was King of England from 9 April to 25 June 1483. He succeeded his father, Edward IV, upon the latter's death. Edward V was never crowned, and his brief reign was dominated by the influence of his uncle and Lord Protector, the Duke of Gloucester, who deposed him to reign as King Richard III. This was confirmed by the Titulus Regius, an act of Parliament that denounced any further claims through Edward IV's heirs by delegitimising Edward V and all of his siblings. The act was later repealed by parliament under Henry VII, who married Elizabeth of York, Edward V's eldest sister.

Edward V and his younger brother, Richard of Shrewsbury, are known as the Princes in the Tower. They disappeared after being sent to heavily guarded royal lodgings in the Tower of London. Responsibility for their disappearance, and presumed deaths, is widely attributed to Richard III, who sent them to the Tower, but the lack of conclusive evidence and conflicting contemporary accounts allow for other possibilities.

== Early life and Prince of Wales ==
Edward was born on 2 November 1470 at Cheyneygates, the medieval house of the Abbot of Westminster adjoining Westminster Abbey. His mother, Elizabeth Woodville, had sought sanctuary there from Lancastrian supporters who had deposed his father, the Yorkist king Edward IV, during the Wars of the Roses. Edward was created Prince of Wales in June 1471, following his father's restoration to the throne, and in 1473 was established at Ludlow Castle on the Welsh Marches as nominal president of the newly created Council of Wales and the Marches. In 1479, his father conferred the earldom of Pembroke on him; it merged into the crown on his succession.

Prince Edward was placed under the supervision of the queen's brother, Anthony Woodville, 2nd Earl Rivers, a noted scholar. In a letter to Rivers, Edward IV set out precise conditions for his son's upbringing and the management of the prince's household. Edward was to "arise every morning at a convenient hour, according to his age". His day began with matins and then Mass, which he was to receive without interruption. After breakfast, his education commenced with "virtuous learning". Dinner was served from ten in the morning, after which he was to be read "noble stories ... of virtue, honour, cunning, wisdom, and of deeds of worship" but "of nothing that should move or stir him to vice". The king, perhaps mindful of his own vices, instructed Rivers to ensure that no one in the prince's household was a habitual "swearer, brawler, backbiter, common hazarder, adulterer, [or user of] words of ribaldry". After further study, in the afternoon the prince was to take part in sporting activities suitable for his rank before evensong. Supper was served from four, and curtains were drawn at eight. After this, his attendants were to "enforce themselves to make him merry and joyous towards his bed". They then watched over him as he slept.

Dominic Mancini wrote of the young Edward V:

In word and deed he gave so many proofs of his liberal education, of polite nay rather scholarly, attainments far beyond his age; ... his special knowledge of literature ... enabled him to discourse elegantly, to understand fully, and to declaim most excellently from any work whether in verse or prose that came into his hands, unless it were from the more abstruse authors. He had such dignity in his whole person, and in his face such charm, that however much they might gaze, he never wearied the eyes of beholders.

As with several of his other children, Edward IV planned a prestigious European marriage for his eldest son. In 1480, he concluded an alliance with Francis II, Duke of Brittany, whereby Prince Edward was betrothed to the duke's four-year-old daughter and heiress, Anne. The pair were to marry upon reaching majority, with their eldest son inheriting England, and their second son Brittany.

== Reign ==
It was at Ludlow that the 12-year-old Edward received the news, on Monday 14 April 1483, of his father's sudden death five days before. Edward IV's will, which has not survived, nominated his trusted brother Richard, Duke of Gloucester, as Protector during the minority of his son. The new king left Ludlow on 24 April. Richard left York a day earlier, planning to meet him at Northampton and travel to London together. When Richard reached Northampton, however, Edward and his party had already travelled onward to Stony Stratford, Buckinghamshire. The Earl Rivers travelled back to Northampton to meet Richard and Buckingham, who had now arrived. On the night of 29 April, Richard dined with Rivers and Edward's half-brother, Richard Grey, but the following morning Rivers, Grey, and the king's chamberlain, Thomas Vaughan, were arrested and sent north. Despite Richard's assurances, all three were subsequently executed. Dominic Mancini, an Italian who visited England in the 1480s, reports that Edward protested, but the remainder of his entourage was dismissed and Richard escorted him to London. On 19 May 1483, the new king took up residence in the Tower of London; on 16 June, his younger brother Richard of Shrewsbury, Duke of York joined him there.

The Privy Council had at first hoped for a speedy coronation, to avoid the need for a protectorate. This had previously happened with Richard II, who had become king at the age of ten. Another precedent was Henry VI, whose protectorate, which began when he inherited the crown aged nine months, had ended with his coronation aged seven. Richard, however, repeatedly postponed the coronation.

On 22 June, Ralph Shaa preached a sermon declaring that Edward IV had already been contracted to marry Lady Eleanor Butler when he married Elizabeth Woodville, thereby rendering his marriage to Elizabeth invalid and their children together illegitimate. The children of Richard's older brother George, Duke of Clarence, were barred from the throne by their father's attainder. On 25 June, an assembly of Lords and Commons declared Richard to be the lawful king. This was later confirmed by the act of parliament Titulus Regius. The following day he acceded to the throne as King Richard III.

== Disappearance ==
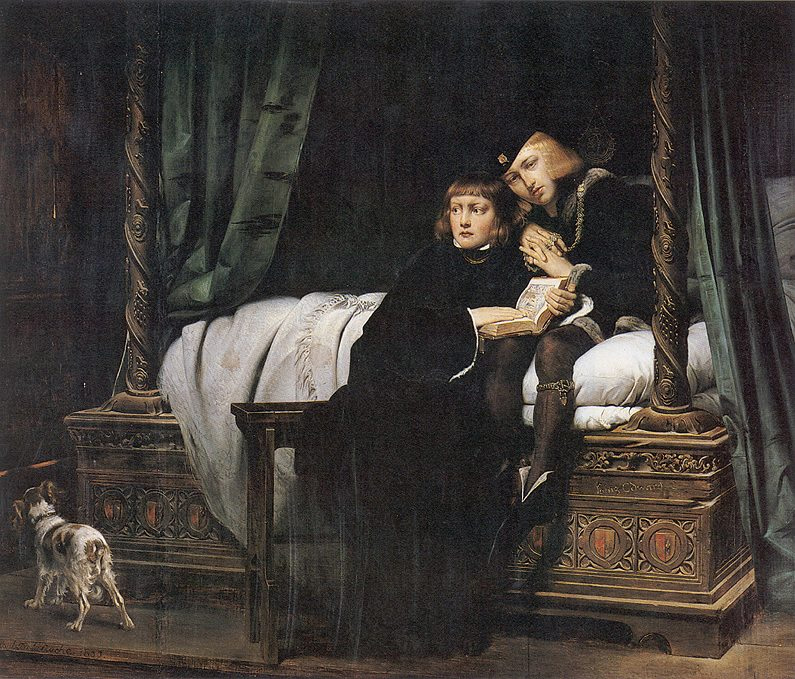
King Edward V and the Duke of York in the Tower of London by Paul Delaroche. The theme of innocent children awaiting an uncertain fate was a popular one amongst 19th-century painters. Louvre, Paris

Dominic Mancini recorded that after Richard III seized the throne, Edward and his brother Richard were taken into the "inner apartments of the Tower" and then were seen less and less until late summer to early autumn 1483, when they disappeared from public view altogether. During this period, Mancini records that Edward was regularly visited by a doctor, who stated that Edward, "like a victim prepared for sacrifice, sought remission of his sins by daily confession and penance, because he believed that death was facing him." The Latin reference to Argentinus medicus was previously translated as "a doctor from Strasbourg", because the Latin name for Strasbourg, Argentoratum, was still current at the time. However, D. E. Rhodes suggests it may refer instead to "Doctor Argentine", whom he identifies as John Argentine, an English physician who later served as provost of King's College, Cambridge, and as doctor to Arthur, Prince of Wales, eldest son of King Henry VII of England.

The princes' fate after their disappearance remains unknown, but the most widely accepted theory is that they were murdered on the orders of their uncle, King Richard. Thomas More (1478–1535) wrote that they were smothered to death with their pillows, and his account forms the basis of William Shakespeare's play Richard III, in which Tyrrell murders the princes on Richard's orders. In the absence of hard evidence, a number of other theories have been put forward. The most widely discussed are that they were murdered on the orders of Henry Stafford, 2nd Duke of Buckingham, or by Henry Tudor. However, A. J. Pollard argues that these theories are less plausible than the straightforward one that they were murdered by their uncle, who in any case controlled access to them and was regarded as responsible for their welfare. In the period before the boys' disappearance, Edward was regularly being visited by a doctor; historian David Baldwin extrapolates that contemporaries may have believed Edward had died of an illness, or as the result of attempts to cure him. An alternative theory is that Perkin Warbeck, a pretender to the throne, was indeed Richard, Duke of York, as he claimed, having escaped to Flanders after his uncle's defeat at Bosworth to be raised by his aunt, Margaret, Duchess of Burgundy.

In 1486, Edward IV's daughter Elizabeth, sister of Edward V, married Henry VII, thereby uniting the Houses of York and Lancaster. In 1516, Dame Margaret Capel bequeathed a chain that had belonged to Edward V to her son Giles Capel. This is one of the few known references to the personal possessions of the Princes in the Tower.

In 2021, researchers from "The Missing Princes Project" claimed to have found evidence that Edward may have lived out his days in the Devon village of Coldridge. They linked the 13-year-old prince with a man named John Evans, who arrived in the village around 1484 and was immediately given an official position and the title of Lord of the Manor. Researcher John Dike noted Yorkist symbols and stained glass windows depicting Edward V in a Coldridge chapel commissioned by Evans and built around 1511, unusual for the location.

Bones belonging to two children were discovered in 1674 by workmen rebuilding a stairway in the Tower. On the orders of King Charles II, these were subsequently placed in Westminster Abbey, in an urn bearing the names of Edward and Richard. The bones were re-examined in 1933, at which time it was found that the skeletons were incomplete and had been interred with animal bones. It has never been proven that the bones belonged to the princes, and it is possible that they were buried before the reconstruction of that part of the Tower of London.

In 1789, workmen carrying out repairs in St George's Chapel, Windsor Castle, rediscovered and accidentally broke into the vault of Edward IV and Elizabeth Woodville. Adjoining this was another vault, which was found to contain the coffins of two children. This tomb was inscribed with the names of two of Edward IV's children who had predeceased him: George, Duke of Bedford, and Mary. However, the remains of these two children were later found elsewhere in the chapel, leaving the occupants of the children's coffins within the tomb unknown.

=== Missing Princes Project ===
In 2022, Philippa Langley led "The Missing Princes Project" to discover the fate of the Princes in the Tower. The project began in 2015, following the reburial of Richard III in Leicester, and was formally launched in July the following year. In 2023, she claimed to have discovered new evidence that disproved the theory that Richard III was responsible for the deaths of the princes. Along with Rob Rinder, she hosted a Channel 4 programme called Princes in the Tower: The New Evidence, in which she presented her own theories and new archival discoveries. Although praising Langley's discoveries, The Spectator's reviewer called the programme "a calculated insult to the viewer"; The Times described it as "compelling" and awarded the documentary its "Critics Choice". The programme achieved a large audience, with Richard III and the Princes in the Tower trending on Twitter / X. The Richard III Society issued a press release stating:

The disappearance of the princes has always been described as a great unsolved mystery. Why? Because there was no evidence of their fate. Their murder was never more than conjecture, but it was put about by the authorities and – for safety's sake – only the brave dared to think differently. From now on, history must take account of this new breakthrough evidence. No longer can anyone confidently claim the princes were killed by Richard III.

Three leading members of the Dutch Research Group who had assisted in the project later distanced themselves from Langley's documentary and book, arguing that the documents they had discovered "are in our own opinion open to various interpretations and do not constitute irrefutable proof" for the survival of the princes. Langley responded that her conclusions were based on "the totality of evidence thus assembled and the outcomes of a modern police missing person investigation methodology ... (and not through a traditional historical research method)". Historian Michael Hicks said that the new documents "do add to knowledge of the Tudor impostors, but they fall short of proof that either Edward V or Richard Duke of York survived beyond their disappearance in the autumn of 1483".

== Epitaph ==
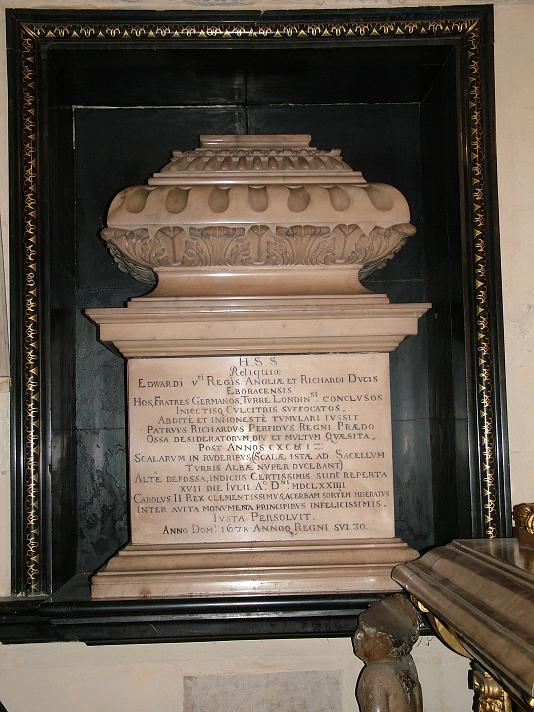
Sarcophagal urn of the presumed bones of Edward V and his younger brother, Richard of Shrewsbury, Duke of York, in Westminster Abbey

As outlined above, on the orders of Charles II, the presumed bones of Edward V and his brother Richard were interred in Westminster Abbey; Edward was thus buried in the place of his birth. The white marble sarcophagus was designed by Sir Christopher Wren and made by Joshua Marshall. It can be found in the north aisle of the Henry VII Chapel, near Elizabeth I's tomb.

The Latin inscription on the urn can be translated as follows:

Here lie the relics of Edward V, King of England, and Richard, Duke of York. These brothers being confined in the Tower of London, and there stifled with pillows, were privately and meanly buried, by the order of their perfidious uncle Richard the Usurper; their bones, long enquired after and wished for, after 191 years in the rubbish of the stairs (those lately leading to the Chapel of the White Tower) were on the 17th day of July AD 1674 by undoubted proofs discovered, being buried deep in that place. Charles II, a most compassionate king, pitying their severe fate, ordered these unhappy princes to be laid amongst the monuments of their predecessors, AD 1678, in the 30th year of his reign.

The original Latin text is as follows (original all in capitals):

H.S S Reliquiæ Edwardi V^{ti} Regis Angliæ et Richardi Ducis Eboracensis

Hos, fratres germanos, Turre Londinˢⁱ conclusos iniectisq[ue] culcitris suffocatos, abdite et inhoneste tumulari iussit patruus Richardus perfidus Regni prædo. Ossa desideratorum, diu et multum quæsita, post annos CXC&I~ scalarum in ruderibus (scalæ istæ ad Sacellum Turris Albæ nuper ducebant) alte defossa, indiciis certissimis sunt reperta XVII die Iulii Aº Dⁿⁱ MDCLXXIIII

Carolus II Rex clementissimus acerbam sortem miseratus inter avita monumenta principibus infelicissimis iusta persolvit. anno domⁱ 1678 annoq[ue] regni sui 30

== Portrayals in fiction ==
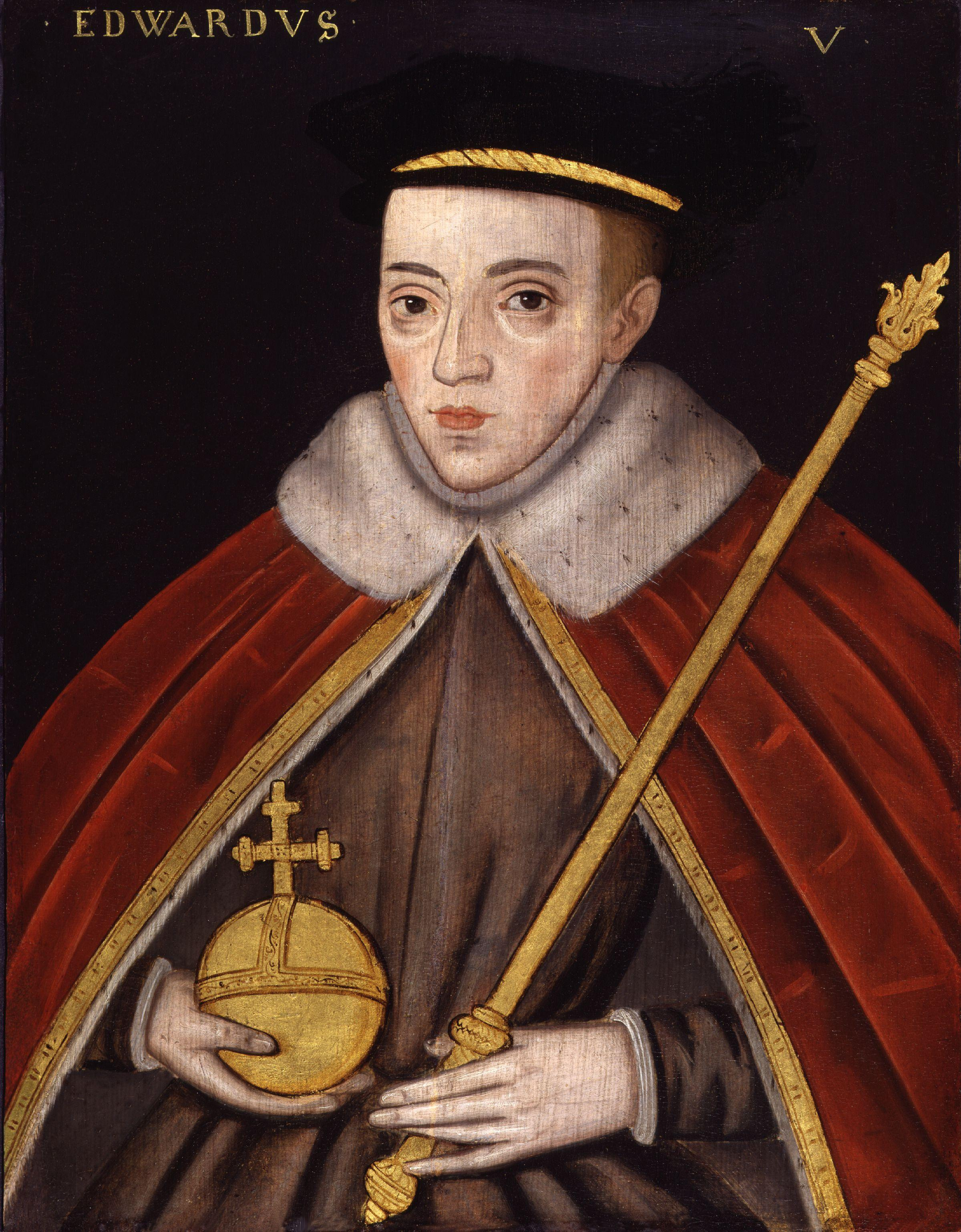
17th century depiction of Edward by an unknown artist

Edward appears as a character in William Shakespeare's Richard III. He appears alive in only one scene (Act 3 Scene 1), during which he and his brother are portrayed as bright, precocious children who see through their uncle's ambitions. Edward is shown as wiser than his years (something his uncle notes) and ambitious about his kingship. The deaths of the princes are described in the play but occur offstage. Their ghosts return in Act 5 Scene 3 to haunt their uncle's dreams and promise success to his rival, Richmond (King Henry VII). In film and television adaptations of the play, Edward V has been portrayed by the following actors:

- Kathleen Yorke in the 1911 silent short dramatising part of the play.
- Howard Stuart in the 1912 silent adaptation.
- Paul Huson in the 1955 film version, alongside Laurence Olivier as Richard.
- Hugh Janes in the 1960 BBC series An Age of Kings, which contained all the history plays from Richard II to Richard III.
- Nicolaus Haenel in the 1964 West German TV version König Richard III.
- Dorian Ford in the 1983 BBC Shakespeare version.
- Spike Hood (voice) in the 1994 BBC series Shakespeare: The Animated Tales.
- Marco Williamson in the 1995 film version, alongside Ian McKellen as Richard.
- Jon Plummer in the 2005 modernised TV version set on a Brighton housing estate.
- Germaine De Leon in the 2007 modern-day adaptation.
- Edward Bracey in the 2014 drama documentary Richard III: The Princes in the Tower.
- Caspar Morley in the BBC's 2016 adaptation of Richard III in the final episode of The Hollow Crown, alongside Benedict Cumberbatch as Richard.

Edward V also appears as a mute role in Shakepeare's Henry VI, Part 3, where he is shown as a newborn baby in the final scene. His father Edward IV addresses his brothers: "Clarence, and Gloster, [sic] love my lovely queen, And kiss your princely nephew, brothers both." Gloster, the future Richard III, is at the close of this play already encompassing his nephew's demise, as he mutters in an aside, "To say the truth, so Judas kiss'd his master, And cried – All hail! when as he meant – all harm."

Edward appears in The White Queen, a 2009 historical novel by Philippa Gregory, and in the subsequent 2013 TV miniseries of the same name, in which he is played by Sonny Ashbourne Serkis.

== Heraldry ==
=== Arms ===
As heir apparent, Edward bore the royal arms (quarterly France and England) differenced by a label of three points argent. During his brief reign, he used the royal arms undifferenced, supported by a lion and a hart as had his father.

Coats of arms of Edward V of England

Coat of arms as heir apparent (1471–1483)

Coat of arms as King Edward V (1483)

=== Badges ===
His livery badges were the traditional Yorkist symbols of the fetterlocked falcon and the rose argent.

Badges of Edward V of England

Falcon and fetterlock

White rose of York

== See also ==
- List of people who disappeared mysteriously (pre-1910)

== Sources ==
=== Works cited ===
- Pollard, A. J. (1991). Richard III and the Princes in the Tower. Alan Sutton Publishing. ISBN 0-8629-9660-0.
- Weir, Alison (1992). The Princes in the Tower. The Bodley Head. ISBN 0-3703-1792-0.

Edward V House of York Cadet branch of the House of Plantagenet Born: 2 November 1470 Died: 1483?
Regnal titles
Preceded by Edward IV	King of England; Lord of Ireland; 1483	Succeeded by Richard III
Peerage of England
Preceded by Edward of Westminster	Prince of Wales; 1471–1483	Succeeded by Edward of Middleham
Preceded by Edward of Westminster	Duke of Cornwall; 1471–1483	Succeeded by Edward of Middleham
