= Bartholomew Lane =

Street in the City of London

Coordinates: 51°30′52.54″N 0°5′15.96″W

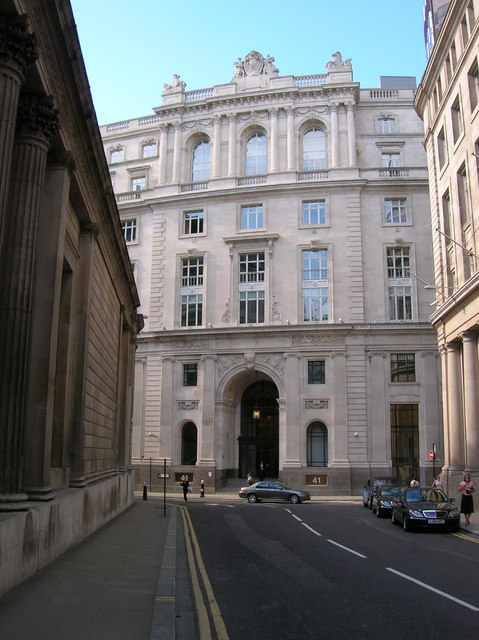
Bartholomew Lane, looking toward the junction with Lothbury

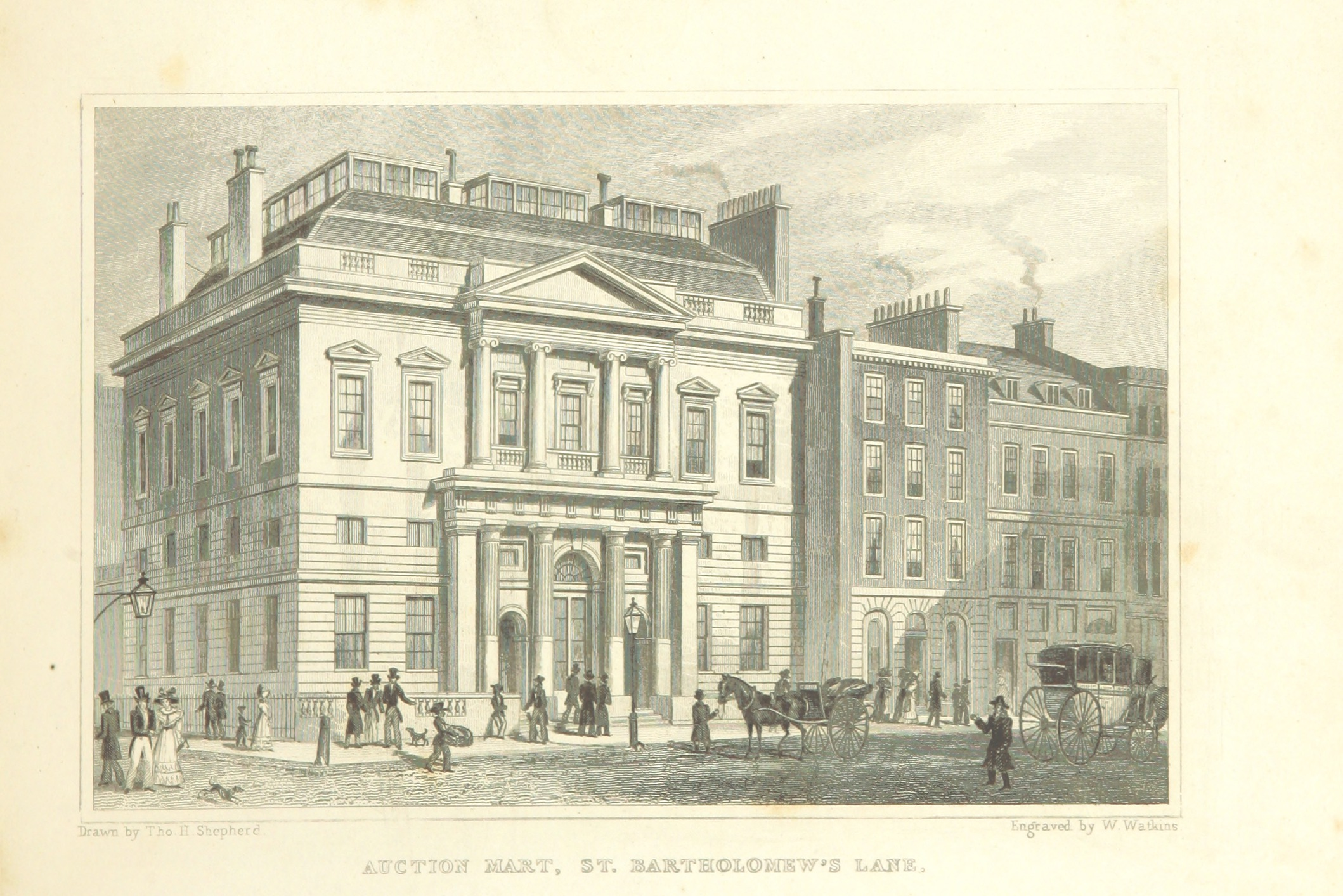
"Auction Mart, St. Bartholomew's Lane", Thomas H. Shepherd, 1828.

Bartholomew Lane, in the City of London, runs between the junction of Lothbury and Throgmorton Street in the north to Threadneedle Street in the south. The lane is bordered on its western side by the Bank of England.

The lane is associated with the auctioneer George Robins, whose premises The Auction Mart stood opposite the rotunda of the Bank.

The church of St Bartholomew-by-the-Exchange stood on the eastern side on the corner with Threadneedle Street until it was destroyed in the Great Fire of 1666. It was rebuilt by the office of Sir Christopher Wren and demolished in 1840.
