= Henry Capell (died 1558) =

English politician

Sir Henry Capell (1505– 1 February 1558) of Ubley, Somerset was an English politician.

== Family background ==
He was the son of Sir Giles Capell of Rayne, Essex, and his first wife Isobel Newton. His grandfather was Sir William Capel, twice Lord Mayor of London.

Henry Capell inherited his Ubley estate, located in Bristol Somerset on the death of his mother c.1512. His father married secondly Marie Ros, a gentlewoman at court, and widow of Hugh Denys.

== Career ==
He was knighted on 8 June 1533 at Greenwich Palace during the festivities on the occasion of the coronation of Anne Boleyn.

He was a Member (MP) of the Parliament of England for Somerset in 1547.

He married Anne Manners, daughter of Anne St. Leger and George Manners, 11th Baron de Ros. They had several children who died in his lifetime. He died in London in 1558 and was buried at St Bartholomew-by-the-Exchange alongside his grandfather. His assets devolved to his brother Edward, who was the father of Henry Capell (MP for Hertfordshire).
