= Dominic Mancini =

Italian religious, and writer on the accession of Richard III of England

Dominic Mancini (Italian: Domenico Mancini) was an Italian Dominican friar who visited England in 1482–3. He witnessed the events leading up to Richard III seizing the English crown. He left in 1483 and wrote a report of what he had witnessed, titling his text De Occupatione Regni Anglie per Riccardum Tercium ('The Occupation of the Throne of England by Richard III'). The account is a major source of information about the period, but it remained lost until rediscovered in 1934 in the Municipal Library of Lille, France, and was subsequently published by C. A. J. Armstrong. A revised and updated edition with new translation was published in 2021 by Annette Carson. This was hailed by Matthew Lewis, chair of the Richard III Society, as a fresh look at a vital source: "Annette Carson has undertaken a mammoth task in retranslating Mancini's account of the controversial events of 1483 between the death of Edward IV and accession of Richard III. The previous translation had been criticised for the way certain words and phrases were selectively translated to fit the prevailing understanding of the events in the 1930's. Carson has gone back to basics and removed such weighting."

Mancini's report was written for Angelo Cato, Archbishop of Vienne, one of the counsellors of King Louis XI and also his doctor and astrologer.

== Works ==
- Mancini, Dominic, The Usurpation of Richard the Third, (C.A.J. Armstrong, translator), Sutton Publishing (1984) ISBN 0-86299-135-8
- Mancini, Dominic. Domenico Mancini de occupatione regni Anglie, (Introduction, historical notes and translation by Annette Carson), Imprimis Imprimatur (2021).

== Sources ==
- Charles Ross, Richard III, University of California Press, Berkeley, CA (1981) ISBN 0-520-05075-4
- Alison Weir, The Princes in the Tower, Ballantine (1993) ISBN 0-345-38372-9
