= St Bartholomew-by-the-Exchange =

Coordinates: 51.51376°N 0.0873°W

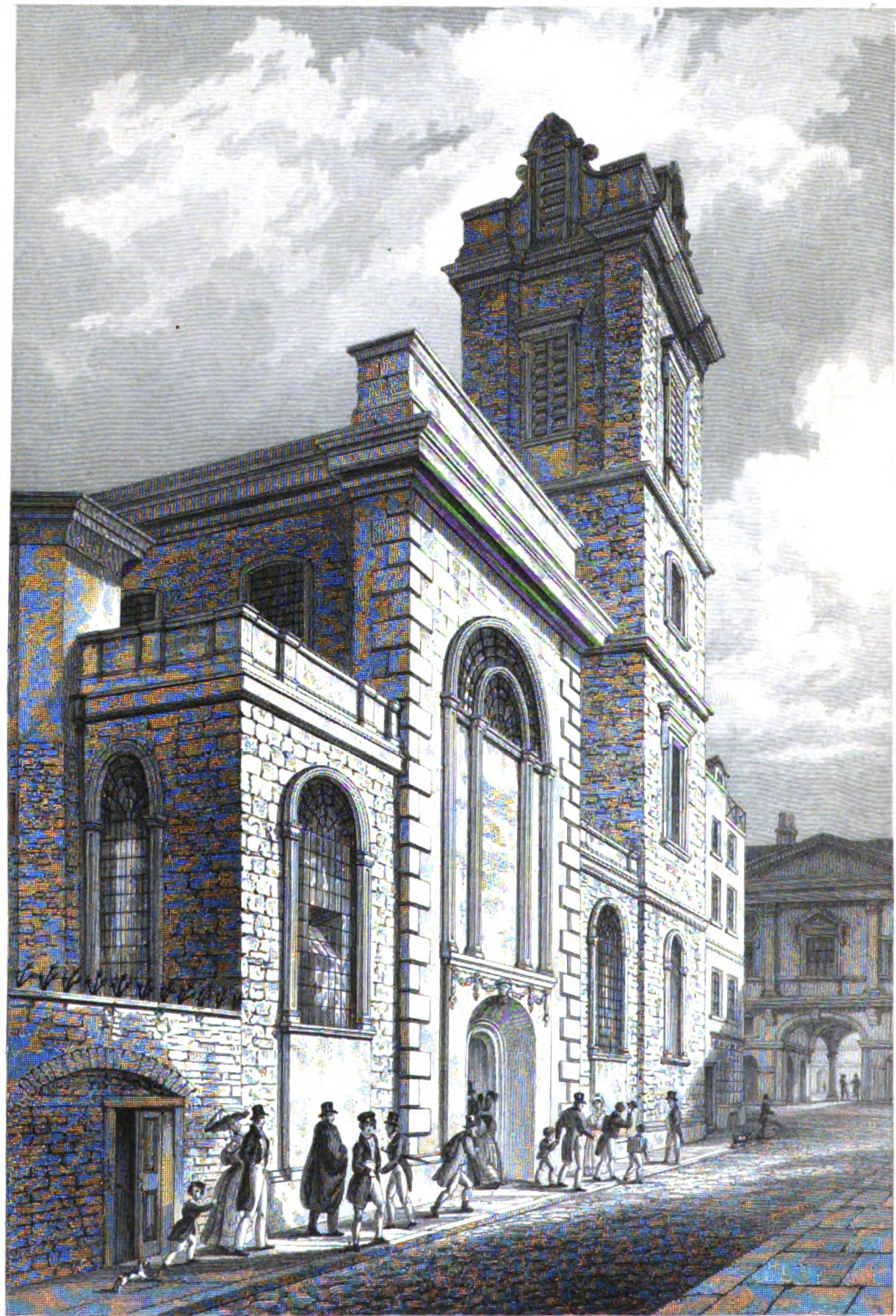
- An engraving of the church in 1839
- St Bartholomew-by-the-Exchange
- Location: London
- Country: England
- Denomination: Anglican

Architecture
- Architect: Christopher Wren
- Style: Baroque
- Demolished: 1840

St. Bartholomew-by-the-Exchange was a church and parish in the City of London located on Bartholomew Lane, off Threadneedle Street. Recorded since the 13th century, the church was destroyed in the Great Fire of London in 1666, then rebuilt by Sir Christopher Wren. The rebuilt church was demolished in 1840.

== Early history ==
St Bartholomew-by-the-Exchange was dedicated to the apostle who, by tradition, was martyred in Armenia by being flayed alive. The Royal Exchange was opened next to the church in 1571.

The earliest surviving reference to the church is in a document of 1225/6. As this was 3½ centuries before the foundation of the Royal Exchange, early references to the church are as “St Bartholomew the Less” or “Little St Bartholomew”, to distinguish it from the priory of St Bartholomew-the-Great. In 1547, upon the Dissolution of the Monasteries, the nearby chapel that stood within St Bartholomew's Hospital itself, was renamed St Bartholomew the Little, as a parish church – it is now called St Bartholomew-the-Less. In the interim between this date and the building of the Royal Exchange, the church later called “St Bartholomew-by-the-Exchange” became lytyll saynt Bathellmuw besyd sunt Antony's.

According to John Stow the church was rebuilt by an alderman assisted by a sheriff in 1438. In 1509, a south chapel was added by Lord Mayor and Draper Sir William Capel, whose mansion was in the parish.

Although he was rector of St Magnus-the-Martyr, Myles Coverdale – the creator of the first complete translation of the Bible into English – was buried in St Bartholomew-by-the-Exchange in 1568. Upon the destruction of the church, his remains were moved to St Magnus-the-Martyr.

== Rebuilding ==
St. Bartholomew-by-the-Exchange was one of 89 churches destroyed in the Great Fire of London. An entry in Robert Hooke's diary of 1674 records a decision to pull down the damaged steeple. Rebuilding began the following year and finished in 1683 at a total cost of £5077.

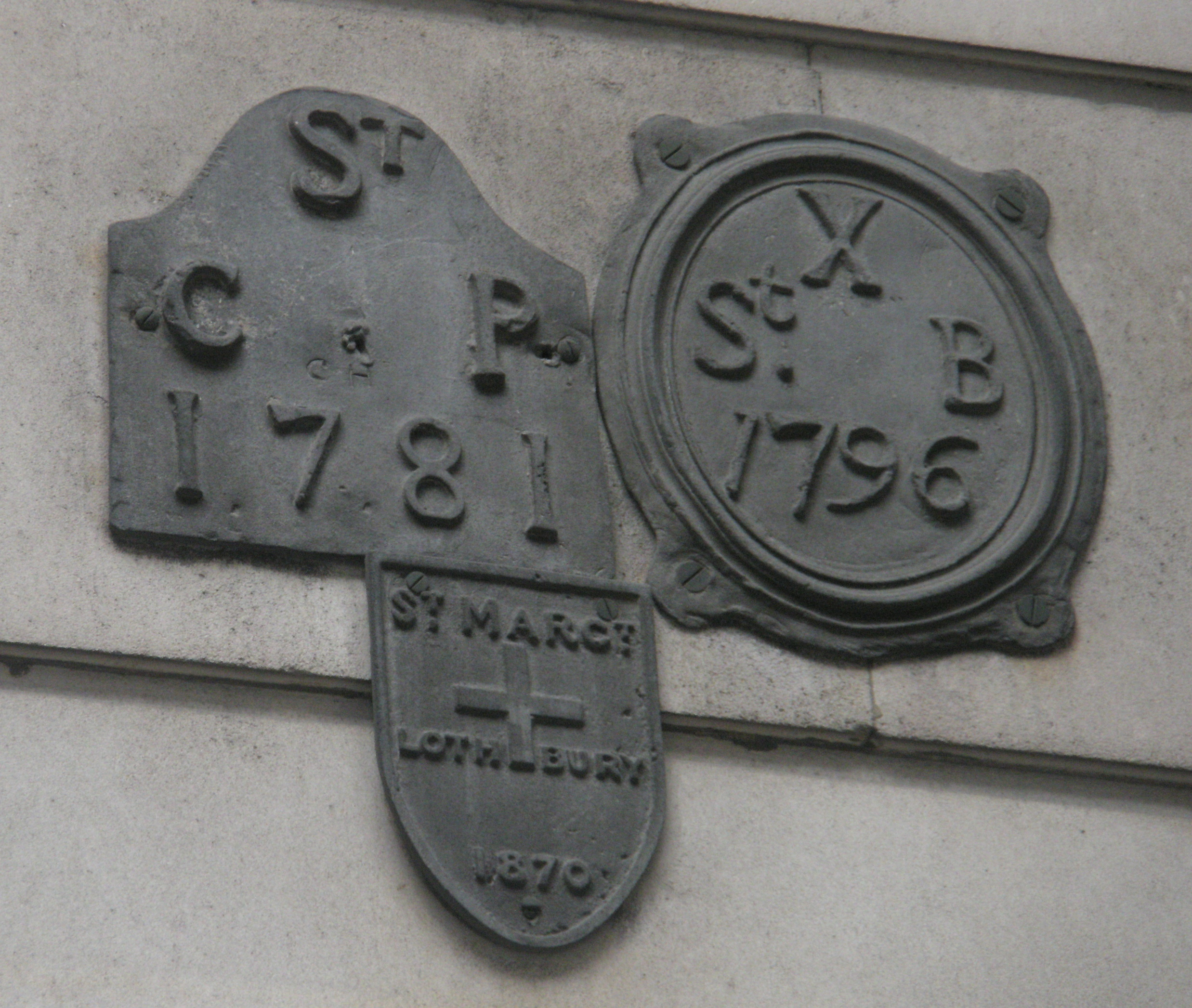
Parish boundary mark on the wall of the Bank of England

The plan of the new church was irregular as it was built on the foundations of its predecessor.

Only the west face of the church, on Bartholomew Lane, was exposed. This was three bays wide, the central bay being equal in width to the two outer bays combined. The two outer bays had large round-headed windows, while the central bay had a Venetian window above the main entrance. The tower was in the southwest corner and was built of brick, with a parapet on top. In the middle of each side was an open arch supported by ramps. This was either a whimsical design or preparation for a steeple that was never erected.

Inside, the church was divided into a nave and two aisles by two rows of eight columns which also supported a clerestory. St Bartholomew's was one of the few Wren churches to have a protruding chancel. In addition to the tower, also projecting from the quadrilateral body from the church was a chapel on the south side – on the site of the 1509 Capel chapel and a vestry room on the northeast corner.

The architectural writer Edward John Carlos described the church's interior as “light and graceful”.

== Demolition ==
In 1838, the Royal Exchange, which had also been rebuilt after the Great Fire of London, burnt down. In order to improve access to the site of the Exchange, the Corporation of London petitioned Parliament for permission to demolish St. Bartholomew-by-the-Exchange – as well as the neighbouring St Benet Fink, so that Threadneedle Street could be widened. This was granted and the church demolished in 1840. Edward John Carlos, writing in The Gentleman's Magazine, prophesied: “The apathy with which the removal of St Bartholomew’s church will be remembered and felt when perhaps the loss of this church will be found a trifle in comparison with the wholesale destruction to which, ere long, the churches of the metropolis may chance to be destined”.

The last service was held on 12 May 1840. The removal of the numerous bodies buried in the church and churchyard began the week after, under he supervision of Mr Toplis, of New Bridge Street. Upwards of a thousand bodies were removed with great care and decorum, including that of ecclesiastical reformer Myles Coverdale buried in 1569.

The parish was combined with that of St Margaret Lothbury and proceeds of the sale of the site were used to build St Bartholomew Moor Lane. This church, designed by Charles Robert Cockerell, was a replica of St. Bartholomew-by-the-Exchange and included much of its furnishings. This, in turn, was demolished in 1902 and the £20,400 realised from the sale of this site were used to build St Bartholomew Stamford Hill.

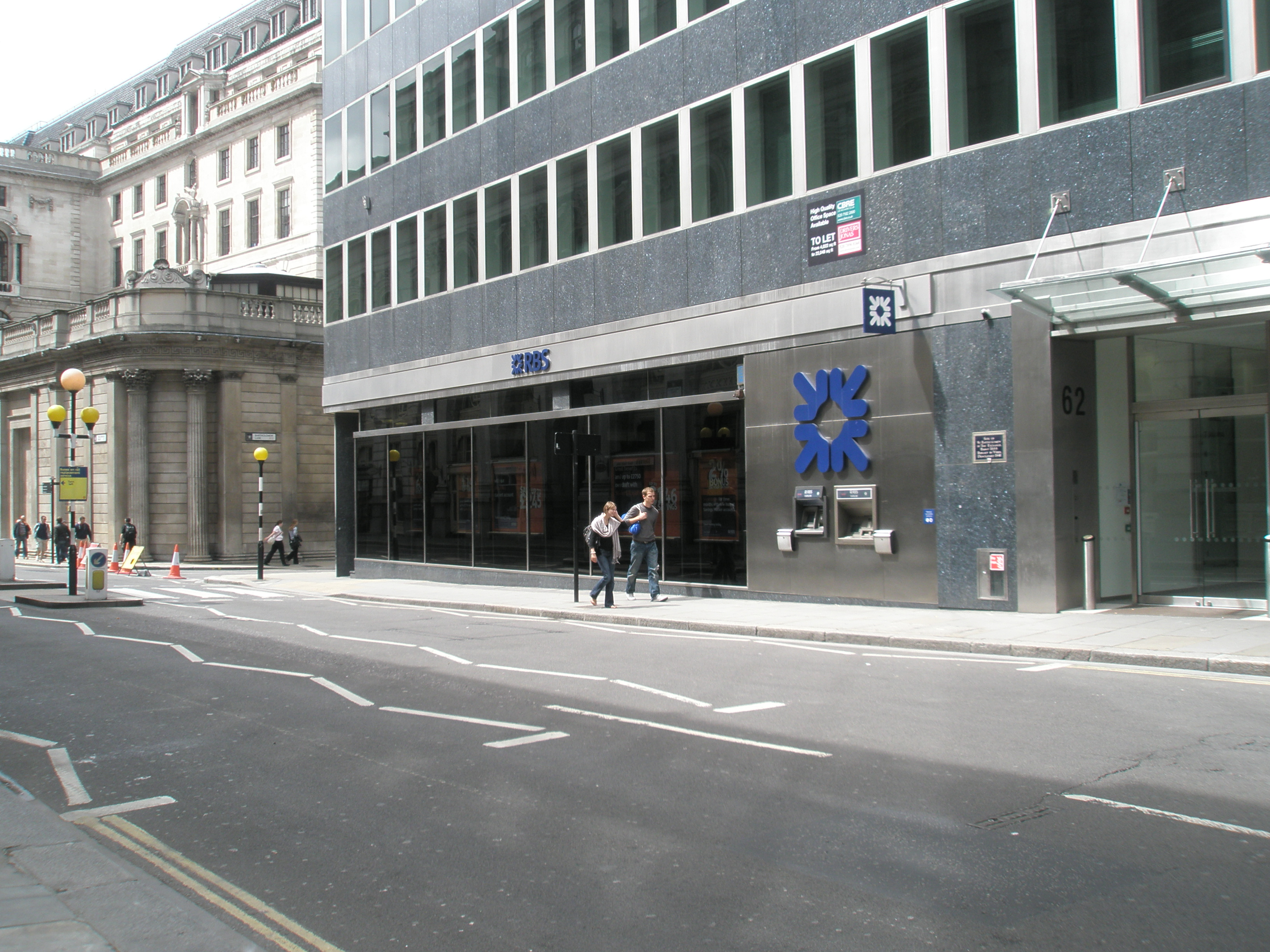
Photo of site in 2008. The Bank of England is at left.

Cockerell also designed the Sun Life Assurance building that was erected on the site of the demolished church. This, in turn, was demolished and the site is now occupied by the Royal Bank of Scotland.

Since the demolition of St Bartholomew-by-the-Exchange, 31 City churches have been lost due to demolition or bombing during World War II.

== See also ==
- List of Christopher Wren churches in London
- List of churches rebuilt after the Great Fire but since demolished

== References and sources ==
Sources

- Jeffery, Paul. The city churches of Sir Christopher Wren, (Hambledon Press, 1996)
- Weinreb, Ben & Hibbert, Christopher (eds.) . The London Encyclopaedia, (Macmillan, 1992)
- Cobb, Gerald. London city churches, (B T Batsford Ltd., 1977)
- Huelin, Gordon. Vanished churches of the City of London, (Guildhall Library Publications, 1996)
