= Robert Scales =

Robert Scales may refer to:

- Robert H. Scales (born 1944), United States Army general
- Robert W. Scales (1926–2000), civic leader and politician in Murfreesboro, Tennessee
- Robert Scales, 1st Baron Scales (died 1304), Knight Templar and loyal supporter of Edward I
- Robert Scales, 2nd Baron Scales (died 1324)
- Robert Scales, 3rd Baron Scales (died 1369)
- Robert Scales, 5th Baron Scales (1372–1402)
- Robert Scales, 6th Baron Scales (c. 1395–1418)
- Bobby Scales (born 1977), American baseball player
