= 1471 =

1471 in various calendars
- Gregorian calendar: 1471; MCDLXXI
- Ab urbe condita: 2224
- Armenian calendar: 920; ԹՎ ՋԻ
- Assyrian calendar: 6221
- Balinese saka calendar: 1392–1393
- Bengali calendar: 877–878
- Berber calendar: 2421
- English Regnal year: 10 Edw. 4 – 11 Edw. 4
- Buddhist calendar: 2015
- Burmese calendar: 833
- Byzantine calendar: 6979–6980
- Chinese calendar: 庚寅年 (Metal Tiger); 4168 or 3961 — to — 辛卯年 (Metal Rabbit); 4169 or 3962
- Coptic calendar: 1187–1188
- Discordian calendar: 2637
- Ethiopian calendar: 1463–1464
- Hebrew calendar: 5231–5232
- Hindu calendars
- Vikram Samvat: 1527–1528
- Shaka Samvat: 1392–1393
- Kali Yuga: 4571–4572
- Holocene calendar: 11471
- Igbo calendar: 471–472
- Iranian calendar: 849–850
- Islamic calendar: 875–876
- Japanese calendar: Bunmei 3 (文明３年)
- Javanese calendar: 1387–1388
- Julian calendar: 1471; MCDLXXI
- Korean calendar: 3804
- Minguo calendar: 441 before ROC 民前441年
- Nanakshahi calendar: 3
- Thai solar calendar: 2013–2014
- Tibetan calendar: ལྕགས་ཕོ་སྟག་ལོ་ (male Iron-Tiger); 1597 or 1216 or 444 — to — ལྕགས་མོ་ཡོས་ལོ་ (female Iron-Hare); 1598 or 1217 or 445

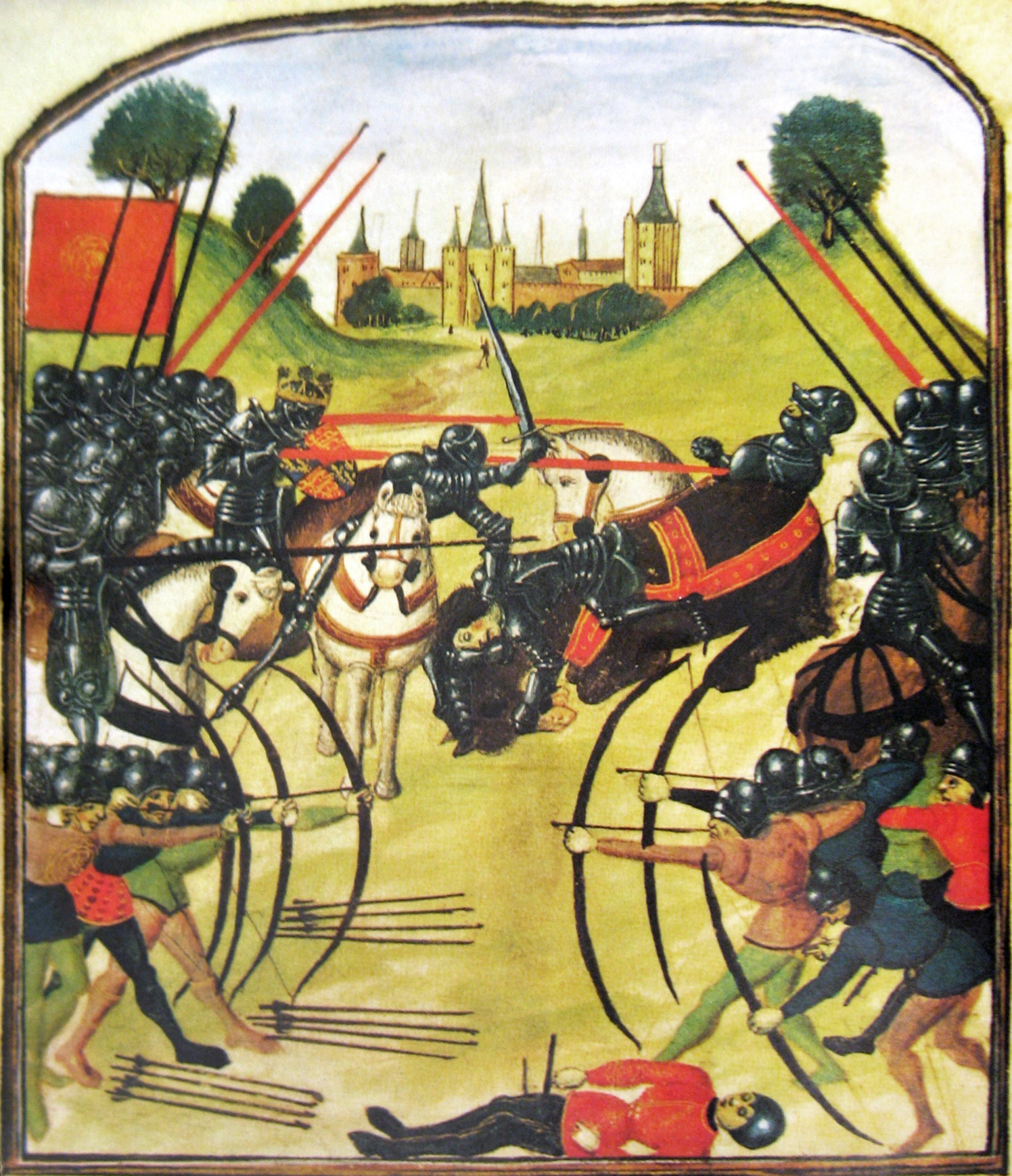
The Battle of Tewkesbury is fought, restoring Edward IV.

Year 1471 (MCDLXXI) was a common year starting on Tuesday of the Julian calendar.

== Events ==
=== January–March ===
- January 4 – Charles the Bold, Duke of Burgundy agrees to help Edward IV regain the English throne from King Henry VI.
- January 17 – Portuguese navigators João de Santarém and Pedro Escobar discover the uninhabited island of Príncipe (now part of the nation of São Tomé and Príncipe ). They initially call it "Ilha de Santo Antão" because they land it on the feast day of Saint Anthony.
- January 22 – At age 15, Prince João of Aviz, the eldest son of King Afonso V, marries his 12-year-old first cousin, Leonor de Avis. Both are grandchildren of King Duarte I of Portugal.
- January – Portuguese navigators João de Santarém and Pedro Escobar reach the gold-trading centre of Elmina on the Gold Coast of west Africa, and explore Cape St. Catherine, two degrees south of the equator, so that they begin to be guided by the Southern Cross constellation. They also visit Sassandra on the Ivory Coast.
- February 10 – Albrecht III Achilles becomes the new Elector of Brandenburg upon the abdication of his older brother, Friedrich II, who had guided the electorate since 1440.
- February 24 – In what is now south Vietnam, the Champa–Dai Viet War begins when the Dai Viet Emperor Lê Thánh Tông sends 500 warships to block the Champa Kingdom's Bay of Sa Ky, while another 30,000 troops block all entrances to the capital city of Vijaya at what is now the Quảng Ngãi Province. The Me Can citadel in Quang Na falls two days later and the Vietnamese advance.
- March 15 – With the help of a group of mercenaries lent to him by Charles the Bold of Burgundy, the Yorkist King Edward IV returns to England to reclaim his throne, landing near Hull, after having departed from Holland on March 11.
- March 22 – The Empire of Dai Viet in north Vietnam triumphs over the Champa Kingdom of south Vietnam after Dai Viet Emperor Le Thanh Tong ignores the offer of Champa King Tra Toan to surrender Vijaya. After the city walls are breached, King Tra Toan, his family and 30,000 other Chams are captured as prisoners, while over 60,000 other Chams are killed. Another 40,000 residents who did not die in the fighting are executed.

=== April–June ===
- April 14 – At the Battle of Barnet, Edward defeats the Lancastrian army under Warwick, who is killed.
- May 4 – At the Battle of Tewkesbury, King Edward defeats a Lancastrian army led by Queen Margaret and her son, Edward of Westminster, Prince of Wales. Edward is killed in the battle.
- May 12 – The siege of London is attempted by hundreds of supporters of England's House of Lancaster, who are attempting to free the former King Henry VI from imprisonment in the Tower of London. Led by Thomas Neville, the Lancastrians set cannons up on the south bank of the Thames and attempt to bombard London, but are unable to break the defense put up by Londoners led by Edward Woodville, Lord Scales, and the attack fails after three days.
- May 21 – King Edward IV celebrates his victories with a triumphal parade on his return to London. The captured Queen Margaret is paraded through the streets. On the same day Henry VI of England is murdered in the Tower of London, eliminating all Lancastrian opposition to the House of York.
- May 27 – Two months after the death of King George of Poděbrady, the Diet of Bohemian nobles meets at Kutná Hora and elects Vladislaus Jagiello as the new King of Bohemia. The papal legate, Lorenzo Roverella, Bishop of Ferrara, declares the election void with the approval of Pope Paul II, and endorses Matthias Corvinus, King of Hungary, to be the new King of Bohemia, which the Imperial Diet of the Holy Roman Empire refuses to approve.
- June 26 – Edward of York, the 7-month-old son of King Edward IV of England, is created Prince of Wales, two months after his father has regained the throne.

=== July–September ===
- July 14 – At the Battle of Shelon, the forces of Muscovy defeat the Republic of Novgorod.
- July 26 – Pope Paul II dies of a heart attack. at age 54 after a reign of almost seven years, leaving the Roman Catholic Church papacy vacant.
- August 6 – Eleven days after the death of Pope Paul II, the papal conclave begins in Rome with 18 of the 25 cardinals present. On the initial vote, with 12 needed to win, Basilios Bessarion of Greece gets six, and Guillaume d'Estouteville of France and Niccolò Fortiguerra of Italy receive three each.
- August 9 – Cardinal Francesco della Rovere, who received no votes in the initial round of balloting in the papal conclave, receives 13 votes and is elected as the new Pontiff of the Roman Catholic Church. He takes the regnal name of Pope Sixtus IV to become the 212th pope.
- August 22 –
  - King Afonso V of Portugal conquers the Moroccan town of Arzila.
  - Vladislav Jagellion is crowned as King of Bohemia at Prague.
- August 29 – The Portuguese occupy Tangier, after its population flees the city.
- September 21 – After making his way to Prague, convening a session of the Bohemian Diet and making promises to members of the nobility, Hungarian King Matthias Corvinus receives vows of loyalty from more than 50 Bohemian nobles, who agree to support Matthias's claim to be King of Bohemia rather than to accept the rule of Prince Casimir of Poland.
- September 22 – After being tracked down by King Edward IV and taken prisoner at Southampton, the rebel Thomas Neville is beheaded at Middleham Castle in his native Yorkshire.

=== October–December ===
- October 2 – Eleven days after Hungary's King Matthias is supported to be King of Bohemia, Prince Casimir of Poland, a younger son of King Casimir IV (who is later canonised as a Roman Catholic saint) leads an army on an invasion of Bohemia and begins a war against Hungary.
- October 10 – Battle of Brunkeberg in Stockholm, Sweden: The forces of Regent of Sweden Sten Sture the Elder, with the help of farmers and miners, repel an attack by Christian I, King of Denmark.
- November 12 – Shah Suwar, the ruler of the independent Ottoman Governor of the semi-independent Anatolian Turk Beylik of Dulkadir is defeated by the army of the Egyptian Mamluk General Yashbak min Mahdi in a battle at Kars, sustaining more than 300 soldiers lost and losing most of his lands in what is now southeastern Turkey. After fleeing to the castle of Zamantu for refuge, Suwar is cornered again by Yashbak and surrenders on June 4, 1472, and executed two months later.
- November 25 – Nicolò Tron is elected as the new Doge of the Republic of Venice, 15 days after the death of the Doge Cristoforo Moro, who had governed the Republic since 1461.
- December 25 – The Great Comet of 1472 is first observed from Earth passing in front of the constellation of Virgo. The comet is recorded by astronomers in Korea and by the German astronomers Regiomontanus and Bernhard Walther, and will come within 6.5 million miles of Earth, the closest in recorded history that a great comet approaches. The comet is visible for 59 days, disappearing after March 1.

=== Date unknown ===
- Orkney and Shetland were absorbed into Scotland.
- Pachacuti Inca Yupanqui of the Inca Empire dies, and is succeeded by his son Topa Inca Yupanqui.
- Moorish exiles from Spain, led by Moulay Ali Ben Moussa Ben Rached El Alami, found the city of Chefchaouen in the north of Morocco.
- Marsilio Ficino's translation of the Corpus Hermeticum into Latin, De potestate et sapientia Dei, is published.
- World population reaches 500 million.

== Births ==
- April 6 – Margaret of Hanau-Münzenberg, German noblewoman (d. 1503)
- May 21 – Albrecht Dürer, German artist, writer and mathematician (d. 1528)
- July 15 – Eskender, Emperor of Ethiopia (d. 1494)
- July 22 – Anthony Kitchin, British bishop (d. 1563)
- July 31 – Jan Feliks "Szram" Tarnowski, Polish nobleman (d. 1507)
- August 27 – George, Duke of Saxony (d. 1539)
- September 8 – William III, Landgrave of Hesse (d. 1500)
- October 7 – King Frederick I of Denmark and Norway (d. 1533)
- date unknown
  - John Forrest, English martyr and friar (d. 1538)
  - Edmund de la Pole, 3rd Duke of Suffolk (d. 1513)

== Deaths ==
- January 18 – Emperor Go-Hanazono of Japan (b. 1418)
- February 10 – Frederick II, Margrave of Brandenburg (b. 1413)
- February 21 – John of Rokycan, Archbishop of Prague (b. c. 1396)
- March 14 – Thomas Malory, English author (b. c. 1405)
- March 22 – George of Poděbrady, first elected King of Bohemia (b. 1420)
- April 14
  - John Neville, 1st Marquess of Montagu (b. 1431)
  - Richard Neville, 16th Earl of Warwick, English nobleman, known as "the Kingmaker" (b. 1428)
- May 4 – Edward of Westminster, Prince of Wales (in battle) (b. 1453)
- May 6
  - Edmund Beaufort, 4th Duke of Somerset (executed) (b. 1438)
  - Thomas Tresham, Speaker of the House of Commons
- May 21 – King Henry VI of England (murdered in prison) (b. 1421)
- July 25 – Thomas à Kempis, German monk and writer (b. 1380)
- July 26 – Pope Paul II (b. 1417)
- August 20 – Borso d'Este, Duke of Ferrara (b. 1413)
- November 8 – Louis II, Landgrave of Lower Hesse (1458–1471) (b. 1438)
- December 17 – Infanta Isabel, Duchess of Burgundy (b. 1397)
- date unknown
  - Pachacuti, Inca emperor (b. 1438)
  - P'an-Lo T'ou-Ts'iuan, last independent King of Champa
  - Shin Sawbu, queen regnant of Hanthawaddy in southern Burma (b. 1394)
