= Countess Rivers =

Countess Rivers may refer to:

- Jacquetta of Luxembourg (1415/16–1472) (wife of the 1st Earl)
- Elizabeth Woodville, Countess Rivers (d.1473) (wife of the 2nd Earl)
- Elizabeth Savage, Countess Rivers (née Darcy; 1581–1650) (created countess for life in her own right in 1641)
