= Middleton Towers =

Grade I listed building in the United Kingdom

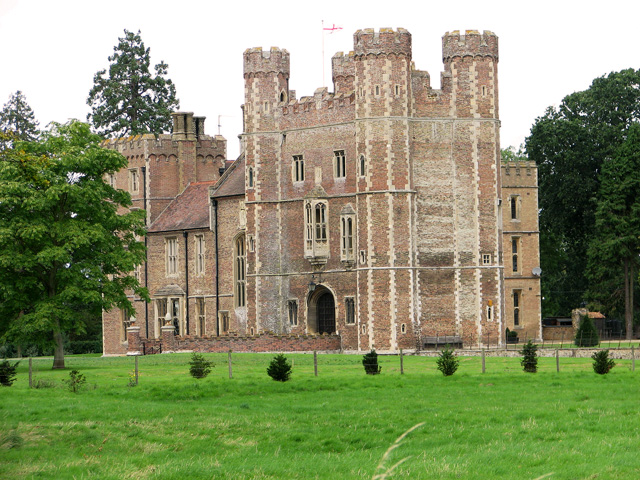
- Looking from the south-east towards the gatehouse and the 19th-century house behind

- Location within Norfolk

General information
- Status: Grade I listed
- Location: Norfolk grid reference TF 669 176, United Kingdom
- Coordinates: 52°43′48″N 0°28′11″E

Middleton Towers is a privately owned country house in Norfolk, England, near the village of Middleton and about 3 miles (5 km) east of King's Lynn. The hall is a Grade I listed building, and the adjacent earthworks are a scheduled monument. The building, within a moat, consists of a 15th-century gatehouse and a house of the late 19th and early 20th century.

== History ==
The de Scales family had the lordship of the manor from the reign of Henry II in the 12th century. The gatehouse was built about 1455 by Thomas Scales, 7th Baron Scales. It is thought that a house was begun, adjacent to the gatehouse, by him and continued by his daughter Elizabeth Scales, 8th Baroness Scales and her husband Anthony Woodville, 2nd Earl Rivers. Elizabeth died without issue in 1473: Woodville was executed in 1483 by order of Richard Duke of Gloucester (later Richard III). The manor was subsequently granted to John Howard, 1st Duke of Norfolk, who died in 1485 at the Battle of Bosworth.

Prints of drawings of the 18th and early 19th century show the gatehouse standing to full height but roofless, and fragments of a ruined building on its left. In 1856 the property was bought by Sir Lewis Whincop Jarvis (1816–1888), a prominent citizen of King's Lynn and head of the local bank Jarvis and Jarvis. Between 1864 and 1876 he restored the gatehouse and built an adjacent house. After his death the property was sold. John Taylor Ramsden (1835–1916), owner of the Stone Trough Brewery in Halifax in Yorkshire, acquired Middleton Towers in 1904, and in 1905 added a west wing to the house.

== Description ==
The moat, which contains water, encloses a rectangular island about 74 metres (243 ft) west to east by 40 metres (130 ft) north to south. The gatehouse, at the centre of the south side of the island, is of brick with stone dressings; it has three storeys, embattled parapets and polygonal corner turrets. The first floor has a central oriel window and bears the coat of arms of Anthony Woodville. To the west of the gatehouse, on the south and west sides of the island, are the later buildings.

There are earthworks east of the moat: two rectangular fishponds can be discerned about 16 metres (52 ft) east of the moat, and north-east of the ponds is a rectangular platform, 12 metres (39 ft) north to south by 10 metres (33 ft) west to east, thought to be the site of a dovecote. There are other features to the east, traces probably of medieval buildings associated with the manor.
