= Richard Woodville =

Richard Woodville may refer to:

- Richard Woodville, 1st Earl Rivers (1405–1469), English nobleman, father of Elizabeth Woodville, wife of Edward IV
- Richard Woodville, 3rd Earl Rivers (1453–1491), son of the above, brother of Elizabeth Woodville
- Richard Woodville (died 1441), father-in-law of William Haute (MP), Captain of Calais and High Sheriff of Kent
- Richard Caton Woodville (1825–1855), American artist
- Richard Caton Woodville Jr. (1856–1927), English artist and illustrator
