= Thomas Scales, 7th Baron Scales =

15th-century English noble

Thomas Scales Baron Scales
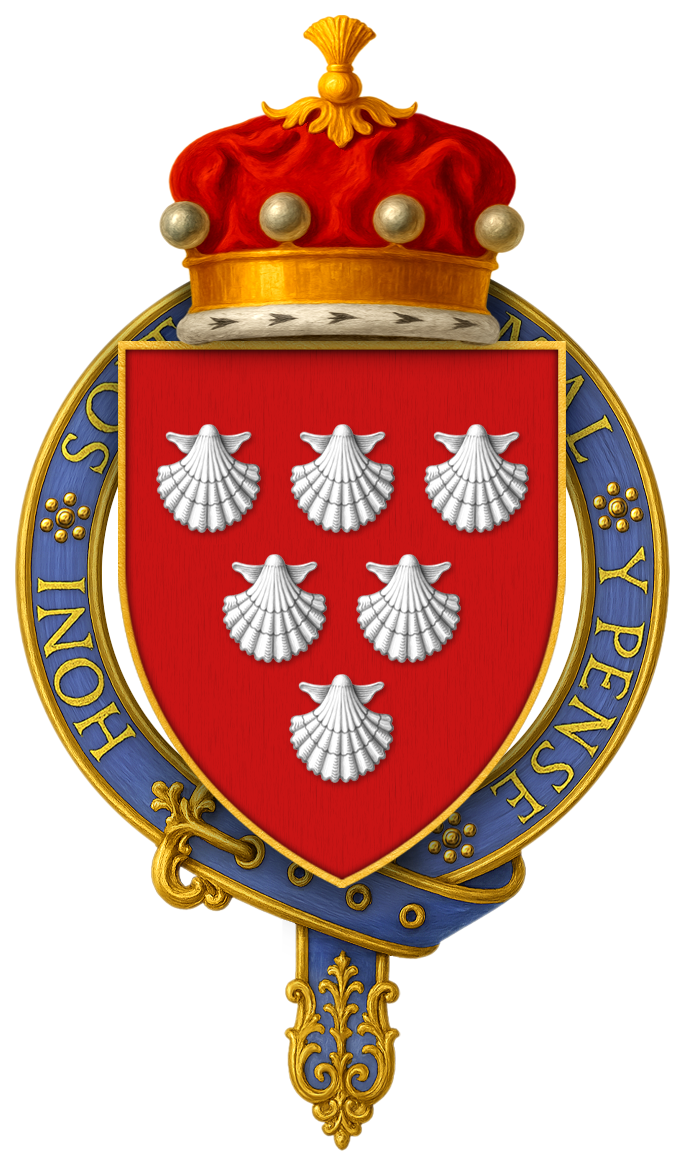
- Arms of Sir Thomas Scales, 7th Baron Scales
- Born: 9 October 1399; Middleton, Norfolk, England
- Died: 20 July 1460 (aged 60); London
- Cause of death: Murder
- Occupations: Soldier, administrator
- Known for: Military service during the Hundred Years' War
- Office: Seneschal of Normandy
- Children: Elizabeth, 8th Baroness Scales
- Parents: Robert, 5th Lord Scales (father); Elizabeth Bardolf (mother)
- Relatives: Robert, 6th Lord Scales (brother)

Thomas Scales, 7th Baron Scales KG (9 October 1399 – 20 July 1460) was an English nobleman and one of the main English military commanders in the last phase of the Hundred Years' War. The son of Robert de Scales, 5th Baron Scales (c. 1372–1402), he succeeded his brother Robert de Scales, 6th Baron Scales (died July 1419) as baron.

Thomas distinguished himself in France, against Jack Cade and in many other places. He was rewarded with a grant of £100 a year during his life and the privilege of a 200-tonne ship to transport goods wherever he saw fit (excluding Calais). He was summoned to Parliament from 1445 to 1460.

Scales was an important man of considerable wealth. This is alluded to in Shakespeare's Henry VI, Part 3: King Edward IV's brothers George and Richard complain to Edward about his bestowal of Scales' heiress (one of the wealthiest in England) on his Queen's brother, instead of one of them.

== Family ==
Thomas Scales was born on 9 October 1399 at Middleton, Norfolk, and was baptized there. He was the second son of Robert de Scales, 5th Baron Scales (c. 1372–1402), and Elizabeth Bardolf (d. 1441), daughter of William Bardolf, 4th Baron Bardolf. Thomas inherited the barony of Scales after the death of his brother Robert, 6th Lord Scales (1397–1419).

== Military commander ==
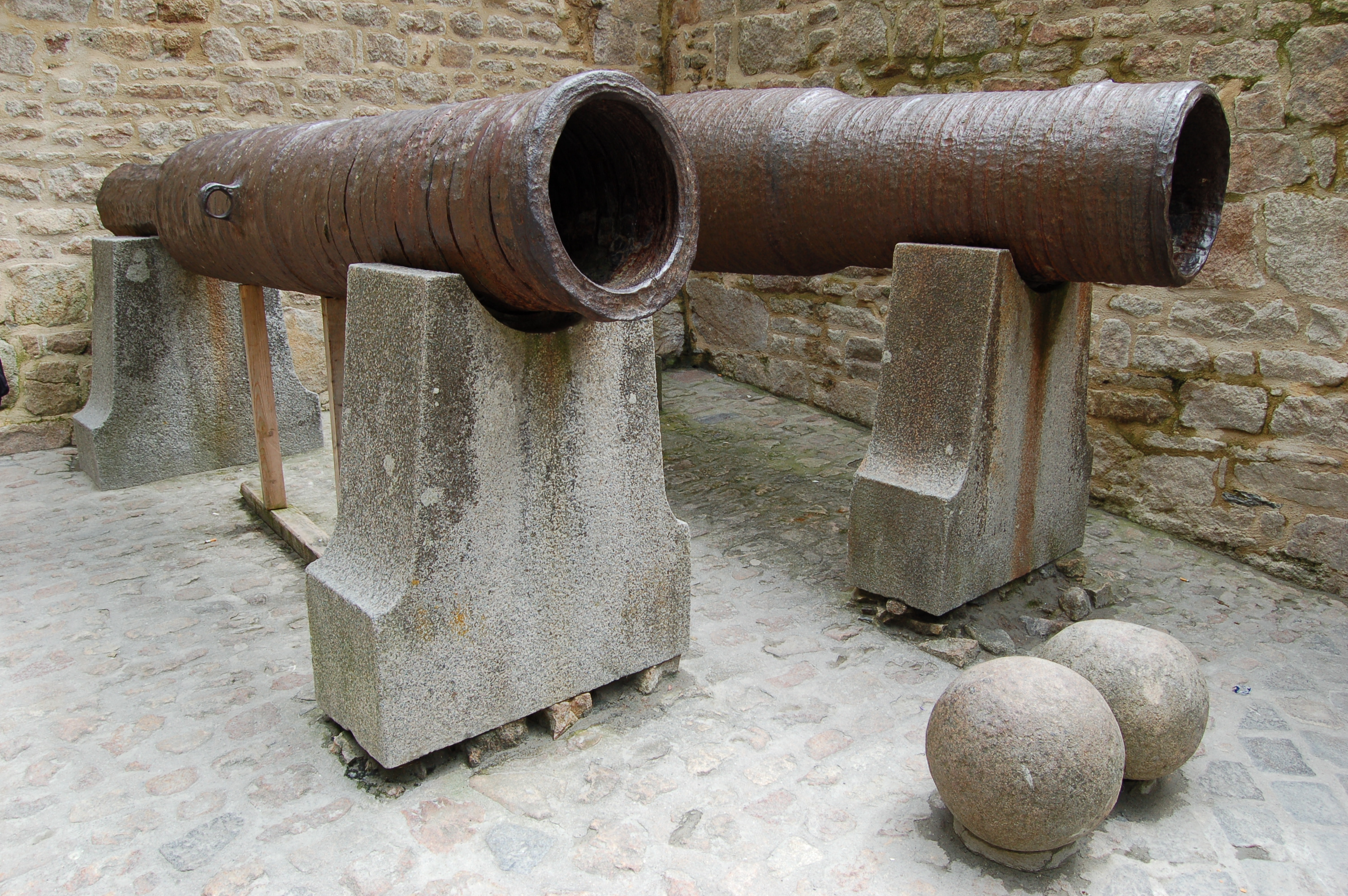
Cannons abandoned by Scales on display at Mont-Saint-Michel

In 1422, Scales crossed the Channel to Normandy, and served as a lieutenant of John, Duke of Bedford. By 1423, Scales was captain of Verneuil. From 1424 to 1425, he fought alongside John Fastolf to recapture the fortress at Maine. He was captured at the Battle of Patay in 1429 and later ransomed. In 1434, he commanded an assault against the French-held Mont-Saint-Michel in Normandy, which ended in failure and led Scales to abandon his cannons behind him (since then displayed inside the city).

According to a recruitment roll now at the National Army Museum, he commanded a corps of 728 archers (some with fire-tipped arrows) and about 50 infantry at the siege of Saint-Denis. In 1439, to cut off Mont-Saint-Michel, at the end of the French bridge in English-held territory, he founded the citadel of Granville. In 1442 Granville was taken by surprise by the French defenders of the Mont. In the Wars of the Roses Scales fought for Lancaster, and as such appears in Shakespeare's Henry VI, Part 2. On 20 July 1460 Scales was murdered, having, as commander of the Tower of London, turned its weapons against the city which was supporting the Yorkist Earl of Salisbury in besieging the Tower.

== Residences ==
Thomas held Rivenhall in Essex; Newsells and Barkway in Hertfordshire; and Ilsington, Middelton, Lynne, Hardwicke, Rongeton, Tylney and Clenchwarton in Norfolk.

== Coat of arms ==
Gules, six escallops argent

== Marriage ==
Thomas married Ismayne Whalesburgh (aka Esmania aka Ismaine, aka Emma Whalseborough) in Paris in November, 1424. They had two children:

- Thomas Scales (died in infancy)
- Elizabeth de Scales Woodville, Baroness Scales (died 2 September 1473), married Henry Bourchier, second son of Henry Bourchier, 1st Earl of Essex and his wife Isabel of Cambridge, Countess of Essex who died in 1458, then Anthony Woodville, 2nd Earl Rivers as her second husband.

Peerage of England
Preceded by Robert Scales	Baron Scales; 1419–1460	Succeeded by Elizabeth Scales
