= Baron Scales =

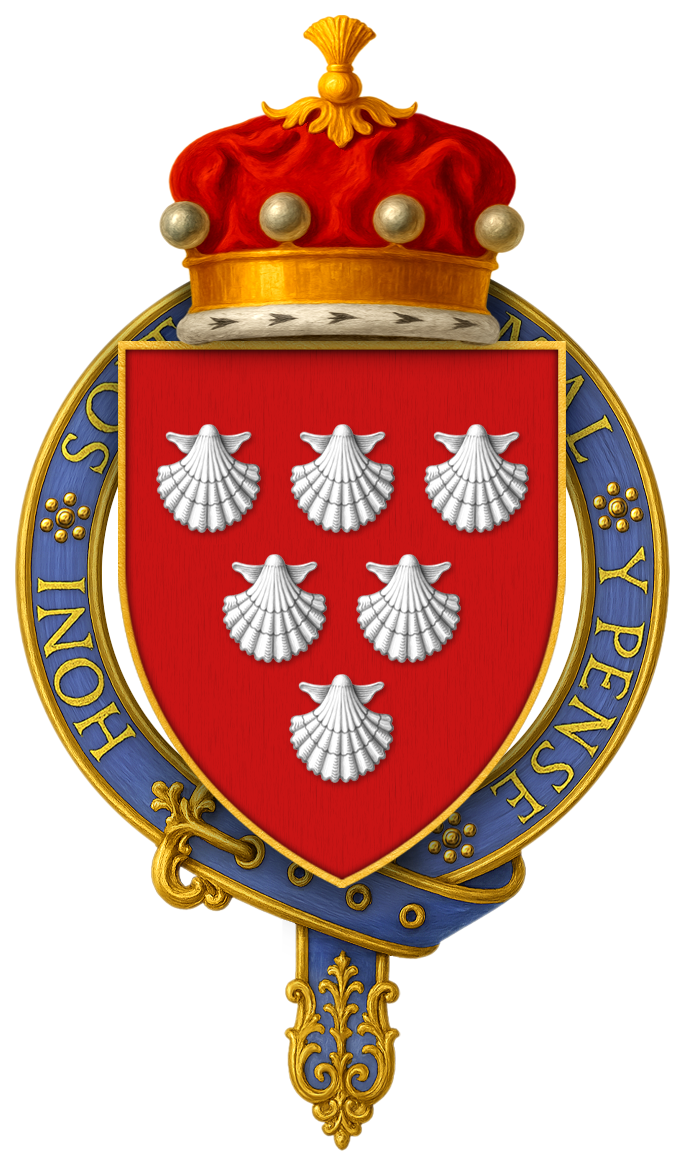
Coat of arms of Thomas Scales, 7th Baron Scales

Baron Scales is a title in the Peerage of England.

== Origin ==
=== Robert de Scales ===
The ancestors of the Baron Scales came into possession of the manors of Newsells, Hertfordshire and Rivenhall, Essex in 1255 by the marriage of Sir Robert de Scales to Alice de Rochester (or de Roffa/Rossa), whose family had held the manors since 1210. Robert died in 1256.

Robert is probably the same Robert as mentioned in some, or all, of the following references:-

- 1232-33 Sir Robert de Scales lord of the manors of Bedenested and Scolegh in Essex, Parva Willington in Kent and Lynne, Middelton and Ilsington in Norfolk.
- 1242-43 Sir Robert de Scales lord of the manors of Parva Wilmynton in Kent, Wilton, Hocwolde, Herdwic and Nudebonve in Norfolk, Wetherden and Wridelincton in Suffolk

=== Peter de Scales ===
Robert's eldest son who inherited his father's lands but died shortly afterwards in 1258.

=== Robert de Scales ===
Peter's younger brother who inherited their father's lands upon Peter's death in 1258. Robert was involved in several expeditions to France and had summons to Parliament. He was listed at Dover Castle from 1261-2, as was a Sir Radulfus de Escales. Upon Robert's death in 1266 he was succeeded by his son Robert, who he had by his wife Muriel, and who was to become the first of the Baron Scales. Left a widow called Clemencia

== History of the Barony ==
The Scales barony was created in 1299 by writ for Robert de Scales.

The last known holders were Elizabeth de Scales and her husband Anthony Woodville, 2nd Earl Rivers. After Elisabeth's death in 1473, Anthony was summoned in her right. Anthony was beheaded by Richard III at Pontefract on 24 Jun 1483 and the peerage fell into abeyance. However, after the death of Anthony, his younger brother Edward Woodville, a supporter of Henry Tudor, styled himself Lord Scales, having been bequeathed Elizabeth's land by his brother.

Several people have subsequently tried to claim the title but none have been successful. The most recent was made by Sir Charles Robert Tempest who claimed to be a co-heir in 1857.

== Residences ==
The Scales family's main residences were Middleton in Norfolk, Newsells in Hertfordshire and Rivenhall in Essex but also held other lands including Ouresby and Torneton in Lincolnshire.

== Barons Scales (1299) ==
- Robert de Scales, 1st Baron Scales (d. 1304)
- Robert de Scales, 2nd Baron Scales (d. 1324)
- Robert de Scales, 3rd Baron Scales (d. 1369)
- Roger de Scales, 4th Baron Scales (d. 1386)
- Robert de Scales, 5th Baron Scales (d. 1402)
- Robert de Scales, 6th Baron Scales (d. 1418)
- Thomas de Scales, 7th Baron Scales (d. 1460)
- Elizabeth de Scales Woodville, Baroness Scales (d. 2 September 1473)
