= Roger Scales, 4th Baron Scales =

English nobleman and parliamentary summons recipient, died 1387

Roger de Scales
- Born: 1354
- Died: 1387 (aged 32–33)
- Relatives: Robert de Scales, 3rd Baron Scales (father)
- Military career
- Allegiance: England

Roger Scales, 4th Baron Scales (1354–1387) was one of the 'eminent persons' forced by the rebels to march with them upon the insurrection of Jack Straw in 1381. He was a commissioner of the peace for Cambridgeshire and Norfolk for many of the years between 1373 and 1386. He was summoned to Parliament from 1376 until his death in 1386. He attended the Coronation of Richard II in 1377.

== Residences ==
Roger's main residence was at Rivenhall in Essex. He also held Haselingfeld in Cambridgeshire and gained Shaldford in Essex and lands in Kent through his marriage.

== Family ==
Roger married Joan, daughter of, Sir John de Northwode. They had the following children:-

- Robert de Scales, 5th Baron Scales (1372–1402)

Joan later remarried to Sir Edmund de Thorpe, Jnr., without licence.

Peerage of England
Preceded by Robert de Scales	Baron Scales; 1369–1387	Succeeded by Robert de Scales
