= Carisbrooke Castle =

Castle on the Isle of Wight, United Kingdom

- Carisbrooke, Isle of Wight, England
- Carisbrooke Castle in October 2026

Site information
- Type: Castle
- Owner: Managed by English Heritage
- Open to the public: Yes
- Condition: Complete

Location
- Location within Isle of Wight
- Coordinates: 50.6874°N 1.3133°W
- Grid reference: grid reference SZ486877

Site history
- Built: Begun in 12th century
- In use: Until 1944

Garrison information
- Past commanders: Sir Nicholas Wadham (died 1542) Captain of the Isle of Wight, 1509–1520
- Occupants: Isabella de Fortibus, Charles I of England (imprisoned), Princess Beatrice of the United Kingdom

Carisbrooke Castle is a historic motte-and-bailey castle located above, and to the south of, Carisbrooke village centre, on the Isle of Wight, England. Charles I was imprisoned at the castle in the months prior to his trial.

== Early history ==
The site of Carisbrooke Castle may have been occupied in pre-Roman times, but the area surrounding it was certainly a key area for settlement for the Romans. This is evidenced by at least three villas known in the area, suggesting considerable wealth. No Roman occupation of the hilltop itself, though, has been found. A ruined wall suggests that there was a building there in late Roman times. A 6th century cemetery is the earliest direct evidence of human activity on the hill, presumably belonging to a settlement in one of the valleys below the hill. The area is known to have been a relatively well-connected trading hub, evidenced from coins found in a 7th century Saxon settlement.

The Vikings based themselves on the island from 998 to 1009 to make it easier to raid the South coast of England. The local response to this was to build burhs (fortresses) to centralise power in different areas to better resist Viking raids, and provide refuge for the local population. It is likely that Carisbrooke was built as the burh for the Isle of Wight.

After the Norman conquest, the Isle of Wight was granted to William I's cousin William FitzOsbern who probably developed the Saxon burh soon afterwards. The castle is recorded in the Domesday Book of 1086. FitzOsbern's heir rebelled against William I and was deprived of his lands, so Carisbrooke was held directly by the Crown.

== Later history ==
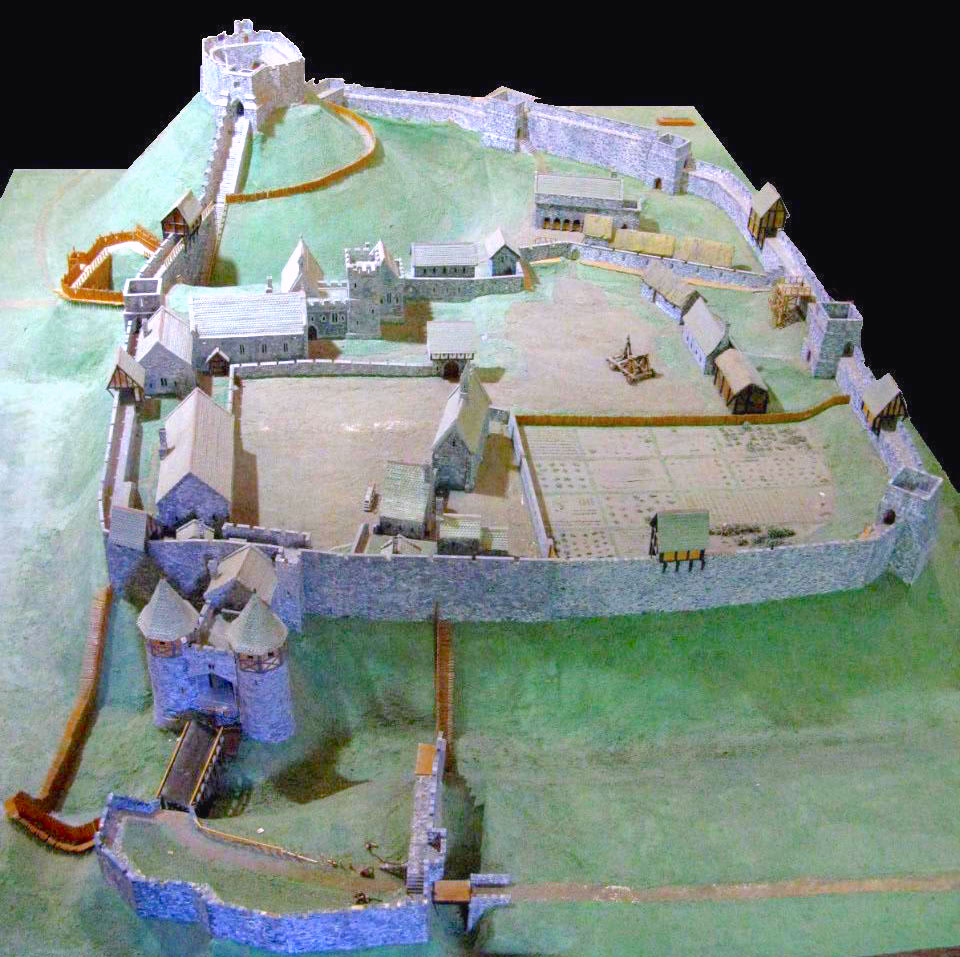
A reconstruction of Carisbrooke Castle during the 14th century

From around 1100 the Isle of Wight, and extensive estates in Devon, were granted to Richard de Redvers by Henry I who feared attacks from his brother Robert Curthose, Duke of Normandy. Richard de Redvers was almost certainly the one who built the motte-and-bailey castle on the site and, over the next two centuries, de Redvers' descendants improved the castle with stone walls, towers and a keep. Richard's son, Baldwin de Redvers, had supoorted Queen Matilda during the Anarchy and lost his lands to Stephen of Blois, only gaining them back in 1153. Carisbrooke stayed in the de Redvers family until 1293 when Countess Isabella, last of the de Redvers family, sold the castle to Edward I on her deathbed. From then on, its governance was entrusted to wardens as representatives of the crown.

During the Hundred Years' War, the Isle of Wight, and thus Carisbrooke Castle, became an important stronghold to control access to the Solent and central-southern England. In 1377, during the reign of Richard II, the island was attacked by the French and the castle was besieged. Sir John Oglander, writing two centuries later, reports that the siege was broken by local hero Peter de Heyno, who shot the French commander. The invaders then agreed to leave after a payment of 1000 marks.

Not much is known of the castle in the late 14th to the early 15th centuries; lords of the island had short tenures and visited infrequently. In 1450 the island's inhabitants petitioned Henry VI to intervene since the castle lacked a garrison and was in a state of general disrepair. The brother-in-law of Edward IV, Anthony Woodville, Lord Scales, later Earl Rivers, obtained a grant of the castle and rights of lordship in 1467. He was responsible for the addition of the Woodville Gate, now known as the Entrance Gate. Woodville was killed by Richard III in 1483, but his brother Edward Woodville, Lord Scales was given control of the castle on the accession of Henry VII in 1485.

Carisbrooke was essentially turned into a munitions store under Henry VIII as he constructed several fortifications around the island to defend from a feared attack from France, which happened in 1545, but left after a short raid. Sir George Carey, later Lord Hunsdon, was appointed captain of the castle in 1583. After the Spanish invasion scare of 1596–97 Carey commissioned the Mantuan engineer Federigo Giambelli (or Genebelli) to make more substantial improvements to the defences. The new fortification was mostly completed by 1600 at the cost of £4,000. After peace was made with Spain in 1604, the pressure to improve the castle's defences simmered away and Carisbrooke seemingly returned to essentially being an arsenal for the rest of the island's defences.

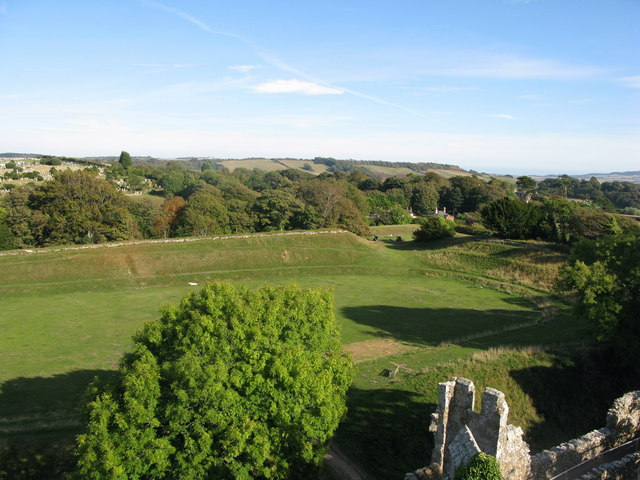
The bowling green used by Charles I during his imprisonment

Almost immediately at the outset of the English Civil War, Carisbrooke was surrendered to Parliament by the island's governor's wife, the Countess of Portland. Philip Herbert, 4th Earl of Pembroke, was appointed governor by Parliament and Carisbrooke was turned into a prison for important political prisoners. King Charles I was imprisoned at Carisbrooke from 22 November 1647 to 6 September 1648, incorrectly believing the new governor, Colonel Robert Hammond, would help him escape. Afterwards, in 1650, two of his children, Prince Henry and Princess Elizabeth, were confined in the castle. Elizabeth died within weeks of getting to Carisbrooke from an illness contracted after playing bowls. Henry stayed at the castle until February 1653, when he was allowed to join his family in exile in France. Other Royalist prisoners were held at Carisbrooke until the Restoration in 1660, when Charles II turned the castle into a prison for Parliamentarians.

The later 17th century saw Carisbrooke decline in significance as other defences in the Isle of Wight became more developed and the Royal Navy became a strong force. Carisbrooke remained an important storage depot for the island, but a plan to build barracks in the 18th century never came to fruition. The castle still remained a residence of the island's governor from time to time, so some buildings were maintained, but, because its military use had faded, the castle morphed into more of a country house.

By the mid-19th century, Carisbrooke had ceased to be a home for the governor and became a tourist attraction. From 1853, Carisbrooke was used as a training ground for the Isle of Wight Artillery Militia, mostly made up of civilians who could be called on to man coastal defences during times of war. In 1856 it was turned over to the Office of Works, with restoration works carried out by Philip Hardwick the same year. Prince Henry of Battenberg was appointed governor in 1894, but died two years later of malaria when returning from the Ashanti War, leaving his title and lands to his wife, Princess Beatrice. Beatrice lived at Carisbrooke from 1913 until her death in 1944. After her death, the hall and Constable's Lodging's became the home to the Carisbrooke Castle Museum. It is now under the control of English Heritage.

In 2007, English Heritage opened a holiday flat inside the castle, in converted former staff quarters. The castle received 100,605 visitors during 2025.

== Description ==
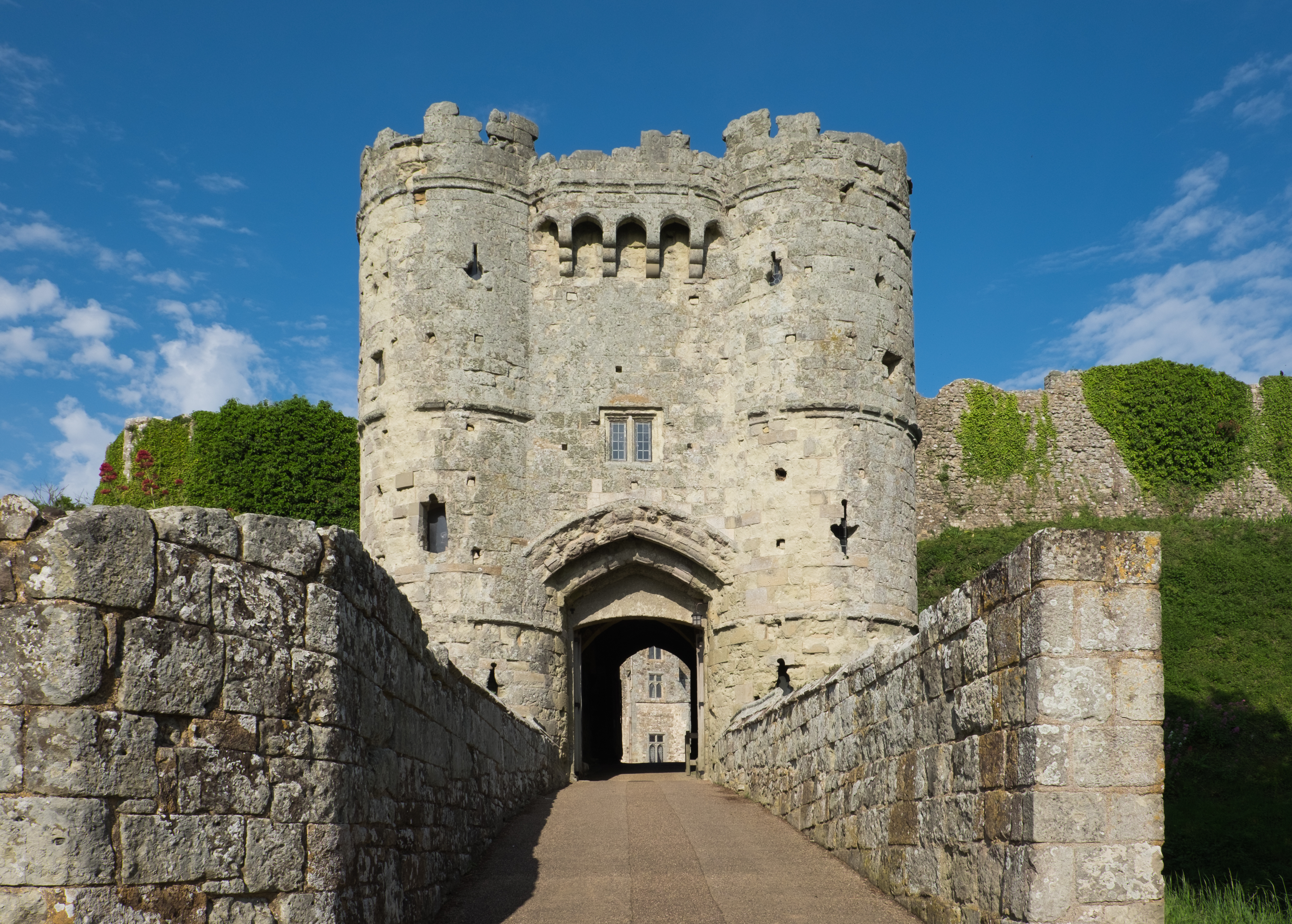
The gatehouse entrance to the castle

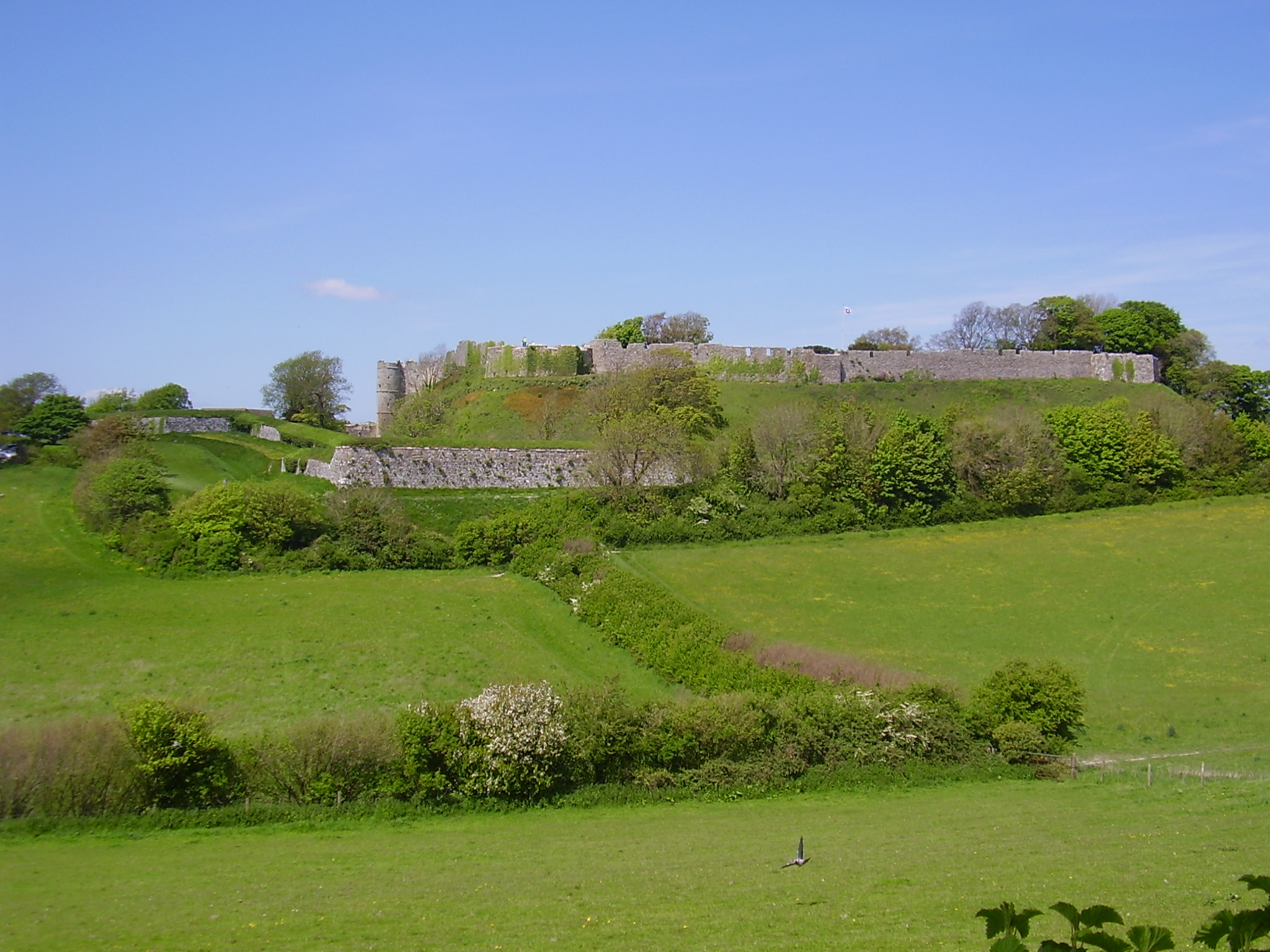
View of the castle from the south

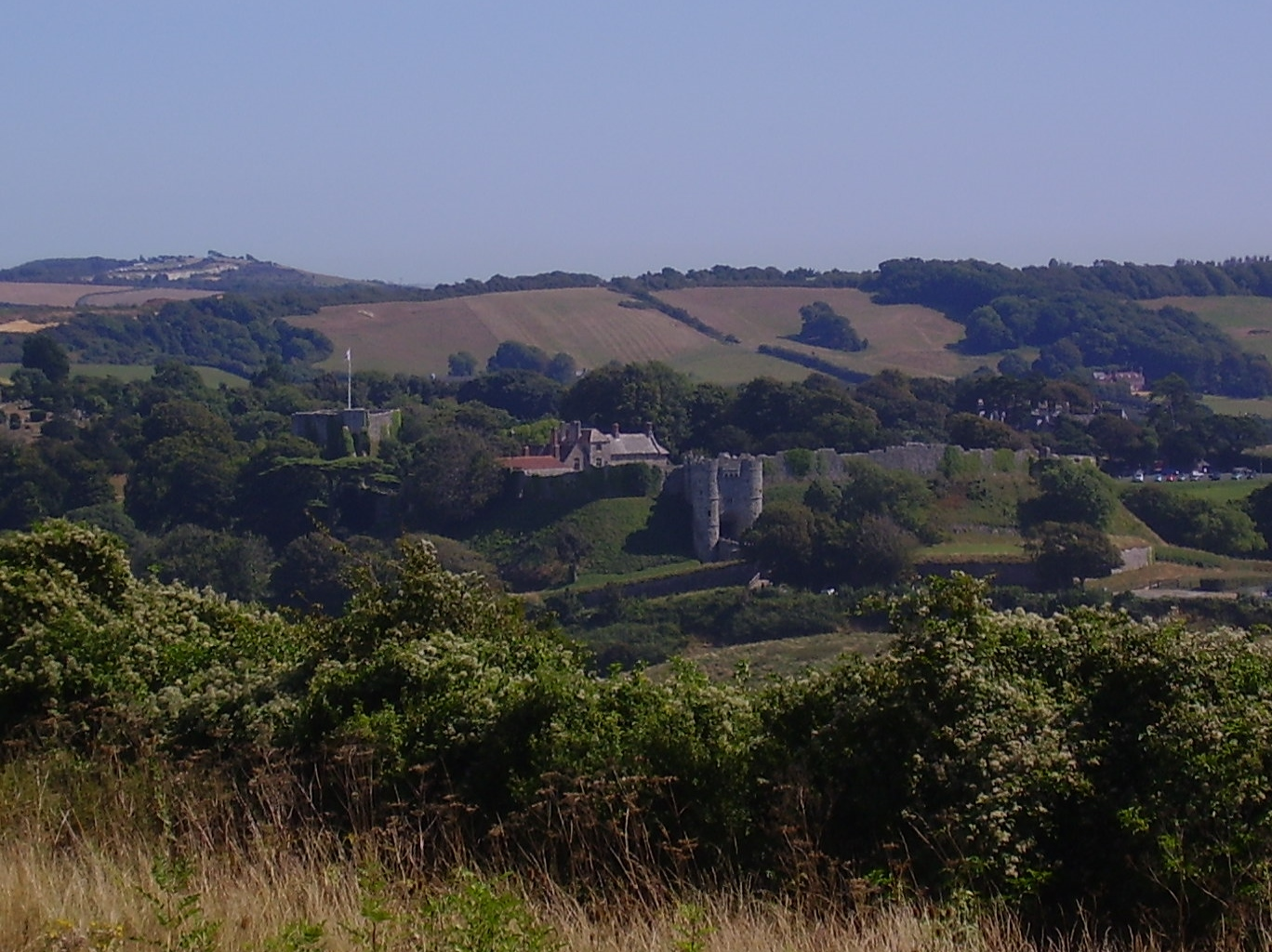
View of the castle from the west

Carisbrooke was the strongest castle on the Island; though it is visible from some distance, it does not dominate the countryside like many other castles.

There are traces of a Roman fort underneath the later buildings. Seventy-one steps lead up to the keep. In the centre of the castle enclosure are the domestic buildings; these are mostly of the 13th century, with upper parts of the 16th century. Some are in ruins, but the main rooms were used as the official residence of the governor of the Isle of Wight until the 1940s, and they remain in good repair.

The Great Hall, Great Chamber and several smaller rooms are open to the public, and an upper room houses the Isle of Wight Museum. Most rooms are partly furnished.

One of the main subjects of the museum is King Charles I. He tried to escape from the castle in 1648 but was unable to get through the bars of his window.

The name of the castle is echoed in a very different structure on the other side of the world. A visit to the castle by James Macandrew, one of the founders of the New Zealand city of Dunedin, led to him naming his estate "Carisbrook". The name of the estate was later used for Dunedin's main sporting venue.

=== Main gate ===
The gateway tower was erected by Lord Scales who was lord of the castle at the time in 1464.

=== Keep ===
The keep was added to the castle in the reign of Henry I, and in the reign of Elizabeth I, when the Spanish Armada was expected, it was surrounded by additional fortifications by Sir George Carey, who had been appointed Governor of the Isle of Wight in 1583.

=== Chapel ===
The chapel is located next to the main gate. In 1904 the chapel of St Nicholas in the castle was reopened and re-consecrated, having been rebuilt as a national memorial of Charles I. Within the walls is a well 200 ft (61 m) deep and another in the centre of the keep is reputed to have been still deeper.

=== The Well-House ===
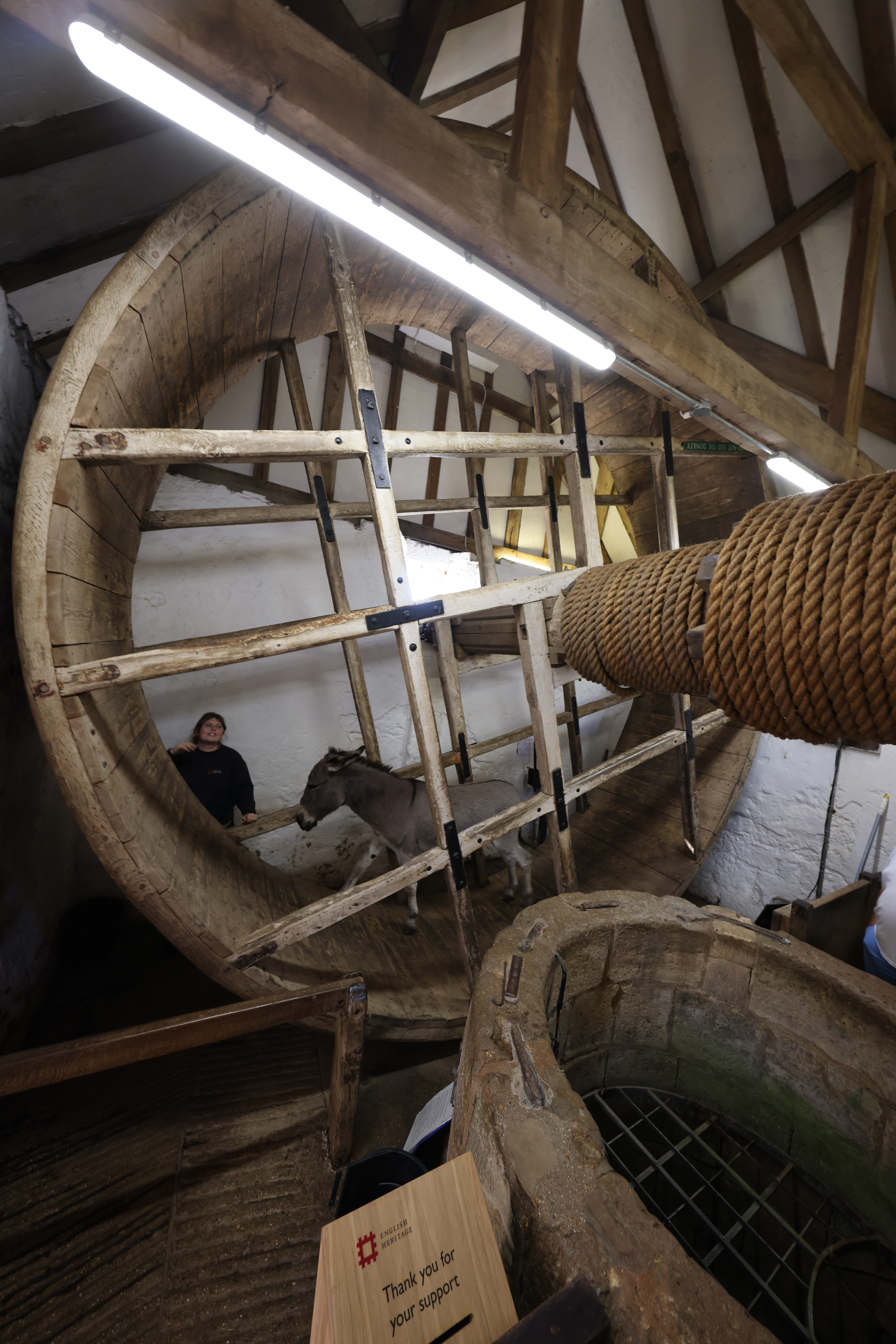
A donkey operating the well

Near the domestic buildings is the well-house with its working donkey wheel. The well is also famous as the hiding place of the Mohune diamond, in the 1898 adventure novel Moonfleet, by J. Meade Falkner. Wyndham Lewis, who lived on the Isle of Wight as a child, cites the donkey wheel at Carisbrooke as an image for the way machines impose a way of life on human beings.

=== Constable's Chamber ===
The Constable's Chamber is a large room located in the castle's medieval section. It was the bedroom of Charles I when he was imprisoned in the castle, and Princess Beatrice used it as a dining room. It is now home to a replica of Charles I's bed, as well as Princess Beatrice's large collection of stag and antelope heads. This room was until recently used as the castle's education centre.

=== Earthworks ===
Surrounding the whole castle are large earthworks, designed by the Italian Federigo Gianibelli, and begun in the year before the Spanish Armada. They were finished in the 1590s. The outer gate has the date 1598 and the arms of Elizabeth I.

== List of constables of Carisbrooke Castle ==
The constable was the officer in charge of the castle.

Name	Dates in office	Source
William Briwere, Jnr	1217	
Waleran Tyes	1224	
Savery de Mauleon	1227	
Bishop of Winchester	1233	
Benedict	1269	
Hugh de Hanneby	1270	
John Hardington	1277	
Humphrey de Dunster	c.1294	
Sir William Russell	?–1307	
Nicholas de Bois	1307/1309?	
John de Langford	1334	
Sir Hugh Tyrrel	1377	
William de Montagu, Earl of Salisbury	1382–1397	
Henry Beaufort, 3rd Duke of Somerset	1457-?	
Anthony Woodville	1467–1483	
Sir Edward Woodville	1485–1488	
Sir Reginald Bray	1495–1503	
Sir Nicholas Wadham (d.1542)	1509–1520	
Thomas Cromwell, 1st Earl of Essex	1520–1538	

== See also ==
- Castles in Great Britain and Ireland
- List of castles in England
