= Robert Scales, 5th Baron Scales =

Robert de Scales
- Born: 1372
- Died: 1402 (aged 29–30)
- Relatives: Roger de Scales, 4th Baron Scales (father)
- Military career
- Allegiance: England

Lord Robert de Scales (1372–1402) was an English nobleman. was involved in an expedition to Aquitaine. He was Commissioner of the Peace for Norfolk from 1399 to 1401, and was the steward of the son and heir of Thomas de Mowbray, 1st Duke of Norfolk due to his minority. He was one of the Peers who voted for Henry Bolingbroke to be crowned King of England. Due to poor health, Robert died at the age of 30 on 7 December 1402.

== Residences ==
Robert held Rivenhall in Essex, Newsells in Hertfordshire, Haslingfield, Cambridgeshire, Wylton in Norfolk and Dalham in Suffolk.

== Family ==
Robert married Elizabeth, daughter of William, 4th Baron Bardolf. They had the following children:-

- Richard de Scales, held Wetherden, Suffolk from 1401 to 1402
- Robert de Scales, 6th Baron Scales (died 1418)
- Lord Thomas de Scales, 7th Baron Scales (1397–1460)

Peerage of England
| Preceded by Roger de Scales | Baron Scales; 1387–1402 | Succeeded by Robert de Scales |
