= Robert Scales, 3rd Baron Scales =

Robert de Scales
- Died: 1369
- Relatives: Robert de Scales, 2nd Baron Scales (father)
- Military career
- Allegiance: England

Sir Robert de Scales was engaged in several military expeditions. In 1337, he went on the Kings Service overseas with Robert d'Ufford, 1st Earl of Suffolk and Peter de Scales (presumably his brother or son). He was summoned to Parliament from 1343 until his death in 1369.

== Residences ==
Robert's main residence was at Rivenhall in Essex but also held Newsells and Berkway in Hertfordshire, Magna Leigh in Essex, Haslingfield in Cambridgeshire, Wrethlington and Tremeleye in Suffolk, Wilton, Barton Bendish, Hickling, Ilsington, Howe, Middleton, Pudding Norton, Gateley, Tylney, Herewych and Reinham in Norfolk and Berton in Gloucestershire.

== Family ==
Robert married Katherine, sister and co-heir of William de Ufford, 2nd Earl of Suffolk, by whom he had three sons and two daughters:

- Peter de Scales, who married Johanna held Wetherden in Suffolk in 1330 and 1346.
- Robert de Scales, who went on the King's service overseas in 1337 with Robert de Ufford, 1st Earl of Suffolk.
- Roger de Scales, 4th Baron Scales (1354–1387).
- Margaret de Scales, who married Sir Robert Howard (-1388), son of Sir John Howard, and had one son Sir John Howard, of Wiggenhall, ancestor of the Dukes of Norfolk.
- Elizabeth de Scales, who married Sir Roger Felbrigg and was buried at St Margaret's Church, Felbrigg.

Peerage of England
Preceded by Robert de Scales	Baron Scales; 1324–1369	Succeeded by Roger de Scales
