= Rivenhall End =

Hamlet in Essex, England

Coordinates: 51.8168°N 0.6662°E

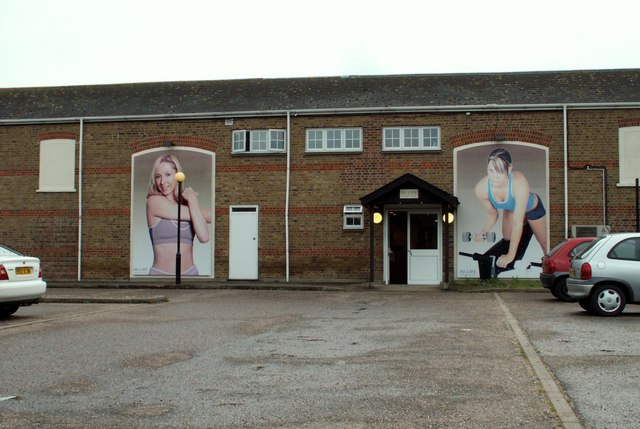
- Hi-Life Health Club

- Location within Essex
- Civil parish: Rivenhall
- District: Braintree
- Shire county: Essex
- Region: East
- Country: England
- Sovereign state: United Kingdom

Rivenhall End is a hamlet in the civil parish of Rivenhall, near Witham, in the Braintree District in the county of Essex, England. It is near the village of Rivenhall. For transport there is the A12 nearby and Witham railway station.
