= Robert Scales, 1st Baron Scales =

Baron Scales

Robert de Scales
- Arms of Robert de Scales, 1st Baron Scales: Gules, six escallops argent, 3,2,1.
- Died: 1304
- Military career
- Allegiance: England
- Conflicts: Welsh Wars, First War of Scottish Independence, France & Flanders
- Awards: Barony

Lord Robert de Scales (died 1304) was a Knight Templar and loyal supporter of Edward I in his campaigns in Wales, Scotland, France and Flanders. In 1299 he, and his heirs, were bestowed with the title, Baron Scales and were henceforth known as 'Lord Scales'. He was a signatory of the Baron's Letter to Pope Boniface VIII in 1301.

== Welsh Invasion ==
In 1277 Robert accompanied Henry de Lacy, Earl of Lincoln, in Edward I's first mass invasion of Wales to quash a rebellion by Llywelyn ap Gruffudd, Prince of Wales. The successful invasion led to the Treaty of Aberconwy, confining Llywelyn's authority to the west of the River Conwy.

== The Continent ==
In March 1287 Robert left England for the English-owned Gascony, however, it was a short stay and by Jun 1287 he had been posted to Wales.

Shortly before April 1298 Robert served in Flanders, perhaps accompanying the king when suing for peace with Philip IV of France.

== Barony ==
In 1299 Robert and his heirs were granted the title Baron Scales and he was summoned to Parliament from 1299-1305.

== Scottish Wars ==
In 1301 Robert, along with one companion, two knights and eleven horsemen, accompanied Edward I on his campaigns against William Wallace in the First War of Scottish Independence.

== Residences ==
Robert's main residence was at Rivenhall (or Rewenhale) in Essex where he held a manor house and park. He also held land at Barkway and Newsells, Hertfordshire, Middelton, Lenn, Herewyk, Reynham, Pudding Norton, Gately, Wilton, la Hawe, Hoo and Ilsington in Norfolk, Haselingfeld in Cambridgeshire, Wridelington in Suffolk, Berton in Gloucestershire and Ouresby and Torneton in Lincolnshire.

== Family ==
Robert married Isabel and they had at least one son

- Robert de Scales, 2nd Baron Scales (?-1324)

Peerage of England
| New creation | Baron Scales; 1299–1304 | Succeeded by Robert de Scales |
