= Robert Scales, 2nd Baron Scales =

Robert de Scales
- Died: 1324
- Relatives: Robert de Scales, 1st Baron Scales (father)
- Military career
- Allegiance: England
- Conflicts: First War of Scottish Independence
- Awards: Knight of the Order of the Bath

Robert de Scales was appointed Knight of the Order of the Bath by Prince Edward whom he accompanied in the Scottish wars and was given an exemption for life from sitting on assizes, juries, etc. against his will. He was summoned to Parliament from 1306 until his death in 1324. He was summoned as a Peer to the Coronation of Edward II on 25 February 1308.

== Residences ==
Robert's main residence was at Rivenhall in Essex but he also held the manors of Lyneford, Hokewold cum Wiltone, Reynham, South Lenn, Middleton, Berton Bynedick, Hoo and Ilsington in Norfolk.

== Family ==
Robert married Egelina (aka Egelma aka Evelina) daughter of Hugh de Courtenay and they had the following children:

- Sir Robert de Scales, 3rd Baron Scales (?-1369)
- Eleanor (d. 1361), married John de Sudeley, 2nd Baron Sudeley (d. 1340)
- Petronella de Scales married Sir John de Boville

Peerage of England
Preceded by Robert de Scales	Baron Scales; 1304–1324	Succeeded by Robert de Scales
