= Peter de Heyno =

Peter de Heyno was the Lord of Stenbury, Isle of Wight under Edward III.

In 1377 a raiding force of French and Castilians invaded the Isle of Wight and burnt Yarmouth and Newtown which he had to defend. They laid siege to Carisbrooke Castle during which Peter de Heyno killed their leader with an arrow from his "silver bow" fired through a loophole in the battlements known as "De Heyno's Loop". The French were defeated in a sally by the defenders led by the commander Sir Hugh Tyrell and withdrew after payment of a bribe.

== Sources ==
- Adrian Searle. Walking Isle of Wight History, Dovecote Press
