= Siege of London (1471) =

Battle during the War of the Roses

Coordinates: 51.654°N 0.197°W

- Part of the Wars of the Roses
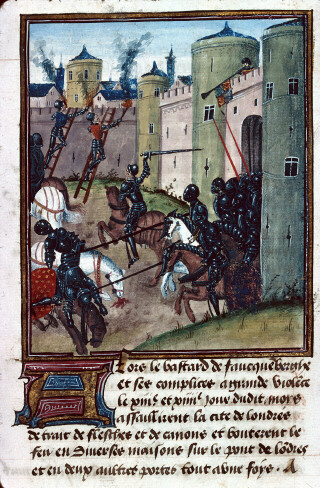
- Yorkist defenders sally from Aldgate (possibly Bishopsgate).
Date	12–15 May 1471
Location	London, England
Result	Yorkist victory

Belligerents
House of York	House of Lancaster

Commanders and leaders
Earl Rivers; Earl of Essex	Thomas Neville

Strength
Approx. 4,500 men	Approx. 5,000 men

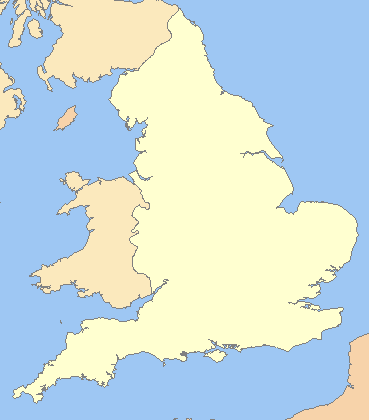
Locations:

– Siege of London; – other battles; – other places

The siege of London was an episode of the Wars of the Roses between 12 and 15 May 1471, in which adherents of the House of Lancaster commanded by Thomas Neville unsuccessfully attempted to storm the city and free King Henry VI, who had been imprisoned in the Tower of London by his rival Edward IV of the House of York. This confrontation, which was an epilogue to the recent battles of Barnet and Tewkesbury, completed the final restoration of Edward IV and ensured the Yorkist hold on the throne.

== Background ==
On 14 March 1471, King Edward IV, of the House of York, who had been in exile in Burgundy since the defection the previous year of his former comrade-in-arms Richard Neville, 16th Earl of Warwick, to the House of Lancaster, disembarked at Ravenspurn, Yorkshire in order to retake the throne from his rival Henry VI. Successfully bypassing the army of Warwick's brother John Neville, Marquess of Montagu, Edward continued on to the town of Warwick, where he proclaimed himself king again, and then to Coventry, where he tried to engage the Earl of Warwick in battle before reinforcements arrived.

Edward IV then headed for London, where he was welcomed with joy on 11 April by the population, which was generally in his favor. He hastened to secure the person of Henry VI, who was locked up in the Tower of London, before reuniting with his wife Elizabeth Woodville and his children, who had taken refuge in the sanctuary of Westminster Abbey since October. Pursued by Warwick's army, Edward faced his opponent at the Battle of Barnet on 14 April. The fighting took place in thick fog, inadvertently causing the Lancastrian troops to attack each other and triggering a rout in which Warwick and Montagu were killed.

Back in London, Edward IV hardly had time to savor his success since he was informed on 16 April of the landing at Weymouth, Dorset of Henry VI's wife, Queen Margaret of Anjou, and their son Edward of Westminster, Prince of Wales, who had been delayed in France by a storm and had not been able to bring reinforcements to Warwick in time: in fact they had landed on the very day of the battle of Barnet. Guessing that Margaret intended to rally reinforcements in Wales, Edward quickly assembled his army and left the command of London to his brother-in-law Anthony Woodville, Earl Rivers.

Delayed at Gloucester by the governor of the city who refused to let her in, Margaret of Anjou was forced to continue her journey northwards in order to cross the River Severn. The Lancastrian army was finally overtaken by the Yorkist army near Tewkesbury and forced to fight there on 4 May. The Battle of Tewkesbury was quickly sealed after the Lancastrians abandoned a strategic height, precipitating a rout in which Prince Edward was killed. On 11 May, Edward IV returned to Coventry where Margaret was brought to him as a captive.

Despite Edward IV's triumph in eliminating or neutralizing the Lancastrian commanders at Barnet and Tewkesbury, many of Henry VI's supporters continued to resist. For example, Jasper Tudor, Earl of Pembroke, still had sufficient support in Wales, and Yorkshire rose against Edward IV after he left to confront Warwick at Coventry.

However, the most dangerous Lancastrian forces were in Kent, where Thomas Neville, a cousin of Warwick, had been tasked since January with patrolling the English Channel to intercept Edward IV's fleet. Before Barnet, Richard Neville had sent his cousin several messages asking him to go to Kent to raise reinforcements on behalf of the House of Lancaster. Unaware of the Lancastrian defeat at Barnet, Thomas Neville landed at Sandwich before 3 May, by which time Edward IV had already been informed. He then had 300 men under his command that Geoffrey Gate had sent him from Calais and was joined by Nicholas Faunt, the Lord mayor of Canterbury, who raised 200 men on his behalf, and others, so that his army quickly grew to nearly 3,000 men. The army recruited by Thomas Neville in Kent was mainly motivated by loyalty to Warwick or Henry VI, but many of the men in it probably joined in the hope of looting the capital.

== Siege of London ==
On 8 May, Thomas Neville was at Sittingbourne, from where he sent a letter to the London authorities asking them to let him enter the capital before he went to confront Edward IV. During the Wars of the Roses, London had let most armies pass through its walls, the only exception being in 1461 when the Lancastrian army led by Margaret of Anjou was denied access after its victory at the Second Battle of St Albans. However, the circumstances were different ten years later, since Thomas Neville's letter arrived in London on 9 May, a few hours after a letter from Edward IV announcing his triumph at Tewkesbury was communicated to the city council. The authorities immediately informed Thomas Neville of their refusal to let him enter the capital, especially as they were mindful of the looting committed by soldiers from Kent during the restoration of the House of Lancaster the previous year, and began to prepare to resist a siege: the banks of the River Thames around the capital were equipped with cannons, while the citizens of the city received weapons. Edward IV was also informed of Neville's uprising and quickly ordered an army to be summoned to defend the capital, so that a week later he found himself with a force of 30,000 men under his command, according to Warkworth's Chronicle.

Despite the council's response, Neville continued on to London. The reason he persisted in a siege was probably the presence of Henry VI in the Tower of London: despite the death of his only son, his release would revive the cause of the House of Lancaster. Arriving at the head of his fleet near the Tower of London on 12 May, Neville organized an attack on London Bridge and ordered his army to attack Southwark. However, this first attack was hardly conclusive and only resulted in the destruction of a bridge in Southwark and the damage of some shops in the St Katherines Precinct, to the east of the Tower of London.

On 13 May, Neville changed tactics and moved further west, from where he intended to attack Kingston Bridge in order to take Westminster. Nevertheless, Earl Rivers had anticipated this maneuver and had his troops patrol the Thames to protect the bridge. Informed of Edward IV's arrival in Coventry, Neville withdrew to Southwark to avoid being caught in a pincer movement and lined up his cannons with the aim of bombarding the Tower of London, where not only Elizabeth Woodville and her children were present, but also Henry VI. In response, Rivers ordered the intensive bombardment of Neville's positions.

The most serious assault occurred on 14 May. On that day, Neville ordered a force of 3,000 men to advance through the densely populated St Katherines Precinct; the force advanced rapidly through the streets, looting shops and setting fire to Bishopsgate. However, reinforcements led by Henry Bourchier, Earl of Essex, came to support the London militia; estimated at 4,500 men, they inflicted many losses on Neville's insurgents and pushed them back from the banks of the Thames, without however preventing them from taking 50 of Gould's butcher's oxen destined for the Tower garrison on their ships.

Other insurgents succeeded in seizing the rampart that the defenders had just built to protect Aldgate; it was only recaptured by the London militia after a pincer assault. Some of the insurgents were trapped behind the portcullis and immediately massacred by the populace, while the others rushed back to their ships.

Meanwhile, Neville removed his cannons from his ships and lined them up on the right bank of the Thames to cover some of his men, who again attacked London Bridge and set fire to the small buildings there, in order to clear a point of entry into the city without having to pass through a gate. Their attack continued as far as the tower guarding the drawbridge but was stopped by the garrison's artillery.

== Lancastrian retreat and surrender ==
On 15 May, Neville returned to Southwark, while some of his troops, pursued by Ralph Josselyn's militia, retreated to Mile End or Stratford, from where they boarded their ships to return to Kent. Other contingents, mainly those involved in the London Bridge attack, regrouped at Blackheath, awaiting instructions from their commander. It is possible that Neville was informed of the imminent arrival of Edward IV's vanguard, who had been warned on 13 May by Henry Percy, Earl of Northumberland, of the collapse of the Yorkshire uprising after the announcement of his victory at Tewkesbury and had dispatched on 14 May 1,500 men from Coventry to support Rivers.

On 18 May, Neville took the direction of Sandwich with 600 men, in order to join his fleet, and ordered the garrison that Calais had sent him to cross the Channel again. The next day, the troops stationed at Blackheath also made their retreat. Having perhaps already begun negotiations with Edward IV, Neville withdrew to Southampton and used his fleet as a bargaining chip. He finally surrendered on 27 May to Richard, Duke of Gloucester, who had been asked to receive his surrender.

== Aftermath ==
On 21 May 1471, Edward IV returned to London with his victorious army and his captive Margaret of Anjou. That same night, Henry VI died suddenly in the Tower, most likely assassinated at the instigation of Edward in order to eliminate any threat from the House of Lancaster, Neville's uprising having no doubt underlined the danger of leaving the deposed king alive.

After knighting the London citizens (including William Hampton, Lord Mayor of London the following year) who had distinguished themselves during the resistance to the siege, Edward did not stay long in London and led an expedition to Kent to pursue the rebels involved in the siege of London. The king's severity was excessive on this occasion: the Lord mayor of Canterbury Nicholas Faunt was sentenced to be hanged, drawn and quartered on 29 May, and many executions or fines were carried out. However, it seems that the Earl of Essex himself was even more severe in Essex.

As for Thomas Neville, he accompanied Richard, Duke of Gloucester, to Middleham Castle in Yorkshire to serve at his side. However, his loyalty to the House of York was quickly called into question and he was beheaded under obscure conditions on 22 September 1471, perhaps after an escape attempt. His head was then displayed next to that of Nicholas Faunt on London Bridge, both looking towards Kent.
