= Anthony Woodville, 2nd Earl Rivers =

English noble, courtier, and writer (c. 1440–1483)

Anthony Woodville
- 2nd Earl Rivers
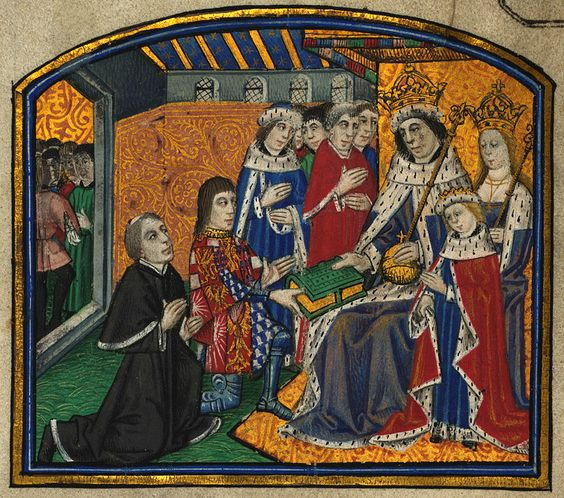
- Anthony Woodville (kneeling, second from left, wearing a tabard displaying his armorials) and William Caxton (dressed in black) presenting the first printed book in English (Dictes and Sayings of the Philosophers) to King Edward IV and Woodville's sister Queen Elizabeth. Lambeth Palace Library, London.

Earl Rivers
- Tenure: 1469–1483
- Predecessor: Richard Woodville, 1st Earl Rivers
- Successor: Richard Woodville, 3rd Earl Rivers
- Born: c. 1440; Grafton Regis, Northamptonshire, Kingdom of England
- Died: 25 June 1483; Pontefract Castle
- Spouse: Elizabeth Scales, 8th Baroness Scales; Mary Fitz-Lewis
- Issue: Margaret Woodville (Illegitimate)
- Father: Richard Woodville, 1st Earl Rivers
- Mother: Jacquetta of Luxembourg

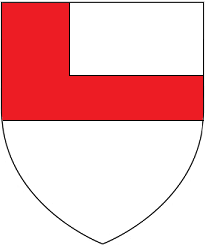
Arms of Woodville: Argent, a fesse and a canton conjoined gules

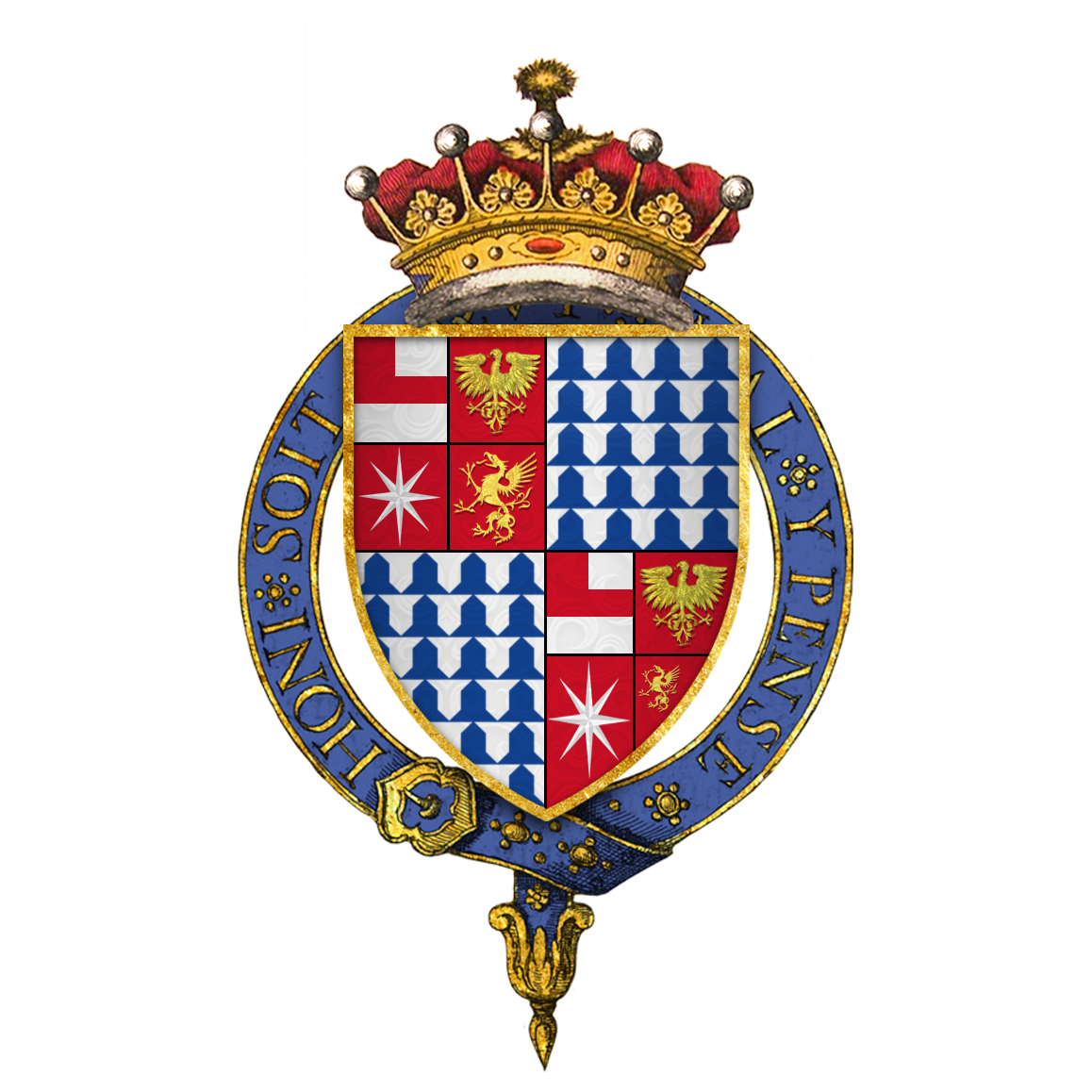
Quartered arms of Sir Anthony Woodville, 2nd Earl Rivers, KG

Anthony Woodville, 2nd Earl Rivers KG (c. 1440 – 25 June 1483), was an English nobleman, courtier, bibliophile and writer. He was the brother of Queen Elizabeth Woodville who married King Edward IV. He was one of the leading members of the Woodville family, which came to prominence during the reign of King Edward IV. After Edward's death, he was arrested and then executed by the Duke of Gloucester (the future King Richard III) as part of a power struggle between Richard and the Woodvilles. His English translation of Dictes and Sayings of the Philosophers was one of the first books printed in England.

== Origins ==
He was the eldest son to survive childhood of Richard Woodville, 1st Earl Rivers, by his wife Jacquetta of Luxembourg. His sister was Elizabeth Woodville, who married King Edward IV and became queen.

== Career ==
Like his father, he was originally a Lancastrian, fighting on that side at the Battle of Towton, but later became a Yorkist. The Woodvilles became very influential at the royal court after his sister Elizabeth Woodville married Edward IV and became queen. Anthony was made a Knight of the Garter. He is known to have been a great tournament champion, and once fought a two-day "duel" with Antoine, bastard of Burgundy.

The supporters of Edward IV were defeated at the Battle of Edgcote, near Banbury, on 24 July 1469, and Richard Woodville and his second son John Woodville were taken prisoners at Chepstow. After a hasty and controversial trial, they were both beheaded at Gosford Green, Coventry on 12 August 1469 and Anthony succeeded his father in the earldom.

=== Career as Earl Rivers ===
He joined the king in his temporary exile in 1470, and returned with him the next year, where he was wounded at the Battle of Barnet. As a result of this battle, Edward IV regained the throne. Whilst in charge of the garrison at the Tower of London, Rivers defeated an attempt by a Lancastrian army (led by Thomas Neville) to capture the city during the Siege of London (1471).

In 1472, Edward IV sent Rivers and his younger brother Edward Woodville to Brittany at the head of 1,000 archers to help the Bretons fend off a threatened French invasion of the duchy. The French withdrew when faced with determined resistance.

In 1473, King Edward IV appointed Rivers Governor of the Prince of Wales' household and Rivers went with the prince to Ludlow Castle. He was also appointed High Sheriff of Caernarvonshire for life. His duties included the administration of justice throughout the principality.

In 1476, the Republic of Venice declared Anthony heir to the Kingdoms of Jerusalem and Cyprus, but his death ended all plans.

== Death and succession ==
When the king died suddenly in 1483, Rivers was ordered by his sister to bring the Prince of Wales, now King Edward V, straight back to London under an armed guard. They were intercepted by Richard, Duke of Gloucester (later King Richard III), who arrested the Earl, along with his nephew Sir Richard Grey, the young king's half-brother. Rivers was imprisoned and then beheaded at Pontefract Castle in West Yorkshire on 25 June 1483 as part of the duke's path towards kingship (as Richard III).

Anthony was succeeded by his brother Richard Woodville, 3rd Earl Rivers. The Scales lands inherited from his wife were bequeathed to his younger brother Edward Woodville, but King Richard III ignored Anthony's wishes as Edward had joined Henry Tudor.

== Marriages ==
He married twice, without legitimate progeny, as follows:

- Firstly to Elizabeth de Scales, suo jure Baroness Scales (d. 1473), daughter and heiress of Thomas de Scales, 7th Baron Scales, and widow of Henry Bourchier, younger son of Henry Bourchier, 1st Earl of Essex. Before succeeding to his father's earldom, Anthony was summoned to Parliament, in right of his wife, as Baron Scales.
- Secondly he married Mary FitzLewis, daughter of Henry FitzLewis.

Edward IV was secretly negotiating for the marriage of Anthony to Margaret of Scotland, but the deaths of Edward and Anthony both in 1483 ended all plans.

=== Mistress and illegitimate progeny ===
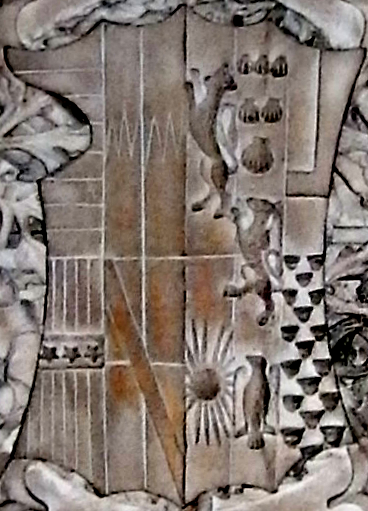
Shield forming ceiling boss of the Poyntz Chapel within the Gaunt's Chapel in Bristol, showing the arms of Poyntz (of 4 quarters) impaling the arms of Woodville (of 6 quarters, 3rd quarter Woodville)

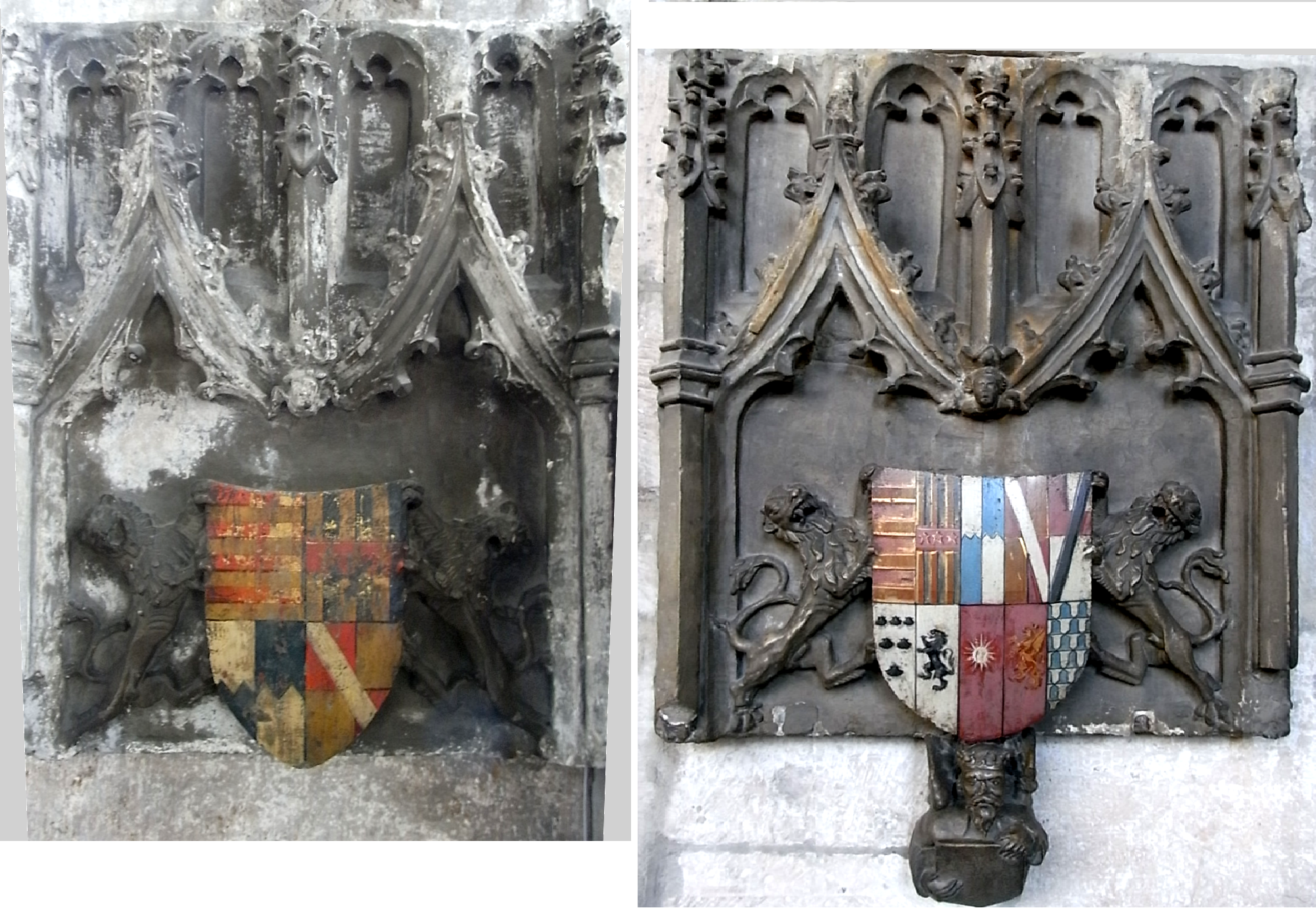
Remnants of chest-tomb of Sir Robert Poyntz (d. 1520) in the Gaunt's Chapel, Bristol, showing heraldry of Poyntz and Woodville. The 5th quarter of the shield at right shows Woodville with a baton sinister for bastardy

By his mistress Gwenlina Stradling, a daughter of William Stradling of St Donat's Castle in Glamorgan, Wales, he had one illegitimate daughter named Margaret, who married Sir Robert Poyntz (d. 1520) lord of the manor of Iron Acton in Gloucestershire, who built the Poyntz Chapel within the Gaunt's Chapel in Bristol. The stone ceiling boss of the Poyntz Chapel displays in relief sculpture the arms of Poyntz (of 4 quarters) impaling the arms of Woodville (of 6 quarters, 3rd quarter Woodville), and the two wooden end-panels of his monumental coffin, decorated with the heraldry of Poyntz and Woodville, survive in the Gaunt's Chapel in which he was buried. The Heraldic Visitation of Gloucestershire records that:

"A testimony of this match apereth by indenture of covenant of the mariag yett extant under the hand and seale of the said Erle, by letters written by the hand of the reverend ffather Morton, Cardinall, also by the armes of the Erle impaled w(i)th Poyntz on the top of a Chappell near Bristowe where they lye buried".

== Literary interests ==
Rivers had met the earliest English printer William Caxton when in exile in Bruges, and there in 1475–76 Caxton published Cordyale, or Four last thinges, Rivers' English translation from the French of Jean Miélot of Les quattres choses derrenieres, itself a translation of the Cordiale quattuor novissimorum. After both of them had returned to England, one of the first, if not the first, books printed in England was Rivers' translation from French of the Dictes and Sayings of the Philosophers, printed by Caxton at Westminster in 1477. Lambeth Palace Library has a manuscript illustration showing Rivers presenting a copy of this book to Edward IV (illustrated top right).

== Notes ==
Political offices
| Preceded by John Stafford, 1st Earl of Wiltshire | Chief Butler of England; 1473–1483 | Succeeded by Francis Lovell, 1st Viscount Lovell |
Peerage of England
| Preceded by Richard Woodville, 1st Earl Rivers | Earl Rivers; 1469–1483 | Succeeded by Richard Woodville, 3rd Earl Rivers |
