= John Woodville =

English nobleman and knight (c. 1445–1469)

Sir John Woodville KB (c. 1445 – 12 August 1469) was the third son and seventh child of Richard Woodville, 1st Earl Rivers, and Jacquetta of Luxembourg.

== Marriage ==
In January 1465, Woodville's sister, Elizabeth, queen consort of King Edward IV of England, procured his marriage to Katherine Neville, Dowager Duchess of Norfolk, who was aunt to the powerful Richard Neville, Earl of Warwick. As the duchess was about 65 years of age at the time and Woodville was only 19, the marriage was seen by all, particularly Warwick, as an indecent grasp for money and power by the Woodville family. One chronicler described it as a "maritagium diabolicum" (the diabolical marriage). The same year, Woodville was made a Knight of the Bath by his brother-in-law, the king.

== Warwick's rebellion ==
In 1469, Woodville and his father accompanied the king on a march north to put down what was thought to be a minor rebellion supporting Edward's brother, the Duke of Clarence, as the legitimate king. Before they met the rebels, both Clarence and Warwick announced their support for the rebellion; by the time the king met the rebels, the rebel force was far stronger than his. In a parley, the rebels told the king that they had no fight with him, but advised him to distance himself from the Woodvilles. In no position to argue, the king sent the Woodville party away.

== Capture and execution ==
Woodville and Rivers went first to the Rivers house at Grafton and from there made their way west towards Wales. They were captured by Warwick's men on the western bank of the Severn and taken to Coventry in Warwickshire. Before leaving Calais to support the uprising, Warwick had published a manifesto citing the Woodvilles in general and the earl and John Woodville specifically as his reason for supporting Clarence against the king. The publication of this manifesto was deemed by Warwick to justify the execution of Rivers and his son. They were beheaded on 12 August at Kenilworth and their heads placed on spikes above the gates of Coventry. Woodville died childless.

== Sources ==
- The Princes in the Tower by Elizabeth Jenkins
