= Richard Woodville, 1st Earl Rivers =

English nobleman and knight (1405–1469)

Richard Woodville
- Earl Rivers; Knight of the Garter
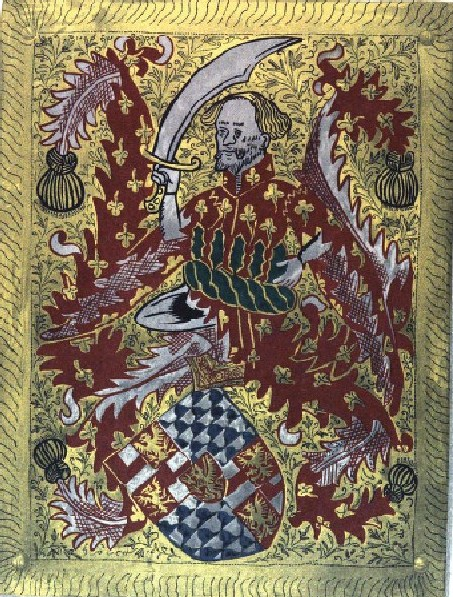
- Sir Richard Woodville depicted on the Order of the Garter Stall Plate in St. George’s Chapel, Windsor
- Born: 1405
- Died: 12 August 1469 (aged 63 or 64)
- Spouse: Jacquetta of Luxembourg (m. 1437)
- Issue: Elizabeth Woodville, Queen of England; Anne Woodville, Viscountess Bourchier; Anthony Woodville, 2nd Earl Rivers; Mary Woodville, Countess of Pembroke; Jacquetta Woodville, Baroness Strange of Knockin; Sir John Woodville; Richard Woodville, 3rd Earl Rivers; Eleanor Woodville, Lady Grey; Lionel Woodville, Bishop of Salisbury; Margaret Woodville, Countess of Arundel; Edward Woodville, Lord Scales; Katherine Woodville, Duchess of Buckingham
- Father: Richard Wydeville
- Mother: Joan Bittlesgate

Richard Woodville, 1st Earl Rivers KG (1405 – 12 August 1469), contemporarily spelt Wydeville, was the father of Elizabeth Woodville and father-in-law of Edward IV.

== Early life ==
Born at Maidstone in Kent, Richard Woodville was the son of Richard Wydeville (Woodville), chamberlain to the Duke of Bedford, and Joan Bittlesgate (or Bedlisgate), the daughter of Thomas Bittlesgate of Knightstone in the parish of Ottery St Mary in Devon. He was also a grandson of John Wydeville who was Sheriff of Northamptonshire (in 1380, 1385, 1390).

== Marriage and courtly career ==
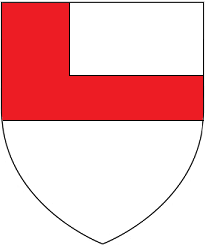
Arms of Woodville: Argent, a fesse and a canton conjoined gules

Woodville followed his father into service with the Duke of Bedford. In 1433 the Duke had married the 17-year-old Jacquetta of Luxembourg; she was the Duke's second wife and he was significantly older and in ill health. She was required to seek permission from King Henry VI before she could remarry, but in March 1437 it was revealed that she had secretly married Richard Woodville who was far below her in rank and not considered a suitable husband for the lady still honoured as the king's aunt. The couple were fined £1000, but the sum was remitted in October of the same year.

Despite this inauspicious start, the married couple soon prospered, thanks mainly to Jacquetta's continuing prominence within the royal family. She retained her rank and dower as Duchess of Bedford, which initially provided an income of between £7000 and £8000 per year, though over the years this amount diminished as a result of territorial losses in France and collapsing royal finances in England. Richard Woodville was honoured with military ranks, in which he proved himself a capable soldier.

Further honours for both came when Henry VI married Margaret of Anjou, whose uncle was Jacquetta's brother-in-law (Jacquetta's sister Isabelle married Margaret of Anjou's paternal uncle Charles du Maine). The Woodvilles were among those chosen to escort the bride to England, and the family benefited further through this double connection to the royal family. Sir Richard was raised to the rank of Baron Rivers in 1448. Therefore their children grew up enjoying considerable privilege and material comfort.

== Military career ==
Woodville was a captain in 1429, served in France in 1433 and was a knight of the regent Duke of Bedford in 1435. He was at Gerberoy in 1435 and served under William de la Pole, Duke of Suffolk, in 1435–36. He then fought under the Duke of Somerset and the Earl of Shrewsbury in 1439 and the Duke of York in 1441–42, when he was made captain of Alençon and knight banneret.

Woodville was created Baron Rivers by King Henry VI on 9 May 1448. Two years later, as Sir Richard, he was invested as a Knight of the Garter in 1450. He was appointed seneschal of Gascony in 1450 (but failed to reach it before its fall) then lieutenant of Calais in 1454–55. He was appointed Warden of the Cinque Ports in 1459 to defend Kent against invasion by the Yorkist earls (but was captured at Sandwich).

In the Wars of the Roses, he was initially a Lancastrian, but he became a Yorkist when he thought that the Lancastrian cause was lost. He reconciled himself to the victorious Edward IV, his future son-in-law. On 1 May 1464, Edward married Rivers' daughter Elizabeth, widow of Lancastrian knight Sir John Grey. Richard Woodville was created Earl Rivers in 1466, appointed Lord Treasurer in March 1466 and Constable of England on 24 August 1467.

== Later career ==
The power of this new family was very distasteful to the old baronial party, and especially so to the Earl of Warwick. Rivers was regarded as a social upstart, and in an ironical episode, his future son-in-law in 1460, while accepting his submission, had rebuked him for daring, given his lowly birth, to fight against the House of York. The Privy Council, in its horrified response to the King's marriage, said bluntly that Richard Woodville's low social standing in itself meant that the King must surely know "that Elizabeth was not the wife for him". Early in 1468, the Rivers estates were plundered by Warwick's partisans, and the open war of the following year was aimed at destroying the Woodvilles. After the Yorkist defeat at the Battle of Edgcote on 24 July 1469, Rivers and his third son John were taken prisoners at Chepstow. They were later beheaded at Coventry on 12 August 1469.

Richard Woodville's eldest surviving son Anthony succeeded him in the earldom.

Lord Rivers had a large family. His fourth son, Lionel (d. 1484) became the Bishop of Salisbury. All his daughters made great marriages: Katherine Woodville, his eighth daughter, was the wife of Henry Stafford, 2nd Duke of Buckingham.

"Woodville" is the modern spelling of the name: in their own time "Wydeville", "Wydville" and other variants were used.

== Issue ==
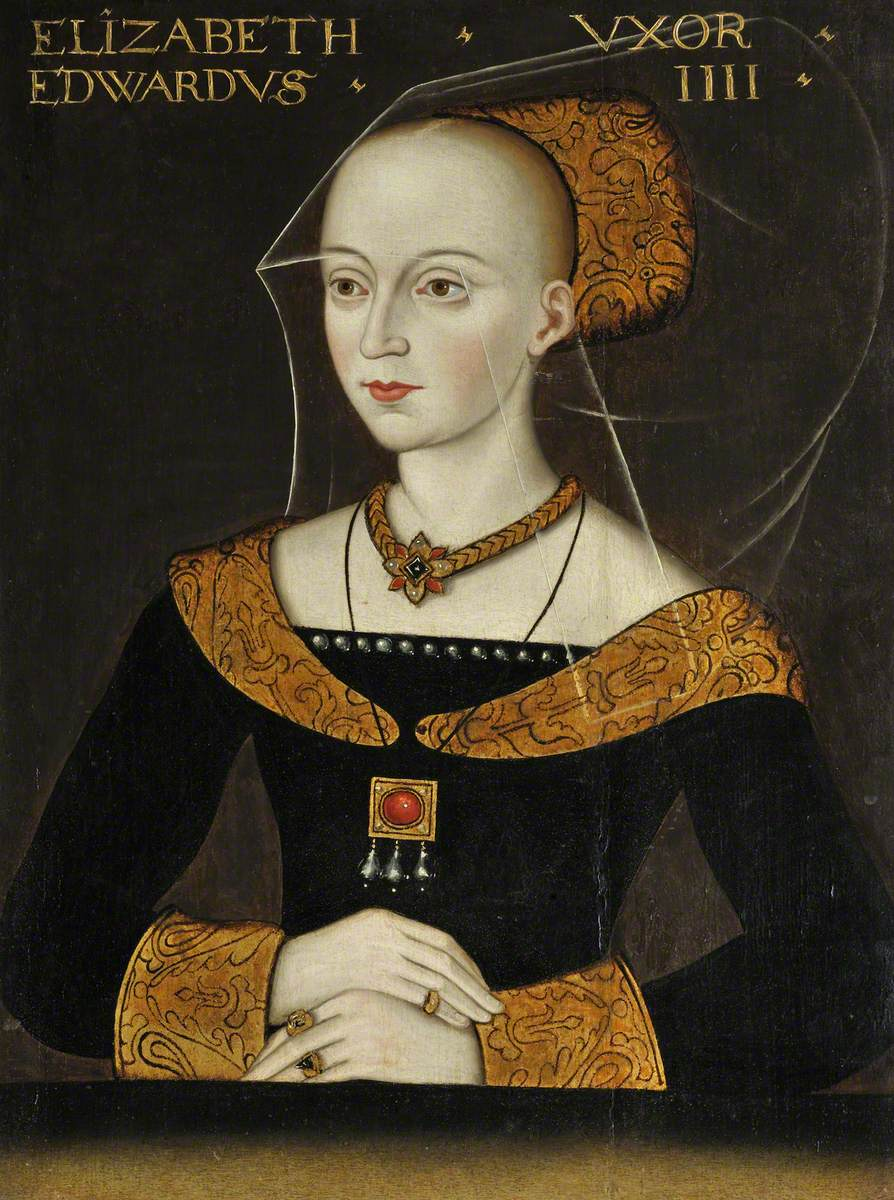
Elizabeth Woodville

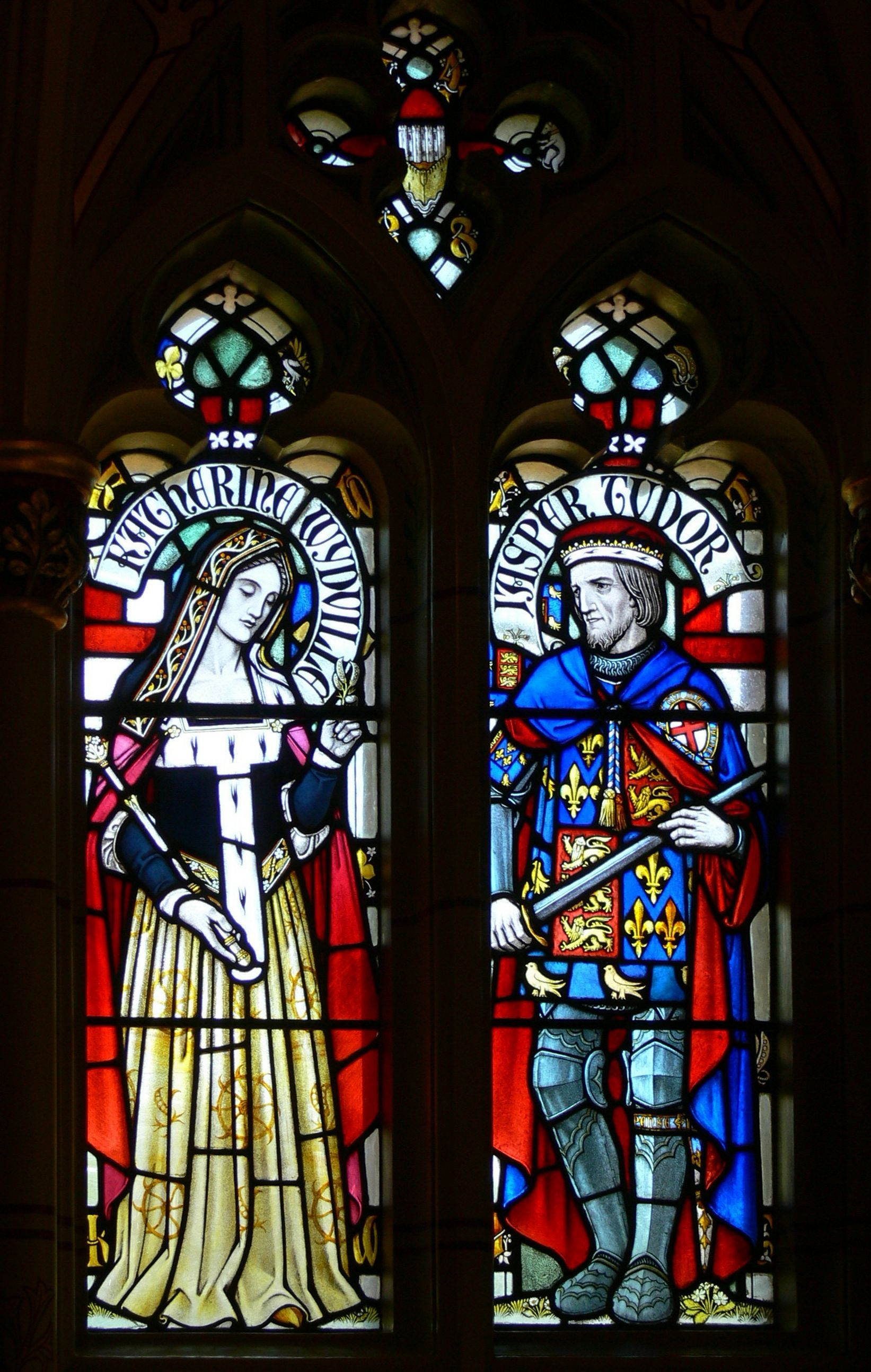
Katherine Woodville (left) and her second husband Jasper Tudor, Duke of Bedford on stained glass windows in Cardiff Castle.

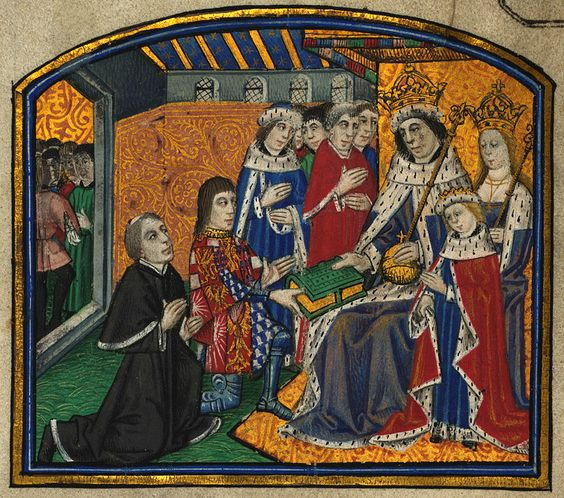
Anthony Woodville (kneeling, second from left, wearing a tabard displaying his armorials) and William Caxton (dressed in black) presenting the first printed book in English (Dictes and Sayings of the Philosophers) to King Edward IV and Woodville's sister Queen Elizabeth. Lambeth Palace Library, London.

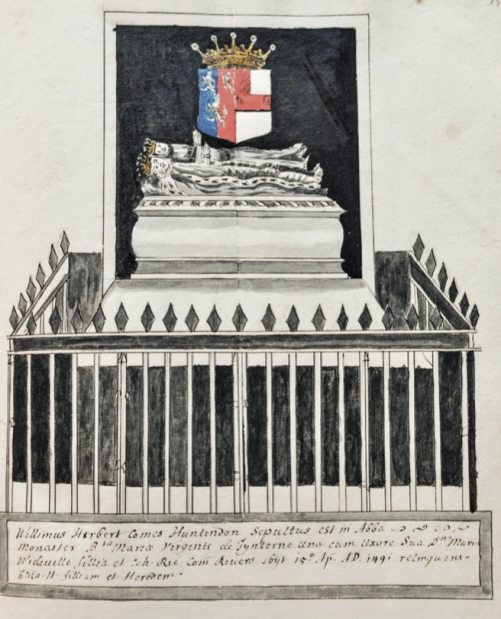
Mary Woodville's tomb, where she is buried next to her husband William Herbert, 2nd Earl of Pembroke at Tintern Abbey, Chapel Hill.

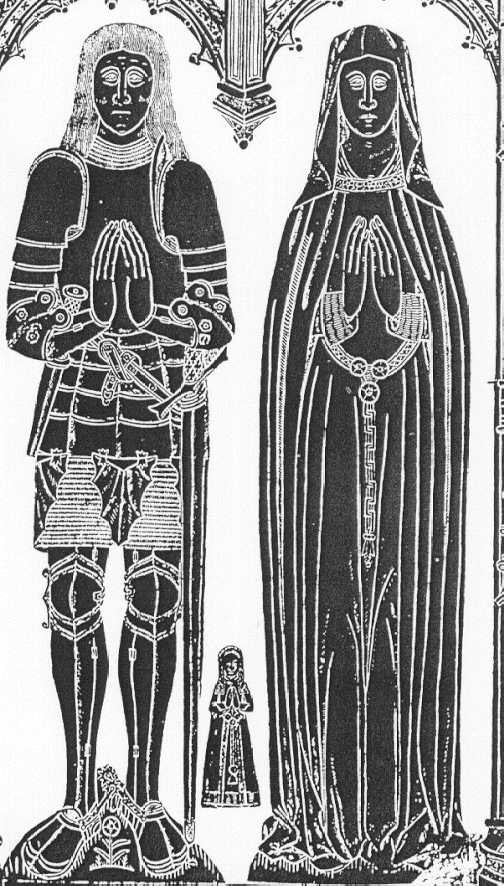
Memorial brass of Jacquetta le Strange (née Woodville), and John, 8th Baron le Strange. Both buried in St John's Church, Hillingdon, Middlesex.

Richard and Jacquetta had 14 children:

- Elizabeth Woodville (c. 1437 – 1492), married first Sir John Grey of Groby, and second Edward IV of England.
- Lewis Woodville (c. 1438–1450), died in childhood.
- Anne Woodville (1439–1489), married first William Bourchier, Viscount Bourchier, and second George Grey, 2nd Earl of Kent.
- Anthony Woodville, 2nd Earl Rivers (1442–1483), married Elizabeth Scales, 8th Baroness Scales.
- Mary Woodville (1443–1481), married William Herbert, 2nd Earl of Pembroke.
- John Woodville (1445–1469), married Katherine Neville, Dowager Duchess of Norfolk.
- Jacquetta Woodville, Baroness Strange of Knockin (1445-1509), married John le Strange, 8th Baron Strange of Knockin.
- Lionel Woodville (1447–1484), Bishop of Salisbury.
- Martha Woodville (d. c. 1500), married Sir John Bromley of Baddington.
- Eleanor Woodville (1452–1512), married Sir Anthony Grey, son of Edmund Grey, 1st Earl of Kent.
- Richard Woodville, 3rd Earl Rivers (1453–1491).
- Margaret Woodville (1454–1490), married Thomas FitzAlan, 10th Earl of Arundel.
- Edward Woodville, Lord Scales (d. 1488), soldier and courtier.
- Katherine Woodville (c. 1458 – 1497), married first Henry Stafford, 2nd Duke of Buckingham, second Jasper Tudor, Duke of Bedford, she married third Sir Richard Wingfield.

Robert Glover, Somerset Herald, noted another 'Richard' who would seem to have been born before Richard the 3rd Earl. A 'Richard Woodville, esquire for the body' was present at the christening of Prince Arthur (son of Elizabeth of York and Henry VII) on 24 September 1486 in Winchester Cathedral; Arthur's grandmother, Elizabeth Woodville, served as his godmother, and her younger brother Edward was also present at the ceremony.

The Visitation of Buckinghamshire of 1566 mentions the marriage of William Dormer of Wycombe (only later of Ascott House) to "Agnes, da. of Sir Richard Woodvyle, Erle Ryvers" but does not say whether the father was the first or the third earl, who the mother was or whether Agnes was legitimate. Considering though that she is thought to be born about 1458 the more likely candidate for her father is the senior Richard Woodville.

== In fiction ==
Woodville is a primary character in Philippa Gregory's 2011 novel about Jacquetta of Luxembourg, The Lady of the Rivers. In The White Queen television series, he is portrayed by Robert Pugh.

Political offices
Preceded by Humphrey Stafford, 1st Duke of Buckingham	Lord Warden of the Cinque Ports; 1459–1460	Succeeded by Richard Neville, 16th Earl of Warwick
Preceded by John Tiptoft, 1st Earl of Worcester	Lord High Constable; 1467–1469	Succeeded by Richard, Duke of Gloucester
Preceded by Walter Blount, 1st Baron Mountjoy	Lord High Treasurer; 1466–1469	Succeeded by John Langstrother
Peerage of England
New creation	Earl Rivers; 1466–1469	Succeeded by Anthony Woodville
New creation	Baron Rivers; 1448–1469	Succeeded by Anthony Woodville
