= Robert Scales, 6th Baron Scales =

Robert de Scales
- Died: 1418
- Military career
- Allegiance: England

Robert de Scales (c. 1395–1418) died unmarried, and at an early age, and was succeeded by his brother Thomas. On 8 May 1410 an order to seize Robert and deliver him to the Treasurer of England was issued.

Peerage of England
Preceded by Robert de Scales	Baron Scales; 1402–1418	Succeeded by Thomas de Scales
