= Richard Woodville, 3rd Earl Rivers =

English noble (1453–1491)

Richard Woodville
- 3rd Earl Rivers

Earl Rivers
- Tenure: 1483–1491
- Predecessor: Anthony Woodville, 2nd Earl Rivers
- Successor: none
- Born: 1453; Grafton Regis, Northamptonshire, Kingdom of England
- Died: 6 March 1491 (aged 37–38)
- Father: Richard Woodville, 1st Earl Rivers
- Mother: Jacquetta of Luxembourg

Richard Woodville, 3rd Earl Rivers (1453 – 6 March 1491) succeeded his brother, Anthony Woodville, as the third Earl Rivers. He was the son of Richard Woodville, 1st Earl Rivers, and Jacquetta of Luxembourg. Richard was the brother of the English queen Elizabeth Woodville.

== Youth ==
Richard was born in 1453. During the Readeption of Henry VI in 1470, he might have accommodated himself to the short-lived restoration of the Lancastrian regime, as Richard was pardoned by King Edward IV, the husband of his sister Elizabeth, on his return to power in 1471. Unlike his older brother Anthony, however, he was not given any special favours under Edward. J. R. Lander states that he was employed in a minor capacity on "various embassies and commissions".

== As Earl Rivers ==
When Richard III executed Richard's brother Anthony and seized the throne, Richard Woodville became Earl Rivers. The king confiscated Richard's lands but did not otherwise persecute him. Richard seems to have participated in some way in Buckingham's rebellion in 1483, as he was attainted in that year. However, he was later pardoned. It is not known whether or not he joined Henry Tudor in 1485, but after Henry's victory, his estates were restored. He served in a local capacity in Hereford, Bedfordshire and Northamptonshire, but never held any major office.

Richard Woodville was the last of his family to hold the title of Earl Rivers. He died unmarried and the earldom became extinct. The estates attached to the earldom reverted to the crown. His personal lands were bequeathed to his nephew Thomas Grey, 1st Marquess of Dorset.

Peerage of England
Preceded by Anthony Woodville	Earl Rivers; 1483–1491	Extinct
