= Thomas Neville (died 1471) =

15th-century English soldier and sailor

- Viscount Fauconberg
- Born: 1429
- Died: 22 September 1471 (aged 42); Middleham Castle, Yorkshire
- Noble family: Neville
- Father: William Neville, 1st Earl of Kent

Thomas Fauconberg or Thomas Neville, sometimes called Thomas the Bastard, or the Bastard of Fauconberg (1429 – 22 September 1471), was the natural son of William Neville, Lord Fauconberg, who was a leading commander in the Hundred Years' War and, until joining his cousin, Richard Neville ("Warwick the Kingmaker") in rebellion on the Lancastrian side against another cousin, Edward IV, served on the Yorkist side in the Wars of the Roses.

== Early life ==
In his youth Thomas was a notable sailor, receiving the freedom of the City of London in 1454 for his work in eliminating pirates from the English Channel and the North Sea. In this he was closely associated with his father's relatives: Lord Fauconberg's elder brother, Richard Neville, Earl of Salisbury was a commissioner for the keeping of the seas in 1453–1455, and in 1455 Salisbury's eldest son Richard Neville, Earl of Warwick, was entrusted with sole responsibility for the keeping of the seas, a post he effectively retained for the rest of his life.

== The Wars of the Roses ==
The Nevilles were the most important supporters of Richard of York, and instrumental in helping his son gain the throne as Edward IV in 1461, assistance for which Lord Fauconberg was rewarded with the title of Earl of Kent. When he died in 1463 without a legitimate male heir, the barony of Fauconberg fell into abeyance between his three daughters: Joan, Alice and Elizabeth.

In the late 1460s, Thomas continued to back his cousin the Earl of Warwick when tensions arose between Warwick and Edward IV. When Warwick rebelled and was forced into exile in 1470, Thomas joined him with several armed ships. While Warwick was in France negotiating an alliance with the Lancastrian leader Margaret of Anjou, Thomas took command of his cousin's ships and raided English shipping.

In 1471 Thomas was back at sea for the Lancastrians, serving under Warwick in defence of the government of Henry VI, who had regained the throne with the Nevilles' help in 1470. He was directed to patrol the Channel between Dover and Calais to intercept Edward IV, who had fled to Burgundy. Edward avoided the Lancastrian fleet and landed at Ravenspur in Yorkshire. Warwick ordered the Bastard to return from the sea and raise the county of Kent, where Warwick enjoyed great popularity with the discontented inhabitants. However, before these reinforcements could intervene, Edward occupied London, took Henry VI prisoner, and defeated and killed Warwick in the Battle of Barnet on 14 April.

With his cousin dead, Thomas landed at Sandwich, sending his ships to sail around Kent and up the Thames Estuary. He himself advanced over land towards London, gathering troops as he went, and received notable support from Canterbury and its mayor Nicholas Faunt. Edward meanwhile headed west to oppose the Lancastrian army advancing from the West Country. On 4 May he triumphed in the Battle of Tewkesbury, killing Edward, Prince of Wales, Edmund Beaufort, Duke of Somerset, and John Beaufort, the duke's younger brother, and capturing the Queen, Margaret of Anjou. Unaware of these events, Thomas reached Southwark, and on 14 May wrote to the city government of London, asking to be allowed to bring his men into the city. They refused, and he responded by burning Southwark.

When London still refused him entrance he prepared a three-pronged assault on the city. He removed the artillery from the ships and placed it on the south bank of the Thames so that he could bombard the city. Most of the Bastard's army was sent upstream to cross the river and come back to attack London at Aldgate and Bishopsgate. A third party would try to cross London Bridge.

His assault ultimately failed. His bombardment failed to weaken the will of the London defenders, and the assault at London Bridge was beaten back by the fire of artillery placed by the Londoners at their end of the bridge. The attack on Bishopsgate was disrupted by the Earl of Essex, who arrived as it was under way. The party that had the most success was the one at Aldgate, which managed to force the gate open but was beaten back by the defenders' counterattack. Pursued, the Bastard and his army retreated as far as Stratford and Blackwall, where they boarded the ships and crossed back into Kent.

He then made his way westward to Kingston upon Thames to oppose Edward IV. Edward Woodville, Lord Scales, who held London for Edward, recognized the king's danger, for the Bastard's army was estimated at twenty thousand men, and recruits were stated to be still coming in. Woodville sent word to the Bastard that Edward IV was quitting England, and thus induced him to return to Blackheath. From there Thomas journeyed with six hundred horsemen via Rochester to Sandwich, where he learned that the Lancastrian cause was lost. Edward IV marched on Sandwich and captured thirteen ships with most of the Bastard's immediate followers. Thomas himself escaped to Southampton, where the King took him prisoner. The King was so thankful to the aldermen of London, that he knighted the mayor, the recorder and other aldermen including Sir William Hampton, the following year's Lord Mayor of London.

== Death ==
He was then taken to Middleham Castle in Yorkshire, the principal seat of his Neville relatives, and beheaded on 22 September 1471. His head was set on London Bridge, 'looking into Kentward'. A brother is stated to have been a prisoner at the same time, but he managed to take sanctuary at Beverley.
