= Elizabeth Scales, 8th Baroness Scales =

15th-century English noble

Elizabeth Woodville, Countess Rivers and 8th Baroness Scales (died 2 September 1473), born Elizabeth de Scales, was the sole heir of Thomas Scales, 7th Baron Scales.

== Family ==
Elizabeth first married Henry Bourchier (d. 1462), second son of Henry Bourchier, 1st Earl of Essex. Her second marriage to Anthony Woodville, 2nd Earl Rivers produced no children. The earl was a sibling of Elizabeth Woodville, queen consort of Edward IV. He became Lord Scales in his wife's right, and was summoned to Parliament by that title.

After Elizabeth died in 1473, Anthony married a daughter of Henry FitzLewis named Mary, but remained without legitimate issue. He was later beheaded by order of Richard III due to the threat he posed to Richard usurping from the crown from Anthony's nephew, Edward V, at Pontefract on 25 June 1483, but did leave a will.

The lands attached to the Rivers title were inherited by Anthony's brother, Richard Woodville, 3rd Earl Rivers. The Barony of Scales went to his youngest brother, Edward Woodville, but Richard III ignored this provision and the title fell into abeyance. In 1485, John de Vere, 13th Earl of Oxford and William Tynedale became heirs to the Scales' estate.

Peerage of England
Preceded by Thomas de Scales	Baroness Scales; 1460 – 1473	Succeeded by Anthony Woodville
