= Rivenhall =

Village and civil parish in Essex, England

Coordinates: 51°50′N 0°40′E

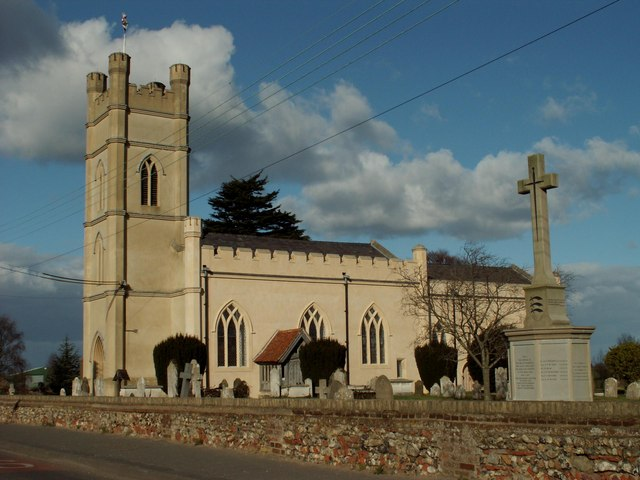
- St Mary and All Saints' church

- Location within Essex
- Area: 9.386 km^{2} (3.624 sq mi)
- Population: 757 (Parish, 2021)
  - Density: 81/km^{2} (210/sq mi)
- Civil parish: Rivenhall
- District: Braintree
- Shire county: Essex
- Region: East
- Country: England
- Sovereign state: United Kingdom

Rivenhall is a village and civil parish near Witham in the Braintree district of Essex, England. As well as the small village of Rivenhall itself, the parish also includes Rivenhall End and surrounding rural areas. At the 2021 census the parish had a population of 757.

It has a primary school called Rivenhall Church of England School. For transport there is the busy A12 nearby and Witham railway station.

== History ==
A Roman villa existed at Rivenhall. Its site was subsequently used for an Anglo-Saxon hall and adjoining parish church. A timber church is known to have existed by the 10th century; it was rebuilt in stone in the late 10th century or early 11th century. The church, dedicated to St Mary and All Saints, is now a Grade I listed building.

Rivenhall had an airfield during the Second World War called RAF Rivenhall. It opened in 1943 and closed after the war in 1946.

== Governance ==
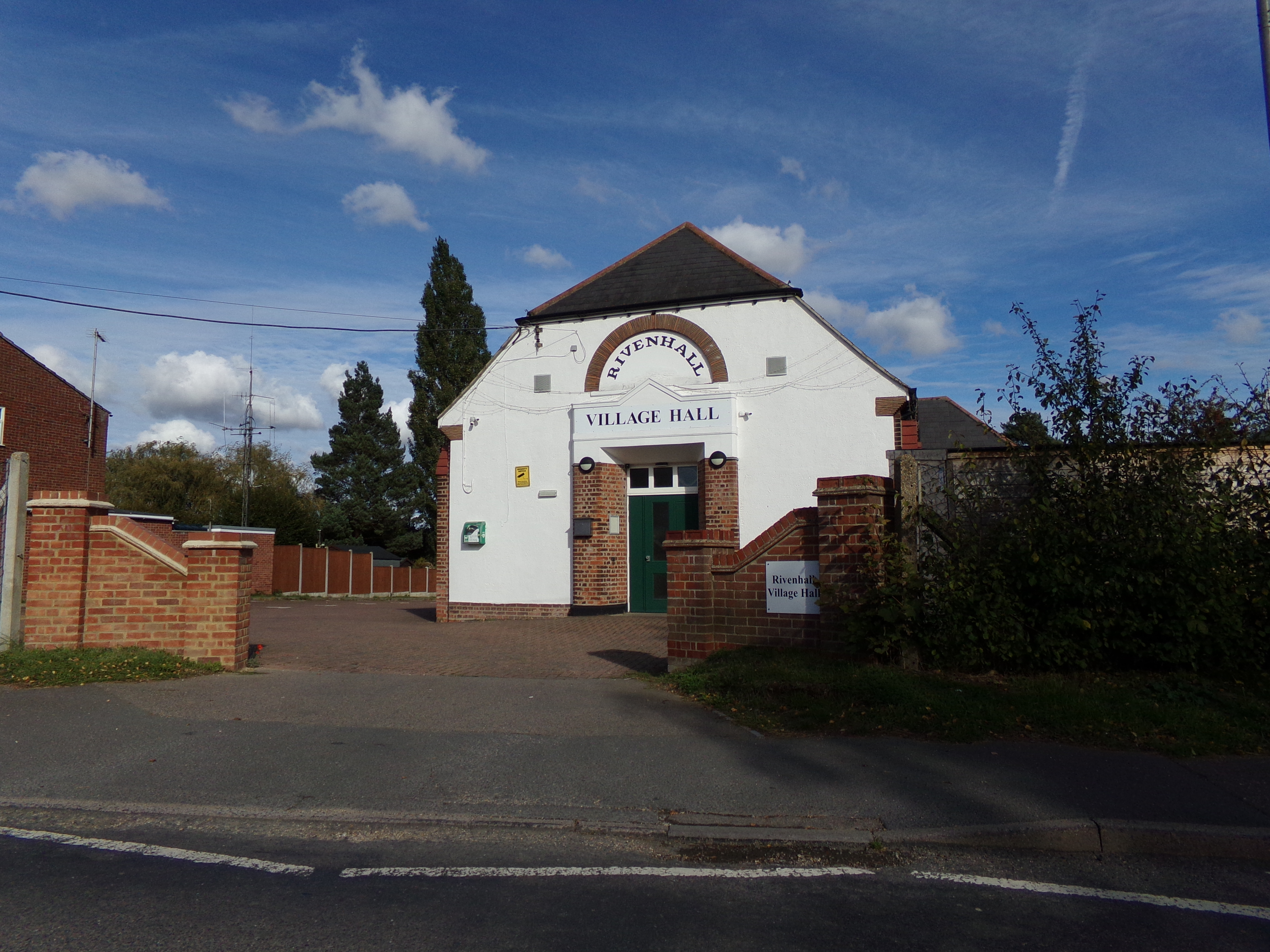
Rivenhall Village Hall

There are three tiers of local government covering Rivenhall, at parish, district, and county level: Rivenhall Parish Council, Braintree District Council, and Essex County Council. The parish council meets at both Rivenhall Village Hall and at the Henry Dixon Hall at Rivenhall End.

Rivenhall was an ancient parish in the Witham hundred of Essex. The parish historically included Silver End, which was a small hamlet until the 1920s when a model village was built there around the Crittall Windows factory.

In 1933 Rivenhall parish was abolished and its area was absorbed into the urban district of Witham. Witham Urban District was abolished in 1974 under the Local Government Act 1972, when the area became part of the new Braintree district. The area of the pre-1974 urban district became unparished as a result of the 1974 reforms. Three new civil parishes covering the area of the old urban district were subsequently created in 1982: Witham, Rivenhall, and Silver End. The new parish created in 1982 is therefore smaller than the pre-1933 parish, with Silver End being a separate parish.
