= Margaret Courtenay, Baroness Herbert =

English noblewoman

Lady Margaret Courtenay
- Baroness Herbert
- Born: c. 1499
- Died: before 1526
- Noble family: Courtenay
- Spouse: Henry Somerset, 2nd Earl of Worcester
- Father: William Courtenay, 1st Earl of Devon
- Mother: Catherine of York

Lady Margaret Courtenay (c. 1499 – before 1526) was the only daughter of William Courtenay, 1st Earl of Devon and Catherine of York. Her maternal grandparents were Edward IV of England and Elizabeth Woodville. Margaret was a younger sister of Henry Courtenay, 1st Marquess of Exeter. Their maternal first cousins included among others, Arthur, Prince of Wales, Margaret Tudor, Queen consort of Scotland, King Henry VIII of England, and Mary Tudor, Queen consort of France. When she was young she was partly raised under the protection of her aunt Elizabeth of York and lived in 1502 at the Queen's residence at Havering Palace.

She was married to Henry Somerset, elder son and heir of Charles Somerset, 1st Earl of Worcester and Elizabeth Herbert, 3rd Baroness Herbert. Later local tradition at Devon mentioned her choking on a fishbone at Holcombe in 1512; an inscription on her tomb would seem to confirm this yet the tomb could be of a different Margaret. However, there is information of her living in Richmond on 2 July 1520, when she is mentioned attending to her young first cousin, once removed, Princess Mary Tudor.

Her husband became Baron Herbert in 1507. When he became Earl of Worcester in 1526, his countess was his second wife Elizabeth Browne, allegedly an ex-mistress of Henry VIII's. Margaret seems to have died in the 1520s but no more specific date is known. Margaret and Somerset had no children; although some sources claim that she was the mother of Lucy.

== Ancestry ==
Ancestors of Margaret Courtenay, Baroness Herbert

8. Sir Hugh Courtenay
4. Edward Courtenay, 1st Earl of Devon (1485 creation)
2. William Courtenay, 1st Earl of Devon
20. Sir Philip Courtenay
10. Sir Philip Courtenay
21. Elizabeth Hungerford
5. Elizabeth Courtenay
11. Elizabeth Hungerford
1. Margaret Courtenay
24. Richard of Conisburgh, 3rd Earl of Cambridge
12. Richard Plantagenet, 3rd Duke of York
25. Anne de Mortimer
6. Edward IV of England
26. Ralph Neville, 1st Earl of Westmorland
13. Cecily Neville
27. Joan Beaufort
3. Catherine of York
28. Richard Wydeville
14. Richard Woodville, 1st Earl Rivers
29. Joan Bedlisgate
7. Elizabeth Woodville
30. Peter I, Count of Saint-Pol
15. Jacquetta of Luxembourg
31. Margaret of Baux
