= Catherine of York =

English princess (1479–1527)

- Countess of Devon
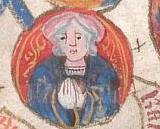
- Born: 14 August 1479; Eltham Palace, Greenwich, England
- Died: 15 November 1527 (aged 48); Tiverton Castle, Devon, England
- Burial: 3 December 1527; St Peter's Church, Tiverton
- Spouse: William Courtenay, 1st Earl of Devon (m. 1495; died 1511)
- Issue more...: Henry Courtenay, 1st Marquess of Exeter; Margaret Somerset, Baroness Herbert
- House: York
- Father: Edward IV of England
- Mother: Elizabeth Woodville

Catherine of York (14 August 1479 – 15 November 1527) was the sixth daughter of King Edward IV of England and his queen consort Elizabeth Woodville.

Soon after the death of her father and the usurpation of the throne by her uncle Richard III, Catherine was declared illegitimate along with the other children of Edward IV. The princess' mother, fearing for her children's lives, moved them to Westminster Abbey, where the late king's family received sanctuary and spent about a year; later she moved to the royal palace. When Richard III died, and Henry Tudor was on the throne under the name of Henry VII, the act recognizing the children of Edward IV as bastards was canceled. Henry VII married the eldest of Edward IV's daughters, Elizabeth, and Catherine became a valuable diplomatic asset: marriage plans with John, Prince of Asturias and later with James Stewart, Duke of Ross were made for her, but in both cases it did not come to a wedding. In 1495, Catherine was married to William Courtenay, son and heir of the Earl of Devon, an ardent supporter of Henry VII.

In 1502, Catherine's husband was suspected of being involved in the conspiracy of the House of York pretender to the throne, Edmund de la Pole, and was soon arrested, deprived of his property and rights to inherit and transfer his father's titles and possessions to his children. Catherine herself, thanks to the patronage of her sister, remained at large. After the death of Henry VII in April 1509, the new king forgave William Courtenay and returned his confiscated estates to him; Catherine's father-in-law also soon died. In May 1511, William Courtenay was restored in his title of Earl of Devon, but a month later he died of pleurisy.

Left a widow at the age of thirty-one, Catherine took a vow of celibacy. In 1512, she received from the king the right to use for life all the possessions of the late spouse in the county of Devon, in the same year the title of Earl of Devon was transferred to the ten-year-old son of the princess, Henry Courtenay. After the death of her husband, Catherine rarely visited the court: one of the few visits was the christening of the daughter of Henry VIII, Princess Mary in 1516, in which Catherine was the godmother. In Tiverton, Catherine was the head of the most powerful family in the area and the owner of a large estate, so that she could lead a lifestyle consistent with her origin. Catherine died at Tiverton Castle at the age of forty-eight and was buried with great ceremony in the adjacent parish church St. Peter. Of all the grandchildren of Edward IV, Catherine's children became the only ones who inherited claims to the English throne from the House of York.

== Life ==
=== Birth and early years ===
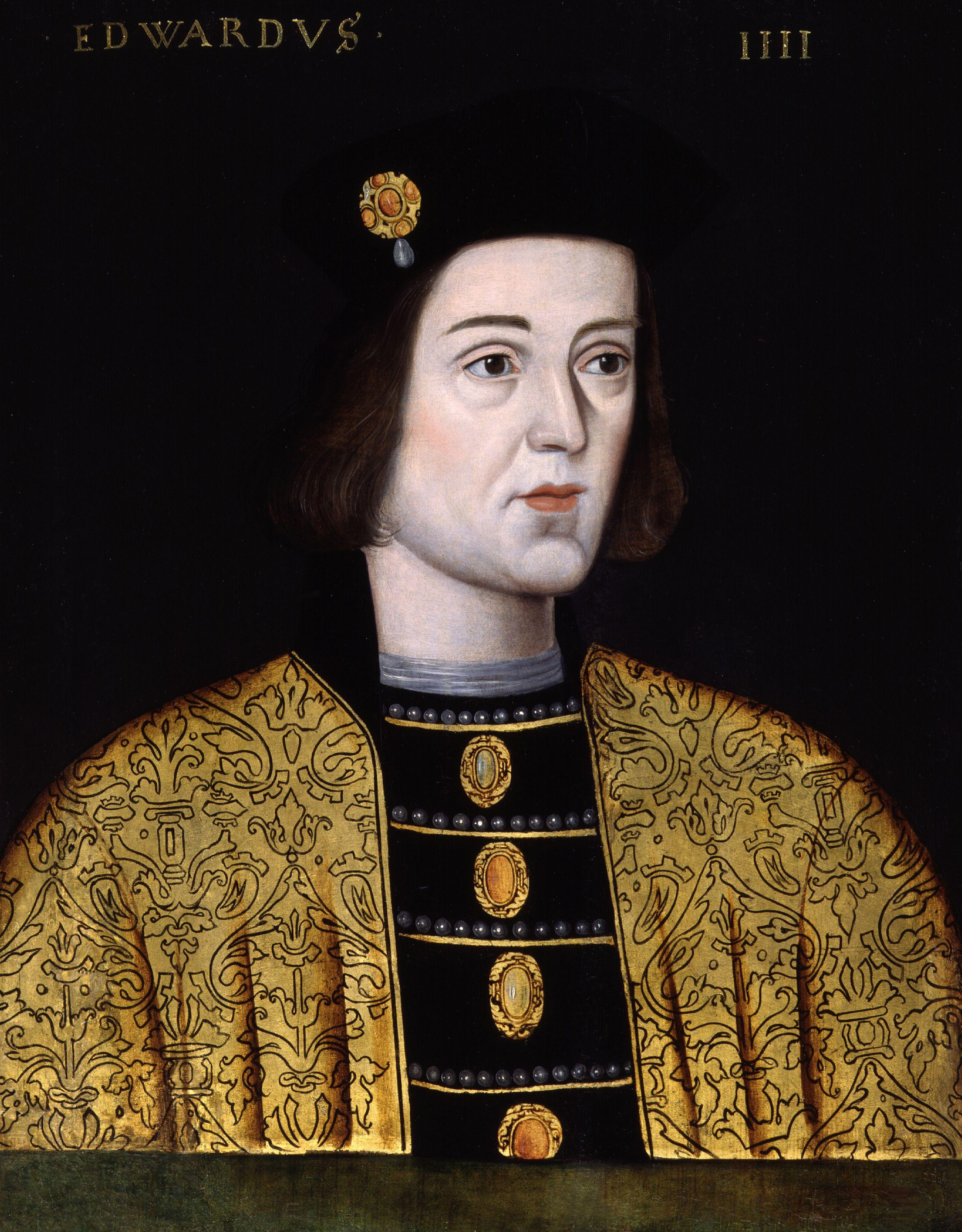
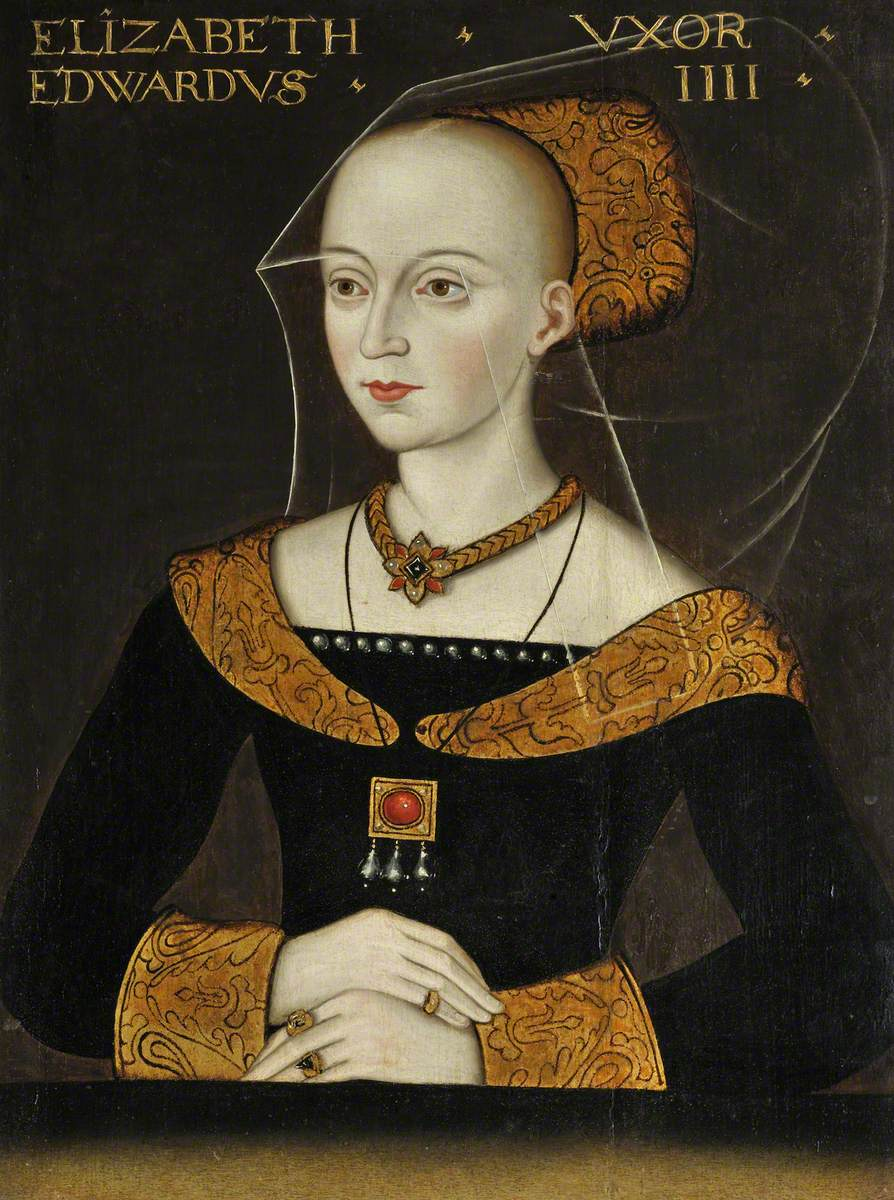
(left) Portrait of Edward IV, now at the National Portrait Gallery, London, c. 1597–1618 (right) Portrait of Elizabeth Woodville from the collection of Queens' College, Cambridge, c. 1471

The exact date of Catherine's birth is unknown. Documents have been preserved related to the manufacture of a baptismal font for her by Piers Draper; based on them, historians date the birth of the princess on 14 August 1479 or a little earlier. The alleged birthplace is Eltham Palace in Greenwich. Catherine was the sixth daughter and the ninth of ten children of King Edward IV of England and Elizabeth Woodville. The princess' wetnurse was Jane or Joanne, wife of Robert Coulson, who in November 1480, received from the king an annuity payment of £5 per year for her services.

Catherine had six sisters, of whom only four reached adulthood—three older (Elizabeth, Cecily and Anne) and one younger (Bridget); Mary, born in 1467, died at the age of 14 from some illness, and Margaret, born in 1472, died in infancy. Catherine also had five brothers: three elder full brothers who were sons of Edward IV, and two elder half-brothers from her mother's first marriage to John Grey of Groby: Thomas and Richard Grey. The youngest of Catherine's full brothers, George, died at the age of about two years, while the other two brothers, Edward V and Richard, disappeared from the Tower in 1483 during the reign of their uncle Richard III.

=== Childhood ===
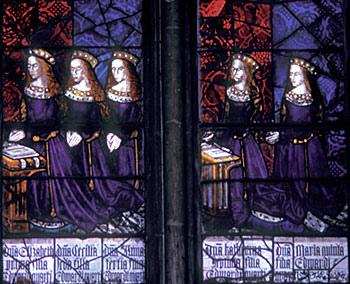
Daughters of King Edward IV. Stained glass window of the northwest transept of Canterbury Cathedral, 16th century. Catherine is depicted second from the right. (Note: The stained glass window was made by order of Edward IV by the royal master William Neuve after the birth of his sixth (but fifth surviving) daughter Catherine in August 1479, but before November 1480—when was born his youngest daughter Bridget. More recent research has determined the order of the sisters in the stained glass window as Elizabeth, Cecily, Anne, Catherine and Mary, however it is more likely that the York princesses are arranged in seniority on the stained glass window and Catherine is depicted second from the right.)

Almost from birth, Catherine was a desirable bride and in the future could become a pawn in the politics of dynastic marriages. Soon after her birth, in August 1479, a proposal was received for Catherine to marry the heir to the Catholic Monarchs—John, Prince of Asturias, who was a year older than the princess. On 28 August 1479, a preliminary marriage agreement was concluded; on 2 March 1482, this agreement was ratified by the Spanish side. However, in April 1483, the princess's father suddenly died, and the negotiations were terminated.

Edward IV's death was followed by a political crisis that dramatically changed the position of the former queen and her children. Catherine's older brother, Edward V, who succeeded to the throne, was captured by his uncle Lord Protector Richard, Duke of Gloucester, and Anthony Woodville and Richard Grey (Catherine's uncle and half-brother, respectively) who accompanied the young king, were arrested. The king was moved to the Tower of London, where he was later joined by his only full-brother, Richard; together with the rest of the children, among whom was Catherine, the dowager queen took refuge in Westminster Abbey. Two months later, on 22 June 1483, Edward IV's marriage to Elizabeth Woodville was declared illegal; all the children of the late king were declared illegitimate by the act of parliament Titulus Regius and deprived of the right to the throne and all titles. A few days later, Anthony Woodville and Richard Grey were executed. On 6 July 1483, Richard of Gloucester was proclaimed king under the name of Richard III; shortly thereafter there was no news of Catherine's brothers locked up in the Tower.

On Christmas Day 1483, Henry Tudor, whose mother was plotting with Elizabeth Woodville against King Richard III, swore in Rennes Cathedral that he would marry Edward IV's eldest daughter, Elizabeth, or the next Cecily (if the marriage with Elizabeth for some reasons will be impossible) after he takes the English throne. However, the uprising of the Tudor party, led by the Duke of Buckingham, (Note: The motives of Buckingham, who was generously endowed by Richard III upon his accession to the throne, are not clear. Some historians believe that the disappearance of the Princes in the Tower was the reason. At the same time, some researchers believe that after the execution of a number of representatives of the nobility and the alleged murder of princes on the orders of the King, the Duke "saw the light" and began to fear that he might become the next victim. However, there is another hypothesis explaining the reasons that led to the rebellion: the murder of the princes, committed by the Duke of Buckingham on his own initiative, aroused the indignation of Richard III, as a result of which the Duke was forced to flee and revolted.) failed even before this oath. After the failure of Buckingham's rebellion, Richard III agreed to negotiate with his brother's widow, Elizabeth Woodville. On 1 March 1484, the king swore publicly that the daughters of his late brother would not be harmed or molested; in addition, Richard III promised that they would not be imprisoned in the Tower or any other prison, that they would be placed "in respectable places of good name and reputation", and later be married to "men of noble birth" and given dowry lands with an annual income of 200 marks each. The princesses moved under the care of their "gracious uncle", who gave them rooms in his palace. Tudor historian Edward Hall writes that Richard III "made all the daughters of his brother solemnly arrive at his palace; as if with him new—familiar and loving entertainment—they were supposed to forget ... the trauma inflicted on them and the tyranny that preceded this". According to the generally accepted version, Catherine moved to the royal palace with her sisters, but there is an assumption that Catherine and her younger sister Bridget stayed with their mother after leaving the sanctuary.

Two years later, in August 1485, Richard III died at the Battle of Bosworth and Henry Tudor became the new king by right of conquest under the name of Henry VII. He fulfilled his promise and married Elizabeth of York, and also canceled the Titulus Regius act, which deprived the children of Edward IV of titles and rights to the throne. The act of Titulus Regius was removed from the archives, as were all documents related to it. In 1492 Dowager Queen Elizabeth died; Catherine took part in her funeral ceremony, becoming one of the youngest mourners at the royal funeral. Left an orphan, Catherine finally settled at the court of her sister the queen.

=== Marriage ===
Henry VII, once on the throne, began to build grandiose matrimonial plans for his wife's relatives. First of all, he wanted to establish peace with his northern neighbour—the Kingdom of Scotland. In November 1487, a preliminary agreement was concluded on the marriage of Catherine with the second son of King James III, James, Duke of Ross, who was almost three years older than the princess. According to the same agreement, Catherine's sister Cecily was to become the wife of the heir to the Scottish throne, James, Duke of Rothesay, (Note: In fact, Cecily's marriage to the Duke of Rothesay was planned by her father in 1474, but the protracted negotiations were halted due to a rebellion in Scotland by the Duke of Albany. Shortly before his death in 1485, Richard III married Cecily to his supporter Ralph Scrope (younger brother of the 6th Baron Scrope of Masham) but under Henry VII this marriage was annulled as not being in the interests of the dynasty in 1486.) and James III, widowed by that time, was to marry the mother of the princess, Dowager Queen Elizabeth Woodville. But James III was killed in June 1488 before these marriages were made; negotiations were interrupted and never resumed.

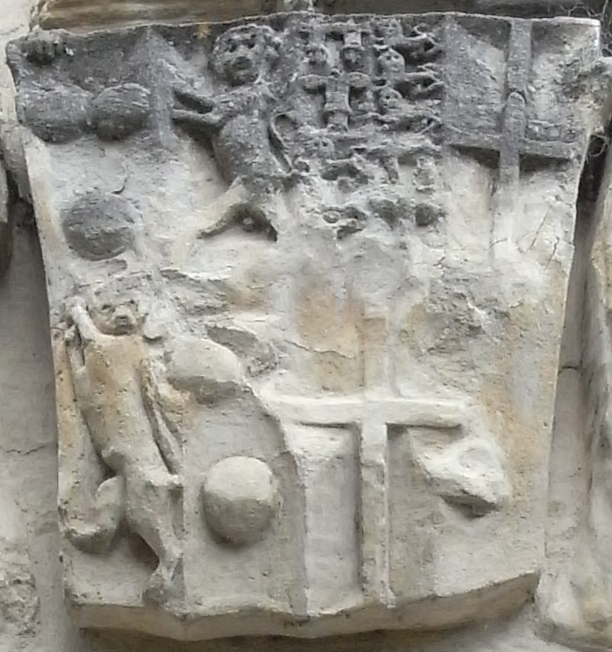
Arms of William Courtenay, 1st Earl of Devon (died 1511), above the south porch of St Peter's Church, Tiverton (detail). The arms are Courtenay impaling the paternal arms of his wife, Catherine of York. The shield is divided in halves:
- On the left (dexter), arms of the Earl of Devon: Quarterly, 1st & 4th: Or, three Torteaux (Courtenay); 2nd & 3rd: Or, a Lion rampant Azure (Redvers).
- On the right (sinister), arms of the English royal House of York: Quarterly 1st: royal arms of Edward IV; (Note: The arms of King Edward IV, emphazised his descent from Lionel of Antwerp, 1st Duke of Clarence (1338–1368), third son of King Edward III (on which basis the House of York claimed the throne), who married Elizabeth de Burgh, 4th Countess of Ulster (1332–1363). Their daughter Philippa de Burgh married Edmund Mortimer, 3rd Earl of March, whose son Roger de Mortimer, 4th Earl of March, was the great-grandfather of King Edward IV.) 2nd & 3rd: Or, a cross gules (de Burgh), 4th: Barry of six or and azure, on a chief of the first two pallets between two gyrons of the second over all an inescutcheon argent (Mortimer). These arms were also borne, with baton sinister, by Arthur Plantagenet, 1st Viscount Lisle, KG, (died 1542), the illegitimate son of Edward IV.

In October 1495, shortly after her sixteenth birthday, Catherine married the twenty-year-old William Courtenay, son and heir of the Earl of Devon, the leading nobleman and landowner in Devonshire who was an ardent supporter of King Henry VII and whose family had been ardent supporters of the Lancastrian cause during the Wars of the Roses. The House of Courtenay, a French noble family of the County of Gâtinais, also descended from King Edward I of England through his daughter Elizabeth of Rhuddlan. The marriage of Catherine and William was approved by Parliament during the same session as that of Catherine's older sister Anne with Thomas Howard, later 3rd Duke of Norfolk also gained approval. It is known that Queen Elizabeth paid for the wedding clothes for the groom and donated money for the upbringing of the future children of the newlyweds. Being in favour with the king, the Courtenays spent most of their time at court; Catherine as the principal lady, received a salary of £50 per year. Outside the court, Catherine and William preferred to use Tiverton Castle or the ancient Courtenay family home, Colcombe Castle, as a residence; both residences were located in Devon, but Catherine preferred Colcombe. The couple had three children: two sons, Henry and Edward, and a daughter, Margaret.

=== Downfall ===
In later years, Catherine was close to her sister the queen. She attended the lavish wedding of her eldest nephew, Arthur, Prince of Wales and Catherine of Aragon in November 1501, and the betrothal of her eldest niece, Margaret, to King James IV of Scotland in January 1502. However, a few months later, disgrace began: William Courtenay was arrested and sent to prison on suspicion of participating in the conspiracy of the Yorkist pretender to the throne, Edmund de la Pole. He spent several years in prison, although there was no evidence of his guilt; probably the sole reason for Courtenay's arrest was his marriage to a princess of the House of York. William was deprived of property and rights to inherit the titles and possessions of his father, as well as the right to transfer them to his children; thus, on the death of the Earl of Devon, his title and possessions were to fall to the crown.

Only thanks to the patronage of her sister the queen, Catherine remained at liberty and at court and received a livelihood. Elizabeth of York ordered that Lady Margaret Coton take care of the upbringing and education of Catherine's children, and allocated funds for this. Catherine's children were moved under the protection of Coton to Sir John Hussey's country house at Havering-atte-Bower, which at that time was located on lands that were in the use of the queen or her mother. The content of the children, as well as their other servants, which included two maids, grooms and nannies, was also paid by the queen. She also paid for the needs of Catherine's husband, who was imprisoned in the Tower. In June 1502, the youngest of Catherine's two sons, Edward, died, which was a heavy blow for the princess. Catherine's grief was aggravated by the fact that the child's illness was transient, and his mother, who was with the queen in Notley, did not have time to go to the bedside of her dying son. Since Catherine did not have the funds for the funeral of her son, her sister again paid all the expenses. The queen, on the other hand, allocated funds for a mourning wardrobe for the princess; orders regarding Catherine's wardrobe became one of the last manifestations of the queen's concern for her sister.

In February 1503, Queen Elizabeth of York died. The death of her sister was a great loss for Catherine, since the queen was not only a relative and close friend for her, but also a patroness. Starting from the second day of mourning, Catherine led the mourners at her sister's funeral; on the first day, this post was occupied by the main lady-in-waiting of the late queen, Lady Elizabeth Stafford, since Catherine's wardrobe was not ready. Catherine became the only person to attend all three masses for the late queen.

Left without friends and support from her sister, Catherine turned to her father-in-law for help. The Earl of Devon, a very benevolent person, allocated an annual allowance for his grandchildren—100 marks for Henry and 200 marks for Margaret; however, for Catherine herself, probably, no funds were allocated, since there are no documents confirming the opposite. Probably, the son of the late queen, Henry, Prince of Wales, who by that time had become the heir to the throne, also provided some assistance to the aunt, but there is no documentary evidence of this either.

=== Return to court ===
Henry VII died in April 1509, and the life of Catherine herself changed dramatically. She was aunt to the new king, Henry VIII, who immediately invited her to court, where she attended the funeral of the late monarch. Henry VIII paid for all of Catherine's expenses related to moving to the court. At the same time, Catherine received the post of maid of honour to the younger sister of the king, Mary (later queen consort of France). One of the first state acts of Henry VIII was the forgiveness and return of possessions to Catherine's husband, William Courtenay. The Courtenays were present at all the celebrations at court, and both were in such favour with the young king that Catherine became the only godmother (Note: David Starkey names the Duke of Cornwall's only godmother Margaret of Austria, who was represented by Catherine's sister Anne.) of the heir to the throne, Henry, Duke of Cornwall, who was born on 1 January 1511.

Catherine's father-in-law died in 1509, and formally her husband became the heir to the Earl's title and possessions, however, in order to receive the inheritance, William needed the approval of the king and the repeal of the act of deprivation. Until all the formalities were met, Catherine, "the king's dearest aunt", was assigned annuity payments in the amount of 200 marks. Despite the friendly attitude towards his aunt and her husband, Henry VIII put forward a number of conditions under which William Courtenay could transfer the title and possessions of his father. One of these conditions was the renunciation of Catherine's claims to the lands of the Earldom of March (to which she was also entitled as one of the descendants of Anne de Mortimer), and as her father's personal, non-crown property. Catherine, having neither the means nor the desire to fight for the possessions of the Marches, accepted the proposal of her nephew, and on 12 April 1511, the parties signed an agreement.

On 9 or 10 May 1511 the title of Earl of Devon was recreated for William Courtenay, and the act that prohibited the succession of titles to his children was repealed. The king guaranteed the transfer to the couple of some possessions, seized in favour of the crown from Thomas Courtenay during the reign of Catherine's father. In addition, several estates were personally transferred to Catherine with the right to transfer them by inheritance.

=== Widowhood ===
By the time all the formalities related to the transfer of the title to William Courtenay were completed, he was already seriously ill; on 9 June 1511 he died of pleurisy at the Palace of Placentia, where he was staying with his wife. The king gave special permission for a magnificent funeral at Blackfriars Abbey; the organization of the funeral was carried out by Catherine, whom her husband in his will called the main executor of his last will. After the funeral, she ordered daily masses to be read and candles to be kept burning around the clock on William's grave.

Left a widow at the age of thirty-one, on 6 July 1511, Catherine completed the transfer of her rights to the Earldom of March to the crown and, in order to ensure a further life free from matrimonial plans, she took a vow of celibacy on 13 July in the presence of the Bishop of London, Richard FitzJames. Being by nature very active, Catherine devoted the rest of her life to putting things in order in her possessions and those of her son. On 3 February 1512, she received from the king the right to use for life all the possessions of the late spouse in the Earldom of Devon.

In February 1512, Catherine sent a petition to Parliament on behalf of her son, in which she asked to consider the issue of inheriting the title and possessions of his late father by young Henry Courtenay. The petition was read three times in the House of Lords, but consideration of the issue was postponed due to the need to discuss it with the king. The reason for the delay was the fact that some of Henry's ancestral property had been transferred by the king to the Courtenays before William was reinstated. Another reason was the claims to the possessions of Thomas Courtenay by the husbands of his co-heiresses sisters: Sir Hugh Conway (husband of Elizabeth Courtenay), and Sir William Knyvet of Buckenham (husband of Joan Courtenay). In October 1512, Catherine, through the mediation of the Bishop of London, managed to negotiate with both applicants: some lands were transferred to Conway for life use, and a life annuity of £177 was also promised; Knyvet's claims were withdrawn in exchange for a lifetime annuity of £200.

In November 1512, Parliament approved the transfer of the title and lands of the late William Courtenay to his ten-year-old son Henry, and over time, Catherine's son joined the circle of those close to the king. She herself also enjoyed the favor of the king and she signed her letters and documents as "Princess Catherine, Countess of Devon, daughter, sister and aunt of kings". In addition, she adopted as her personal coat of arms the royal coat of arms of England, combined with the coat of arms of Courtenay and the addition of the arms of the Earls of Ulster and March.

Settling the affairs of her son, Catherine did not forget about her only daughter: in 1512 she began to look for a groom for Margaret. Catherine sent letters to the royal servants with a request to determine the most profitable candidates for the Margaret's husband. Further events are described by historians inconsistently. Mary Anne Everett Green retells a local legend that shortly after her marriage to Henry Somerset (son and heir of the Earl of Worcester), Margaret, during a visit to her mother at Colcombe Castle, choked on a fish bone and died; the same version is confirmed by the inscription on her grave. However, other sources report that Catherine's daughter visited her cousin Mary in 1520. There is no further information about Margaret, and her husband, who inherited his father's title in 1526, was by this time married again.

=== Last years and death ===
After the death of her husband, Catherine was rarely at court, preferring to live in Tiverton or Colcombe Castles in Devon, although she often received guests in Colcombe. (Note: It is known about the magnificent reception hosted by Catherine in honor of the arrival of her nephew, the 2nd Marquess of Dorset, as well as the visit to the princess by Lord Montagu.) One of the few appearances of the princess at court was the christening of Henry VIII's daughter Mary in 1516, at which Catherine was the godmother. A year earlier, Elizabeth Grey, Viscountess Lisle, was placed under her care and became the first wife of Catherine's son Henry, who was granted several mansions and other benefits. In Tiverton, Catherine was the head of the most powerful family in the area and the owner of a large estate. Her estates, managed by a network of employees, brought Catherine an annual income of about £2,750 –a large amount on which the household was supported. In 1519, Sir Hugh Conway died, claiming some of the possessions of Courtenay, and Catherine, through an act of Parliament, was returned the lands that were in the life interest of the deceased.

Detailed records from the early 1520s show that Catherine lived a life befitting her origins: she regularly bought luxury items such as spices, French and Rhenish wines, and expensive fabrics (such as velvet and satin). The princess' chapel had many beautiful vestments, sacred vessels, religious books and images of saints. Catherine was on good terms with the prelates of Devon, received gifts from the Bishop of Exeter and from the abbots of Ford, Buckland and Newenham. In the 1520s, the princess was fond of hunting, listened to minstrels, kept three jesters; on New Year's holidays in 1524, several troupes of actors visited Catherine's house, as well as epiphany singers from Exeter. She often traveled around her possessions, and by the age of 45 she was still active: she rode a lot, hunted and did business. However, the fact that the inventory list of Catherine's property, compiled after her death, included a cart with horses, may indicate a decrease in the activity of the princess in her later years.

Catherine maintained good relations with the royal couple: it is known that in 1524 the princess sent them £20 as a gift. She regularly gave gifts to her son, in particular, for the birth of her grandson Edward, she sent Henry £200 and gave another £40 to the messenger who announced her the birth. Historical documents describe the princess as a very kind person: she never quarreled with her neighbors if they happened to shoot game in her possessions, and did not severely punish the poor if they decided to eat strawberries or a rabbit on her land; in addition, she regularly distributed generous alms. In the spring of 1524, Catherine fell ill. Two doctors were called to her bedside; she sent orders to her domain, probably in case of her death, which may indicate the seriousness of the disease. In nearby churches they prayed for Catherine's health. On 2 May 1527, Catherine made a will in which for the most part she took care of her soul: she ordered the payment of £21 a year for an unlimited period to three priests who were to say mass daily in St. Peter's Church in Tiverton in the presence of three poor men, who also received payouts once a week. Catherine died on 15 November 1527 at Tiverton Castle at the age of about 49 years (Note: Catherine outlived all her siblings and became the last child of King Edward IV to die.) and was buried on 2 December with a magnificent ceremony in the local church of St Peter's Church. By her order, all servants were to attend the funeral in black robes and receive an annual salary. Also present at the funeral were the abbots of Ford, Montecut and Torre; the sermon was read by a canon of Exeter Cathedral. Eight thousand poor people were given money to pray for the soul of Catherine.

On the grave of the princess, by order of her son, a horizontal effigy was installed. During the English Reformation, the chapel in which Catherine was buried was destroyed by Protestants. Subsequently, a burial was discovered that contained the remains of several people, so it was not possible to determine which of them belonged to the last princess from the House of York.

== Issue ==
Catherine and her husband William Courtenay had three children:

- Henry Courtenay (c. 1496 – 9 January 1539), 2nd Earl of Devon and Marquess of Exeter. Married, firstly, with Elizabeth Grey, suo jure Viscountess Lisle, and, secondly, with Gertrude Blount. From his second marriage, Henry had two sons, of whom only one survived infancy.
- Edward Courtenay (c. 1497 – June 1502), died in infancy.
- Margaret Courtenay (c. 1499 – bef. 1526), married Henry Somerset, son and heir of the 1st Earl of Worcester and Elizabeth Somerset, suo jure Baroness Herbert. During Margaret's life, her husband bore only the title of Baron Herbert, inherited from his mother, since the title of his father passed to him later. The marriage was childless.

Since not a single brother of the princess survived to the reign of the kings from the Tudor dynasty, and her sisters (with the exception of Queen Elizabeth) did not leave surviving descendants recognized by the crown, (Note: Catherine's brothers, Edward V and Richard, disappeared from the Tower in 1483. Her other brother, George, died in early childhood in 1479. Catherine's younger sister, Bridget, was a nun. In addition to Elizabeth, two more sisters of Catherine had offspring—Cecily and Anne; all of Anne's and Cecily's children from her second marriage died in childhood, and Cecily's third marriage and offspring from it were never recognized by the crown.) Catherine's children became the only ones of all the grandchildren of Edward IV who inherited dangerous claims to the English throne from the House of York, which played a fatal role in the life of the descendants of the princess. Although Catherine's son, Henry Courtenay, was still in favor with the king for some time after his mother's death, in 1538, thanks to the denunciation of his cousin Geoffrey Pole, Henry's correspondence with Geoffrey's brother, Catholic Cardinal Reginald Pole, who claimed the throne of England, was discovered. (Note: Geoffrey and Reginald Pole are sons of Margaret Plantagenet and great-nephews of Edward IV.) Henry, along with his wife Gertrude and son Edward, was arrested and imprisoned in the Tower of London; a year later, Henry was executed on charges of treason. After the execution of her husband, Gertrude was deprived of her property, but received her freedom. The only son of Gertrude was much less fortunate: he spent most of his life in prison and was released only during the reign of Queen Mary I; in 1554, Edward Courtenay took only a passive part in Wyatt's rebellion, due to which he was expelled from the country, but not executed. He died at Padua in 1556, as the last descendant of Catherine of York.
