= Cecily of York =

English princess (1469–1507)

- Viscountess Welles
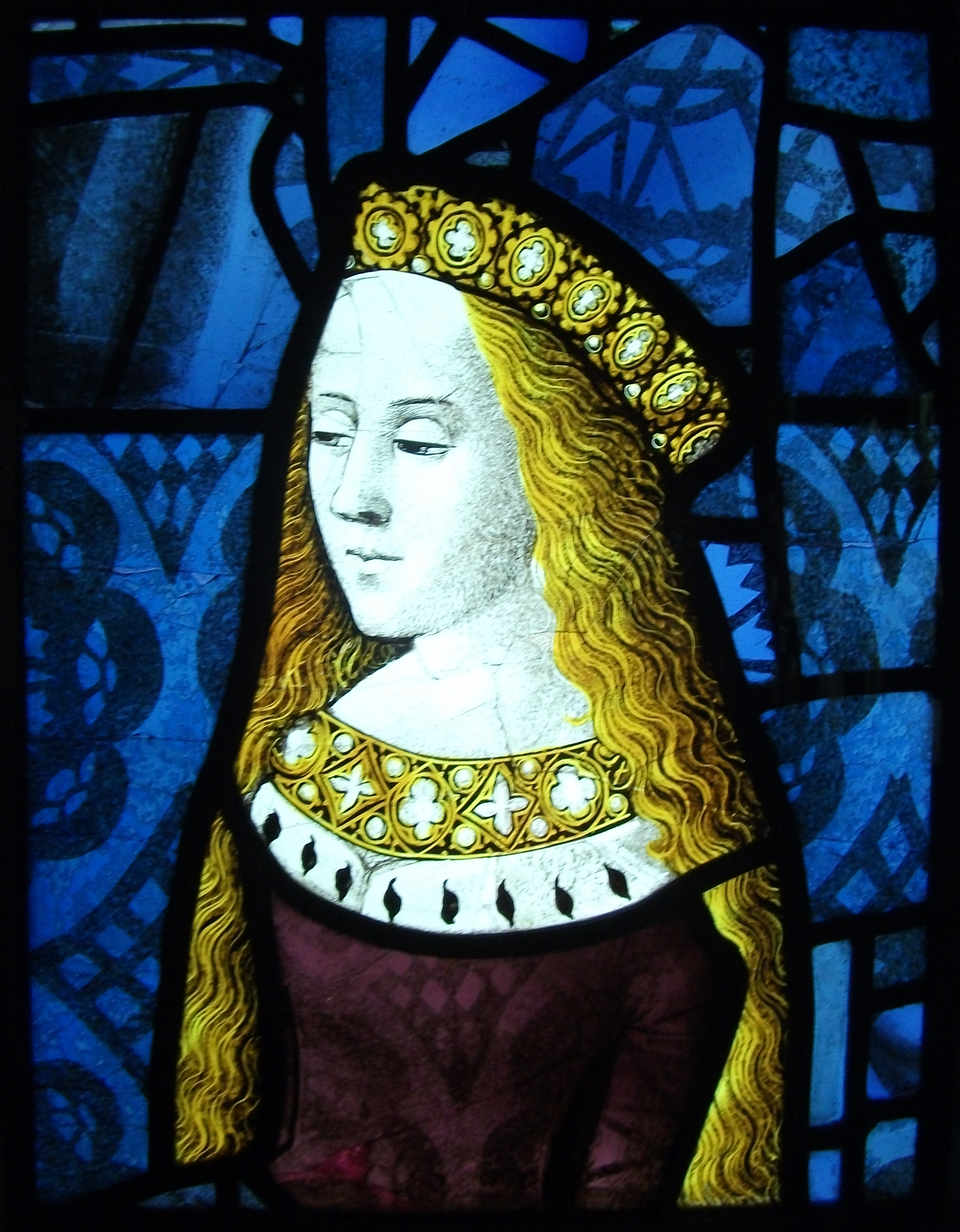
- Cecily in stained glass, probably 1482–83, formerly Canterbury Cathedral, now Burrell Collection.
- Born: 20 March 1469; Westminster Palace, London, England
- Died: 24 August 1507 (aged 38): Sandown, Isle of Wight; or Hatfield, Hertfordshire, England
- Burial: Quarr Abbey, Isle of Wight or; the friary at Kings Langley, Herts
- Spouse: Ralph Scrope (m. 1485; ann. 1486): John Welles, 1st Viscount Welles (m. 1487/88; died 1499); Sir Thomas Kyme (m. 1502/04)
- Issue: Elizabeth Welles; Anne Welles; Richard Kyme; Margaret Kyme
- House: York
- Father: Edward IV of England
- Mother: Elizabeth Woodville

Cecily of York (20 March 1469 – 24 August 1507), also known as Cecelia, was the third daughter of King Edward IV of England and his queen consort Elizabeth Woodville.

Shortly after the death of her father and before the assumption of the throne by her uncle King Richard III, Cecily and her siblings were declared illegitimate. Queen Elizabeth, fearing for the children's lives, moved them to Westminster Abbey, where the late king's family received asylum and spent about a year. After Richard III promised not to harm the children, Cecily and her sisters went to court. Soon there may have been rumors that the king was going to marry one of his nieces – Elizabeth or Cecily. However, shortly before his death, Richard III arranged the marriage of Cecily to one of his supporters – Ralph Scrope, the younger brother of the 6th Baron Scrope of Masham, who was much lower in status by birth than the princess.

When Richard III died at the Battle of Bosworth and the throne was taken by Henry Tudor, the act recognising the children of Edward IV as bastards was repealed, and Cecily's marriage was annulled as not being in the interests of the dynasty. In 1488, Cecily married John Welles, 1st Viscount Welles, a half-brother of the king's mother Lady Margaret Beaufort; in this second marriage, Cecily gave birth to two daughters.

In 1499, she became a widow. After several years of mourning, and without the permission of the king, Cecily married a Lincolnshire squire, Sir Thomas Kyme, with whom she gave birth to two more children. Cecily's marriage to Kyme and their children were not recognised by the Crown, and she herself was banished from court and deprived of the possessions inherited from her second husband's will. Nevertheless, the princess maintained a good relationship with the king's mother: it was Lady Margaret Beaufort who paid part of the expenses of Cecily's funeral in 1507.

== Birth and family ==
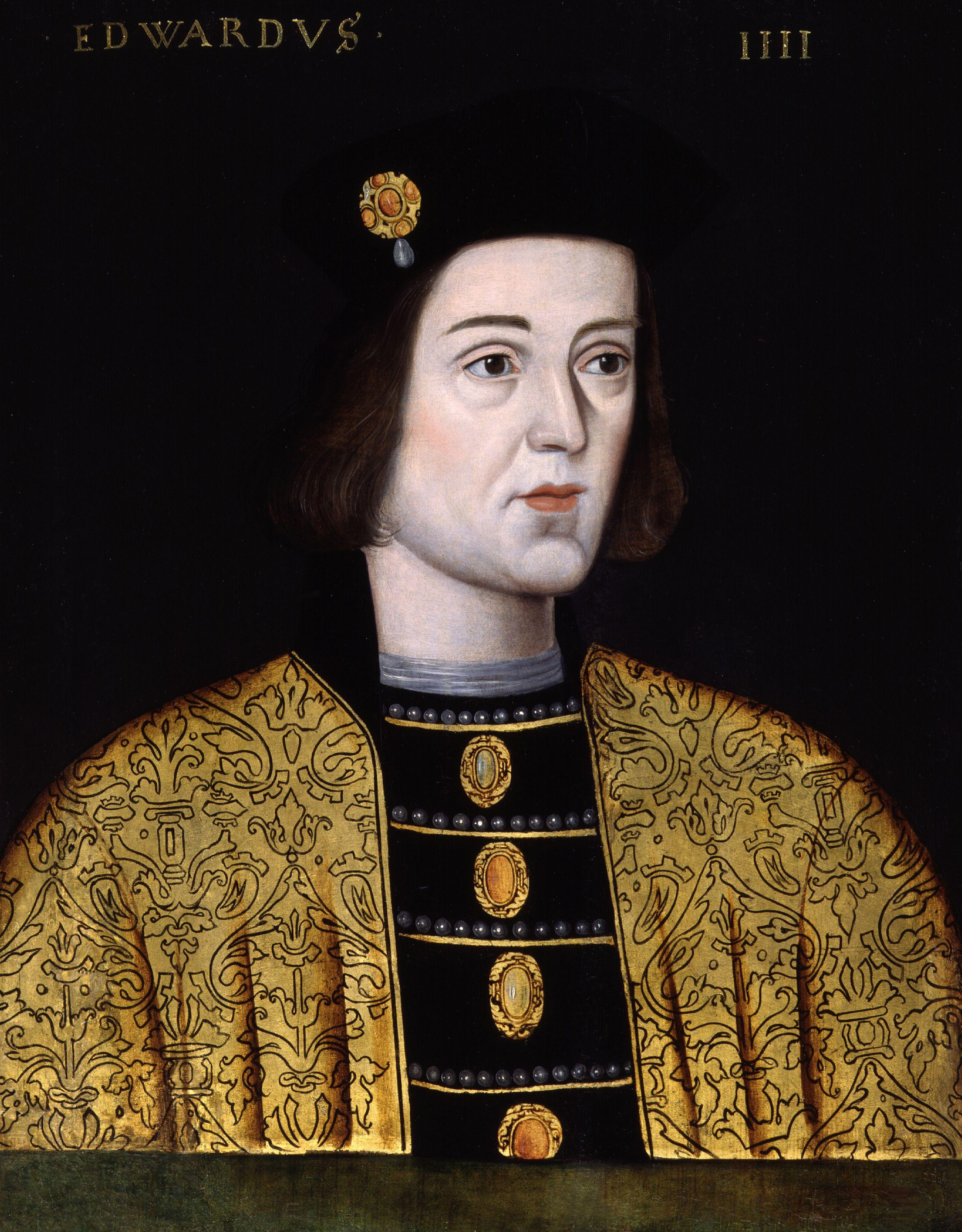
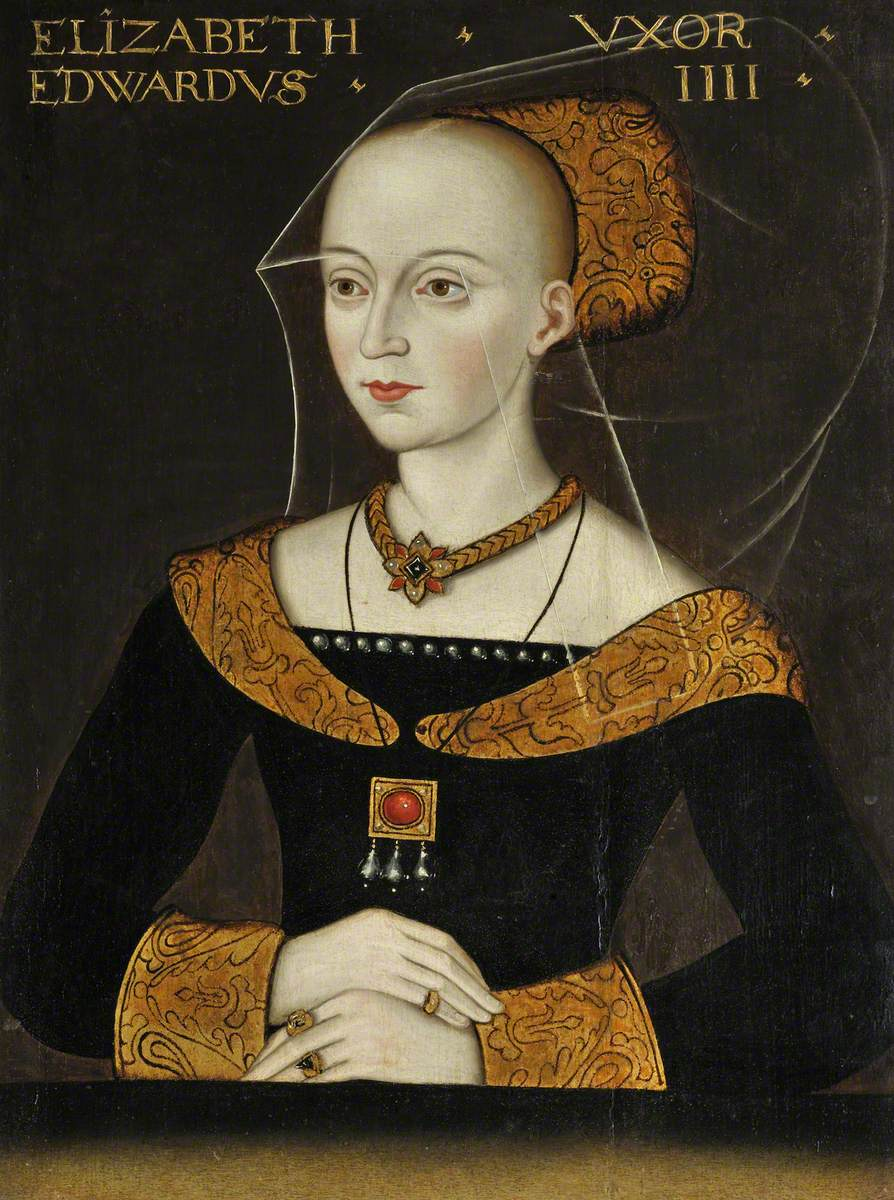
(left) Portrait of Edward IV, now at the National Portrait Gallery, London, c. 1597 – 1618 (right) Portrait of Elizabeth Woodville from the collection of Queens' College, Cambridge, c. 1471

Cecily was born on 20 March 1469 at Westminster Palace as the third daughter of ten children of King Edward IV and Elizabeth Woodville; being the third child from her parents' ten children, the princess also had two half-brothers from her mother's first marriage to John Grey of Groby: Thomas and Richard Grey. From her six full-sisters, only four reached adulthood –one eldest (Elizabeth) and three younger (Anne, Catherine and Bridget). Mary, who was about two years older than Cecily, died at the age of 14 from an unknown illness, and Margaret, who was about three years younger than Cecily, died in infancy. None of Cecily's three full-brothers survived to adulthood: George died at about two years of age, and the other two, Edward V and Richard, disappeared from the Tower in 1483 during the reign of their uncle King Richard III.

Her paternal grandparents were Richard of York, 3rd Duke of York (who claimed the rights of the House of York to the English throne) and Cecily Neville, and her maternal grandparents were Richard Woodville, 1st Earl Rivers, and Jacquetta of Luxembourg, Dowager Duchess of Bedford. Presumably Cecily was named after her paternal grandmother.

== Reign of Edward IV ==
=== Crisis of 1469–1471 ===
The birth of Cecily, the third daughter in a row, was a great disappointment for Edward IV. For the first time he suggested that he would not have sons and that the crown could pass to his eldest daughter, Elizabeth. In the first months of Cecily's life, an acute political crisis arose in the country: Edward IV's most powerful supporter, the Earl of Warwick, dissatisfied with the king for a number of reasons, entered into an alliance with Edward's younger brother George, Duke of Clarence. They moved their troops from Calais to England and announced George's claim to the English throne. During this time, Cecily's mother, along with at least two daughters, one of whom was Elizabeth, visited Norwich, where they were received with magnificent celebrations and theatrical performances; it is not known for certain which of the two younger princesses at that time accompanied her mother, however, it was probably Mary rather than Cecily, who was very young. Soon Warwick captured the king, and executed without trial Cecily's maternal grandfather and uncle – Earl Rivers and John Woodville. At the same time, Cecily's maternal grandmother, Jacquetta of Luxembourg, was arrested after being accused of witchcraft and the use of love spells on the king. Although Jacquetta was acquitted, this unpleasant episode, as well as the unmotivated execution of Rivers, showed how far the enemies of Edward IV were ready to go to destroy his wife and her family. Despite all this, the queen herself and her daughters were not harmed during Warwick's brief rise, except that Cecily's mother was assigned a reduced staff of servants.

By the autumn of 1469, Edward IV managed to regain his freedom. Warwick and Clarence fled to France and formed an alliance with the House of Lancaster. In September 1470, as the king prepared for an invasion by the combined forces of his enemies, Cecily, her sisters, and her mother were moved to the Tower of London for their safety. Already in early October, it became known that Edward IV, together with his brother Richard, Duke of Gloucester, had fled the country, having only a small hope of returning; upon receiving this news, Queen Elizabeth, along with her mother and three sisters hurriedly left the Tower on a barge and arrived in search of refuge at Westminster Abbey. It was then almost empty. The fugitives were taken under their protection by the abbot of Westminster, Thomas Milling, a kind, hospitable man who did not want to place the queen and children with the criminals who had also sought sanctuary there, and instead gave them his house at the western entrance to the abbey. There were three rooms and everything necessary for the comfort of the royal family. It is known that ordinary Londoners provided assistance to the royal family: the butcher John Gould donated half a cow and two sheep a week to the family, and a fishmonger provided them with provisions on Fridays and fasting days.

While in hiding, the princesses spent most of their time with nannies; in early November 1470 their brother Prince Edward was born and Queen Elizabeth was busy caring for him. Cecily and her family spent another five months in sanctuary. In April 1471, Edward IV returned to England and the first thing he did, after attending a thanksgiving service at Westminster Abbey, was to bring his family out of hiding. On the same night, Cecily, along with other family members, was transported to Baynard's Castle, which served as the residence of her paternal grandmother, Cecily Neville. On 11 April Cecily, accompanied by the King's mother, the queen's brother Anthony Woodville and the Archbishop of Canterbury Thomas Bourchier went to the royal chambers of the Tower of London, while Cecily's father went north to reclaim the crown. On 14 April, Warwick was killed at the Battle of Barnet, and on 4 May, Edward IV finally defeated the Lancastrian troops at the Battle of Tewkesbury, in which the Lancaster heir Edward of Westminster, Prince of Wales was killed and Margaret of Anjou was captured. However, on 12 May, while Edward IV was still on his way to London, the last supporters of the Lancasters organised an attack on the Tower, intending to restore Henry VI to the throne; two towers, one of which Cecily and her family were sheltering in, were fired on from the river. The attack was repulsed, but after this the king decided to put his predecessor to death, and on 21 May 1471, King Henry VI was murdered in his dungeon. The death of Henry VI returned Cecily to the position of the daughter of a legitimate and recognised monarch.

=== Princess of Scotland ===
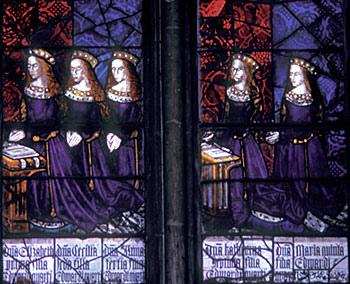
Daughters of King Edward IV. Stained glass window of the northwest transept of Canterbury Cathedral, 16th century. Cecily is depicted third in the left. (Note: The stained glass window was made by order of Edward IV by the royal master William Neuve after the birth of his sixth (but fifth surviving) daughter Catherine in August 1479, but before November 1480 – when was born his youngest daughter Bridget. More recent research has determined the order of the sisters in the stained glass window as Elizabeth, Cecily, Anne, Catherine and Mary, however it is more likely that the York princesses are arranged in seniority on the stained glass window and Cecily is depicted third from the left.)

In 1474, the first marriage plans for Cecily began to appear: Edward IV negotiated the marriage of his daughter to the heir to the Scottish throne, James, Duke of Rothesay. The formal betrothal took place on 26 October or 26 December 1474 in Edinburgh between the proxies of the bride and groom: the Earl of Crawford and Baron Scrope, respectively. As a widow's share in the event of the death of James during the life of his father, Cecily received all the possessions that the prince himself used, including the Duchy of Rothesay, the County of Carrick and lands that were part of the personal possessions of the House of Stewart. In the event that the prince became King of Scotland or if his mother died during her husband's lifetime, Cecily would receive a third of all lands, possessions and taxes assigned to the queen, or their equivalent. In the event of the premature death of Cecily or James, the hypothetical second son of King James III (at the time of the betrothal, Rothesay was the only child of the king) had to marry any other daughter of Edward IV, if she was not older or younger than the prince by more than three or four years. As a dowry, Cecily received 20,000 marks from her father. These funds were to be paid in instalments: 2,000 marks within three months after the conclusion of the contract, 2,000 more within two years after that, and the rest of the amount was to be paid at a 1,000 marks per year until full payment. Edward IV and James III were to meet at Berwick in the summer of 1475 to hand over the first part of Cecily's dowry. Apparently, the meeting took place, since on 20 June 1475 Edward IV signed a will, according to which his successor would have to pay Scotland the remaining amount of 18,000 marks from the dowry of the princess. Since the conclusion of the engagement, Cecily has been called the "Princess of Scotland".

In 1481, when Cecily reached marriageable age, James III began to insist on her marriage to his son. An embassy was sent to England, which was supposed to deliver the princess to Scotland. But Edward IV felt that the Scottish king was only motivated by the desire to obtain the remainder of Cecily's dowry, and the princess's departure was delayed. A year later, the engagement between Cecily's older sister Elizabeth and the Dauphin Charles of France was broken off, and James III decided to follow the example of his French patron. The formal reason was that James III's brother Alexander, Duke of Albany, who was accused of treason, was hiding at the English court. Demanding the extradition of the rebellious duke, the Scots made several raids on the border territories of England, which caused Edward IV in June 1482 to break off his daughter's engagement and consider instead the betrothal of Cecily to the Duke of Albany, whom the English king intended to help put on the Scottish throne. On 11 June the Treaty of Fotheringhay between Albany and Edward IV was signed. Its terms included agreement to the marriage of Cecily and the Scottish pretender, on condition that the duke succeeded in ending his marriage to his French wife Anne de la Tour d'Auvergne in accordance with all Christian norms within a year. By 1482, Edward IV had helped the Duke of Albany to seize the regency: Alexander renounced his claims to the crown, was forgiven by his brother and received his possessions back.

The Scots were unhappy with the presence of English troops in the country and therefore put pressure on James III to resume the betrothal between his son and Cecily. Edward IV agreed to resume negotiations on the condition that he would be returned that part of his daughter's dowry that had already been paid. However, the negotiations were never resumed, because the Duke of Albany again turned to the English king for help, and his marriage with Cecily was again under consideration. However, negotiations for a marriage with Albany ceased, as Edward IV died in April 1483.

=== Court life and father's death ===
Little is known about Cecily's life during the Scottish marriage negotiations. Until December 1475, the princess was probably brought up by the governess Lady Margaret Berners (wife of John Bourchier, 1st Baron Berners, great-grandson of King Edward III and a close friend of the Queen Elizabeth's family); prior to this, Lady Margaret was engaged in the education of the elder sisters of the princess, Elizabeth and Mary. In 1476, Cecily, among others, attended the reburial ceremony for the remains of her paternal grandfather the Duke of York and his second son Edmund, Earl of Rutland at Fotheringay; two years later she attended the wedding of her younger brother Richard, Duke of York and Anne de Mowbray, 8th Countess of Norfolk. In 1480, she, alongside her older sister, Mary, was made a Lady of the Garter; historian Mary Anne Everett Green in 1851 pointed out that in documents about the renewal of the wardrobe of the royal family for the ceremony of consecration of princesses, Cecily was named before Mary, and expressed doubts about the latter being older.

On 9 April 1483, when Cecily was fourteen years old, Edward IV died suddenly. This was followed by a political crisis that dramatically changed the position of the queen and her children. Cecily's younger brother, Edward V, who succeeded to the throne, was captured by his uncle Lord Protector Richard, Duke of Gloucester. Anthony Woodville and Richard Grey (Cecily's uncle and half-brother respectively), who accompanied the young king, were arrested. Edward V was taken to the Tower of London, where he was later joined by his only full brother, the Duke of York; along with the rest of her children, among whom was Cecily, the now Queen Dowager Elizabeth took refuge in Westminster Abbey. Elizabeth devised a plan according to which one of her elder daughters, Elizabeth or Cecily, was to flee abroad in order to attract foreign supporters to rescue Edward V and Richard of York from the Tower; it was also planned that if the princes could not be saved, this princess, with the support of foreign supporters, would declare her rights to the throne. However, the plan was revealed to Richard of Gloucester by a certain "traitor in the queen's camp". On Gloucester's orders, his squire John Nesfield sent guards to Westminster, who, day and night, inspected everyone who entered and left the sanctuary.

== Reign of Richard III ==
On 22 June 1483 the marriage of Edward IV with Elizabeth Woodville was declared illegal – all the children (Note: According to Philippe de Commines, a diplomat at the court of the Charles the Bold, Duke of Burgundy, who was married to Margaret of York, an aunt of Cecily of York, only two of the elder daughters of Edward IV were declared illegitimate at the time that their younger brothers were excluded from the throne by the Act of Titulus Regius that confirmed Richard III's right to the throne. However, this was an error. The relevant line in the Titulus Regius says that "all th'issue and children of the said king [Edward IV] been bastards, and unable to inherite or to clayme anything by inheritance, by the lawe and custome of England".) of the late king were declared illegitimate by the act of parliament Titulus Regius and deprived of their rights to the throne and all titles. A few days later, Cecily's uncle and half-brother, Anthony Woodville and Richard Gray, who had been captured previously, were executed. The Lord Protector, acting on information provided by Robert Stillington, Bishop of Bath and Wells, was offered the crown by the Three Estates of the Realm (Crown and Parliament) on the grounds that his brother's marriage had not been valid, and on 6 July he was proclaimed king as Richard III. Soon afterwards, Cecily's brothers Edward V and Richard of York (the "Princes in the Tower"), who remained locked up in the Tower, disappeared. Their fate has never been definitively resolved, although they are presumed to have died sometime in late 1483, either from disease or having been murdered. On Christmas Day 1483, Henry Tudor, whose mother had been plotting with Elizabeth Woodville against King Richard III, swore at Rennes Cathedral that he would marry the eldest daughter of Edward IV, Elizabeth, or her sister Cecily if marriage with Elizabeth was impossible for any reason, after he took the English throne. However, the uprising of the Tudor party, led by the Duke of Buckingham, (Note: The motives of Buckingham, who was generously endowed by Richard III upon his accession to the throne, are not clear. Some historians believe that the disappearance of the Princes in the Tower was the reason. At the same time, some researchers believe that after the execution of a number of representatives of the nobility and the alleged murder of princes on the orders of the King, the Duke "saw the light" and began to fear that he might become the next victim. However, there is another hypothesis explaining the reasons that led to the rebellion: the murder of the princes, committed by the Duke of Buckingham on his own initiative, aroused the indignation of Richard III, as a result of which the Duke was forced to flee and revolted.) failed even before Henry's oath in Rennes.

After the failure of Buckingham's rebellion, Richard III began negotiations with his brother's widow. On 1 March 1484, the king publicly swore that the daughters of Edward IV would not be harmed or molested; in addition, Richard III promised that they would not be imprisoned in the Tower or any other prison, that they would be placed "in respectable places of good name and reputation", and later be married to "men of noble birth" and given dowry lands with an annual income of 200 marks each. On the same day, the memorandum was delivered to the Queen Dowager, along with provisions. The princesses left the shelter and moved under the care of their "gracious uncle", who allocated them chambers in his palace. Tudor historian Edward Hall wrote that Richard III "made all the daughters of his brother solemnly arrive at his palace; as if with him new – familiar and fond of entertainment – they were supposed to forget ... the trauma inflicted on them and the tyranny that preceded this".

The guardianship that Richard III established over his nieces has become the subject of controversy in modern historiography, with opposing opinions about the King. Many researchers note that the daughters of Edward IV found themselves in an extremely difficult situation, as their legal rights were usurped, and their brothers were allegedly killed. Cecily witnessed a very unpleasant event for her: the betrothal of her former fiancé, the Scottish Duke of Rothesay, with her cousin Anne de la Pole, daughter of Elizabeth of York, Duchess of Suffolk. With the death in 1484 of Edward of Middleham, Prince of Wales, the only remaining legitimate son of Richard III, Anne de la Pole's brother John (Note: At the urging of his wife, Anne Neville, Richard III named his heir presumptive Edward, Earl of Warwick, their common nephew, the son of George, Duke of Clarence and Isabel Neville. After Anne's death, Richard made his other nephew John de la Pole the heir presumptive. None of these decisions had a legal basis and were not proclaimed publicly.) became the heir presumptive to the throne.

=== First marriage ===
After the daughters of Edward IV, recognised as bastards, arrived at court, various rumours began to circulate about their future fate: for example, it was alleged that Richard III was going to marry one of the elder nieces, Elizabeth (Note: Richard III was still married to Anne Neville, who allegedly died of tuberculosis in March 1485. Shortly after Anne's death, there were rumours that the King had poisoned his wife in order to marry his niece, Elizabeth of York.) or Cecily. In addition, Richard III considered marrying Cecily to someone below her in order to rule out her claim to the throne. The king's plans were carried out: when Henry Tudor landed in England with the intention of seizing the throne and marrying Cecily if Elizabeth was married to Richard III himself, he learned that Cecily was already married. Shortly before the defeat and death of Richard III, Cecily married, with her uncle's support, Ralph Scrope, the younger brother of the 6th Baron Scrope of Masham.

== Reign of Henry VII ==
=== At the Tudor court ===
In August 1485, Richard III was killed at the Battle of Bosworth. Henry Tudor became King Henry VII by right of conquest; his mother, Lady Margaret Beaufort, had previously made a pact with Queen Dowager Elizabeth whereby Cecily's older sister Elizabeth would marry the new king. Having gained the throne, Henry VII repealed the Titulus Regius act, which deprived the children of Edward IV of titles and rights to the throne; the act itself and all its copies were removed from the archives, as well as all the documents associated with them. Having received the crown and subsequently married Elizabeth, Henry VII also paid attention to her sisters: the princesses had to profitably marry the supporters of the young king, but without the opportunity to claim the throne. The fate of Cecily, the younger sister of the new Queen, had to be decided as soon as possible. The marriage of the princess to Ralph Scrope was annulled in 1486 as not being in the interests of the new Tudor dynasty.

As the queen's sister, Cecily came to play an important ceremonial role at court. She carried her first nephew, Arthur, Prince of Wales, during his christening on 24 September 1486. The nobles accompanying the princess at the ceremony were her half-brother Thomas Grey, 1st Marquess of Dorset and her paternal cousin John de la Pole, 1st Earl of Lincoln; Cecily's train was carried by the wife of the Marquess of Dorset, Cecily Bonville, 7th Baroness Harington and 2nd Baroness Bonville, whose family sided with the House of York in the Wars of the Roses. At the end of the baptism ceremony, Cecily, at the head of the solemn procession, returned the prince to the nursery, where she introduced him to his parents. On 25 November 1487, Cecily, the only one of all the queen's sisters, carried her train at her coronation in Westminster Abbey. By her position, she was the second woman at the ceremony (not counting the queen) after her aunt Catherine Woodville wife of the King's uncle Jasper Tudor, 1st Duke of Bedford; in addition, Cecily rode to and from the ceremony with her aunt in a carriage that immediately followed the queen's carriage. At the coronation banquet, Cecily and Catherine Woodville sat at the queen's table with the Archbishop of Canterbury, John Morton. It is known that during this period, like her other sisters, Cecily was paid a pension from the queen's funds, and she also had great privileges and great freedoms: thus, during walks, Cecily, who accompanied her sister as a Lady-in-waiting, was accompanied by her own ladies. Until her second marriage, Cecily served her sister as First Lady of the Bedchamber.

=== Second marriage ===
Among the nobility present at the Queen's coronation was John Welles, 1st Viscount Welles, heir to the ancient Welles family and younger half-brother of the King's mother, Lady Margaret Beaufort. (Note: John Welles was the son of Margaret Beauchamp of Bletso by his third marriage to the widower Lionel Welles, 6th Baron Welles; Lionel died at the Battle of Towton, in which he fought on the side of the House of Lancaster, for which he was posthumously stripped of his rights and titles by the House of York. The only son of Lionel from his first marriage, Richard Welles, was restored to his rights, but later rebelled against King Edward IV and, like his son Robert, was executed and posthumously deprived of his rights and titles. Thus, John Welles became his father's heir, although the property that once belonged to him was confiscated.) Although John himself and his family were supporters of the House of Lancaster, he was able to win the favour of Cecily's father at the end of his life and was among the people who guarded the body of the late King Edward IV at night. During the reign of Richard III, John was in opposition to the King: he participated in the failed Buckingham uprising, fled to Brittany, where Henry Tudor was hiding, and later won the throne with his help. Thanks to his service and family connections, John found himself in favour with Henry VII, who, immediately after his accession to the throne, appointed his uncle constable of two important castles, gave him several estates, and later returned John's father's possessions to John; in addition, John was not only restored to his father's baronial title, but also granted a new one –Viscount Wells.

There is no record of the time and circumstances of the marriage of Cecily and John Welles, who was older than the princess by about 20 years, but it happened before December 1487 or on New Year's Day 1488. Alison Weir writes that the marriage took place between 25 November and 31 December 1487; at the same time, she notes that the royal couple was present at the wedding. According to Mary Ann Everett Green, in December 1487 Cecily joined the Christmas celebrations at Palace of Placentia with her husband. On New Year's Eve, the Welles were present, among other representatives of the nobility and close associates of the king, at a dinner; Viscount Welles presented the king, as a gift from himself and his wife, with twenty shillings. At the banquet, the couple were separated: John was sitting at the table on the right side of the hall, and Cecily was at the head of the table on the left. It is not known for certain who was instrumental in the union of Cecily and John. Some historians believe that it was Henry VII who arranged the marriage of his wife's sister to his uncle in order to avoid Cecily's marriage to a more prominent representative of the nobility, since the princess became the legitimate heir to the throne in the event of the death of her sister Elizabeth and her children. On the other hand, Thomas Fuller wrote that Henry VII did not intend that Cecily be married at all, but she took matters into her own hands and chose the king's uncle as her husband, who after the conclusion of the marriage did not receive any more titles. In addition, Cecily was close to the king's mother, Lady Margaret Beaufort, (Note: Cecily often visited the King's mother in Collyweston.) who, in turn, was close to the Welles (Note: Lionel Welles, the third husband of Margaret Beauchamp of Bletso and father of John, was the only father Lady Margaret Beaufort ever knew: her own father, John Beaufort, 1st Duke of Somerset, died when she was, according to various sources, from one to three years old.) and could arrange this marriage. Regardless of who initiated the marriage, it was beneficial for both parties, as it strengthened the Lancastrian ties with the Yorkists: Cecily, who was the second contender for the throne from the House of York after her elder sister, found herself married to a man close to the king, who would not allow to draw her into political games against Henry VII.

After the celebrations at the beginning of 1488, traces of Cecily are lost for some time. She probably retired from the court and stayed in one of her husband's estates. Despite the large difference in age, the marriage was successful, and two daughters were born: Elizabeth, named after the queen, and Anne, named after Cecily's younger sister Anne of York. There is a version that the couple had three children, but there is no reliable data on the third child. It is known that Cecily was engaged in the upbringing and education of her children herself, so she stayed at home when her husband left for the court to fulfil his duties.

In 1491, John Welles was going to accompany his nephew on an expedition to France. A special act of Parliament delegated to her for this time the right to receive royal payments for her husband and use all his possessions. The king himself, in preparation for the campaign, signed a will in which Cecily's husband was named one of his fiefs. In 1492, John attended the funeral of Cecily's mother Queen Dowager Elizabeth Woodville, but the viscountess herself was absent, probably due to illness or pregnancy. Until 1498, little is known about Cecily's life. During this period (presumably in 1498) her eldest daughter Elizabeth Welles died, shortly before her betrothal with John Stanley, heir to George Stanley, 9th Baron Strange. It is known that in 1494 Cecily appeared in documents as a legatee under the will of her grandmother and namesake Cecily Neville, Dowager Duchess of York.

=== Widowhood ===
In 1498 (or 1499 according to other sources) Cecily, who was about thirty years old, was widowed. John fell ill with pleurisy – a disease that was not known about in England at that time and did not respond to conventional treatment. While on his deathbed, Viscount Welles signed a will, according to which he left all his property for life to his wife; he also requested in his will that he be buried where Cecily herself, the king, queen and the King's mother would deem fit. Welles died on 9 February 1498. Cecily organised a magnificent funeral for her husband and made some changes to the traditional burial ceremony: the viscount's body was delivered to Westminster by land, and not by river (bells rang along the entire route of the procession), and the coffin was accompanied by people of the highest ranks that etiquette allowed. The King's uncle's funeral was attended by the most notable lords: the Duke of Buckingham, the Earls of Northumberland, Derby, Essex and Devon. The memorial service was held at St Margaret's Church, Westminster, and was led by Thomas Savage, Bishop of London, and George Fasset, Abbot of Westminster.

Cecily's grief for her husband's death is said to have been considerable. A portion of the Viscount's will shows the relationship between the two:

Also I geve and bequethe to my dere beloved lady and wife Cecille, for terme of her lif, all my castelles, manors, landes and tenements, aswell suche as I have purchased as all odre during only her life, whome I trust above all oder, that if my goodes and catallis wilnot suffice for the performance of this my laste will, that she will thenne of the revenues of the profittes of my inheritance perform this my laste will. Also I will that a preste be founde for ever after my said wifes decease to sey masse daily for my sowle and all Cristen sowles at the said aulter of the yerely revenues of my purchased landes, and oder which my saide lady hath promised me faithfully to purchase to the same entent if my saide purchased landes suffice not therto. And I will yt suche residue as shall fortune to be of my goodes that my saide dere beloved lady and wife have theym to her owne use. And I make executors the saide Cecill, my dere beloved wife, and Sr Raynold Bray, knyght. . .

Mary Anne Everett Green writes that Cecily's youngest daughter, Anne Welles, died shortly after her father, but Rosemary Horrocks, in an entry on Cecily in the Oxford Biographical Dictionary, reports that Anne predeceased her father, and the fact that the girl is not mentioned in Viscount Welles' will supported this view; she was buried at Austin Friars, London. After the death of her husband and youngest daughter, Cecily decided to return to court to be with her older sister, with whom the princess had a very warm relationship. In addition to Elizabeth, Cecily was also patronized by the King's mother, Lady Margaret Beaufort, who helped the princess to protect her rights to the property of John Welles, which once belonged to his father, but became the object of claims by Lionel Welles' daughter from his first marriage. According to John's will, Cecily received for her use four mansions with the right to distribute parishes and beneficiaries (Advowson) and rent from other properties in Lincoln, as well as three estates with a total area of 1540 acres of meadow, pasture and forest land in Essex and rent from other properties in the same district.

The princess observed mourning for three years, after which she began to actively participate in the life of the court. She attended the wedding of her eldest nephew Arthur, Prince of Wales and Catherine of Aragon on 14 November 1501; witnesses report that Cecily, who had the honour of carrying the bride's train, was dressed in expensive fabrics, sewn in the latest fashion, and looked more like a marriageable girl than a widow. After the wedding, the court departed for the episcopal palace, where the main celebrations took place. During the jousting tournament, Cecily was present at the queen's gallery along with her sister, the newlyweds, princesses and other noble ladies. At the state dinner given the following Sunday, Cecily sat next to her sister the queen at "the most representative table in the chambers". It is also known that in May 1502, Cecily lent a certain amount of money to her sister.

In 1503, Cecily's position was shaken again when Queen Elizabeth died: she lost not only her sister, but also a close friend and patroness, on whose favour she could always count. According to Mary Anne Everett Green, the princess's grief was so great and prolonged that she could not attend the funeral, (Note: Of the four living sisters of Queen Elizabeth, only two attended her funeral: Anne and Catherine. Cecily was practically ill with grief, and Bridget, for unclear reasons, could not or did not want to leave Dartford Priory — the only documented case when the queen's youngest sister left the Priory was their mother's funeral in 1492.) and although a mourning wardrobe was sewn for her, Cecily's name did not appear on the lists of mourners. Alison Weir suggests that Cecily did not attend the royal sister's funeral because she was out of favour with the king, (Note: For unclear reasons, the late queen's next eldest sister, Anne, was also denied the honor of leading the mourners, and the next sister, Catherine, did so instead.) because of her new marriage concluded without his consent, and if the princess were allowed to see Elizabeth on her last journey, this would mean that Henry VII forgave Cecily.

=== Third marriage ===
Some time after her sister's death, Cecily entered into her third and last marriage: her chosen spouse was Sir Thomas Kyme of Friskney, a Lincolnshire squire –according to Mary Anne Everett Green, the English royal family had never known such an unequal union. The exact date of the marriage is unknown: various sources indicate 1502, the period between the spring of 1502 and the beginning of 1504 or a few months after the death of Cecily's sister, Queen Elizabeth of York in 1503, but before the meeting of Parliament in January 1504.

At a meeting of Parliament in January 1504, Cecily, along with William Willoughby, 11th Baron Willoughby de Eresby, and three other men who claimed the Welles inheritance, petitioned the king. Cecily knew well that Henry VII would be happy with any of her actions that would put the princess under suspicion, and therefore she only said that she wanted to choose a spouse, guided by the principle of "convenience, not profit". However, she feared that her marriage might be used as an excuse to dispossess her of the property that Cecily had used as Viscountess Welles, and that the king would feign displeasure with her affairs as an excuse to seize her lands. To avoid this, Cecily decided to give the king a bribe, which was a small part of her income, and a promise to return the rest of the property within ten years after her death; thus the bulk of her husband's inheritance was to remain in Cecily's possession. In her petition, referring to the restitution previously made on the Welles estates for her late husband, in fact, she asked to cancel this restitution, leaving her husband's possessions to her if she outlived the king, and for ten years to the heirs of Welles, if she died earlier. The reasons why the other Welles heirs joined the petition are not clear, but it is likely that they received some benefits from the princess herself who would have being lost if Cecily was dispossessed from her late husband's inheritance. The petition ended with a plea from all the signatories (Cecily, her third husband Thomas Kyme and the heirs of her second husband) for the mercy of the King.

The reaction of the king to the petition and subsequent events are described inconsistently by historians. Mary Ann Everett Green writes that Henry VII endorsed the petition, approving it with the words "Let it be as it pleases". However, Rosemary Horrocks, James Panton and Garland Okerlund point out that the king reacted very harshly to the petition and the fact that Cecily married without his knowledge and consent: he deprived the princess of all the property received under the will of John Welles, and removed her from the court. Horrocks and Okerlund write that, thanks to the intercession of Lady Margaret Beaufort, part of the Welles estate was returned to Cecily for life; also, the King's mother allowed the couple to settle in her own property, Collyweston Palace near Stamford. At the same time, Everett Green reports that the couple lived in one of the estates of Cecily's late husband, and they managed all the property jointly.

There are no sources regarding the family from which Cecily's third husband came, and his name appears only in one official document: the princess's petition to the king. At court, Sir Thomas was called "Kyme of Lincolnshire", without being called by name; he may have been descended from an old Kyme family, whose heirs, at the time of the marriage of Thomas and Cecily, owned Kyme Tower near Boston, Lincolnshire. (Note: The possessions of the Kyme family in 1421 passed to the Umfraville family through marriage. A representative of the Kyme family founded the priory of the same name; an estate and a river in Lincolnshire were also named after the Kyme family.) However, a number of sources report that the Kyme to whom Cecily was married came from the Isle of Wight, which can be indirectly confirmed by the fact that Cecily, according to several sources, died on that island; at the same time, sources linking the origin of the third husband of the princess with the Isle of Wight call him John, not Thomas.

Cecily spent the first years of her marriage to Kyme on the Isle of Wight, where their two children, Richard and Margaret, were born, who were granted no royal titles or styles; nor did they enjoy any royal favours, lands, or positions at court, or any public recognition. Richard was married to a certain Agnes and had a daughter by her; Margaret was married to John Weatherby, by whom she also had a daughter. Cecily's descendants from her third marriage, recorded in the enhanced copy (dated 1602) of the heraldic visitation of Hampshire (1576) made by Smythe, Rouge Dragon Pursuivant at the College of Arms, can be traced for a hundred years later. Some sources wrote that Cecily died childless – perhaps because neither her third marriage, nor the children born from this union, were recognised by the king: in documents relating to the death and burial of Cecily (diem clausit extremum), by order of the king, she is designated as "the late wife of the late John, Viscount Welles".

=== Later life and death ===
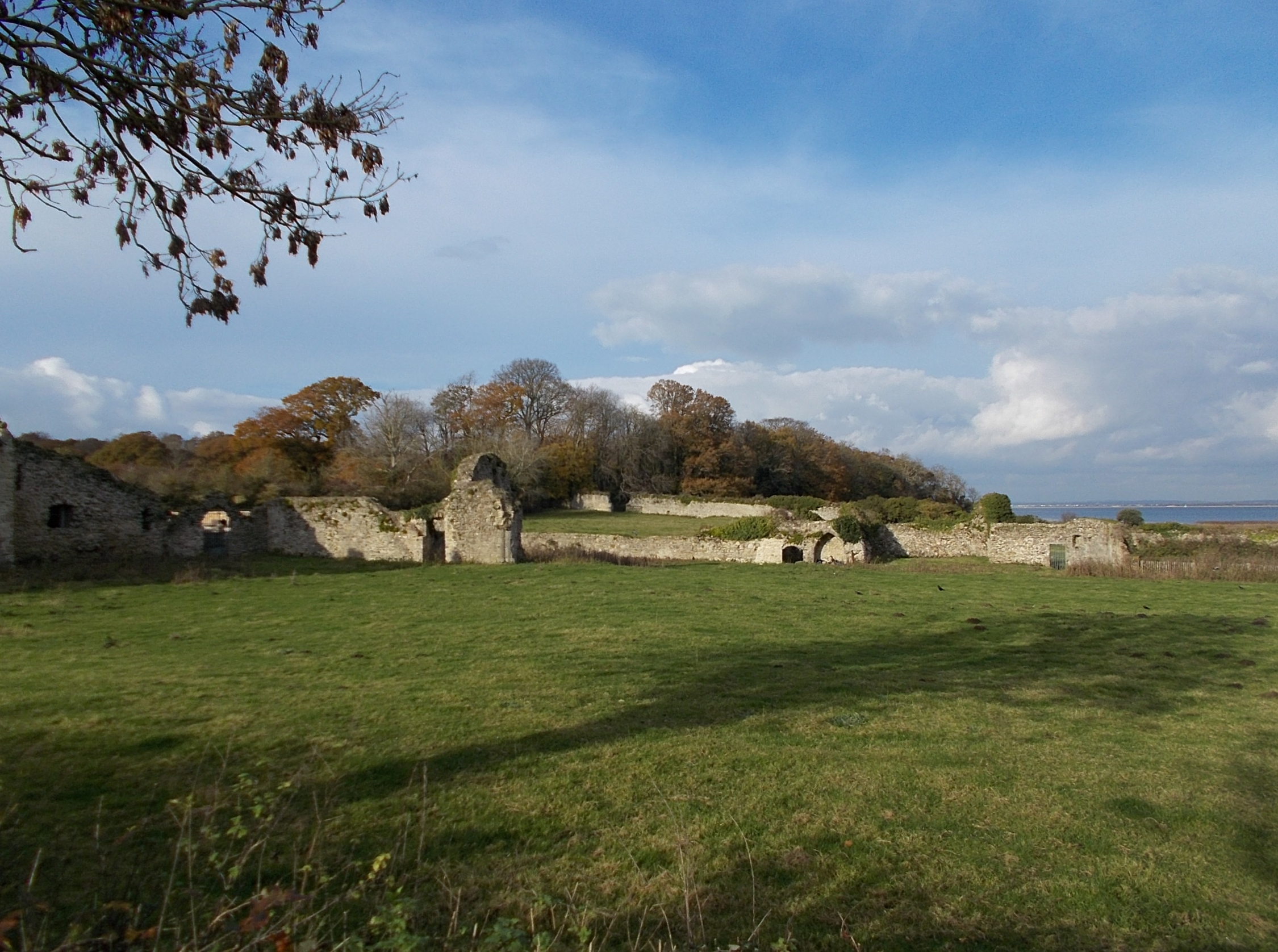
Ruins of the old Quarr abbey.

Little is known about the last years of Cecily's life, or about her life in her third marriage. Mary Anne Everett Green writes that after her marriage to Thomas Kyme, the princess did not live in luxury and did not receive any help from the king: the only funds associated with Cecily were allocated by Henry VII on 11 December 1506 to John Gysell for a trip to her. At the same time, in 1506, the King's mother, Lady Margaret Beaufort, reserved a room for Cecily at Croydon Mansion and later paid part of the cost of the princess's funeral.

Cecily died on 24 August 1507. The place of her death is not exactly determined. According to one version, she died on the Isle of Wight and was buried in the local Quarr Abbey; according to this version, the monument on the grave of the princess was destroyed during the reign of her nephew Henry VIII during the Dissolution of the monasteries, and no description of the monument has survived. However, Rosemary Horrox disputes this, pointing to evidence from the Beaufort account books that states Cecily died at Hatfield, Hertfordshire, after a three-week sojourn there, and was buried at a place that must have been local, known as "The Friars" (perhaps the friary at Kings Langley, associated with the House of York and where Edmund of Langley, 1st Duke of York, was buried).

== In art ==
A stained glass portrait of Cecily, originally from a larger "royal window" depicting Edward IV's family, is now in Glasgow's Burrell Collection. A modern copy has been placed in the much restored original group in the north transept of Canterbury Cathedral, and was also engraved in the book Acta Historica Reginarum Angliæ. These are, along with another window at Great Malvern Priory, Worcestershire, her only surviving memorials.
