= William Courtenay, 1st Earl of Devon =

English nobleman (1475–1511)

- Coat of arms
- Tenure: 10 May 1511 – 9 June 1511
- Predecessor: New creation
- Successor: Henry Courtenay, 1st Marquess of Exeter
- Born: 1475
- Died: 9 June 1511 (aged 35–36)
- Spouse: Catherine of York
- Issue: Henry Courtenay, 1st Marquess of Exeter; Edward Courtenay; Margaret Courtenay, Baroness Herbert

William Courtenay, 1st Earl of Devon (1475 – 9 June 1511), feudal baron of Okehampton and feudal baron of Plympton, was a member of the leading noble family of Devon. His principal seat was Tiverton Castle, Devon with further residences at Okehampton Castle and Colcombe Castle, also in that county.

== Origins ==
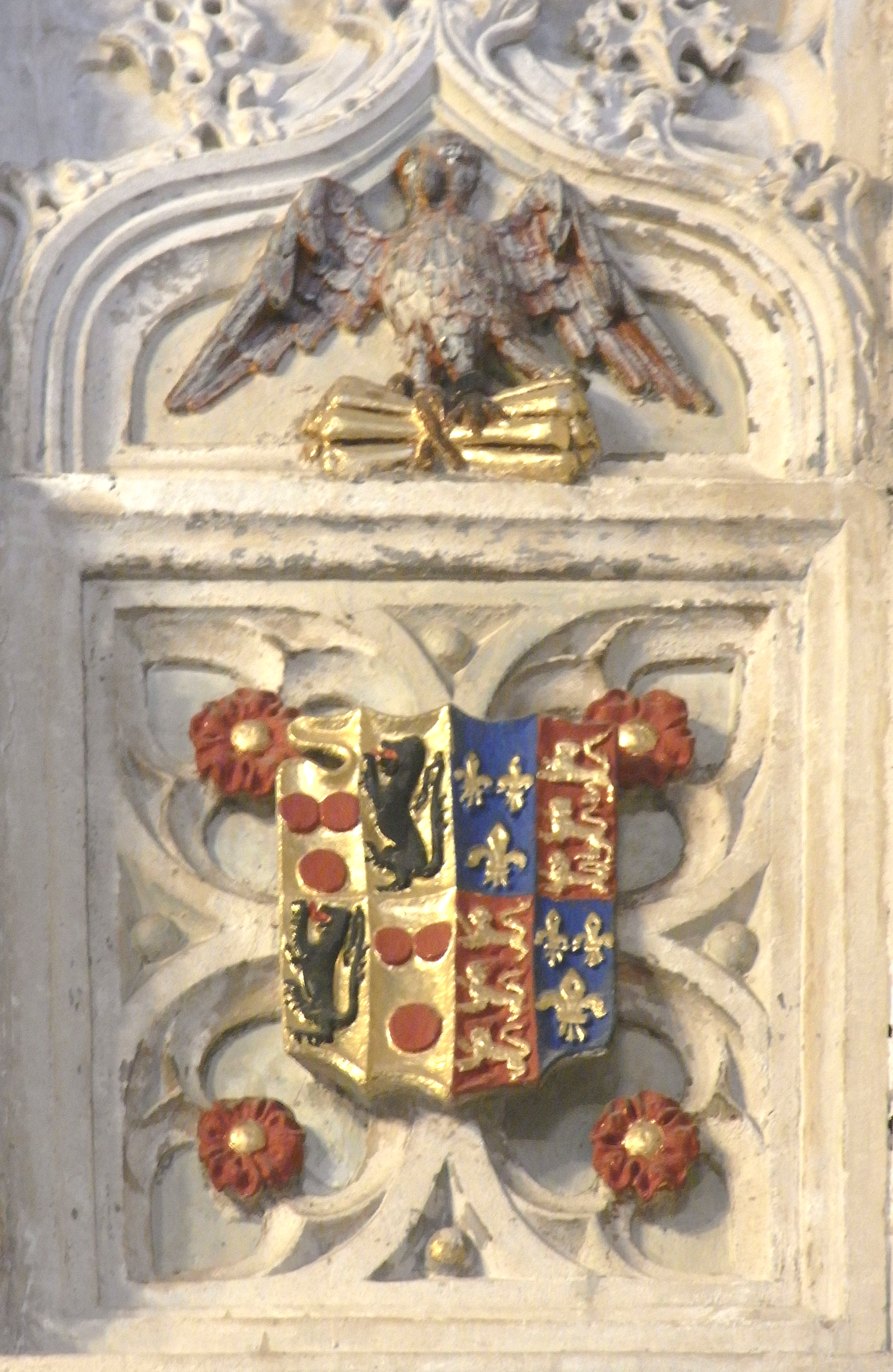
Arms and heraldic badge of William Courtenay, 1st Earl of Devon (1475–1511) sculpted on external wall of Speke Chantry, Exeter Cathedral, Devon, burial place of Sir John Speke (d. 1518) of Whitelackington, Somerset (The Redvers lions have been incorrectly restored as sable instead of azure.)

He was the son of Edward Courtenay, 1st Earl of Devon by his wife Elizabeth Courtenay, daughter of Sir Philip Courtenay (b. 1445) of Molland, 2nd son of Sir Philip Courtenay (18 January 1404 – 16 December 1463) of Powderham by Elizabeth Hungerford, daughter of Walter Hungerford, 1st Baron Hungerford (d. 1449). William's parents were thus distant cousins, sharing a common descent from Hugh Courtenay, 10th Earl of Devon (1303–1377).

== Career ==
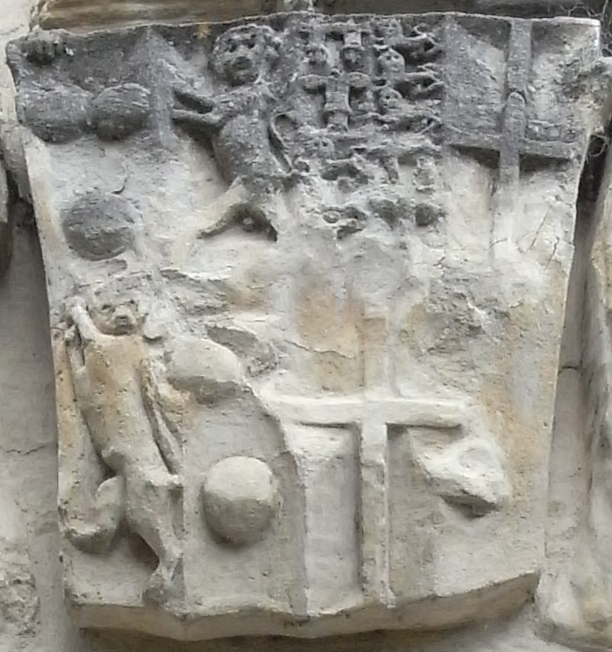
Arms of William Courtenay, 1st Earl of Devon (d. 1511) above the south porch of St Peter's Church, Tiverton (detail). The arms are Courtenay impaling the arms of his wife's father as Duke of York: Quarterly 1st: Royal arms of Lionel, Duke of Clarence; second and third, Elizabeth de Burgh, 4th Countess of Ulster; fourth, Edmund Mortimer, 3rd Earl of March

William was a supporter of King Henry VII (1485–1509), the first of the Tudors, who made him a Knight Bachelor at the coronation of Queen Elizabeth on 25 November 1487. He also served in the royal army as a Captain and assisted his father in the defeat of the pretender Perkin Warbeck at the siege of Exeter in 1497, which secured the Tudor succession at last.

== Attainder ==
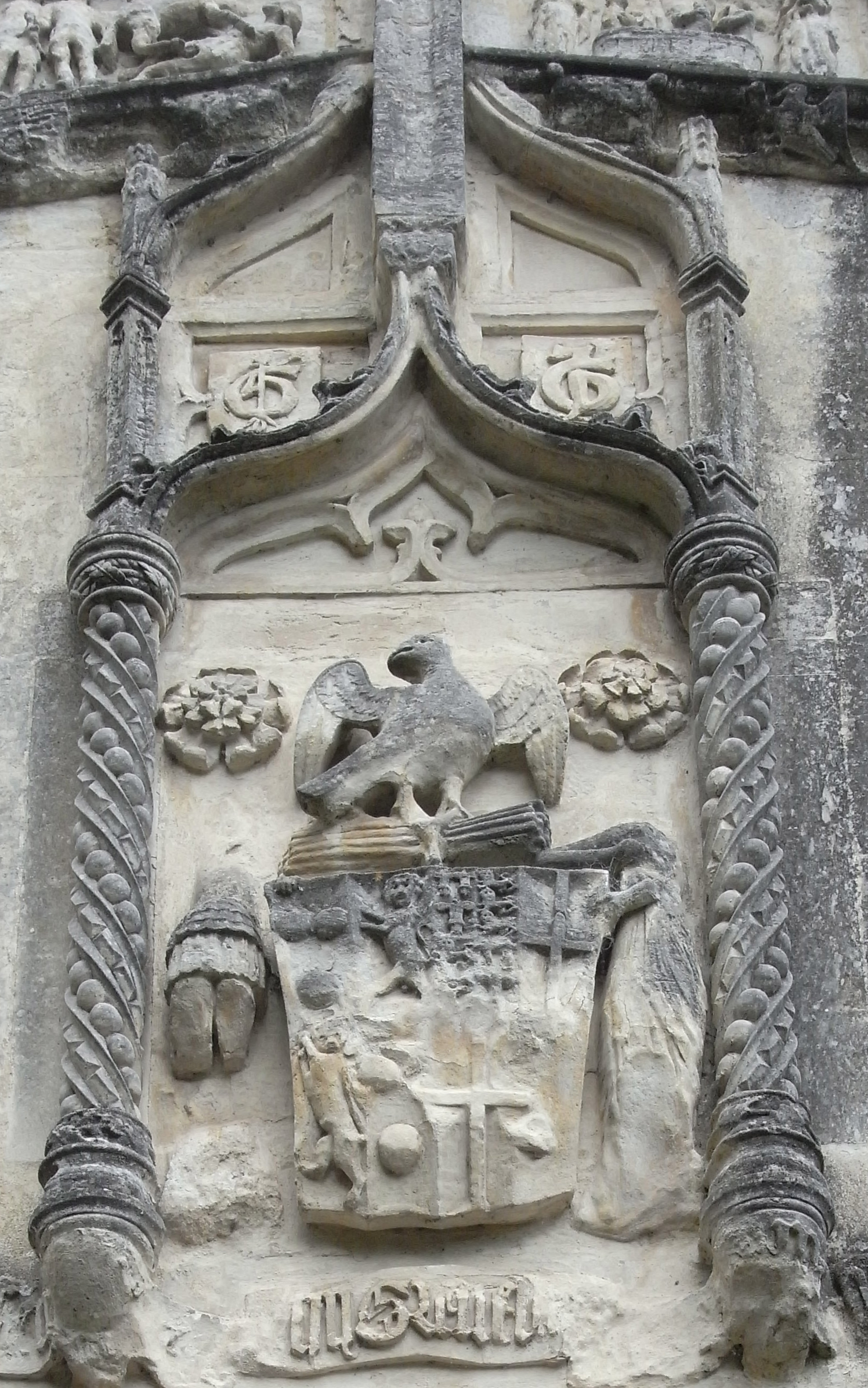
Arms of William Courtenay, 1st Earl of Devon (d.1511) above the south porch of St Peter's Church, Tiverton.

However, William fell out of favour. King Henry VII discovered that he had joined in the conspiracy to crown Edmund de la Pole, 3rd Duke of Suffolk (d. 1513), the last Yorkist claimant. For his complicity, the king attainted and imprisoned him in the Tower of London in February 1504, and so made him incapable of inheritance.

== Pardon and restoration ==
Released from prison by Henry VIII (1509–1547), Courtenay received a pardon and the restoration of his rights and privileges as a sword bearer at the coronation on 24 June 1509. It is a matter of debate as to whether he lived long enough to have been restored in his honours formally. Certain sources, however, maintain that he assumed the full titles and lands of the earldom on 10 May 1511, after jousting in a tournament with the king, his cousin Sir Thomas Knyvett, and Sir William Nevill.

== Marriage and issue ==
In October 1495 he married Catherine of York, the sixth daughter of King Edward IV and Elizabeth Woodville and sister to the then-queen. William and Catherine had three children:

- Henry Courtenay, 1st Marquess of Exeter (c. 1496 – 9 January 1539) married (1) Elizabeth Grey, Viscountess Lisle and (2) Gertrude Blount.
- Lady Margaret Courtenay (c. 1499 – before 1526) married Henry Somerset, 2nd Earl of Worcester.
- Edward Courtenay (1497 – 12 July 1502)

=== Monument to daughter ===
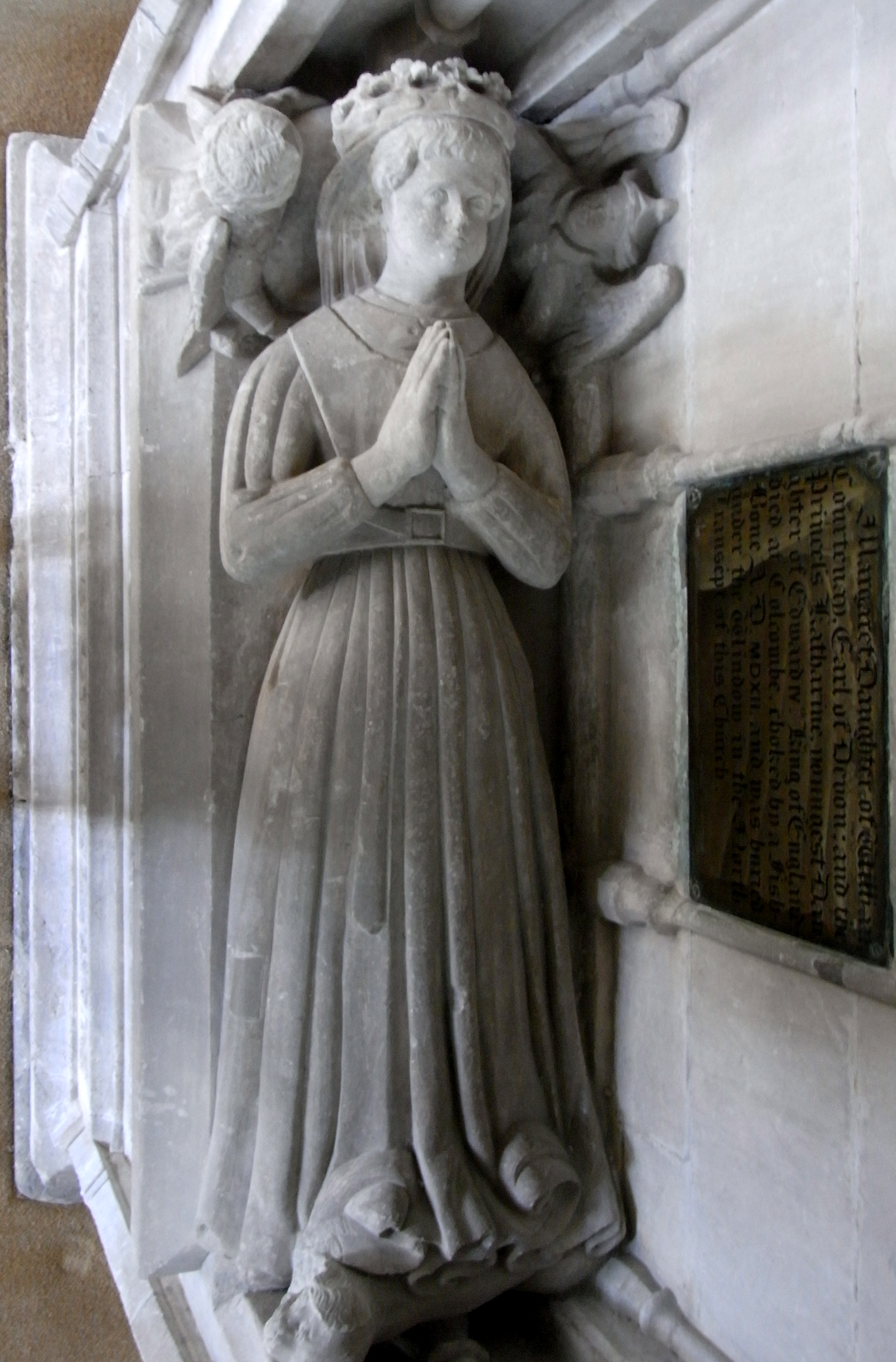
Effigy said by erroneous tradition to represent Margaret I Courtenay (d. 1512), "little choke-a-bone", daughter of William Courtenay, who died as an infant, having choked on a fish-bone at Colcombe Castle. Colyton Church, Devon

An effigy tradition identifies as "little choke-a-bone", Margaret Courtenay (d. 1512), an infant daughter of William Courtenay, 1st Earl of Devon (1475–1511) by his wife Princess Catherine of York (d. 1527), the sixth daughter of King Edward IV (1461–1483) exists in Colyton Church in Devon. The effigy is only about 3 feet in length, much smaller than usual for an adult. The face and head were renewed in 1907, and is said to have been based on the sculptor's own infant daughter. One of the Courtenay seats was Colcombe Castle within the parish of Colyton. A 19th-century brass tablet above is inscribed: "Margaret, daughter of William Courtenay Earl of Devon and the Princess Katharine youngest daughter of Edward IVth King of England, died at Colcombe choked by a fish-bone AD MDXII and was buried under the window in the north transept of this church".

The effigy appears to contain errors—records show that Margaret was still alive and serving Princess Mary Tudor, daughter of Henry VIII, on 2 July 1520. However, another nobleman from that period—Thomas Howard, 2nd Duke of Norfolk—had named two living sons Thomas and two living daughters Elizabeth; hence, it is possible the Courtenay family had two daughters named Margaret who lived at the same time.

==== Heraldry ====
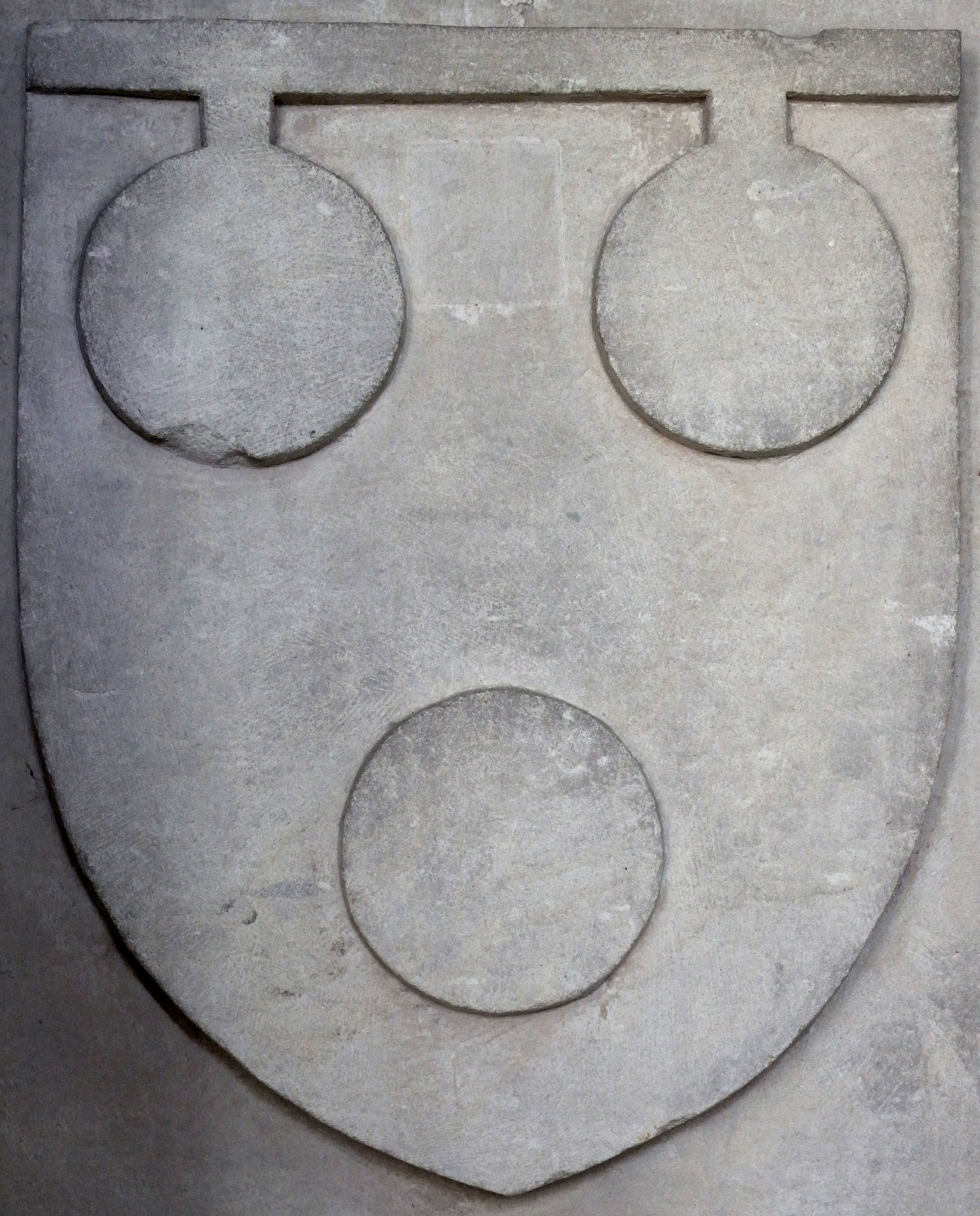
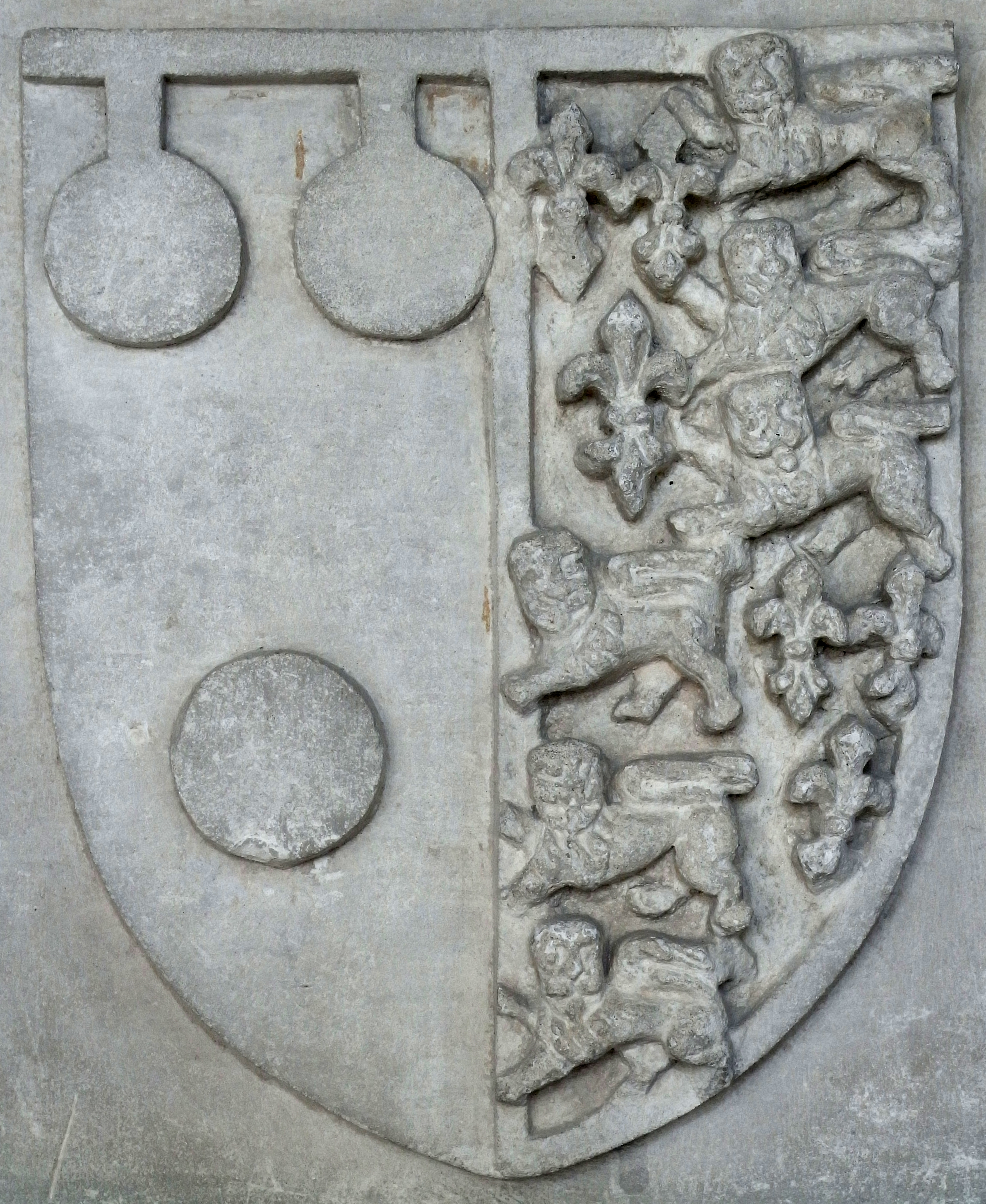
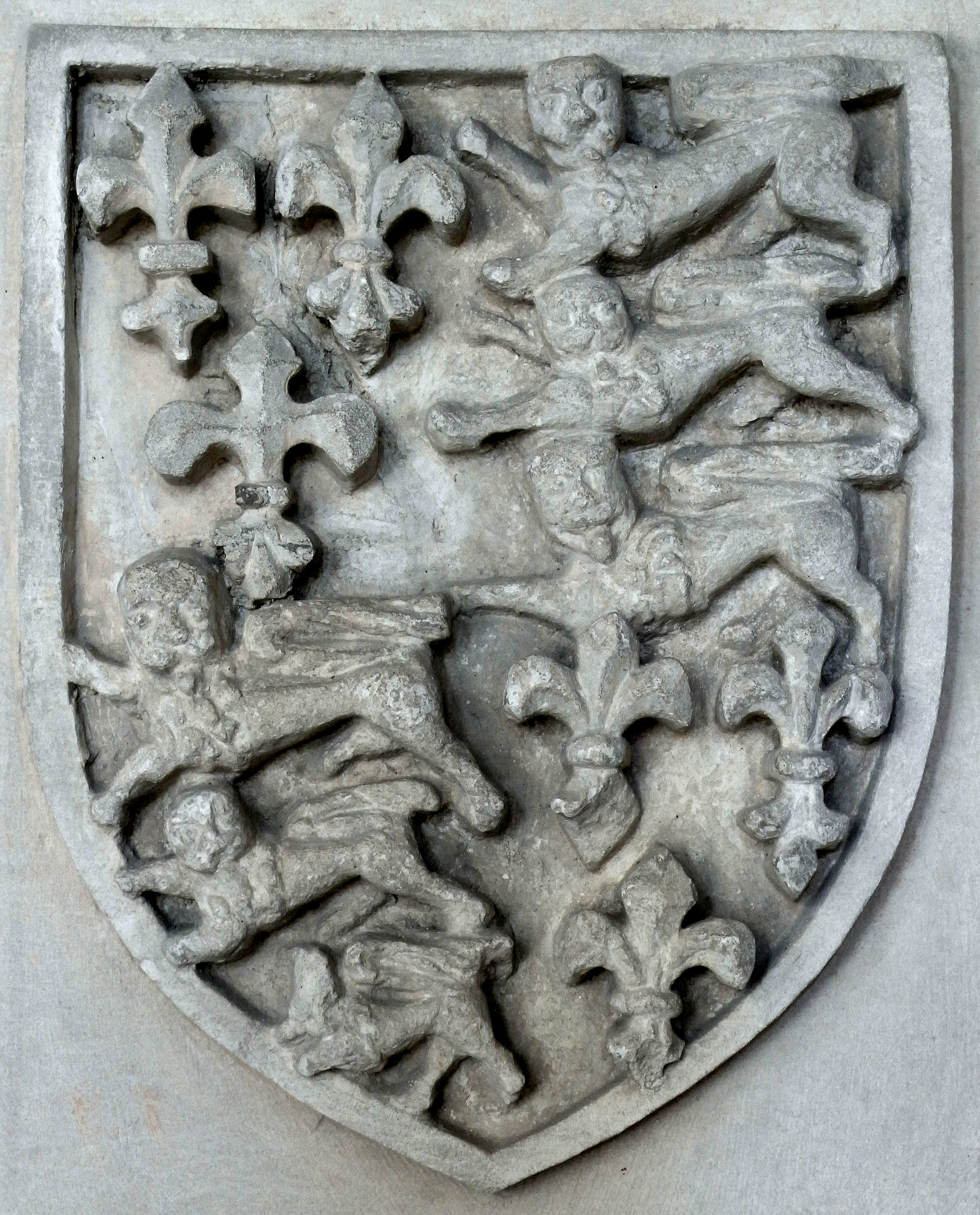
Arrangement of heraldic escutcheons above female effigy in Colyton Church. left arms of Courtenay (without border); centre: arms of Courtenay (without border) impaling royal arms of England (with border); right: royal arms of England (with border). The interpretation of the existence or otherwise of a heraldic bordure is significant to the correct identification of the effigy.

Three sculpted heraldic shields of arms exist above the effigy, showing the arms of Courtenay, Courtenay impaling the royal arms of England and the royal arms of England. Later authorities have suggested, on the basis of the monument's heraldry, the effigy to be the wife of Thomas Courtenay, 5th/13th Earl of Devon (1414–1458), namely Lady Margaret Beaufort (c. 1409 – 1449), daughter of John Beaufort, 1st Marquess of Somerset, 1st Marquess of Dorset (1373–1410), KG (later only 1st Earl of Somerset) (the first of the four illegitimate children of John of Gaunt, 1st Duke of Lancaster (4th son of King Edward III), and his mistress Katherine Swynford, later his wife) by his wife Margaret Holland. The basis of this re-attribution is the belief that the "royal arms" shown are not the arms of King Edward IV, but those of Beaufort. The arms of Beaufort are the royal arms of England differenced within a bordure compony argent and azure.

== Death and burial ==
He died of pleurisy on 9 June 1511 and was buried by a royal warrant at Blackfriars, London.

== Sources ==
- G.E. Cokayne, Complete Peerage new ed. (1910–59)
- Great Britain, and Richard Bligh. New Reports of Cases Heard in the House of Lords, On Appeals and Writs of Error. London: Saunders and Benning, 1829. googlebooks Retrieved 26 January 2008
- thepeerage.com Accessed 26 January 2008
- familysearch.org Accessed 26 January 2008

Peerage of England
New creation	Earl of Devon; 4th creation 1511	Succeeded by Henry Courtenay
