= Inés de Venegas =

Inés de Venegas, in English often called Agnes de Vanegas (born before 1501 - died before February 1515), was a Spanish-English courtier. She served as the chamberer of Catherine of Aragon. She was married to William Blount, 4th Baron Mountjoy, and the stepmother of Gertrude Courtenay, Marchioness of Exeter.

== Life and career ==
Inez de Venegas was the daughter of Ynes (Agnes) de Venegas, also known as Isabel de Vanegas, (died 1504), who was the governess (ama) and nurse of Catherine of Aragon. In October 1501, she and her mother and her sisters Maria and Theresa accompanied Catherine of Aragon to England. The mother and three daughters were all employed as chamberers, responsible for Catherine's wardrobe and her intimate care and needs.

Catherine's closest Spanish entourage were named as the chamberers Inez de Venegas the elder, her daughters Maria, Theresa and Inez de Venegas the younger; the ladies-in-waiting Maria de Salinas, Catalina de Montoya and Maria de Rojas, the chief lady-in-waiting Elvira Manuel and her confessor Alessandro Geraldini, aside from the Spanish ambassador Rodrigo de Puebla.

Inés de Venegas belonged to the few Spanish courtiers to remain in England during Catherine's widowhood after Arthur. Most of Catherine's Spanish retainers were fired during these years because of financial issues, but the Venegas women were considered so vital to Catherine that her mother queen Isabella of Castile paid their wages until her death.

In May 1509 Inés de Venegas participated in the royal funeral of king Henry VII as a part of Catherine's retinue. In June 1509, she married William Blount, 4th Baron Mountjoy. She became the stepmother of Gertrude Courtenay, Marchioness of Exeter. The date of death of Inez de Venegas is unknown, however, as William had remarried by 1515 and was not divorced from Inez, her death was before February 1515.
