= Henry Courtenay, 1st Marquess of Exeter =

English nobleman and politician

The Most Honorable The Marquess of Exeter KG PC
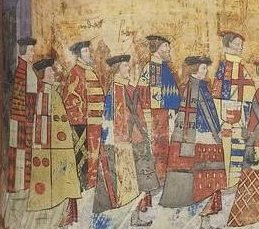
- Henry Courtenay, shown 2nd from left wearing a mantle displaying his arms, detail from procession of Garter Knights in the Black Book of the Garter, c.1535, Royal Collection, Windsor
- Other titles: Earl of Devon
- Born: c. 1498; Carmarthen, Wales
- Died: 9 December 1538 (aged 39–40); Tower of London, London, England
- Spouses: Elizabeth Grey (m. 1515; died 1519) Gertrude Courtenay (m. 1519)
- Issue: Edward Courtenay, 1st Earl of Devon
- Parents: William Courtenay, 1st Earl of Devon; Catherine of York

Arms of Henry Courtenay, 10th Earl of Devon, KG: Quarterly, 1st: Royal arms of England (for his father-in-law King Edward IV), within a bordure counter-changed; 2 & 3: Courtenay; 4: Redvers

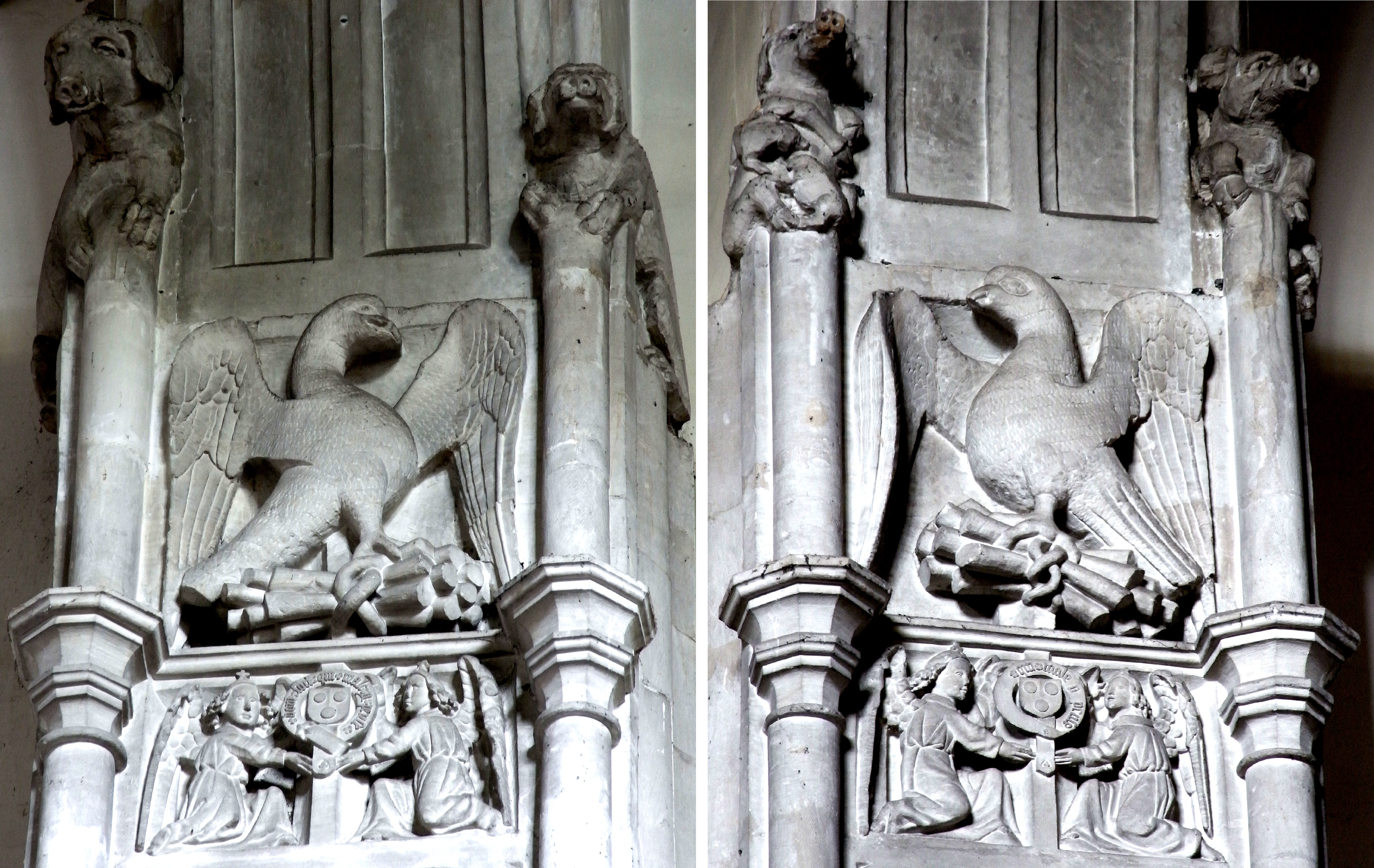
Pair of heraldic devices either of Henry Courtenay, 1st Marquess of Exeter (1498–1539), KG, or of his grandfather Edward Courtenay, 1st Earl of Devon (died 1509), KG, north and south sides of top of chancel arch, St Peter's Church, Tiverton. Showing the arms of Courtenay: Or, three torteaux circumscribed by the Garter, with angel supporters. Above is the heraldic badge of the Courtenay falcon and faggot and on top of each column is shown a Courtenay boar. The only surviving Courtenay monument within the church situated next to their historic seat of Tiverton Castle

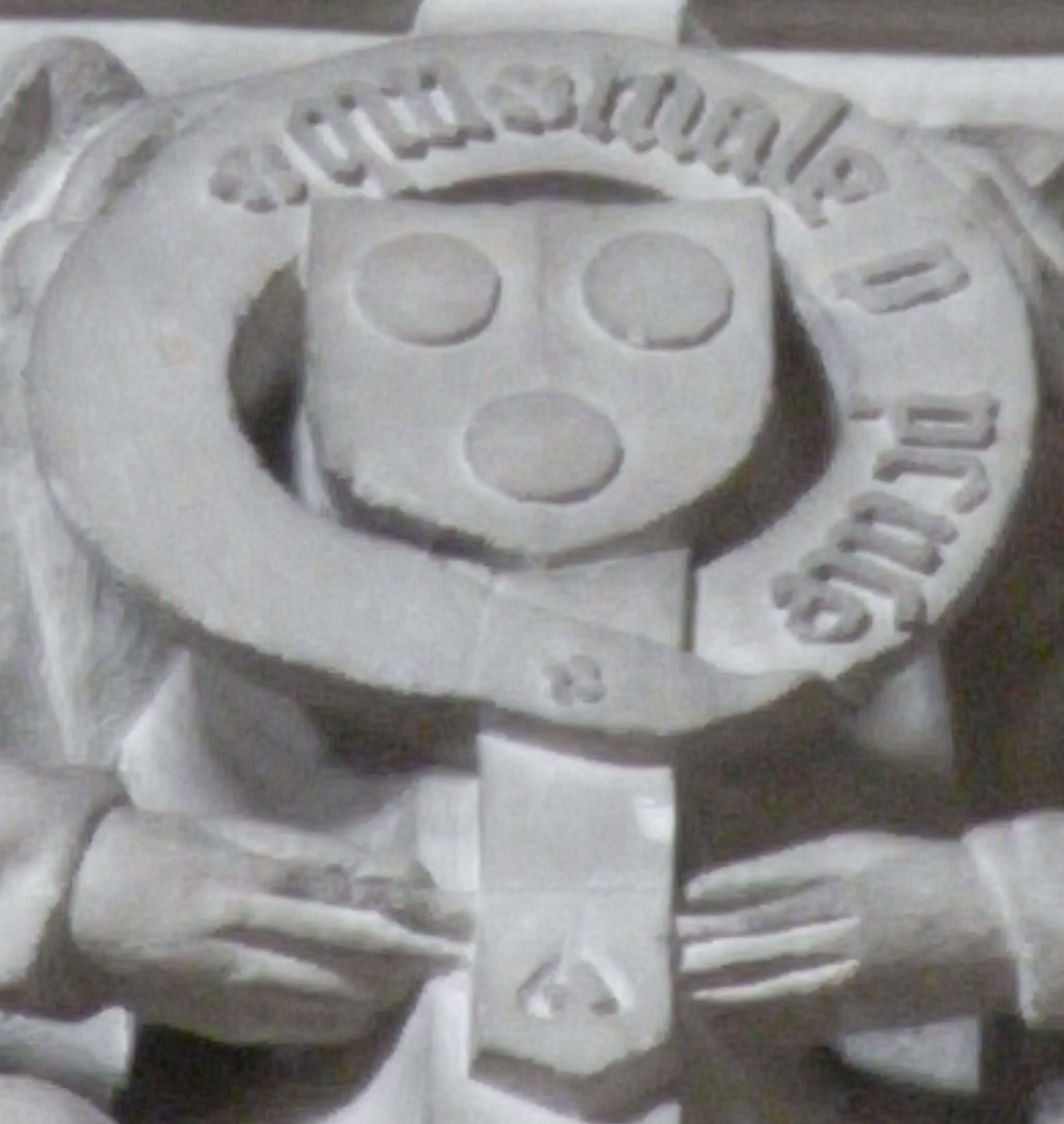
Within a Garter inscribed (honi soit) qui mal y pense an escutcheon of the arms either of Henry Courtenay, 1st Marquess of Exeter (1498–1539), KG, or of his grandfather Edward Courtenay, 1st Earl of Devon (died 1509), KG: Or, three torteaux, one of a pair facing each other on tops of chancel arch, Tiverton Church, Devon

Henry Courtenay, 1st Marquess of Exeter, 2nd Earl of Devon (c. 1498 – 9 December 1538), feudal baron of Okehampton, feudal baron of Plympton, of Tiverton Castle, Okehampton Castle and Colcombe Castle all in Devon, was a grandson of King Edward IV, nephew of the queen consort, Elizabeth of York and a first cousin of King Henry VIII.

Henry Courtenay was a close friend of Henry VIII, having "been brought up of a child with his grace in his chamber". After initially supporting the dissolution of the monasteries and helping suppress protests, he became convinced against the cruelty of the measures and the new religion; he was executed under Henry for corresponding with Cardinal Pole.

== Origins ==
He was born in about 1498, the first and only surviving son and heir of William Courtenay, 1st Earl of Devon (1475–1511) by his wife Princess Catherine of York (died 1527), the sixth daughter of King Edward IV by his wife Elizabeth Woodville. His maternal first cousins therefore included King Henry VIII.

== Early life ==
At the time of his birth in 1498, his paternal grandfather Edward Courtenay, 1st Earl of Devon (died 1509) was still living and Henry's father William Courtenay was his eldest son and heir apparent. In 1504, during the reign of the Tudor King Henry VII, William Courtenay was accused of maintaining correspondence with Edmund de la Pole, 3rd Duke of Suffolk, the leading Yorkist claimant to the throne, and the king ordered him incarcerated in the Tower of London and he was attainted in February 1504, which disabled him from inheriting his father's earldom.

King Henry VII died on 22 April 1509 closely followed by Edward Courtenay, 1st Earl of Devon, on 28 May 1509. The king was succeeded by his son King Henry VIII, the nephew of William Courtenay's wife, who released William from the Tower. On 24 June 1509, William took part in the coronation of Henry VIII and carried the Third Sword during the ceremony. William enjoyed some favour with Henry VIII who reversed his attainder on 9 May 1511 and created him Earl of Devon on 10 May 1511, with the usual remainder to heirs male of his body. William died a month later on 9 June 1511, before completing his official investiture as an earl, but was by royal warrant buried with the honours due to an earl. He left Henry Courtenay as his heir.

== Earl of Devon ==
On the death of his father on 9 June 1511, Henry succeeded to his father's earldom of 1511, in accordance with the patent. But in 1512 he also succeeded to his grandfather's earldom of 1485, having obtained from Parliament in December 1512 a (more formal) reversal of his father's 1504 attainder.

His first cousin King Henry VIII was at the time involved in the War of the League of Cambrai against King Louis XII of France. The new earl of Devon experienced his first battles in 1513 as second captain of a man-of-war.

He seems to have gained the further favour of his royal cousin during the 1510s. He became a gentleman of the privy chamber and member of the Privy Council in 1520. In June 1520 he accompanied Henry VIII to Calais for his meeting with King Francis I of France at the Field of the Cloth of Gold and became one of the debauched and athletic friends of the king's, frequently going on hunting trips with the king and his favourite, Charles Brandon, 1st Duke of Suffolk.

In 1521 Edward Stafford, 3rd Duke of Buckingham, KG, was executed on charges of treason, and a place having become vacant in the Order, the king appointed Courtenay a Knight of the Garter on 9 June 1521 and granted him part of Stafford's forfeited lands and properties. He was granted the administrations of the vacant dukedoms of Exeter, Somerset, and Cornwall over the following two years. In April 1522 he was made keeper of Burling Park in Kent, during which period he reached his greatest height of power in the king's inner council. It was possibly at that time he met the Boleyn family. He continued in the traditional hereditary offices of the Courtenays, as warden of the Stannaries and as the high steward of the Duchy of Cornwall from May 1523. He was appointed constable of the royal residence of Windsor Castle in 1525.

== Marquess of Exeter ==
On 18 June 1525 Henry VIII created Henry Courtenay, as "Earl of Devon, Dominus of Okehampton and Plympton" (i.e. feudal baron of Okehampton and feudal baron of Plympton), Marquess of Exeter. At that time Francis I of France had lost the Battle of Pavia and was held captive by Charles V, Holy Roman Emperor. Henry VIII sent the new Marquess of Exeter to secure an agreement with French regent Louise of Savoy and to pledge the assistance of the English king in negotiations for the return of Francis.

The Marquess of Exeter further served the interests of the King in the proceedings for the annulment of his marriage to Catherine of Aragon and signed the letter to Pope Clement VII in that regard. He was placed second to the King at the Privy Council at which Cardinal Thomas Wolsey was charged with treason and signed the documents for his prosecution. He served as a commissioner for the formal deposition of Catherine in 1533.

During the preparation of his Dissolution of the Monasteries, Henry VIII granted to Courtenay the stewardship of several monasteries in 1535, which placed him in a key position for the forthcoming process. In 1536 Courtenay was a commissioner at the trial of Anne Boleyn, the king's second wife who had been accused of adultery, incest, and high treason.

Courtenay and Charles Brandon, 1st Duke of Suffolk were sent into Yorkshire to put down the Pilgrimage of Grace, a Roman Catholic uprising that broke out on 15 October 1536. Courtenay failed in this task and retreated to Devonshire. On 15 May 1537, he served as High Steward at the trial for treason of Thomas Darcy, 1st Baron Darcy de Darcy, charged with being a leader of the rebellion.

== Downfall and death ==
By the late 1530s, Courtenay was an influential figure at court and was administering most of western England in his own name and in that of King Henry VIII. He was also a political rival of Thomas Cromwell and the two men reportedly had little sympathy for each other.

Following the Reformation, Courtenay's second wife, Gertrude Blount, remained a Roman Catholic. She had supported Elizabeth Barton to her downfall and continued to maintain correspondence with the Catholic former queen Catherine to her death. Her father had served as Queen Catherine's chamberlain, and a stepmother had been one of her Spanish attendants while she was Princess of Wales. Cromwell used these connections to point suspicion at Courtenay's loyalties.

Being a powerful landowner in the west country did not make him blind to the sufferings of his tenants. Many lay and clerical alike were turned out of their lands and homes by the Dissolution of the Monasteries and Courtenay came to hate Vicar-General Cromwell and his Protestantism, whose "measures ... became so obnoxious to him that he drifted into a treasonable conspiracy with the Pole family". He joined the Catholic Poles in the Western Rebellion during 1538 and endeavoured to raise the men of Devon and Cornwall. At St Keverne on the Lizard peninsula of Cornwall a painted banner was reportedly created which was taken around local villages and called for the population to revolt.

However, Madeleine Hope Dodds argues that there never was a conspiracy. "They were less a political party than a group of friends, who loved the old Faith, hated Cromwell, and longed for a change of policy. They met and talked treason and sang political songs... They did not trouble themselves about anything so strenuous and intellectual as a plot." Bernard Burke says Exeter fell victim to the king's jealousy of the Poles.

Courtenay was found to be in correspondence with the self-exiled Cardinal Reginald Pole. Geoffrey Pole, younger brother of the Cardinal, came to London with the information that a Roman Catholic conspiracy was in the making. Both Poles were accused of heading this conspiracy and Cromwell convinced the king that Courtenay was a part of it. Perhaps anticipating the end, he wrote a will on 25 September 1538.

In early November 1538, Courtenay with his wife and son Edward Courtenay were arrested and incarcerated in the Tower of London. On 3 December 1538 Courtenay was put on trial by his peers in Westminster Hall, although there was little evidence for his involvement in the so-called Exeter Conspiracy. He was found guilty because of his correspondence with Cardinal Pole in Rome. Courtenay was beheaded with a sword on Tower Hill on 9 December 1538, with Henry Pole, 1st Baron Montagu, who was the elder brother of both the Cardinal and Geoffrey, together with their cousin Edward Neville. He was attainted and the Earldom of Devon became forfeit, and his lands in Cornwall were annexed by the Duchy of Cornwall.

His wife Gertrude and his son Edward were both attainted in 1539, when her lands (including estates inherited from Sir William Say) were forfeited to the Crown. She was released in 1540 and maintained a friendship with the king's elder daughter, Mary, for the rest of her life. Following Mary's accession, on her orders his son Edward Courtenay was released on 3 August 1553, and thereafter became a suitor for her marriage.

== Marriages and children ==
Henry Courtenay married twice:

- First, shortly after June 1515, to Elizabeth Grey, suo jure Viscountess Lisle (1505–1519), the only child and sole heiress of John Grey, 2nd Viscount Lisle by his wife Muriel Howard, daughter of Thomas Howard, 2nd Duke of Norfolk. Elizabeth had been the ward of Charles Brandon, later 1st Duke of Suffolk, and was betrothed to him when she was only eight years old. The betrothal was broken when Brandon married Mary Tudor, sister to Henry VIII. At this time, she became ward of Catherine of York, who betrothed Elizabeth to her son, Henry Courtenay. She died soon after the marriage without children.
- Secondly, on 25 October 1519, he married Gertrude Blount (c.1499/1502 – 25 September 1558), a daughter of William Blount, 4th Baron Mountjoy. In October 1537, Lady Exeter was a courtier, serving as godmother to Princess Elizabeth and representing Princess Mary at the pre-funeral ceremonies for Queen Jane Seymour at Hampton Court Palace. She was arrested on 5 November 1538 with her husband and was attainted as his widow in July 1539, and imprisoned for several years until her attainder was reversed by Queen Mary, to whom she became a lady in waiting. She died on 25 September 1558 and was buried in Wimborne Minster in Dorset. By Gertrude Blount he had two sons:
  - Henry Courtenay, who died young;
  - Edward Courtenay, 1st Earl of Devon (c. 1527 – 18 September 1556), eldest surviving son, who having spent 15 years incarcerated in the Tower of London was released on 3 August 1553, a few days after the accession of Queen Mary to the throne. She created him Earl of Devon on 3 September 1553.

== Bibliography ==
- Alison Weir, Henry VIII (London, 1998)
- Cokayne, G. E. (1916). Gibbs, Vicary & Doubleday, H. Arthur (eds.). The Complete Peerage of England, Scotland, Ireland, Great Britain and the United Kingdom, extant, extinct or dormant (Dacre to Dysart). Vol. 4 (2nd ed.). London: The St Catherine Press.

Court offices
Preceded by Unknown	Lord Warden of the Stannaries; 1523 – 1538	Succeeded by John Russell, 1st Baron Russell
Peerage of England
New creation	Marquess of Exeter; 1525–1538	Forfeit
Preceded by William Courtenay	Earl of Devon; 1511–1538	Forfeit
