= Gertrude Courtenay, Marchioness of Exeter =

English noblewoman

Gertrude Courtenay
- Born: Gertrude Blount c.1499/1502
- Died: 25 September 1558
- Buried: Wimborne Minster, Dorset
- Noble family: Blount
- Spouse: Henry Courtenay, 1st Marquess of Exeter (m. 1519)
- Issue: Edward Courtenay, 1st Earl of Devon
- Father: William Blount, 4th Baron Mountjoy
- Mother: Elisabeth Say

Gertrude Courtenay, Marchioness of Exeter, (née Blount; c.1499/1502 – 25 September 1558) was an English Marchioness, married to Henry Courtenay, 1st Marquess of Exeter and a member of the courts of Henry VIII of England and Mary I of England. She was a godmother to the future Elizabeth I.

== Family ==
Gertrude was the daughter of William Blount, 4th Baron Mountjoy, Katherine of Aragon's chamberlain, and his first wife Elisabeth Say, the daughter and coheiress to Sir William Say. Blount was married 4 times and left 6 children from his marriages. One of Gertrude's step-mothers was Inés de Venegas, one of Catherine of Aragon's original Spanish ladies-in-waiting.

Gertrude was raised as a devout Catholic.

In 1519 Gertrude married Henry Courtenay, 1st Marquess of Exeter. He was a rising star within the privy chamber and close friend and first cousin of Henry VIII's, having "been brought up of a child with his grace in his chamber." The couple lived in their primary residence of West Horsley Place during the 1530s.

== Marchioness of Exeter ==
As Marchioness of Exeter, Gertrude was one of Queen Catherine of Aragon's attendants at the Field of the Cloth of Gold near Calais in 1520, where she participated in courtly pageants with the king’s sister, Mary, Dowager Queen of France, and the sisters Mary and Anne Boleyn, while her husband took part in jousting.

Gertrude and her husband were held in high favour at the English royal court and in 1525, Courtenay was created Marquess of Exeter. In May 1529, the Courtenay's were given prominent roles in jousts and dances, with Gertrude dancing hand in hand with Princess Mary. Gertrude also presented the Princess to the French Ambassador.

Gertrude fell ill of the sweating sickness, in 1528, but survived.

Gertrude was amongst a group of high ranking noblewomen who openly opposed King Henry VIII's divorce from Catherine of Aragon. Others were Mary Tudor, Duchess of Suffolk and the King's sister; Elizabeth Howard, Duchess of Norfolk; Anne Grey, Baroness Hussey and Margaret Pole, Countess of Salisbury. She continued her correspondence with Catherine, even after the Queen had been banished from court, and was forbidden from visiting her. In September 1533 Gertrude was described in a letter written by the Imperial Ambassador, Eustache Chapuys, as "the sole consolation of the Queen and Princess." When Chapuys was later imprisoned, Gertrude took a risk by visiting him in person, wearing a disguise, to warn him that Henry was considering executing Catherine and Mary.

Despite her earlier support of Catherine, at the coronation of Anne Boleyn in 1533, Gertrude was a member of the litter of "several ladies in crimson velvet turned up with cloth of gold and tissue and their horses trapped in gold."

In 1533, Anne Boleyn gave birth to a baby girl. Princess Elizabeth was baptised, and Gertrude was chosen as the godmother at the confirmation despite remaining Katherine of Aragon's close friend. It was well known that Gertrude "really wanted to have nothing to do with this" but agreed "so as not to displease the King". By acting as godmother, this forced Gertrude and her husband to show public allegiance to Anne. Also, as a royal baptism was a public spectacle and a godparent was expected to provide an extremely expensive present, historian Eric Ives argued that the decision to appoint Gertrude to this role was malicious.

Mary refused to accept the invalidity of her parents’ marriage and the King's privy council went into an emergency session in 1536 to discuss what should be done. Despite being a member, Gertrude's husband was barred from attending as he and his wife were known to be close to Mary. Chapuys reported to Emperor Charles V of the love that Courtenay had for the princess, “in whose service he would willingly, as he has often sent to tell me, shed his blood.” In 1536, when Catherine of Aragon died and Anne Boleyn suffered a miscarriage, Gertrude passed information to Chapuys that the King was tiring of his wife and wanted to be rid of her.

After Anne Boleyn's fall and beheading, Gertrude's standing was again improved at court. In October 1537, she represented Princess Mary at the pre-funeral ceremonies for Queen Jane Seymour at Hampton Court Palace. She also carried the new born Prince Edward during his christening.

Gertrude was imprisoned with her husband, Henry Courtenay, and their son, Edward, in the Tower of London following the discovery of the supposed Exeter Conspiracy in 1538. Widowed when Henry was executed, Gertrude was attained. She and her son remained in prison for the rest of Henry VIII's reign. The King is said to have partied at Westminster while Courtenay was being beheaded on Tower Hill.

In 1540, Gertrude was released from the Tower. Her attainder was reversed by Mary I of England, and she was appointed as her lady in waiting during her reign. She was close to the Queen and slept in her chambers.

== Death ==
Gertrude died in 1558 and was buried in Wimborne Minster, Dorset.

== Issue ==
Gertrude had two sons with her husband:

- Henry Courtenay, who died in infancy;
- Edward Courtenay, 1st Earl of Devon (c. 1527 – 18 September 1556), eldest surviving son, who having spent 15 years incarcerated in the Tower of London was released on 3 August 1553, a few days after the accession of Queen Mary to the throne. She created him Earl of Devon on 3 September 1553. He had been tutored during his imprisonment by Bishop Stephen Gardiner, who viewed him as a protégé, and he had been considered by many courtiers as a potential husband for Mary before her marriage to Phillip II of Spain.
