= Edward Courtenay, 1st Earl of Devon (1485 creation) =

English nobleman

Arms of Edward Courtenay, 1st Earl of Devon, KG (d.1509), quartering Courtenay and Redvers, with crest of a plume of ostrich feathers.

Edward Courtenay, 1st Earl of Devon, (died 1509) was an English nobleman. He was a member of the ancient Courtenay family.

== Origins ==
Edward Courtenay was the son of Sir Hugh Courtenay (c.1427–6 May 1471) of Boconnoc in Cornwall, son of Sir Hugh Courtenay (aft 1358–5 or 6 March 1425) of Haccombe in Devon, younger brother of Edward de Courtenay, 3rd/11th Earl of Devon (died 1419).

== Career ==
A member of a family that had consistently supported the Lancastrian cause throughout the Wars of the Roses, Courtenay became involved with the opposition to King Richard III in the 1480s, having secret dealings with Margaret Beaufort, the dowager queen Elizabeth Woodville, and the latter's son Thomas Grey, 1st Marquess of Dorset. He acted as a courier between the conspirators in England and Henry Tudor's entourage in France. After the failure of the Buckingham Rebellion in 1483 he fled to Brittany to join Henry there. He later accompanied Henry on his expedition to England and fought for him at the Battle of Bosworth Field in 1485.

Their Lancastrian partisanship had led to the forfeiture of the Courtenay earldom of Devon under Edward IV. On the restoration of Henry VI in 1470, John Courtenay, 15th Earl of Devon had been restored to the earldom, but was attainted by Edward IV on his return to power in 1471 and killed shortly afterwards at the Battle of Tewkesbury.

Edward Courtenay, as the senior surviving descendant of the previous Courtenay earls, and as a reward for his support, was created earl of Devon by the new king Henry VII in 1485.

== Marriage and son ==
He married Elizabeth Courtenay, daughter of Sir Philip Courtenay (born 1445) of Molland, granddaughter of Sir Philip Courtenay (died 1463) of Powderham. Edward and Elizabeth his wife were third cousins once removed, sharing a common descent from Hugh de Courtenay, 2nd/10th Earl of Devon.

They had one son, William Courtenay, 1st Earl of Devon (died 1511), attainted 1504, imprisoned during the reign of Henry VII and released by his son Henry VIII but died before being formally restored to the earldom. His son Henry Courtenay, 1st Marquess of Exeter was restored in blood and honours and created a marquess in 1525, but beheaded in 1539 for conspiring to place Reginald Pole upon the throne.

== Death and burial ==
Courtenay made his will on 27 May 1509 and died in the same month, possibly only hours later. His will was proved at Lambeth on 15 July 1509. He requested to be buried in "the chapel at Tiverton", next to his wife. This refers to the now demolished Courtenay chantry chapel, within St Peter's Church, the parish church of Tiverton, which once contained no doubt many richly decorated Courtenay family monuments. To this chantry, he left lands of the yearly value of £4 for the performance of religious rites.

A fine monument, now lost, was erected in the Tiverton chapel apparently to Edward Courtenay and his wife, but was destroyed before the end of the 16th century. The historian of Devon Tristram Risdon (died 1630) wrote of Tiverton:

"In the church yard is a chapel, built by the Earls of this county, and appropriated for their burials (now demolished) where there is a tomb, under which, Edward Courtenay, Earl of Devonshire, and his countess were interred, having their effigies in alabaster, sometimes sumptuously gilded, and was about forty years ago to be seen, and which, lamenteth me to write, time hath not so much defaced, as men have mangled that magnificent monument, which had this written thereon, as some have seen:

Hoe, hoe, who lyes here?
'Tis I, the goode erle of Devonshire,
With Kate, my wyfe, to mee full dere,
Wee lyved togeather fyfty-fyve yere.
That wee spent wee had;
That wee lefte wee loste;
That wee gave wee have."

W. Hamilton Rogers wrote of a certain Dr. Oliver who in alluding to this epitaph says "that "Kate" is manifestly wrong and Cleveland's reading of "Mabel" is equally incorrect. There can be little doubt of the effigies being intended for Edward Courtenay, second of that name Earl of Devonshire and Elizabeth his wife". Rogers believed the inscription to date from the late 15th century from its similarity to others of known date.

== Succession ==
The Earl's inheritance was disputed and became a celebrated Peerage Case in the 19th century. The analysis in several documents deposited at Westcountry Studies library and the Devon History Centre, Exeter, reveals how the bifurcation of the lineage caused the descendants of the female lines to claim patrimony. This was rejected in favour of the cadet Powderham line, despite this being the junior male inheritance.

Peerage of England
New creation	Earl of Devon; 3rd creation 1485–1509	Extinct
