= Anne of York (daughter of Edward IV) =

English princess (1475–1511)

- Lady Howard
- Born: 2 November 1475; Westminster Palace, London, England
- Died: 23 November 1511 (aged 36)
- Burial: first: Thetford Priory, Norfolk; later: Church of St Michael the Archangel, Framlingham
- Spouse: Thomas Howard (m. 1495)
- Issue: Thomas Howard
- House: York
- Father: Edward IV of England
- Mother: Elizabeth Woodville

Anne of York (2 November 1475 – 23 November 1511) was the fifth daughter of King Edward IV of England and his queen consort Elizabeth Woodville.

Soon after the death of her father and the usurpation of the throne by her uncle Richard III, Anne, who was about eight years old, was declared illegitimate among the other children of Edward IV by Elizabeth Woodville. The princess's mother, fearing for the children's lives, moved them to Westminster Abbey, where the late king's family received asylum and spent about a year. After the king promised not to harm his brother's family, Anne and her older sisters went to the court.

When Richard III was killed, and Henry Tudor took the throne under the name of Henry VII, the act recognising the children of Edward IV as bastards was cancelled. Henry VII married the eldest of Edward IV's daughters, Elizabeth, and Anne became a valuable diplomatic asset. Her marriage to a Scottish prince was planned, but in 1488 the prince's father, King James III, was killed, and marriage negotiations were interrupted and never resumed. In 1495, Anne was married to Thomas Howard, who had claimed marriage to her since the time of Richard III. The union with Howard was not happy and overshadowed by the death of all their children. Anne herself, who had poor health, died at the age of about 36.

== Birth and early years ==
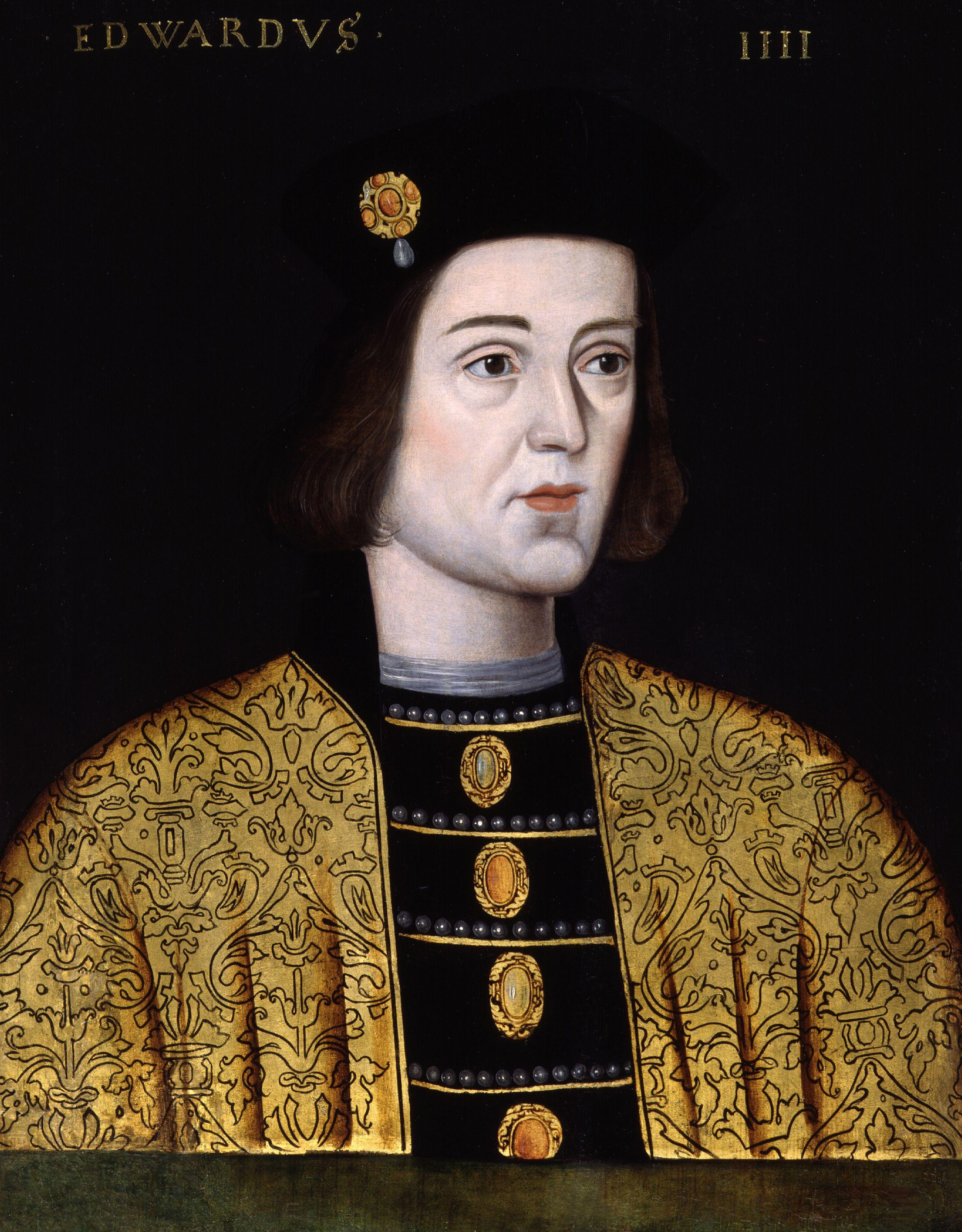
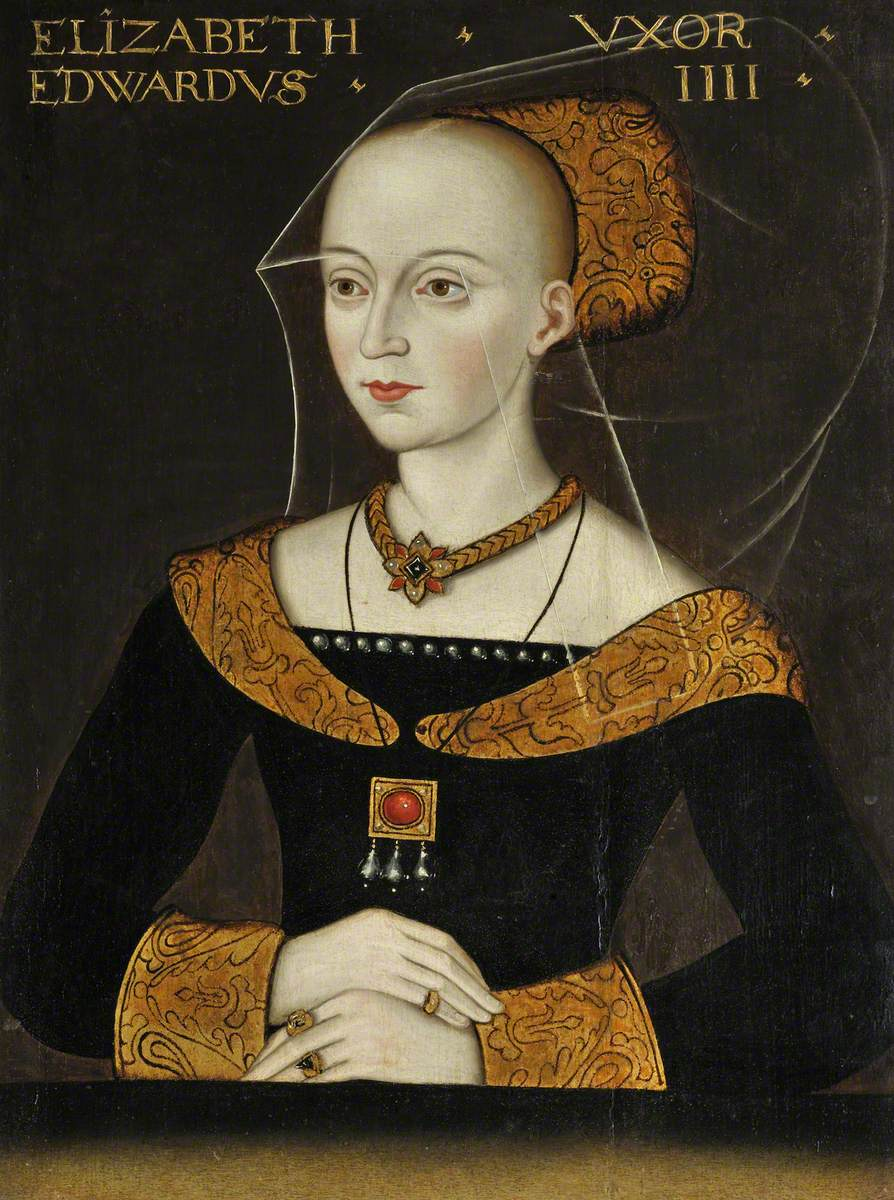
(left) Portrait of Edward IV, now at the National Portrait Gallery, London, c. 1597 – 1618 (right) Portrait of Elizabeth Woodville from the collection of Queens' College, Cambridge, c. 1471

Anne was born on 2 November 1475 at the Palace of Westminster as the fifth daughter and seventh of ten children of King Edward IV of England and Elizabeth Woodville. Anne had six sisters, of whom only four reached adulthood—two eldest (Elizabeth and Cecily) and two younger (Catherine and Bridget); Mary, who was eight years older than Anne, died at the age of 14 from some illness, and Margaret, who was about three years older than Anne, died in infancy. Anne also had five brothers: three full-blooded (the future Edward V, Richard and George) and two half-brothers from her mother's first marriage to John Grey of Groby: Thomas and Richard Grey. Neither of Anne's three full-brothers survive adulthood: George died at about two years of age, while the other two brothers, Edward V and Richard, disappeared from the Tower in 1483 during the reign of their uncle King Richard III.

Anne's paternal grandparents were Richard of York, 3rd Duke of York (who claimed the rights of the House of York to the English throne) and Cecily Neville, and her maternal grandparents were Richard Woodville, 1st Earl Rivers, and Jacquetta of Luxembourg, Dowager Duchess of Bedford. She was baptised at Westminster Abbey shortly after birth, being named both after her paternal aunt Anne of York, Duchess of Exeter and her paternal great-grandmother Anne de Mortimer; the very name "Anne" was relatively new to the English royal family, and Anne became the first daughter of a king with that name. In addition, the choice of the king was probably influenced by the superstitious reverence with which Edward IV was rumored to have held Saint Anne; the king turned to the patronage of the saint at critical moments in his life in the early stages of coming to power, and therefore felt indebted to her.

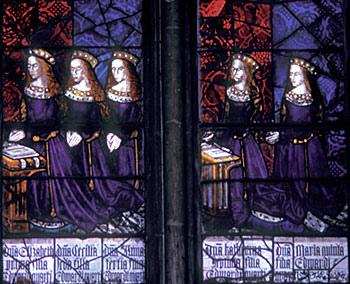
Daughters of King Edward IV. Stained-glass window of the north-west transept of Canterbury Cathedral, 16th century. Anne may be depicted fourth from the left. (Note: The stained-glass window was made by order of Edward IV by the royal master William Neuve after the birth of his sixth (but fifth surviving) daughter Catherine in August 1479, but before November 1480—when his youngest daughter Bridget was born. More recent research has determined the order of the sisters in the stained-glass window as Elizabeth, Cecily, Anne, Catherine and Mary; however, it is more likely that the York princesses are arranged in seniority on the stained-glass window and Anne is depicted fourth from the left.)

In 1479, when Anne was not yet four years old, Edward IV began negotiations on the marriage of his daughter with Philip, son of the archduke Maximilian of Austria. The Austrian Prince at that time was second in line to the throne of the Holy Roman Empire. The initiative of the union came from the Archduke and was enthusiastically received in England, since the marriage was supposed to bring political benefits. Philip's mother, Mary of Burgundy, was the heiress of vast lands and had influence on European affairs; besides, her stepmother was Edward IV's sister Margaret of York, widow of Duke Charles the Bold. The following year, the agreement took on a more formal form: as a financial security for the princess, she was allocated an amount of 100,000 crowns; Archduke Maximilian agreed to pay Anne 6,000 crowns per year from the moment she reaches the age of 12 years—the age of marriage consent, and from the moment she arrived at the court of the future father-in-law and the engagement was ratified, Anne was to receive land in Artois worth 8,000 livres for her use. In the event that Anne refused the marriage, Edward IV or his successor had to pay 60,000 livres. In return, the archduke undertook to provide the English king with military and political support against France. On 5 August 1480, negotiations were completed.

The court records of 1479 report that at the time when negotiations were underway for the marriage of Anne and Philip of Austria, the princess's nurse, "Agnes, wife of Thomas Butler", was dismissed with the appointment of a pension. The records show that Anne, who had not even reached the age of four, was considered old enough to be separated from her nurse. Earlier, at the same time as Anne, Agnes Butler was engaged in raising the princess's younger brother George, who died in March 1479 at the age of about two years.

== Under Richard III ==
The project of Anne's marriage to Philip of Austria remained in force until the death of the princess's father in 1483. The death of Edward IV was followed by a political crisis that dramatically changed the position of the former queen and her children. Anne's older brother, Edward V, who succeeded to the throne, was captured by his uncle Lord Protector Richard, Duke of Gloucester on his way from Wales to the capital; at the same time, Anthony Woodville and Richard Grey, Anne's maternal uncle and half-brother, who accompanied the young king, were arrested. Edward V was moved to the Tower of London to await his coronation, where he was later joined by his only brother, Richard; along with the rest of the children, including Anne, the dowager queen took refuge in Westminster Abbey.

On 22 June 1483 the marriage of Edward IV with Elizabeth Woodville was declared illegal; all the children of the late king were declared illegitimate by the Act of Titulus Regius and were deprived of their rights to the throne and all titles. A few days later, Anthony Woodville and Richard Grey were beheaded. On 6 July, Richard of Gloucester was proclaimed king under the name of Richard III; shortly thereafter Anne's brothers, who remained locked up in the Tower, disappeared. After Richard III took the throne and following his orders, his squire John Nesfield sent guards to Westminster, who, day and night, inspected everyone who entered and left the dowager queen's sanctuary, since there were fears that one of Anne's older sisters would be able to escape abroad and find an ally there for overthrow of Richard III. On Christmas Day 1483, Henry Tudor, whose mother was in a plot with Elizabeth Woodville against Richard III, swore in Rennes Cathedral that he would marry Anne's older sister Elizabeth or the next one Cecily (if the marriage to Elizabeth for any reason will be impossible) after taking the English throne. But the uprising of the Tudor party, led by the Duke of Buckingham, failed even before Henry's oath in Rennes.

After the failure of Buckingham's rebellion, Richard III began negotiations with his brother's widow. On 1 March 1484, the king publicly swore that the daughters of Edward IV would not be harmed or molested; in addition, Richard III promised that they would not be imprisoned in the Tower or any other prison, that they would be placed "in respectable places of good name and reputation", and later be married to "men of noble birth" and given dowry lands with an annual income of 200 marks each. On the same day, the memorandum was delivered to the dowager queen, along with provisions. The princesses with great joy agreed to leave their gloomy abode and go under the care of their "gracious uncle", who allocated them chambers in his palace. Tudor historian Edward Hall wrote that Richard III "made all the daughters of his brother solemnly arrive at his palace; as if with new familiar and loving entertainment they were supposed to forget...the trauma inflicted on them and the tyranny that preceded this".

Soon after the daughters of Edward IV arrived at court, the king began to look for suitable suitors for his nieces. For Anne, he chose Thomas Howard, the son and heir of the 1st Earl of Surrey and second-in-line to the Dukedom of Norfolk, to show his favor to the Howard family. The betrothal was signed in 1484, but the king didn't have time to formalise the marriage.

== Under Henry VII and Henry VIII ==
In August 1485, Richard III died at the Battle of Bosworth, and Henry Tudor became the new king by right of conquest under the name of Henry VII, who had previously sworn to marry Anne's older sister. Upon ascending the throne, Henry VII repealed the Titulus Regius act, which deprived the children of Edward IV of titles and rights to the throne; the act itself and all its copies were removed from the archives, as well as all the documents associated with them.

When Elizabeth of York married the new king, Anne was only twelve years old, and she, along with her other sisters, were at court under the tutelage of the queen, their eldest sister and only patroness. The princess began to participate in court ceremonies. She attended the christening of her first nephew, Arthur, Prince of Wales on 24 September 1486; Anne carried the baptismal veil, which, after the ceremony, covered the head of the prince, and she herself was accompanied on the right hand by the knight-constable Richard Guildford and on the left the by knight-marshal John Turbeville. Anne performed the same role at the christening of her eldest niece Margaret in 1489. The princess took part in the Easter celebrations, Pentecost and Christmas, as well as other events at the court of Henry VII.

Shortly after his accession to the throne, Henry VII began to make matrimonial plans for his wife's relatives and seek an alliance with Scotland. The king planned to marry his mother-in-law Elizabeth Woodville to the widowed King James III, and his heir James, Duke of Rothesay was to marry one of the daughters of the late king. Since Cecily, the former betrothed of James, was already engaged to the king's uncle John Welles, and Catherine was to become the wife of the prince's younger brother, it was necessary to choose between Anne and the youngest of her sisters, Bridget. Bridget planned to enter a monastery, and thus Anne remained the only candidate, but with the death of James III in 1488, all negotiations were terminated and never resumed.

In 1488, on St George's Day, Anne, among twenty other ladies, was present in the retinue of her sister the queen; she was dressed in a robe of scarlet velvet and sat on a snow-white palfrey, whose saddle was draped in a golden cloth embroidered with white roses, the symbol of the House of York. The next time the princess is mentioned in the sources in connection with the death of her mother in June 1492: Anne sat at the bedside of the dying woman in Bermondsey Abbey, where the dowager queen spent the last five years of her life. Anne led the mourners at her mother's funeral instead of Queen Elizabeth, who was expecting the birth of her fourth child and therefore delegated her powers and responsibilities to her younger sister. Anne and her younger sisters, Catherine and Bridget, departed with the Queen's body by river to Windsor Castle, where on 13 June Elizabeth Woodville was buried next to her second husband Edward IV in St George's Chapel. According to the herald's notes, "the standard-bearers walked ahead of milady Anne, who was present at the memorial mass instead of the queen; she prayed on her knees on the carpet and pillow. She was accompanied by Viscount Welles...and Dame Catherine Grey carried the train of Lady Anne...".

=== Marriage ===
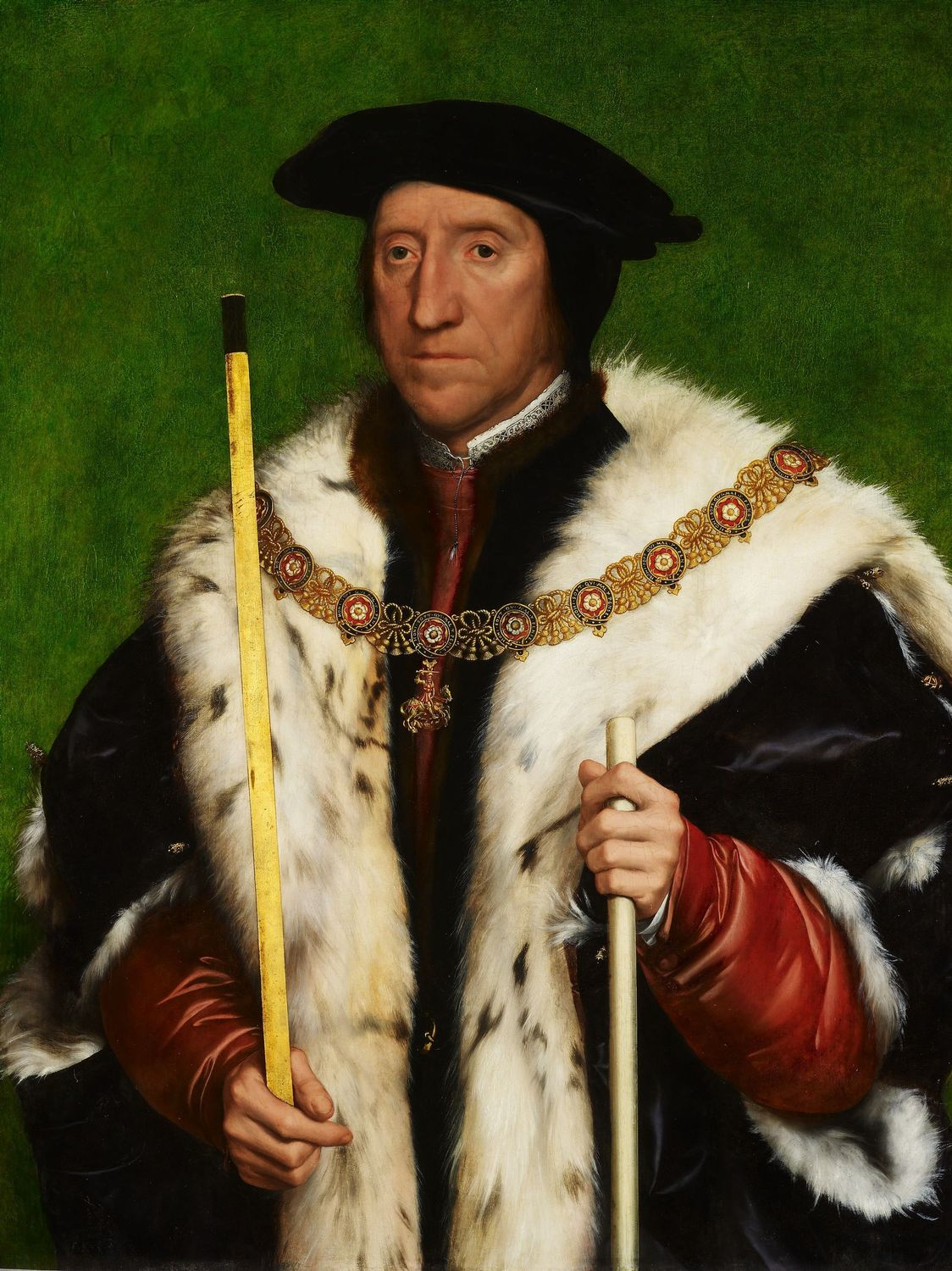
Thomas Howard, later 3rd Duke of Norfolk, by Hans Holbein the Younger, c. 1539

When Anne reached the marriageable age, Queen Elizabeth began to look for her a suitable groom. The queen turned her attention to representatives of the English nobility and, first of all, to Thomas Howard, the son and heir of the 1st Earl of Surrey, to whom Richard III had already planned to marry Anne. The princess was personally acquainted with her future husband since childhood, since his father served at court in the private chambers of Edward IV. In the Wars of the Roses, the Howard family sided with Richard III, which is why under Henry VII, in 1485 the Earl of Surrey was imprisoned in the Tower for three and a half years, deprived of his rights, titles and possessions. Later, he received freedom, restoration of rights and most of the lands and was called to the court, where he received a position close to the king. At the same time, not all titles were returned: Thomas' father received back the title of Earl of Surrey but the title and honours of Duke of Norfolk, which he was supposed to inherit after the death of his father at Bosworth, were granted to him only in 1514. Thomas was older than Anne by about two years.

The queen took into account the opinion of her sister and considered that the Howard family were noble enough to qualify for a high marriage, and therefore on 4 February 1495 (according to other sources in 1494) the wedding of Anne and Thomas Howard was celebrated. The wedding took place in Westminster Abbey, and the marriage celebrations took place in the Palace of Placentia. The royal couple attended the wedding, and the king also attended a festive mass, but the dowry of 10,000 marks, assigned to Anne by her father, wasn't received by the newlyweds. By order of the queen, the couple were assigned annuity payments in the amount of £120 per year, which were to be carried out throughout Anne's life or until the death of her mother-in-law: this amount included the maintenance of Anne herself, as well as her servants and seven horses. This pension was appointed, among other things, because the queen did not want to leave Anne dependent on her husband, who, due to circumstances, could not provide the princess with a comfortable existence. Since the groom's father received only part of the family estate and in this part there was no residence suitable for a woman of royal blood, the newlyweds received the right to use the estates located in the possessions of the Duke of York and the Marquess of Dorset, Anne's nephew and half-brother, respectively. In return, the queen demanded that in the event of the death of the Earl of Surrey or his wife, a wealthy heiress, Anne's interests should be taken into account on an equal basis with the interests of her husband. The king allocated for Anne another £26 per year from the crown lands.

After the wedding, Anne left the court and visited her sister very rarely. One of the reasons for this could be her poor health—both physical and mental. Little is known about the life of the princess during this period. Queen Elizabeth's court documents report that in 1502–1503 she paid for seven yards of green silk from Bruges for Anne's dress, costing 2 shillings 8 pences a yard. In addition, in 1502, the queen added 10 marks (6 pounds 13 shillings 4 pences) to her sister's annual pocket expenses, as well as £120 to Thomas Howard, which he had to spend on his wife's food. In 1503, the queen died and the attitude towards Anne at the court changed. She attended the funeral of Queen Elizabeth, but not as a mourner, but as a simple spectator; Anne's grief at the loss of her sister was so great that she could not attend the entire funeral ceremony.

Anne's marriage to Thomas Howard was not a happy one. Thomas had a relationship with Anne's lady-in-waiting Bess Holland, and all of their children predeceased them. The exact number and names of children born to Anne are unknown. Mary Anne Everett Green writes that the records of the Howard house indicate four children, of which only one child, a son named Thomas, lived long enough to be christened. Alison Weir dates Thomas's birth to about 1496 and death to 1508; Everett Green writes that the exact date of death is indicated on the boy's grave: 4 August 1508. James Panton reports that in addition to Thomas, Anne had two sons who died in infancy and a stillborn child, but Weir among the four children of Anne, in addition to Thomas, mentioned a son and two daughters—all three died before it became possible to christen them. Anne's son was buried at Lambeth in the Howard family crypt, where his grandfather's remains were later transferred.

=== Later life and legacy ===
Only two records of the last years of Anne's life have survived. On 23 March 1510, her nephew King Henry VIII granted his aunt and her spouse a property with a garden in Stephenheath; on 22 November the king (in compensation for the lands claimed in right of her great-grandmother Anne de Mortimer, wife of Richard of Conisburgh, 3rd Earl of Cambridge) gave Anne and her possible heirs extensive possessions, including the Castle and Manor of Wingfield and many other properties in Norfolk, Suffolk, York, Lincoln and Oxford.

The exact date of Anne's death is unknown. Alison Weir writes that the princess died after 22 or 23 November 1511, but before 1513; James Panton gives 23 November 1511 as an approximate date. Mary Ann Everett Green writes that Anne is no longer mentioned in the act of transferring some property to the Howard family, considered in Parliament in February 1512; in addition, the possibility of Thomas Howard's marriage to Lady Elizabeth Stafford was discussed at the same time. All this indicates that by February 1512, Anne was undoubtedly dead.

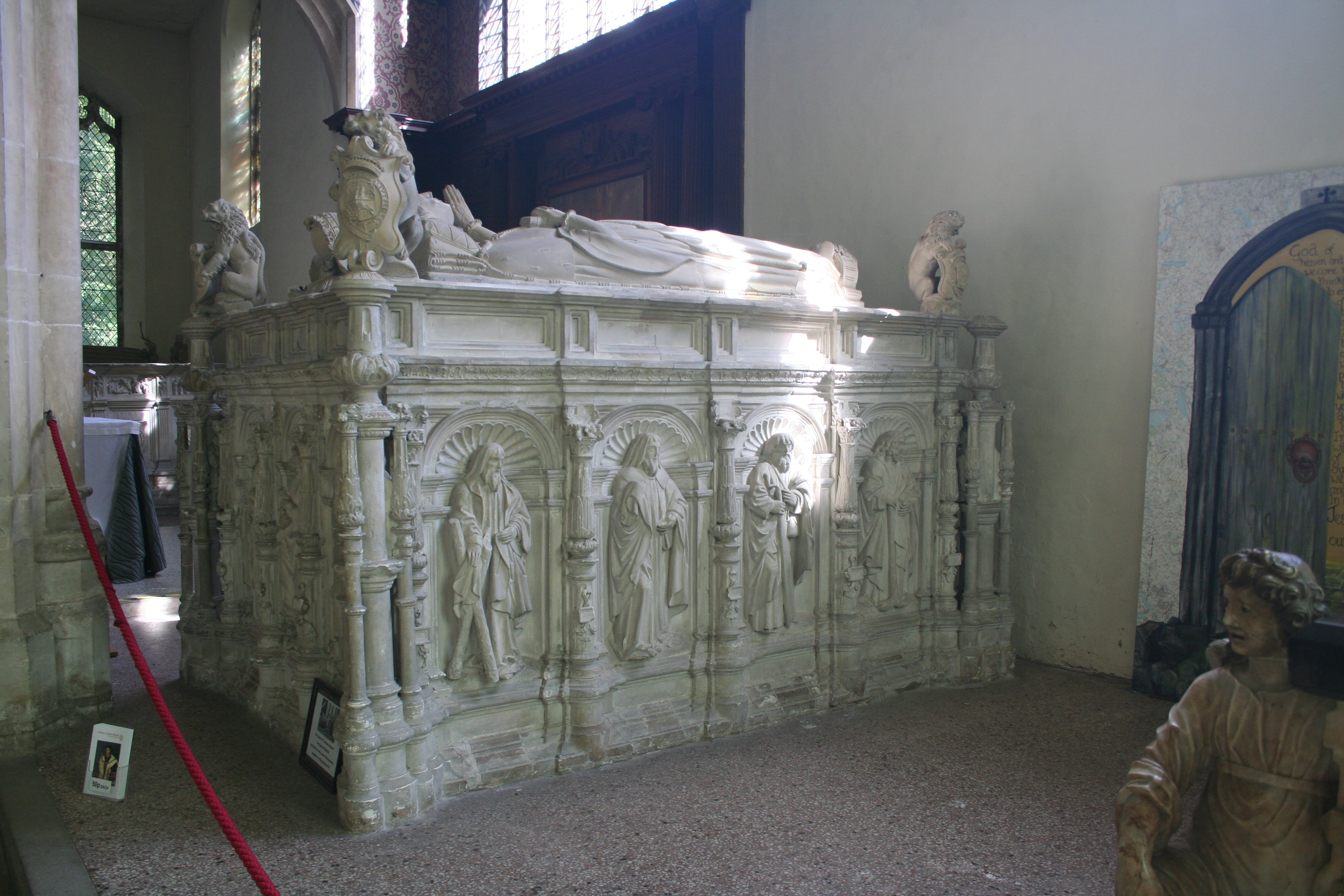
Tomb of Anne of York and her husband, Thomas Howard in the Church of St Michael the Archangel, Framlingham

The princess was originally buried at Thetford Priory. After the Reformation, Anne's widower petitioned the king to keep the Priory and turn it into a parish church, since not only Anne, the king's aunt, but also Henry VIII's illegitimate son Henry FitzRoy was buried here. The petition had no effect. The same request was made to the king by other nobles, and he refused them all; at the same time, Henry VIII allowed the dissolution of the monasteries to be suspended, so that everyone who wished had time to rebury the remains of relatives. Thomas Howard moved Anne's remains to the Church of St Michael the Archangel, Framlingham and ordered a rich tombstone, with the expectation that after death he would rest there, which happened in 1554. Since Anne was of royal lineage, Thomas Howard was buried to her left instead of to her right as was customary.
