= Bridget of York =

English princess and nun (1480–1507)

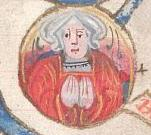
- Born: 10 November 1480; Eltham Palace, London, England
- Died: bef. December 1507 (aged 26 or 27); Dartford Priory, Kent, England
- House: York
- Father: Edward IV of England
- Mother: Elizabeth Woodville

Bridget of York (10 November 1480 – before December 1507) was the seventh daughter of King Edward IV and his queen consort Elizabeth Woodville.

Shortly after the death of her father and the usurpation of the throne by Richard III, Bridget, who was not even three years old, was declared illegitimate among the other children of Edward IV by Elizabeth Woodville. The girl's mother, fearing for the lives of the children, moved them to Westminster Abbey, where the family of the late king received asylum and spent about a year. After the king's promise not to harm his brother's family, the elder sisters of the princess went to the court; Bridget, along with another sister Catherine, presumably stayed with her mother.

When Richard III died, and Henry Tudor took on the throne under the name of Henry VII, the act recognizing the children of Edward IV as bastards was canceled. Henry VII married Bridget's eldest sister, Elizabeth. Bridget was considered as a possible bride of a Scottish prince, but in the end it was decided to send the princess to a nunnery, to which she herself was inclined. Bridget settled at Dartford Priory in Kent, leaving only once to attend her mother's funeral. After becoming a nun, she kept in touch with her sister the queen, who paid for her petty expenses. Bridget died and was buried in Dartford Priory, which was turned into a royal residence after the English Reformation.

== Life ==
=== Birth ===
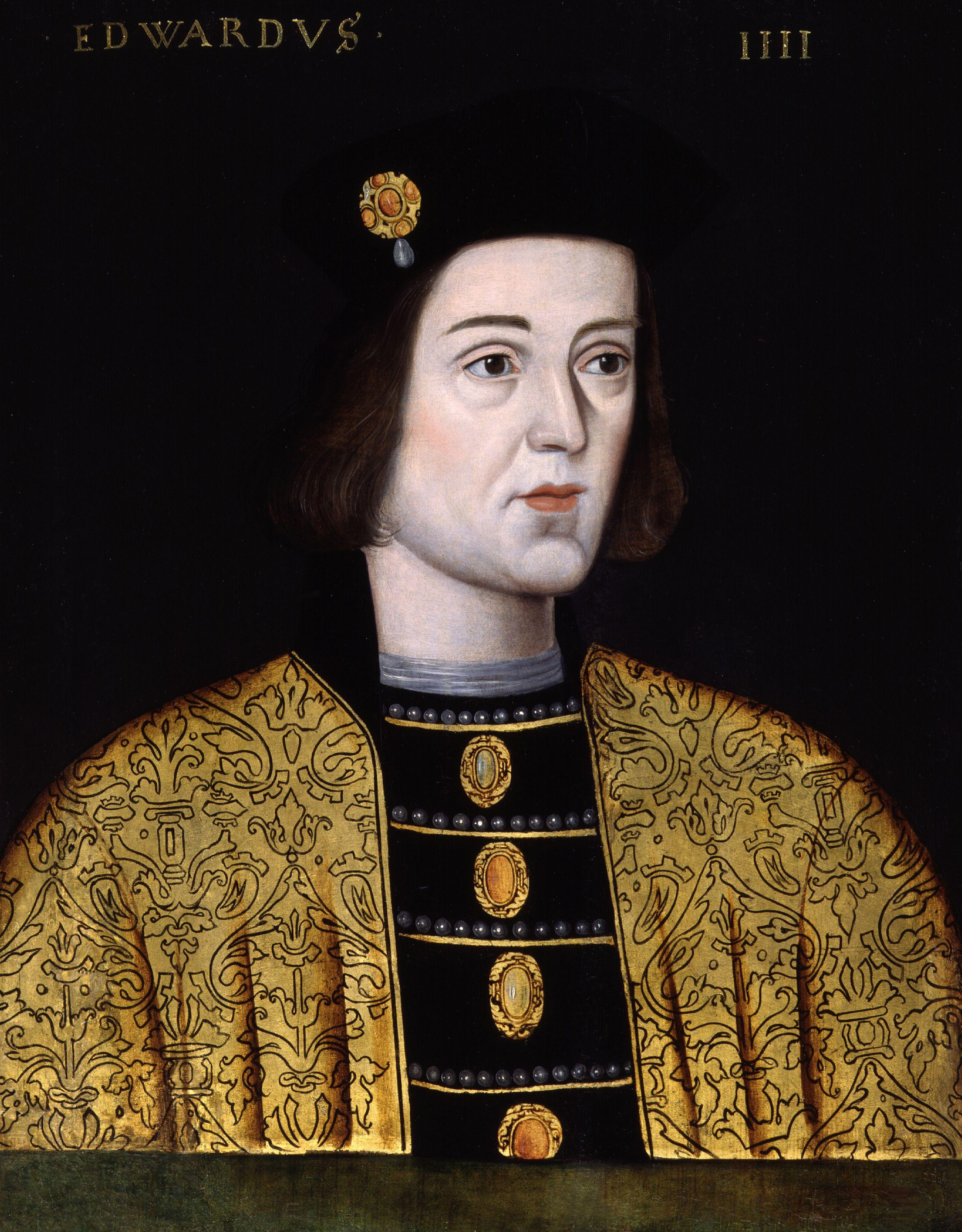
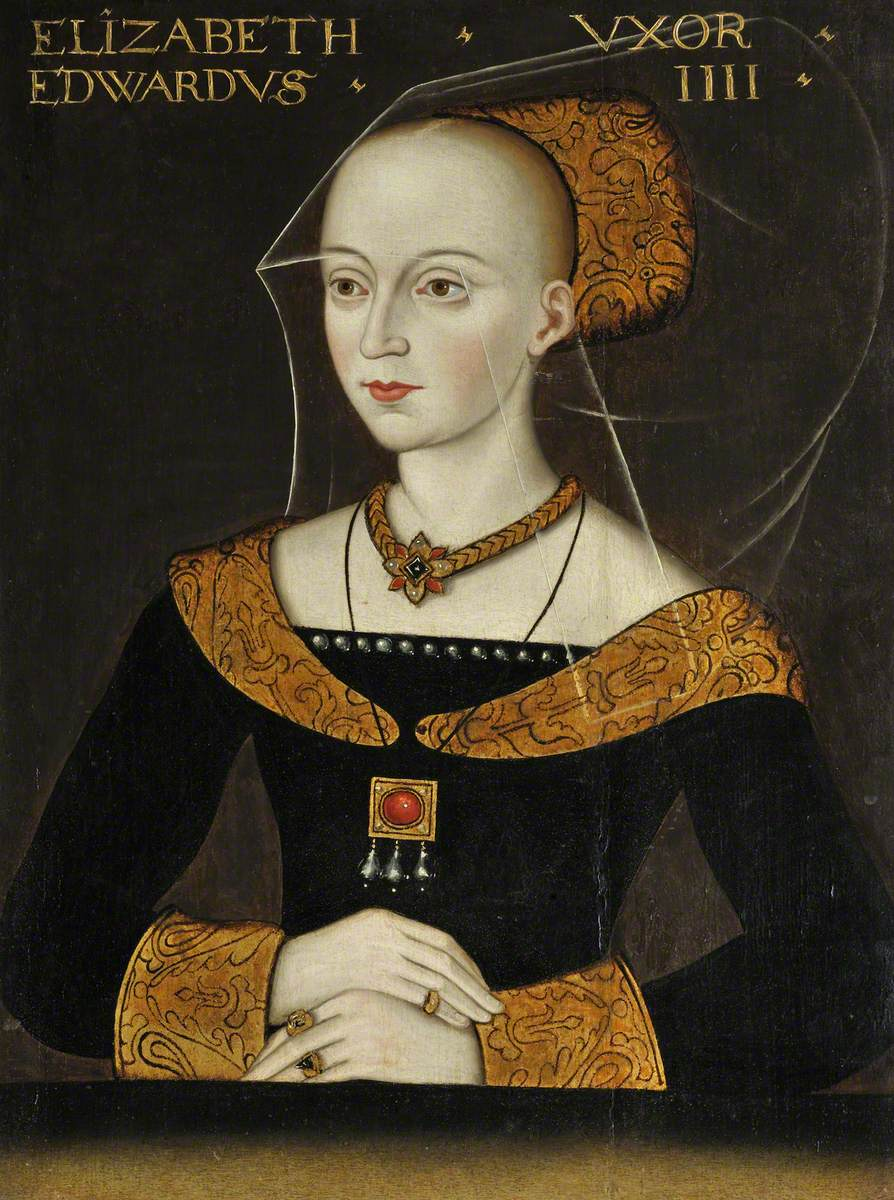
(left) Portrait of Edward IV, now at the National Portrait Gallery, London, c. 1597–1618 (right) Portrait of Elizabeth Woodville from the collection of Queens' College, Cambridge

Bridget was born on 10 November 1480 at Eltham Palace as the seventh daughter and youngest of ten children of King Edward IV of England and Elizabeth Woodville. Bridget had six older sisters, of whom only four reached adulthood (Elizabeth, Cecily, Anne, and Catherine); Mary died at the age of 14 from an illness in 1482, and Margaret died in infancy in 1472, nearly eight years before Bridget was born. She also had five brothers: three full-blooded elders and two half-blooded elders from her mother's first marriage to John Grey of Groby: Thomas and Richard Grey. Bridget's youngest full brother, George, died at about two years of age, while the other two brothers, Edward V and Richard, disappeared from the Tower in 1483 during the reign of their uncle Richard III. Bridget's paternal grandparents were Richard of York, 3rd Duke of York (who claimed the rights of the House of York to the English throne) and Cecily Neville, and her maternal grandparents were Richard Woodville, 1st Earl Rivers, and Jacquetta of Luxembourg, Dowager Duchess of Bedford.

Bridget was born on St. Martin's Eve and was baptized the next day by Edward Story, Bishop of Chichester. Her godmothers at the baptismal font were her paternal grandmother, Cecily Neville, Duchess of York, and her oldest sister, Elizabeth of York; her godfather was the aged William Waynflete, Bishop of Winchester. At the christening ceremony, the newborn princess was carried by Lady Margaret Beaufort, the wife of Lord Stanley, the steward of Edward IV's household. When the princess was confirmed (which immediately followed the baptism), her maternal aunt, Margaret Woodville, Lady Maltravers, acted as her godmother. The princess was named presumably in honor of St. Bridget of Sweden. The name was unusual for the English royal family, and the princess became the first bearer of it; it is likely that the name Bridget was chosen by her paternal grandmother Cecily Neville, who was interested in the Order of the Bridgettines, of which St. Bridget of Sweden was the founder.

=== Childhood ===
On 9 April 1483, when Bridget was two years old, Edward IV died suddenly. This was followed by a political crisis that dramatically changed the position of the former queen and her children. Bridget's older brother, Edward V, who succeeded to the throne, was captured by his uncle Lord Protector Richard, Duke of Gloucester on his way from Wales to the capital; at the same time, Anthony Woodville and Richard Grey (Bridget's uncle and half-brother, respectively) who accompanied the young king, were arrested. The king was moved to the Tower of London, where he was later joined by his only full-brother, Richard; during the night of 29–30 April, Elizabeth Woodville, with all her daughters (as well as much treasure and other possessions) fled to Westminster Abbey, where she asked for sanctuary, (Note: The Sanctuary was a legally defined and protected area of relative safety within the boundary walls of the Abbey. It included both houses and shops.) for fear of the Duke of Gloucester. There are conflicting reports as to whether Bridget was at the sanctuary with her mother: Mary Anne Everett Green writes that there were accounts that indicated the princess was in poor health, (Note: In the spring, or just possibly the summer, of 1483 Bridget was reportedly ill, lying 'sick...in the Wardrobe', that is, in the storehouse and occasional royal residence just north of Baynard's Castle and the church of St Andrew-by-the-Wardrobe in the city of London.) and thus she could have been left with one of the Queen Dowager's confidants; however, most of the medical bills came from the brief reign of her brother Edward V before the late king's family moved to Westminster Abbey, and was also recorded that for much of 1483 and the early months of 1484, Bridget was with her mother and older sisters in semi-confinement within the sanctuary.

On 22 June 1483 the marriage of Edward IV with Elizabeth Woodville was declared illegal. All the children of the late king were declared illegitimate by the act of parliament Titulus Regius and deprived of the right to the throne and all titles. A few days later, Bridget's previously captured uncle and half-brother, Anthony Woodville and Richard Grey, were executed. On 6 July 1483, Richard of Gloucester was proclaimed king under the name of Richard III, shortly thereafter there was no news of Bridget's brothers locked up in the Tower. On Christmas Day 1483, Henry Tudor, whose mother had been plotting with Elizabeth Woodville against Richard III, took an oath at Rennes Cathedral, that he marries Bridget's older sister, Elizabeth, or the next in seniority Cecily (if marriage with Elizabeth for some reason is impossible) after she takes the English throne. But the uprising of the Tudor party, led by the Duke of Buckingham, failed even before this oath.

After the execution of Buckingham, Richard III decided to negotiate with his brother's widow. On 1 March 1484, the king swore publicly that the daughters of his late brother would not be harmed or molested; in addition, the king promised that they would not be imprisoned in the Tower or any other prison, that they would be placed "in respectable places of good name and reputation", and later be married to "men of noble birth" and given dowry lands with an annual income of 200 marks each. On the same day, the memorandum was delivered to the Queen Dowager, along with provisions. The princesses with great joy agreed to leave their gloomy abode and go under the care of their "gracious uncle", who allocated them chambers in his palace. Tudor historian Edward Hall wrote that Richard III: "made all the daughters of his brother solemnly arrive at his palace; as if with him new – familiar and loving entertainment – they were supposed to forget...the trauma inflicted on them and the tyranny that preceded this". According to the generally accepted version, Bridget and her sisters were transported to the royal palace under the protection of Richard III, but there is a version according to which Bridget and her older sister Catherine remained with their mother after leaving the sanctuary. At the same time, Bridget herself enjoyed her stay in the abbey.

Two years later, in August 1485, Richard III died at the Battle of Bosworth, and Henry Tudor became the new king by right of conquest. This monarch repealed the act of Titulus Regius, which deprived the children of Edward IV of titles and rights to the throne; the act itself and all its copies were removed from the archives, as well as all the documents associated with them. Bridget's eldest sister Elizabeth, in accordance with the oath of Rennes, became Queen consort of England.

=== Nunnery ===
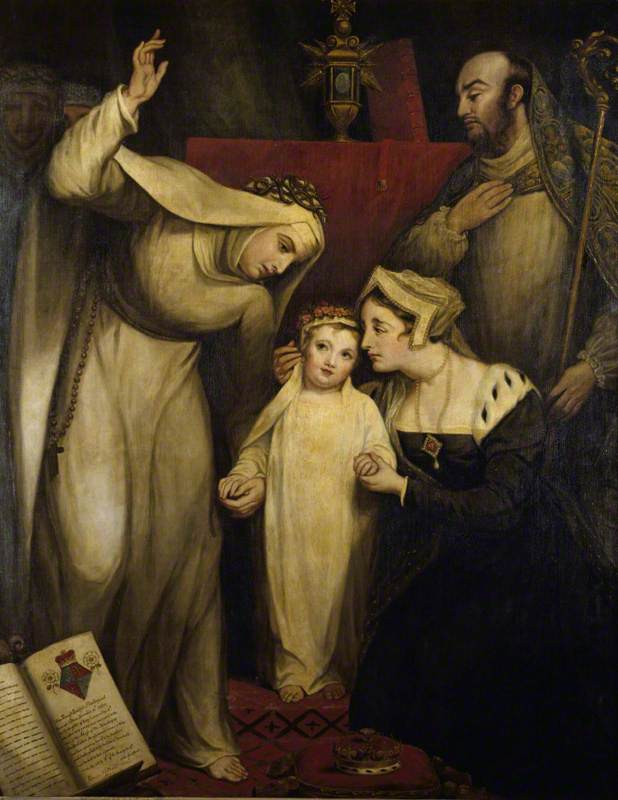
Dedication of Bridget to the nunnery at Dartford, as imagined by James Northcote (1822). National Trust, Petworth House, West Sussex.

Probably, immediately after the birth of Bridget, her parents began to consider sending their daughter to a convent, where she would devote herself to a religious life. Richard III planned to marry off his niece to one of his supporters as soon as she reached the age of consent. Later, Henry VII began to make matrimonial plans for his wife's relatives, and initially Bridget (although not mentioned by name) was considered as one of the two possible brides of James, Duke of Rothesay, and heir to the Scottish throne, the alternative option being her elder sister Anne, similarly unnamed. When Bridget expressed her strong desire to become a nun, Anne was chosen as the bride of the Duke of Rothesay. Along with her other unmarried sisters, she was briefly considered in 1489 as a bride for Gian Galeazzo Sforza, Duke of Milan: although in respect of Bridget, at least, that initiative quickly fizzled out.

The exact date of the departure of the princess to Dartford Priory in Kent is unknown, but it happened already around 1489, when is known that Bridget was under the care of Elizabeth Cressener, prioress in Dartford, but before 1492, when Bridget's mother died. In her desire to enter a monastery, Bridget was supported by the mother of Henry VII, Lady Margaret Beaufort, known for her religiosity, which probably influenced the final decision of the king. In 1492, the princess, who was not yet twelve years old, briefly left the monastery to attend her mother's funeral: Bridget, among other mourners, accompanied her mother's body by water to Windsor, where she attended Mass, after which she returned to Dartford Priory.

Dartford Priory as the monastic life of the princess was not chosen by chance. The monastery was founded by Edward III and developed under his grandson Richard II, and for some time was used by members of the nobility from all over England for both teaching and religious life. The monastery several times passed from one monastic order to another –Dominicans and Augustinians; during Bridget' stay in the monastery Dartford belonged to the Augustinian Order. The nuns were dedicated to a contemplative life, meaning that they spent their time in prayer and spiritual recreation, such as devotional reading; indeed, when in 1495 Cecily Neville, Duchess of York (Bridget's grandmother and godmother) made her will, she left three books to the princess: two were lives of holy women, St Catherine of Siena and Hilda of Whitby, and the third was a popular compendium of saints lives, the Legenda Aurea or Golden Legend, undoubtedly in the form of a translation.

The monastery was closed, and with the exception of the funerals of her mother and sister, there is no evidence that Bridget ever left Dartford Priory. Modern records of Bridget about her are extremely short and few. Thomas More wrote: "Bridget represented the same virtue as the one whose name she bore, professing and observing the canons of religious life in Dartford". Throughout her life, Bridget maintained a regular correspondence with her sister, the queen, who paid for her sister's petty expenses and maintenance in the amount of 20 marks.Agnes of Eltham, an orphan and ward at Dartford Priory, was allegedly Bridget's illegitimate daughter, and for this reason was financially supported by the queen until her death in 1507. From time to time, Bridget received additional payments from her sister the queen, although undisputed evidence of these survives only for the last year of the queen's life: for example, on 6 July 1502, the queen sent by messenger to the prioress of Dartford £3 6s 8d a quarter (that is, a total of twenty marks per year) to cover Bridget's expenses and the same amount to herself; it seems likely, however, that this was an arrangement of long standing. The last payment from the queen to Bridget was made a few months before Elizabeth's death in 1503. On 24 September 1502, Bridget received a letter from her sister from Windsor, in which the queen inquired about her sister's health and asked her to pray for her.

=== Death and burial ===
Bridget died and was buried in Dartford Priory; the cause of her death is unknown. The exact date of the princess' death is also unknown: according to various sources, this happened before 1513 (Note: Mary Anne Everett Green proposed that Bridget died in or before 1513, and based this statement on her reading of Thomas More's History of King Richard III (written, according to William Rastell, about 1513), were the author mentioned that Catherine was the only surviving child of Edward IV at that time.) or approximately in 1517. (Note: This year date is derived from an unsourced statement made by the antiquarian John Weever in his Ancient Funerall Monuments, published in 1631.) However, recent research proved that neither date is correct: Bridget was already dead by December 1507, when her brother-in-law King Henry VII paid for a stone to cover her grave.

Bridget was laid to rest in the choir of the priory church. The tombstone, a ledger stone laid on the floor of the choir, was probably destroyed or reused in 1541, when Dartford Priory, during the English Reformation, was largely demolished and remodelled as a royal manor house for her nephew King Henry VIII, although the residence wasn't used for the next ten years.
