= Queen of England (disambiguation) =

Queen of England was a title for the English monarch.

Queen of England or English Queen may also refer to:

== Royalty ==
- A female English monarch
  - Mary I (1516–1558; r. 1553–1558)
  - Elizabeth I (1533–1603; r. 1558–1603)
  - Mary II (1662–1694; r. 1689–1694)
  - Anne (1665–1714; r. 1702–1714), Queen of England until 1707 and subsequently Queen of Great Britain, which included England
- A female English royal consort (i.e. spouse of an English monarch)
- A technically erroneous reference to a female British monarch
  - Victoria (1819–1901; r. 1837–1901), Queen of the United Kingdom, which includes England
  - Elizabeth II (1926–2022; r. 1952–2022), Queen of the United Kingdom, which includes England
- A technically erroneous reference to a female British royal consort (i.e. spouse of a British monarch)

== Other uses ==
- Queen of England, a British barque that was shipwrecked on 3 September 1865
- "Queen of England", a 2002 song by Roger Glover & The Guilty Party from the album Snapshot
- "The Queen of England", a 2018 episode of the American TV series Santa Clarita Diet

== See also ==
- Elizabeth of England (disambiguation)
- Mary of England (disambiguation)
- Queen Anne of England (disambiguation)
- Queen of Ireland (disambiguation)
- Scottish queen (disambiguation)
