= Langstroth =

Langstroth may refer to:

- Agnes Langstroth (1498–1530), alleged granddaughter of Edward IV
- L. L. Langstroth (1810–1895), U.S. clergyman and beekeeper, after whom is named:
  - Langstroth Cottage, a historic building in Oxford, Ohio
  - Langstroth hive, a design of beehive
- Dawn Langstroth (born 1979), Canadian singer–songwriter

== See also ==
- Langstrothdale, a valley in the Yorkshire Dales in North Yorkshire, England
