= Margaret of York (disambiguation) =

Margaret of York may refer to:

- Margaret of York (1446–1503), Duchess of Burgundy, daughter of Richard Plantagenet, 3rd Duke of York
- Margaret of York (1472), niece of the Duchess of Burgundy
- St. Margaret Clitherow (1556–1586), English saint of the Roman Catholic Church
- Princess Margaret, Countess of Snowdon (1930–2002), sister of Queen Elizabeth II
