= Mary of Scotland =

Mary of Scotland may refer to:

== People ==
- Mary, Queen of Scots (1542–1587), Queen regnant of Scotland from 1542 to 1567
- Mary II of England (1662–1694), Queen regnant of Scotland, England and Ireland from 1689 until her death
- Mary of Scotland, Countess of Boulogne (1082–1116), daughter of Malcolm III of Scotland (Máel Coluim III) and Saint Margaret of Scotland; wife of Eustace III of Boulogne
- Mary of Scotland (c. 1380–c. 1458), daughter of Robert III of Scotland and Annabella Drummond
- Mary Stewart, Countess of Buchan (?–1465), daughter of James I of Scotland and Joan Beaufort; wife of Jan van Borselen, Lord of Campvere
- Mary of Guelders (1434–1463), Queen consort to James II of Scotland, and the regent of Scotland 1460–1463
- Mary Stewart, Countess of Arran (1453–1488), daughter of James II of Scotland and Mary of Guelders; married Thomas Boyd, 1st Earl of Arran and James Hamilton
- Mary of Guise (1515–1560), Queen consort to James V of Scotland and mother of Mary, Queen of Scots; regent of Scotland 1544–1560
- Henrietta Maria of France (1609–1669), Queen consort of Scotland, England and Ireland, also known as Queen Mary
- Mary of Modena (1658–1718), Queen consort of Scotland, England and Ireland

== Other uses ==
- Mary of Scotland (play), 1933 Broadway play by Maxwell Anderson
- Mary of Scotland (film), a 1936 film about Mary, Queen of Scots, based on the Maxwell Anderson stage play of the same name

== See also ==
- Mary of England (disambiguation)
- Mary, Queen of Scots (disambiguation)
- Mary Tudor (disambiguation)
