= Mary of England =

Mary of England may refer to:

- Mary I (1516–1558), Queen of England from 1553 until her death
- Mary II (1662–1694), Queen of England from 1689 until her death

== See also ==
- Henrietta Maria of France (1609–1669), queen consort of England, also known as Queen Mary
- Mary of Modena (1685–1688), queen consort of England
- Mary of Scotland (disambiguation)
- Mary of Teck (1867–1953), queen consort of the United Kingdom and the British Dominions
- Mary of Waltham (1344–1362), daughter of Edward III of England
- Mary of Woodstock (1279–1332), daughter of Edward I of England
- Mary of York (1467–1482), daughter of Edward IV of England
- Mary Stuart (1605–1607), daughter of James VI and I, King of England
- Mary Tudor (disambiguation)
- Mary, Princess Royal and Princess of Orange (1631–1660), daughter of Charles I of England
- Princess Mary (disambiguation)
- Queen Mary (disambiguation)
