= Agnes of Eltham =

- Born: 1498; England
- Died: 1530 (aged 31–32)

Agnes of Eltham (1498–1530) was an English woman rumored to have been the illegitimate daughter of Princess Bridget of York. Bridget of York was a nun and the daughter of Edward IV and Elizabeth Woodville.

== Early life ==
Agnes of Eltham was said to be an orphan and ward of the Dartford Priory in Dartford, Kent where her mother, Bridget of York, lived in seclusion. Agnes's expenses were covered by the crown until Elizabeth of York, Bridget's sister, died in 1503. Bridget of York died of unknown causes in 1507, at the age of 27.

== Marriage ==
Agnes left the Priory in 1514 and married Adam Langstroth (1490–1549). Langstroth was the head of a landed family in Yorkshire (the ancestral home of the Yorks and refuge of York loyalists in the early Tudor period) with 'a considerable dowry'. Adam Langstroth fought beside Lord Clifford during the Battle of Flodden Field in 1513. Longstrother Dale in Yorkshire's West Riding had been home to Longstroth's family for many generations. His wife, and mother of his sons, was called Agnes, but there is no evidence that she was called 'Agnes of Eltham'. Langstroth's wife had at least one son, Christopher Langstroth.

== Dartford Priory ==
A Dominican house located sixteen miles outside of London in Kent, known to be Dartfort Priory, is described by Paul Lee, author of Nunneries, Learning and Spirituality in Late Medieval English Society: the Dominican Priory of Dartford, as one of the ten wealthiest and largest nunneries in England. Agnes was alleged to be an orphan and ward of the Dartford Priory in Dartford, Kent. Agnes would have called the Priory home at a time when the Priory was also the home of Princess Bridget of York, the younger sister to Elizabeth, queen consort to Henry VII and daughter of Edward IV of England and Elizabeth Woodville. Henry VII and Elizabeth of York patronized Agnes by providing for her financial needs until her death in 1507. Bridget was said to have entered Dartford in 1490, an event that was associated with her mother's withdrawal into Bermondsey Abbey, but in fact Woodville had gone to Bermondsey in 1487. Elizabeth Cressner, the prioress of the nunnery from 1489 to 1536, was in charge of the Priory throughout Bridget's tenure at Dartford. As the only Dominican nunnery in England, the nunnery followed the Rule of St. Augustine, which, according to Paul Lee, detailed a life of strict poverty, chastity, communal charity and obedience. Lee also notes that "[e]nclosure of the nuns was strict, in principle, and there is no hint of scandal involving nuns leaving the monastic confines". Nonetheless, the priory did accommodate secular boarders, and both boys and girls received an education there.

== Agnes Roper ==
It is possible that 'Agnes of Eltham' was mistaken for Agnes Roper, the only known nun with her name in Dartford in the years leading up to the Dissolution. Her father was John Roper of Well Hall, the Attorney General, and her brother, William Roper, married Margaret, the daughter of Sir Thomas More. Well Hall is at Eltham, which could account for her being called Agnes of Eltham. Priory records contain no mention of a child of Bridget. Instead the record states: "Sister Agnes Roper, daughter of Henry VIII's attorney general John Roper of Eltham... was a nun at Dartford from the 1520s until the time of Dissolution."
