= Mary, Queen of Scots (disambiguation) =

Mary, Queen of Scots (1542–1587; r. 1542–1567) was the queen regnant of Scotland.

Mary, Queen of Scots may also refer to:

== People ==
- Mary II (1662–1694), Queen of England and Scotland r. 1689–1694
- Mary of Guelders (1433–1463), queen consort of King James II of Scotland and queen regent during the minority of James III of Scotland
- Mary of Guise (1515–1560), queen consort of King James V of Scotland and queen regent during the minority of Mary, Queen of Scots
- Mary of Modena (1658–1718), queen consort of King James VII of Scotland (King James II of England)
- Mary of Teck (1867–1953), queen consort of King George V of the United Kingdom, whose primary realm included Scotland

== Arts and entertainment ==
=== Films ===
- Mary, Queen of Scots (1971 film), a British historical drama
- Mary Queen of Scots (2013 film), a Swiss period drama
- Mary Queen of Scots (2018 film), an American–British historical drama

=== Literature ===
- Mary Queen of Scots, a book by Mary Russell Mitford, 1831
- Mary Queen of Scots (1969 book), by Antonia Fraser

=== Music ===
- Mary, Queen of Scots (opera), by Thea Musgrave, 1977
- Mary Queen of Scots (album), by Eugenius, 1994

== See also ==
- Cultural depictions of Mary, Queen of Scots
- Maria Stuart (disambiguation)
- Mary I (disambiguation)
- Mary of Scotland (disambiguation)
- Mary, Queen of Scots and the Murder of Lord Darnley, a book by Alison Weir, 2003
- Mary Queen of Scots House, Jedburgh, Scotland, United Kingdom
- Mary Queen of Shops, a BBC television programme, 2007
- Mary, Queen of Tots, an American short film, 1925
- Mary Stuart (disambiguation)
- Queen Mary (disambiguation)
- Queen of Scots: The True Life of Mary Stuart, a book by John Guy, 2005
- Scottish queen (disambiguation)
