= Maria Stuart =

Maria Stuart may refer to:

- Mary, Queen of Scots
- Maria Stuart (biography), a biography of Mary, Queen of Scots
- Maria/Stuart, a play by Jason Grote
- Mary Stuart (Schiller play), a verse play by Friedrich Schiller

== See also ==
- Maria W. Stewart (1803–1879), American abolitionist and lecturer
- Mary, Queen of Scots (disambiguation)
- Mary Stuart (disambiguation)
