= Elizabeth Cressener =

English prioress

- Born: c. 1457; East Anglia
- Died: 1536 or 1537; Dartford
- Occupation: Dominican nun
- Known for: Prior of Dartford Priory
- Predecessor: Alice
- Successor: Joan Vane

Elizabeth Cressener (c. 1457 – 1536 or 1537) was an English prioress of the Dominican Dartford Priory in Kent. One of her nuns was a Princess, daughter of Edward IV. She lived to see the start of the Dissolution of the Monasteries.

== Life ==
Cressener was born in East Anglia in the late 1450s. She had an aristocratic background being related to Edward IV. Her family appears to have been keen on the Dominican order as judged from graves at Sudbury in Suffolk where there was a Dominican Friary.

Dartford Priory had been founded in 1356. The King paid £20 for the expense of bringing four nuns from France to start the priory. It enjoyed Royal Patronage until the dissolution of the monasteries.

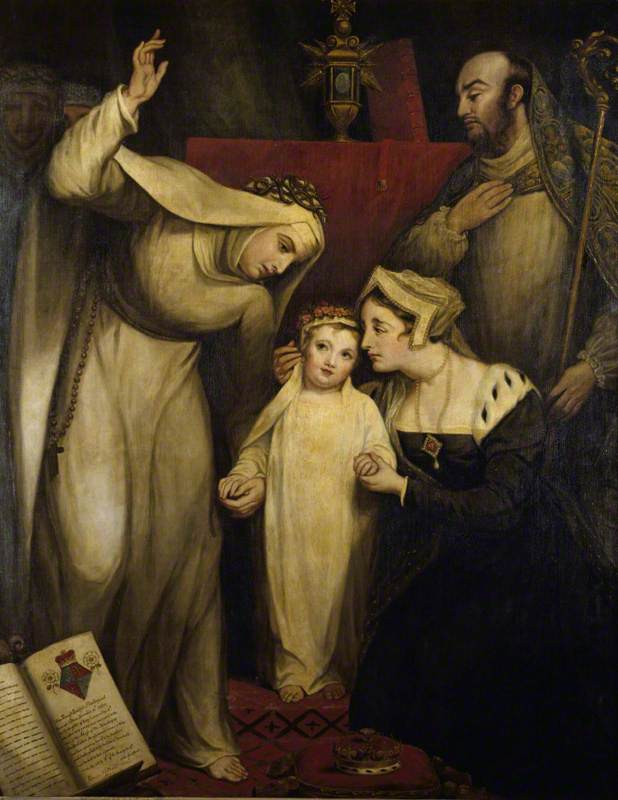
Dedication of Bridget to the nunnery at Dartford, as imagined by James Northcote in 1822

Cressener became the Prioress succeeding a nun named Alice in 1489. Cressener as the prioress of Dartford, controlled the Priory's extensive portfolio of properties. In Kent the priory owned woods and other land as well as houses, inns, mills and chalk quarries. In addition they owned property and controlled church advowsons in Bedfordshire, Buckinghamshire, Dorset, Glamorgan, Herefordshire, Hertfordshire, London, Norfolk, Suffolk, Surrey and Wiltshire.

In her second year, Bridget of York, the King's youngest daughter, joined Dartford Priory. She was only ten, but in time she would be a princess who became one of Cressener's nuns. Bridget was dead by December 1507, when her brother-in-law King Henry VII paid for a stone to cover her grave.

Priories contained nuns, novices and people to look after their spiritual needs. Sometimes secular women were allowed into priories but this was disallowed from 1503. Exceptionally in 1520, Cressener was permitted to let any women into the priory whether they were secular or religious. They all had to be upper-class but they could wear habits or ordinary clothes. Widows were acceptable as well as the usual young ladies who would be trained in the priory.

In 1536 the Dissolution of the Monasteries started and initially houses would be closed if they had an income under £200 a year or they were full of 'manifest sin, vicious, carnal, and abominable living' as alleged by the act empowering their closure. The commissioners closed over 300 monasteries but 80 were spared despite their small size – but this was only in the first wave of closures.

Under the terms of the Dissolution the Prioresses could be pensioned after their convent was closed but the nuns would be homeless. Dissolution allowed these nuns to move to other convents. Cressener was concerned that she might receive these nuns and she wrote to Thomas Cromwell to object. She pointed out to him that they were the only Dominican community of nuns in England and therefore any nuns who entered their house would be unfamiliar with their way of working.

== Death and legacy ==
Cressener died in Dartford in about 1536 or 1537. The priory was closed in 1539 as part of the Dissolution of the Monasteries. In 1822 the occasion of the entry of Bridget of York into her priory was imagined in a painting by James Northcote. "Elizabeth Cressener" was chosen in a list of Prioresses' names that were approved for street names in Dartford and there is a Cressener Place.
