= Elizabeth Woodville =

Queen of England (1464–1470; 1471–1483)

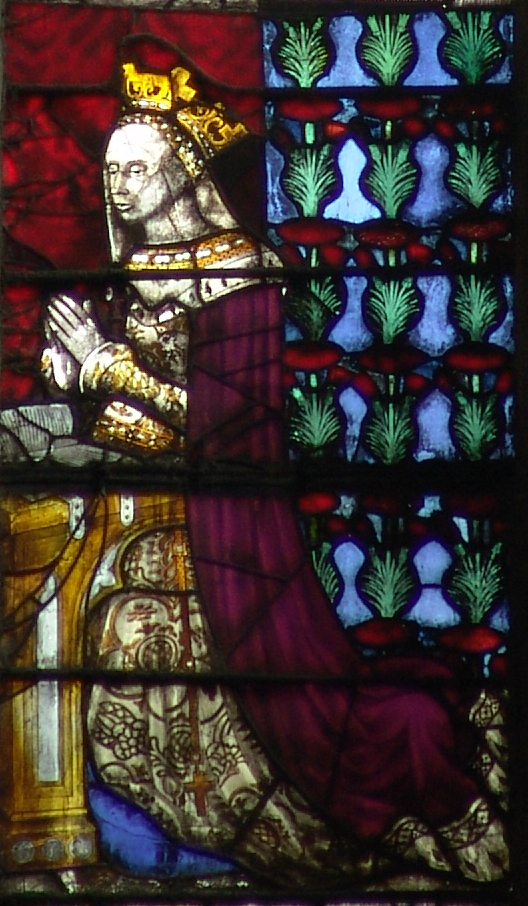
- Stained glass depiction, 15th century

Queen consort of England
- Tenures: 29 September 1464 – 3 October 1470; 11 April 1471 – 9 April 1483
- Coronation: 26 May 1465
- Born: c. October 1437; Grafton Regis, Northamptonshire, England
- Died: 8 June 1492 (aged 54–55); Bermondsey Abbey, Surrey, England
- Burial: 12 June 1492; St George's Chapel, Windsor Castle, Berkshire, England
- Spouses: Sir John Grey (m. c. 1452; died 1461); Edward IV of England (m. 1464; died 1483)
- Issue more...: Thomas Grey, 1st Marquess of Dorset; Richard Grey; Elizabeth, Queen of England; Mary of York; Cecily, Viscountess Welles; Edward V of England; Margaret of York; Richard, Duke of York; Anne, Lady Howard; George, Duke of Bedford; Catherine, Countess of Devon; Bridget of York
- Father: Richard Woodville, 1st Earl Rivers
- Mother: Jacquetta of Luxembourg

Elizabeth Woodville (also spelt Wydville, Wydeville, or Widvile; (Note: Although the spelling of the family name is usually modernised to "Woodville", it was spelt "Wydeville" in contemporary publications by Caxton, but her tomb at St. George's Chapel, Windsor Castle is inscribed thus: "Edward IV and his Queen Elizabeth Widvile".) c. 1437 – 8 June 1492), known as Dame Elizabeth Grey during her first marriage, was Queen of England from 29 September 1464 (Note: Edward IV married Elizabeth around 1 May 1464, but marriage was kept in secret for several months. Elizabeth was presented as the Queen on 29 September.) until 3 October 1470 and from 11 April 1471 until 9 April 1483 as the wife of King Edward IV. She was a key figure in the Wars of the Roses, a dynastic civil war between the Lancastrian and the Yorkist factions between 1455 and 1487.

At the time of her birth, Elizabeth's family was of middle rank in the English social hierarchy. Her mother, Jacquetta of Luxembourg, had previously been an aunt-by-marriage to King Henry VI, and was the daughter of Peter I, Count of Saint-Pol. Elizabeth's first marriage was to a minor supporter of the House of Lancaster, John Grey of Groby. He died at the Second Battle of St Albans in 1461, leaving Elizabeth a widowed mother of two young sons.

Elizabeth's second marriage, in 1464, to Edward IV became a cause célèbre. Elizabeth was known for her beauty but came from minor nobility with no great estates, and the marriage took place in secret. Edward was the first king of England since the Norman Conquest to marry one of his subjects, and Elizabeth was the first such consort to be crowned queen. (Note: John's marriage to Isabel of Gloucester was annulled shortly after his accession, and she was never crowned; Henry IV's first wife Mary de Bohun died before he became king.) The couple had ten children together. The marriage greatly enriched Elizabeth's siblings and children, but their advancement incurred the hostility of Richard Neville, Earl of Warwick, "The Kingmaker", and his various alliances with the most senior figures in the increasingly divided royal family. This hostility turned into open discord between King Edward and Warwick, leading to a battle of wills that finally resulted in Warwick's switching allegiance to the Lancastrian cause, and to the execution of Elizabeth's father, Richard Woodville, 1st Earl Rivers, and her brother, John, by Warwick in 1469.

After the death of her husband in 1483, Elizabeth remained politically influential even after her son, briefly proclaimed King Edward V, was deposed by her brother-in-law, Richard III. Edward and his younger brother Richard both disappeared soon afterwards. The Tudor court and Sir Thomas More accused Richard of their murders, although no direct evidence exists tying him to the crime. Elizabeth subsequently played an important role in securing the accession of Henry VII in 1485.

Henry married Elizabeth's eldest daughter, Elizabeth of York, which ended the Wars of the Roses and established the Tudor dynasty. Through her daughter, Elizabeth Woodville was the maternal grandmother of the future Henry VIII, and an ancestor to every English and British monarch that followed. She was forced to yield pre-eminence to Henry VII's mother, Lady Margaret Beaufort; her influence on events in these years, and her eventual departure from court into retirement, remain obscure.

== Early life and first marriage ==
Elizabeth Woodville was born in about 1437 (no record of her birth survives), at Grafton Regis, Northamptonshire. She was the firstborn child of a socially unequal marriage between Richard Woodville and Jacquetta of Luxembourg, which briefly scandalised the English court. The Woodvilles, though an old and respectable family, were gentry rather than noble, a landed and wealthy family that had previously produced commissioners of the peace, sheriffs, and MPs, rather than peers of the realm. Elizabeth's mother, in contrast, was the eldest daughter of Peter I of Luxembourg, Count of Saint-Pol, Conversano and Brienne, and as the widow of John of Lancaster, Duke of Bedford, uncle of King Henry VI of England, was before her second marriage one of the highest ranking women in England. As Jacquetta had pledged, upon the death of her first husband, that she would not remarry without first obtaining royal permission, and as royal permission to marry Woodville was out of the question, the pair married secretly. When the marriage became public knowledge, the couple was heavily fined, but was pardoned on 24 October 1437: it has been conjectured that the pardon coincided with the birth of Elizabeth, the couple's firstborn child.

Around 1452, Elizabeth Woodville married John Grey of Groby, the heir to the Barony Ferrers of Groby. He was killed at the Second Battle of St Albans in 1461, fighting for the Lancastrian cause. This would become a source of irony, since Elizabeth's future husband Edward IV was the Yorkist claimant to the throne. Elizabeth Woodville's two sons from this first marriage were Thomas Grey (later Marquess of Dorset) and Richard Grey.

Elizabeth Woodville was called "the most beautiful woman in the Island of Britain" with "heavy-lidded eyes like those of a dragon".

== Queen consort ==
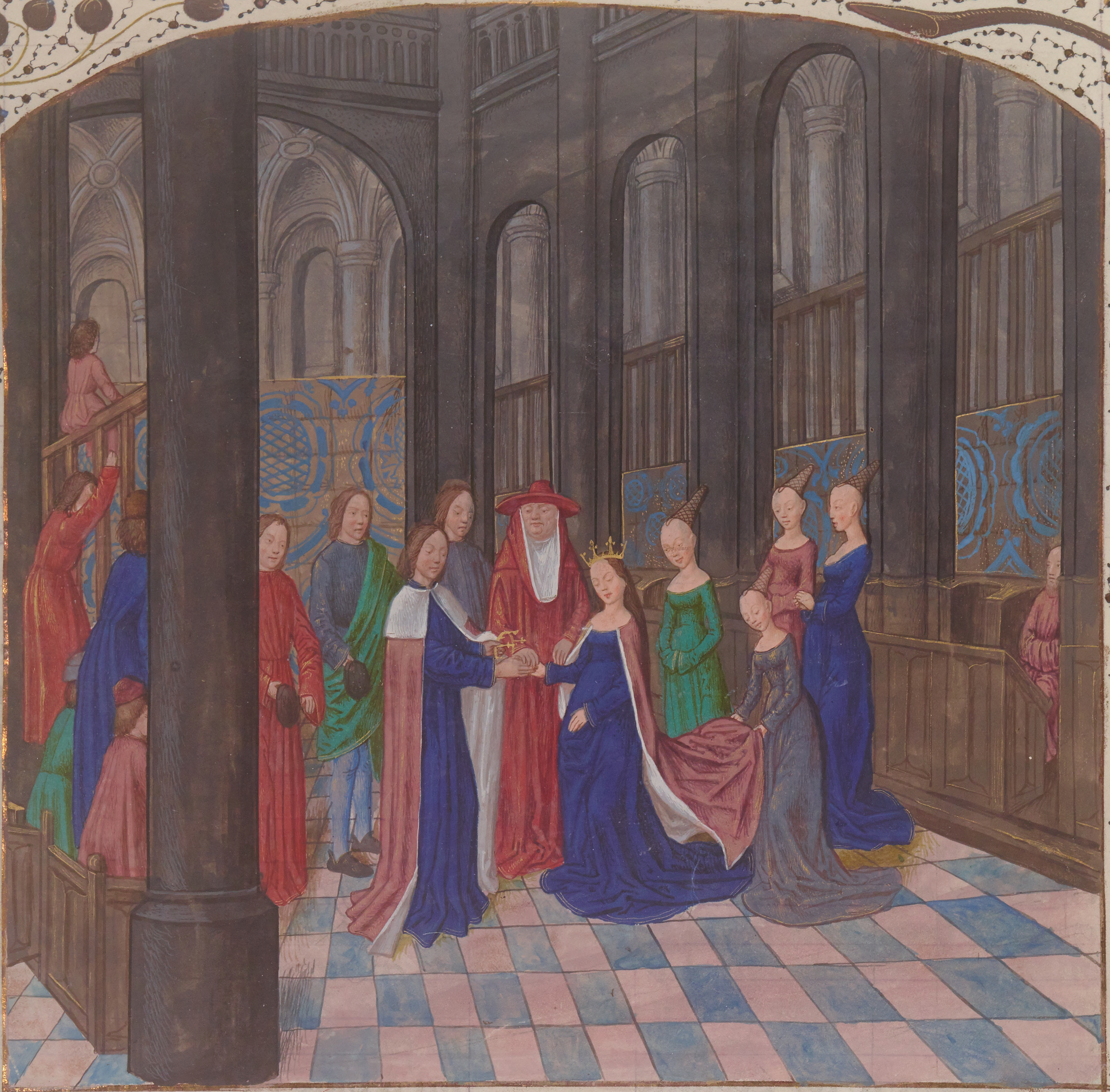
Illuminated miniature depicting the marriage of Edward IV and Elizabeth Woodville, Anciennes Chroniques d'Angleterre by Jean de Wavrin, 15th century

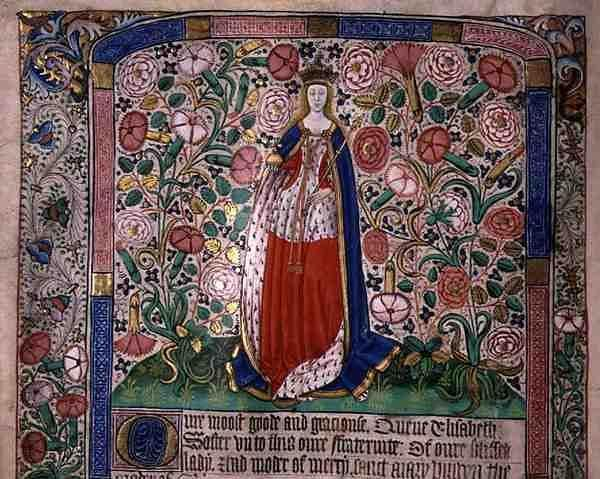
Elizabeth at the time of her coronation surrounded by pink and white roses, symbolic of her union with Edward IV.

Edward IV had many mistresses, the best known of them being Jane Shore, and he did not have a reputation for fidelity. His marriage to the widowed Elizabeth Woodville took place secretly and, though there is no documentary evidence of the date, it is traditionally said to have taken place at her family home in Northamptonshire on 1 May 1464. Only the bride's mother and two ladies were in attendance. Edward married her just over three years after he had assumed the English throne in the wake of his overwhelming victory over the Lancastrians, at the Battle of Towton, which resulted in the displacement of King Henry VI. Edward introduced Elizabeth Woodville as his queen to the royal court at Reading Abbey on Michaelmas Day (29 September 1464).

Elizabeth Woodville came to London for her coronation. Her Royal Entry was marked by a pageant at London Bridge featured angels wearing wigs dyed with saffron and the texts of six ballads were painted and set up on the bridge. She was crowned queen at Westminster Abbey on 26 May 1465, a few days after Ascension Day.

In the early years of his reign, Edward IV's governance of England was dependent upon a small circle of supporters, most notably his cousin, Richard Neville, 16th Earl of Warwick. At around the time of Edward IV's secret marriage, Warwick was negotiating an alliance with France in an effort to thwart a similar arrangement being made by his sworn enemy Margaret of Anjou, wife of the deposed Henry VI. The plan was that Edward IV should marry a French princess. When his marriage to Elizabeth, who was both a commoner and from a family of Lancastrian supporters, became public Warwick was both embarrassed and offended. His relationship with Edward IV was ruined. The match was also badly received by the privy council, who according to Jean de Waurin told Edward with great frankness that "he must know that she was no wife for a prince such as himself".

With the arrival on the scene of the new queen came many relatives, some of whom married into the most notable families in England. Three of her sisters married the sons of the earls of Kent, Essex and Pembroke. Another sister, Catherine Woodville, married the queen's 11-year-old ward Henry Stafford, 2nd Duke of Buckingham, who later joined Edward IV's brother Richard, Duke of Gloucester, in opposition to the Woodvilles after the death of Edward IV. Elizabeth's 20-year-old brother John married Katherine, Duchess of Norfolk, Edward IV and Warwick's aunt. The Duchess had been widowed three times and was in her sixties, so the marriage created a scandal at court. Elizabeth's son, Thomas Grey, married firstly Anne Holland, a niece of Edward, and later Cecily Bonville, 7th Baroness Harington.

Elizabeth's status as a commoner before her sudden, secret marriage to Edward was primarily the reason for the backlash against her queenship. She was often seen as arrogant and disrespectful for actions that would be seen as normal by a lady of higher rank, such as her predecessor Margaret of Anjou. Such was Elizabeth's unpopularity that George, Duke of Clarence, rebellious brother of her husband, later even accused her of witchcraft in order to murder his wife Isabel Neville. Most historians now believe that Isabel died of either consumption or childbed fever.

When Elizabeth Woodville's relatives, especially her brother Anthony Woodville, 2nd Earl Rivers, began to challenge Warwick's pre-eminence in English political society, Warwick conspired with his son-in-law George, Duke of Clarence, the king's younger brother. One of his followers accused Elizabeth Woodville's mother, Jacquetta of Luxembourg, of practising witchcraft. She was acquitted the following year.

Warwick and Clarence twice rose in revolt and then fled to France. Warwick formed an uneasy alliance with the Lancastrian Queen Margaret of Anjou, executed Elizabeth's father and brother after the Yorkist defeat at the Battle of Edgcote, and restored Margaret's husband Henry VI to the throne in 1470. But the following year, Edward IV returned from exile and defeated Warwick at the Battle of Barnet, and the Lancastrians at the Battle of Tewkesbury. Henry VI was killed soon afterwards.

Following her husband's temporary fall from power, Elizabeth Woodville sought sanctuary in Westminster Abbey, where she gave birth to a son, Edward (later King Edward V of England). Her marriage to Edward IV produced a total of ten children, including another son, Richard, Duke of York, who would later join his brother as one of the Princes in the Tower. Five daughters also lived to adulthood.

Elizabeth Woodville engaged in acts of Christian piety in keeping with conventional expectations of a medieval queen consort. She also became a patroness of Queens' College, Cambridge. Her acts included making pilgrimages, obtaining a papal indulgence for those who knelt and said the Angelus three times per day, and founding the chapel of St. Erasmus in Westminster Abbey.

== Queen dowager ==
Following Edward IV's sudden death in April 1483, possibly from pneumonia or being worn out from "high living", Elizabeth became queen dowager. Her young son, Edward V, became king, with his uncle, Richard, Duke of Gloucester, acting as Lord Protector. In response to the Woodvilles' attempt to monopolise power, Gloucester quickly moved to take control of the young king and had the king's uncle Earl Rivers and half-brother Richard Grey, son to Elizabeth, arrested. The young king was transferred to the Tower of London to await the coronation. With her younger son and daughters, Elizabeth again sought sanctuary. Lord Hastings, the late king's leading supporter in London, initially endorsed Gloucester's actions, but Gloucester then accused him of conspiring with Elizabeth Woodville against him. Hastings was summarily executed. Whether any such conspiracy really occurred is not known. Richard accused Elizabeth of plotting to "murder and utterly destroy" him.

On 25 June 1483, Gloucester had Elizabeth Woodville's son Richard Grey and brother Anthony, Earl Rivers, executed in Pontefract Castle, Yorkshire. The Titulus Regius – an act of parliament – declared that Edward IV's children with Elizabeth were illegitimate on the grounds that Edward IV had a precontract with the widow Lady Eleanor Butler, which was considered a legally binding contract that rendered any other marriage contract invalid. One source, the Burgundian chronicler Philippe de Commines, says that Robert Stillington, Bishop of Bath and Wells, carried out an engagement ceremony between Edward IV and Lady Eleanor. The act also contained charges of witchcraft against Elizabeth, but gave no details and the charges had no further repercussions. As a consequence, the Duke of Gloucester and Lord Protector was offered the throne and became King Richard III. Edward V, who was no longer king, and his brother Richard of Shrewsbury, Duke of York, remained in the Tower of London. There are no recorded sightings of them after the summer of 1483.

Letters Patent to the late Queen Annulled Act 1483
- Act of Parliament
- Parliament of England
- Long title: An Acte for adnullinge letters patentes made to Elizabeth late Wyfe of Sir Jo. Grey.
- Citation: 1 Ric. 3. c. 15
- Territorial extent: England and Wales; Ireland

Dates
- Royal assent: 20 February 1484
- Commencement: 23 January 1484 (Note: Start of session.)
- Repealed: 30 July 1948
Other legislation
| Repealed by | Statute Law Revision Act 1948 |

Status: Repealed

Text of statute as originally enacted

Additionally, Elizabeth was stripped of all her entitlements as queen dowager and her lands reverted to the Crown by the Letters Patent to the late Queen Annulled Act 1483. She was granted most, but not all, of these lands back in March 1486 by Henry VII.

== Life under Richard III ==
Now referred to as Dame Elizabeth Grey, she and Henry Stafford, Duke of Buckingham (a former close ally of Richard III and now probably seeking the throne for himself) allied themselves with Margaret Stanley (née Beaufort) and espoused the cause of Margaret's son Henry Tudor, a great-great-great-grandson of King Edward III, the closest male heir of the Lancastrian claim to the throne with any degree of validity. (Note: Henry Tudor's claim to the throne was weak, owing to a declaration of Henry IV that barred the accession to the throne of any heirs of the legitimised offspring of his father John of Gaunt by his third wife Katherine Swynford. The original act legitimising the children of John of Gaunt and Katherine Swynford passed by Parliament and the bull issued by the Pope in the matter legitimised them fully, making questionable the legality of Henry IV's declaration.) To strengthen his claim and unite the two feuding noble houses, Elizabeth Woodville and Margaret Beaufort agreed that the latter's son should marry the former's eldest daughter, Elizabeth of York, who upon the death of her brothers became the heiress of the House of York. Henry Tudor agreed to this plan and in December 1483 publicly swore an oath to that effect in the cathedral in Rennes, Brittany. A month earlier, an uprising in his favour, led by Buckingham, had been crushed.

Richard III's first Parliament of January 1484 stripped Elizabeth of all the lands given to her during Edward IV's reign. On 1 March 1484, Elizabeth and her daughters came out of sanctuary after Richard III publicly swore an oath that her daughters would not be harmed or molested and that they would not be imprisoned in the Tower of London or in any other prison. He also promised to provide them with marriage portions and to marry them to "gentlemen born". Richard also awarded Elizabeth a pension of 700 Marks per year. The family returned to Court, apparently reconciled to Richard III. After the death of Richard III's wife Anne Neville, in March 1485, rumours arose that the newly widowed king was going to marry his niece Elizabeth of York. It is known that Richard was in negotiation to marry Joana of Portugal and to marry off Elizabeth to Manuel, Duke of Beja.

== Life under Henry VII ==
In 1485, Henry Tudor invaded England and defeated Richard III at the Battle of Bosworth Field. As king, Henry VII married Elizabeth of York and had the Titulus Regius revoked and all found copies destroyed. Elizabeth Woodville was accorded the title and honours of a queen dowager.

Scholars differ about why Dowager Queen Elizabeth spent the last five years of her life living at Bermondsey Abbey, to which she retired on 12 February 1487. Among her modern biographers, David Baldwin believes that Henry VII forced her retreat from the court, while Arlene Okerlund presents evidence from July 1486 that she was already planning her retirement from court to live a religious, contemplative life at Bermondsey Abbey. Another suggestion is that her retreat to Bermondsey was forced on her because she was in some way involved in the 1487 Yorkist rebellion of Lambert Simnel, or at least was seen as a potential ally of the rebels.

At Bermondsey Abbey, Elizabeth was treated with the respect due to a dowager queen. She lived on a pension of £400 and received small gifts from Henry VII. She was present at the birth of her granddaughter Margaret at Westminster Palace in November 1489 and at the birth of her grandson, the future Henry VIII, at Greenwich Palace in June 1491. Her daughter Elizabeth of York, wife of Henry VII, visited her on occasion at Bermondsey, although another of her daughters, Cecily of York, visited her more often.

Henry VII briefly contemplated marrying his mother-in-law to King James III of Scotland, when James III's wife, Margaret of Denmark, died in 1486. James was killed in battle in 1488.

Elizabeth Woodville died at Bermondsey Abbey, on 8 June 1492. With the exception of the queen, who was awaiting the birth of her fourth child, and Cecily of York, her daughters attended the funeral at Windsor Castle: Anne of York (the future wife of Thomas Howard), Catherine of York (the future Countess of Devon) and Bridget of York (a nun at Dartford Priory). Elizabeth's will specified a simple ceremony. The surviving accounts of her funeral on 12 June 1492 suggest that at least one source "clearly felt that a queen's funeral should have been more splendid" and may have objected that "Henry VII had not been fit to arrange a more queenly funeral for his mother-in-law", although simplicity was the queen dowager's own wish. In fact, Henry VII contributed to the costs of Elizabeth's funeral through the provision of cloth. A letter discovered in 2019, written in 1511 by Andrea Badoer, the Venetian ambassador in London, suggests that she had died of plague, which would explain the haste and lack of public ceremony. Elizabeth was laid to rest in the same chantry as her husband King Edward IV in St. George's Chapel, Windsor Castle.

== Issue ==
By John Grey, Elizabeth had:

- Thomas Grey, Earl of Huntingdon, Marquess of Dorset and Lord Ferrers de Groby (1455 – 20 September 1501), married first Anne Holland, but she died young without issue; he married second on 18 July 1474, Cecily Bonville, suo jure Baroness Harington and Bonville, with whom he had fourteen children. The disputed queen Lady Jane Grey is a direct descendant of this line.
- Richard Grey (1457 – 25 June 1483) was executed at Pontefract Castle.

By King Edward IV, Elizabeth had:

- Elizabeth of York (11 February 1466 – 11 February 1503), queen of England as the wife of Henry VII (reigned 1485–1509), mother of Henry VIII
- Mary of York (11 August 1467 – 23 May 1482), buried in St George's Chapel, Windsor Castle
- Cecily of York (20 March 1469 – 24 August 1507), Viscountess Welles
- Edward V of England (2 November 1470 – c. 1483), one of the Princes in the Tower
- Margaret of York (10 April 1472 – 11 December 1472), buried in Westminster Abbey
- Richard, Duke of York (17 August 1473 – c. 1483), one of the Princes in the Tower
- Anne of York (2 November 1475 – 23 November 1511), Lady Howard
- George, Duke of Bedford (March 1477 – March 1479), buried in St George's Chapel, Windsor Castle
- Catherine of York (14 August 1479 – 15 November 1527), Countess of Devon
- Bridget of York (10 November 1480 – 1507), nun at Dartford Priory, Kent

== In literature ==
One of only three lyric poems in Middle English ascribed to a woman author, alongside "An Anchoress' Hymn to the Virgin" and "Eleanor Percy's Prayer", "My heart is set upon a lusty pin" is attributed to one "Queen Elizabeth", sometimes thought to have been Elizabeth Woodville (although the author is also argued to have been her daughter, Elizabeth of York). This hymn to Venus, found in one single manuscript, is a complex six-stanza poem with rhyme scheme ABABBAA, an "elaboration of the sestina", in which the seventh line of each stanza is the same as its first, and the six unique lines of the first stanza provide the first lines for each of the poem's six stanzas.

=== Non-fiction ===
- Elizabeth Woodville: Mother of the Princes in the Tower (2002) by David Baldwin
- Elizabeth Wydeville: The Slandered Queen (2005) by Arlene Okerlund
- The Women of the Cousins' War (2011) by Philippa Gregory, David Baldwin and Michael Jones. The book deals with Jacquetta of Luxembourg (mother of Elizabeth Woodville) (chapter written by Philippa Gregory), Elizabeth Woodville (chapter written by David Baldwin), and Lady Margaret Beaufort (mother of Elizabeth Woodville's son-in-law King Henry VII) (chapter written by Michael Jones)
- Elizabeth Woodville (2013) by David MacGibbon
- The Woodvilles: The Wars of the Roses and England's Most Infamous Family (2013) by Susan Higginbotham
- Edward IV and Elizabeth Woodville: A True Romance (2016) by Amy Licence
- Hollman, Gemma (1 September 2020). Royal Witches: Witchcraft and the Nobility in Fifteenth-Century England. Pegasus Books. ISBN 978-1-64313-395-9.

=== Fiction ===
Edward IV's love for his wife is celebrated in sonnet 75 of Philip Sidney's Astrophel and Stella, written in 1586 and first published in 1591.

She appears in two of Shakespeare's plays: Henry VI Part 3 (written by 1592), in which she is a fairly minor character, and Richard III (written approx. 1592), where she has a central role. Shakespeare portrays Elizabeth as a proud and alluring woman in Henry VI Part 3. By Richard III, she is careworn from having to defend herself against detractors in the court, including her titular brother-in-law, Richard. She spends much of the play bemoaning her fate as family members and supporters of her are killed, including her two young sons. She is one of Richard's cleverest opponents and among the few who see through him from the beginning, though she is mostly powerless to stop him once he murders her allies in the court. Although most modern editions of Henry VI Part 3 and Richard III call her "Queen Elizabeth" in the stage directions, the original Shakespearean Folio never actually refer to her by name, instead calling her first "Lady Grey" and later simply "Queen".

Novels that feature Elizabeth Woodville as a character include:

- The Last of the Barons by Edward Bulwer-Lytton Available online.
- Dickon (1929) by Marjorie Bowen.
- The Daughter of Time (1951), Josephine Tey's classic mystery.
- The White Rose (1969) by Jan Westcott.
- The King's Grey Mare (1972) by Rosemary Hawley Jarman, a fictionalised biography of Elizabeth Woodville.
- The Woodville Wench (published in US as The Queen Who Never Was) (1972) by Maureen Peters.
- The Sunne in Splendour (1982) by Sharon Kay Penman.
- The Sun in Splendour (1982) by Jean Plaidy.
- A Secret Alchemy (2009) by Emma Darwin.
- The White Queen (2009) by Philippa Gregory, which borrows Rosemary Hawley Jarman's supernatural elements from The King's Grey Mare. Elizabeth Woodville also appears in other novels in Gregory's Cousins' War series.
- The King's Grace (2009) by Anne Easter Smith The life of Edward IV's illegitimate daughter who spent many years in service of the Dowager Queen.
- The Kingmaker's Daughter (2012) by Philippa Gregory.
- Das Spiel der Könige, a historical novel in German by Rebecca Gablé.
- Bloodline (2015) and Ravenspur (2016), in the "War of Roses" series by Conn Iggulden
- The Last White Rose (2022) by Alison Weir.
- The Golden Widows (2014) by Isolde Martyn.

=== Opera ===
Elizabeth Woodville is the main character in Alexander Voltz's two-act chamber opera Edward and Richard: The True Story of the Princes in the Tower (2021). In a twist ending, the opera suggests that she murdered the Princes in the Tower.

== Media portrayals ==
=== Film ===
- Richard III (1911): Woodville was played by Violet Farebrother
- Richard III (1912): Woodville was played by Carey Lee.
- In the French film, Les enfants d'Édouard (1914), Woodville was played by Jeanne Delvair.
- Jane Shore (1915): Woodville was played by Maud Yates.
- Tower of London (1939): Woodville was played by Barbara O'Neil.
- Richard III (1955): Woodville was portrayed by Mary Kerridge.
- In the Hungarian TV movie III. Richárd (1973) Woodville was played by Rita Békés.
- Richard III (1995): Woodville was played by Annette Bening.
- Looking for Richard (1996): Woodville was played by Penelope Allen.
- Richard III (2005): Woodville was played by Caroline Burns Cooke.
- Richard III (2007): Woodville was played by María Conchita Alonso.

=== Television ===
- An Age of Kings (1960): Woodville was portrayed by Jane Wenham.
- Wars of the Roses (1965): Woodville was played by Susan Engel.
- The Shadow of the Tower (1972): Woodville was played by Stephanie Bidmead
- The Third Part of Henry the Sixth and The Tragedy of Richard III (1983): Woodville was played by Rowena Cooper.
- The White Queen (2013): Woodville was portrayed by Rebecca Ferguson.
- The Hollow Crown, Henry VI and Richard III (2016): Woodville was played by Keeley Hawes.
- The White Princess (2017): Woodville was played by Essie Davis.

=== Music ===
- In 2020, Vicki Manser portrayed Elizabeth Woodville on the cast recording of A Mother's War, a musical based on the Wars of the Roses.

== Schools named after Elizabeth Woodville ==
- Elizabeth Woodville Primary School, Groby, Leicestershire (1971).
- Elizabeth Woodville Secondary School, Roade, Northamptonshire (2011).

== Arms ==
Coat of arms of Elizabeth Woodville
| Escutcheon Elizabeth Woodville's arms as queen consort were the royal arms of her husband King Edward IV impaling the arms inherited from her parents Richard Woodville & Jacquetta of Luxembourg. Husband's arms: quarterly — 1st & 4th, Azure three fleurs de lys two and one Or (France Moderne); 2nd & 3rd, Gules three lions passant guardant in pale Or armed and langued Azure (England) Parental arms: quarterly of six — 1st, Argent a lion rampant double queued Gules crowned Or (Luxembourg, her mother's family); 2nd, quarterly, I and IV Gules a star of eight points Argent II and III Azure, semée of fleurs de lys Or (Baux); 3rd, barry Argent and Azure overall a lion rampant Gules (Lusignan); 4th, Gules three bendlets Argent on a chief of the first charged with a fillet in base Or a rose of the second (Orsini); 5th, Gules three pallets vairy on a chief or a label of five points Azure (Châtillon); 6th, Argent a fess and a canton conjoined Gules (Woodville) Supporters Dexter a lion Argent sinister a greyhound Argent collared Gules. |

== Notes ==
English royalty
| Vacant Title last held by Margaret of Anjou | Queen consort of England; Lady of Ireland; 1 May 1464 – 3 October 1470 | Succeeded by Margaret of Anjou |
| Vacant Title last held by Margaret of Anjou | Queen consort of England; Lady of Ireland; 11 April 1471 – 9 April 1483 | Vacant Title next held by Anne Neville |
