= Margaret of York (1472) =

English princess

- Born: 10 April 1472; Winchester Castle, Hampshire, England
- Died: 11 December 1472 (aged 8 months 1 day)
- Burial: Westminster Abbey
- House: York
- Father: Edward IV
- Mother: Elizabeth Woodville

Margaret of York (10 April 1472 – 11 December 1472) was a namesake niece of Margaret of York, Duchess of Burgundy. She was the fifth child and fourth daughter of Edward IV of England and Elizabeth Woodville.

She was a younger sister of Elizabeth of York, Mary of York, Cecily of York and Edward V of England and older sister of Richard of Shrewsbury, 1st Duke of York, Anne of York, George Plantagenet, Duke of Bedford, Catherine of York and Bridget of York.

She was born in Winchester Castle but died of natural causes eight months later. She was buried in Westminster Abbey.

Margaret's sarcophagus was originally placed to fit in the steps of the shrine of St. Edward the Confessor, but it was moved to the edge of the chapel at the time of the dissolution of the monasteries. The step edging around the sides can, however, still be seen.

An annotated history of the Abbey in the Abbey's library states that the lid was removed in more modern times and the sarcophagus found to be empty. The monumental brass originally on the top of Margaret's tomb is long since missing, but the original wording around the edge and on the surface plaque was recorded historically.
