= Queen of Ireland (disambiguation) =

Queen of Ireland was a title for the Irish monarch.

Queen of Ireland or The Queen of Ireland may also refer to:

== Royalty ==
- A female Irish monarch
  - Mary I of England (1516–1558; r. 1553–1558)
  - Elizabeth I (1533–1603; r. 1558–1603)
  - Mary II (1662–1694; r. 1689–1694)
  - Anne, Queen of Great Britain (1665–1714; r. 1702–1714)
- A female Irish royal consort (i.e. spouse of an Irish monarch)
- An erroneous reference to Queen Victoria of the United Kingdom (1819–1901; r. 1837–1901), whose primary realm included Ireland

== Other uses ==
- Our Lady of Knock, Queen of Ireland, to whom the Knock Shrine in Ireland is dedicated
- The Queen of Ireland, a 1960 drama by James Hanley
- The Queen of Ireland, a 2015 Irish documentary about drag queen Rory O'Neill
- The Queen of Ireland: An Historical Account of Ireland's Devotion to the Blessed Virgin, a 1938 book by Helena Concannon

== See also ==
- Queen of England (disambiguation)
- Scottish queen (disambiguation)
