= Scottish queen =

Scottish queen, Queen of Scots, or Queen of Scotland may refer to:

== Royalty ==
- A female Scottish monarch
  - Mary, Queen of Scots (1542–1587; r. 1542–1567)
  - Mary II (1662–1694; r. 1689–1694)
  - Anne (1665–1714; r. 1702–1714), Queen of Scotland until 1707 and subsequently Queen of Great Britain, which included Scotland
- A female Scottish royal consort (i.e. female spouse of a Scottish monarch)
- A technically erroneous reference to a female British monarch
  - Victoria (1819–1901; r. 1837–1901), Queen of the United Kingdom, which includes Scotland
  - Elizabeth II (1926–2022; r. 1952–2022), Queen of the United Kingdom, which includes Scotland
- A technically erroneous reference to a female British royal consort (i.e. female spouse of a British monarch)

== Other uses ==
- Queen of Scots (train), in service from 1985 to 1990
- Scottish Queen, a horse that was the 1869 winner of the 1000 Guineas Stakes
- Scottish Queen, a naval trawler that sunk on 3 May 1915 during World War I
- SS Queen of Scotland, a 19th century paddle steamer
- Jennie Quigley (1850–1936), whose stage name was The Queen of Scotland
- The Queen of Scotland, a folk song

== See also ==
- Mary, Queen of Scots (disambiguation)
- Queen of England (disambiguation)
- Queen of Ireland (disambiguation)
