= Queen Anne of England =

Queen Anne of England or Anne, Queen of England may refer to:

- Anne of Bohemia (1366–1394), first queen consort of Richard II, King of England
- Anne Neville (1456–1485), queen consort of Richard III, King of England
- Anne Boleyn (c. 1501 or 1507 – 1536), second queen consort of Henry VIII, King of England
- Anne of Cleves (1515–1557), fourth queen consort of Henry VIII, King of England
- Anne of Denmark (1574–1619), queen consort of James I, King of England
- Anne, Queen of Great Britain (1665–1714), Queen of England (r. 1702–1707) and subsequently Queen of Great Britain (r. 1707–1714)

== See also ==
- Anne Hyde (1637–1671), first wife of James, Duke of York, (later James II, King of England) and mother of Mary II, Queen of England, and Anne, Queen of Great Britain
- Anne Stuart (disambiguation)
- Queen Anne (disambiguation)
