= Mary of York =

English princess (1467–1482)

- Born: 11 August 1467; Windsor Castle, Berkshire, England
- Died: 23 May 1482 (aged 14); Palace of Placentia, Greenwich, London, England
- Burial: 28 May 1482; St George's Chapel, Windsor Castle
- House: York
- Father: Edward IV
- Mother: Elizabeth Woodville

Mary of York (11 August 1467 – 23 May 1482) was the second daughter of King Edward IV of England and his queen consort Elizabeth Woodville.

The first years of Mary's life were spent in close connection with her older sister Elizabeth of York (later Queen consort of England), who was eighteen months older. The princesses were raised and religiously educated together and were accustomed from childhood to frequent moves between royal residences. From time to time, the girls were called to the court, where they were present at the festivities and during state visits. Also, a strict daily routine was provided for the princesses, and special attention was paid to their safety. It is noteworthy that in the accounts dating back to the childhood of the princesses, there are almost no expenses for toys.

In 1469, Mary's father had a conflict with his longtime supporter the Earl of Warwick, who, in alliance with Mary's uncle the Duke of Clarence and the former Queen Margaret of Anjou, had mutinied against the King. Soon Edward IV was removed from the throne, and Mary with her mother and sisters found refuge in Westminster Abbey, where they spent the next five months. Mary's younger brother Edward was also born while the family lived under asylum, and his birth spurred the princess's father to accelerate the reconquest of his kingdom. In April 1471, Edward IV returned London to his rule and immediately moved the family from the refuge to the residence of his mother, and then to the Tower of London.

After the final defeat of the Warwick party and the restoration of peace in the country, Mary and her older sister began to look for suitors. Elizabeth was supposed to be the wife of the Dauphin Charles, heir of the French throne, with Mary as a replacement for her older sister in case of her premature death or other obstacle to marriage. In 1481, the Danish prince Frederick, Duke of Holstein and Schleswig (later King Frederick I) was supposed to be Mary's fiancé, but when negotiations were underway for marriage, she fell seriously ill and died.

== Birth and early years ==
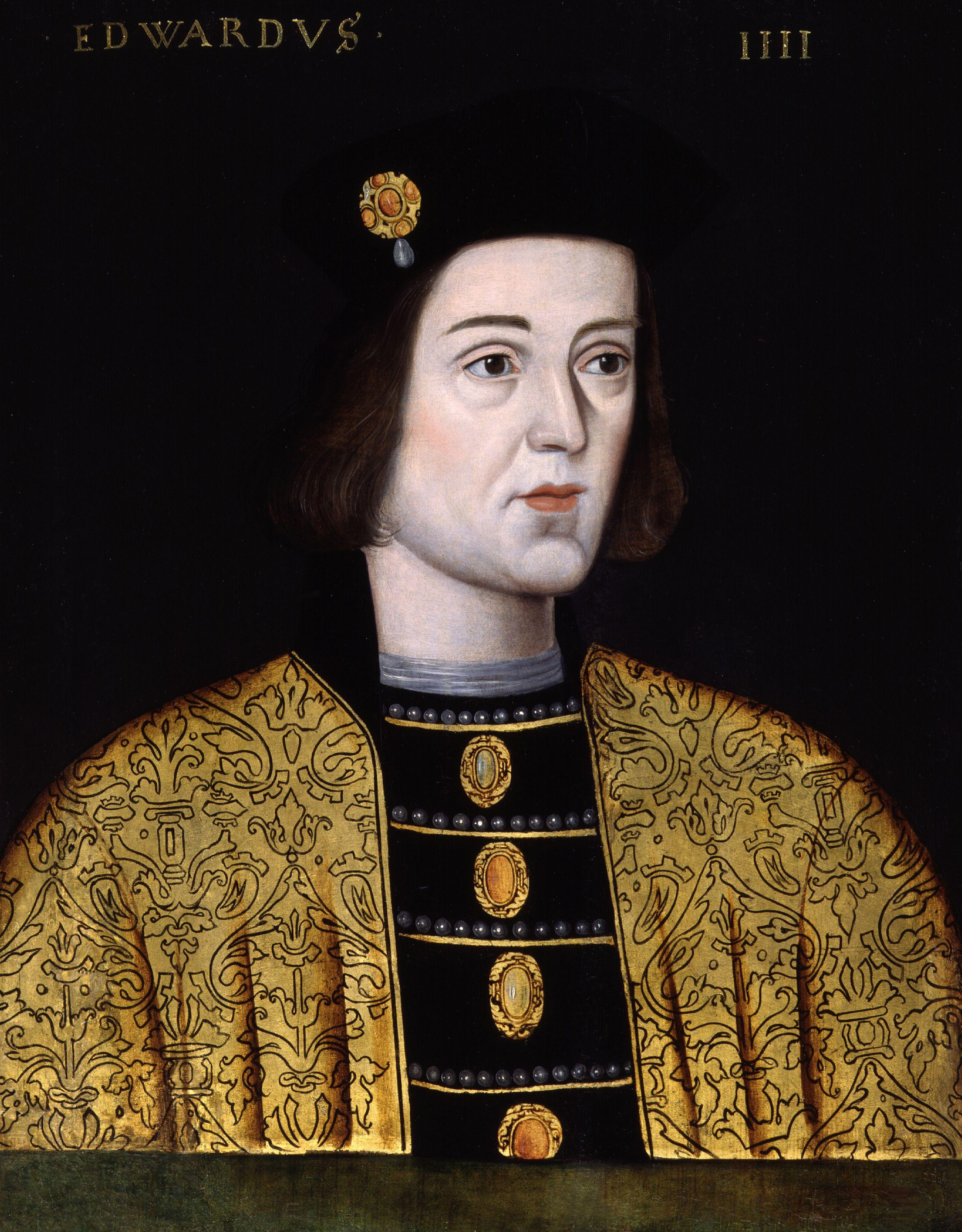
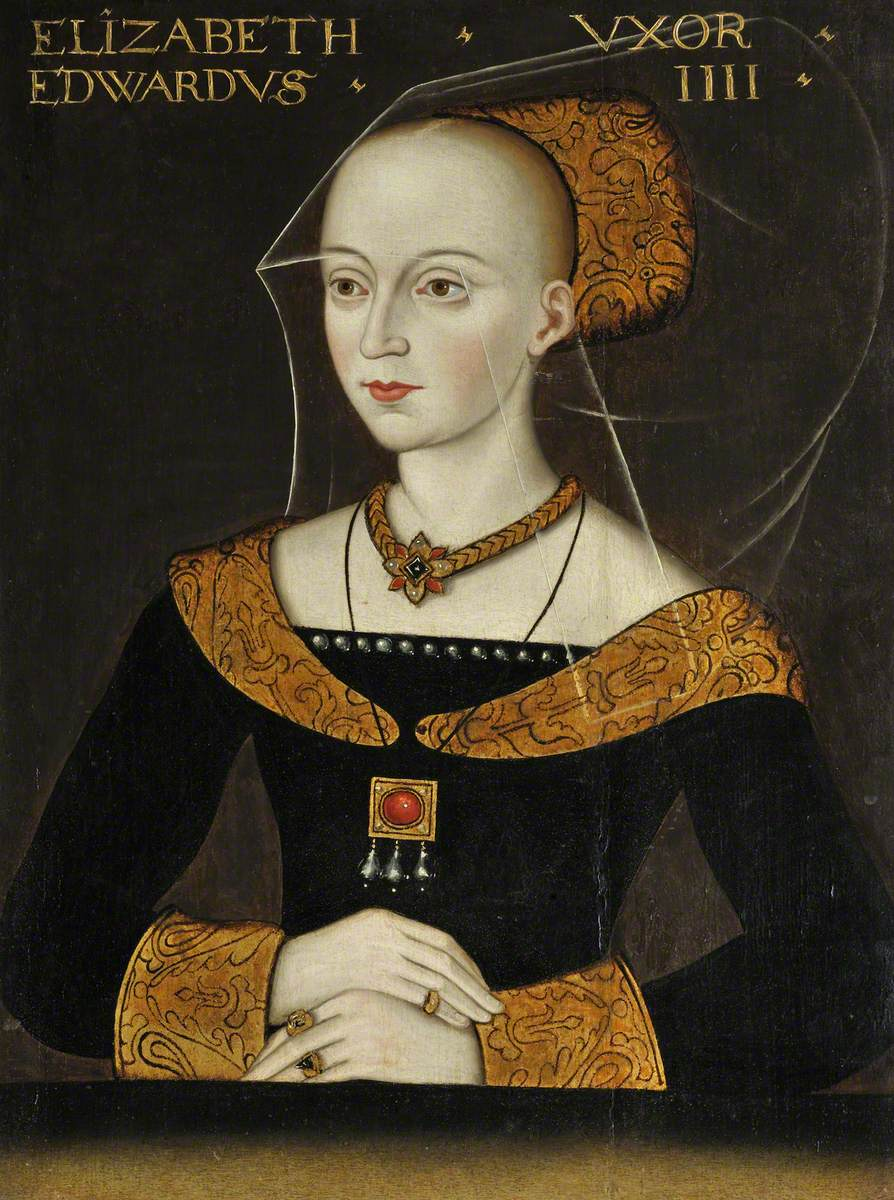
(left) Portrait of Edward IV, now at the National Portrait Gallery, London, c. 1597–1618 (right) Portrait of Elizabeth Woodville from the collection of Queens' College, Cambridge, c. 1471

Mary was born on 11 August 1467 at Windsor Castle as the second daughter of children of King Edward IV and Elizabeth Woodville; being the second child of her parents' ten children, the princess also had two half-brothers from her mother's first marriage to John Grey of Groby: Thomas and Richard Grey. Her paternal grandparents were Richard of York, 3rd Duke of York (who claimed the rights of the House of York to the English throne) and Cecily Neville, and her maternal grandparents were Richard Woodville, 1st Earl Rivers, and Jacquetta of Luxembourg, Dowager Duchess of Bedford. The girl was baptized shortly after birth; among her sponsors was the Archbishop of Canterbury and Cardinal Thomas Bourchier.

In 1467, the King granted his wife lifelong use of Sheen Palace in Surrey, where the royal nursery was organized: according to tradition, royal offspring were brought up away from London and the court for their safety and health. Here, Mary, along with her older sister Elizabeth (born 11 February 1466), was brought up under the guidance of a governess Lady Margaret Berners (wife of John Bourchier, 1st Baron Berners, great-grandson of King Edward III and a close friend of the Queen Elizabeth's family); Lady Margaret received a salary of £100 for her services (as of 2013 – £50,000) per year. In Sheen Palace, Mary, together with Elizabeth, spent her infancy and part of her childhood; in addition to the governess, the princesses were given an extensive staff of servants and £400 a year for their needs (as of 2013 – about £200,000). The princesses also used to travel a lot from childhood, as the royal couple, along with their children and a vast court, traveled between a hundred royal residences, located mostly in the Thames valley.

== Religious upbringing and court life ==
The religious education of the royal offspring began at a very early age, and by the age of four, the children should have known the psalter. Feast days, in particular the Presentation of the Lord, Easter, Saint George's Day, Trinity, All Saints' Day and the Nativity of Christ, as well as saints' days, were marked with special services in the chapel, sermons and entertainment; Elizabeth and Mary these days made offerings during Mass. On Maundy Thursday, girls gave gifts to the poor; on Good Friday they were taught to crawl to the cross on their knees. During the Great Lent and the Advent fasts, girls were required to fast or abstain from meat. On New Year's Eve, the princesses received gifts, and on the Twelfth Night they were allowed to join in the celebrations and feast.

From time to time, little princesses were called to the court, where they were present at festivals and during state visits. At court, Elizabeth and Mary joined their mother's retinue, learning from her example and that of her ladies' manners, music, singing, dancing, embroidery and everything that was considered necessary to prepare them for the role of future wives of kings, mothers and "decorations of the court". The girls dressed in miniature versions of the lavish outfits worn by noble ladies, and also learned as they got older how to handle heavy fabrics, long trains, and elaborate headdresses. Princesses were taught good manners from an early age and were brought up in the deepest respect for their parents, whom they did not see often; every night they were together.

== Daily routine ==
The daily routine followed by Mary and Elizabeth was probably similar to that which was later set by the King for their brother Edward when he was three years old; it may also have been based on customs described in the household books of their paternal uncle George, Duke of Clarence. The children were awakened at approximately six o'clock in the morning so that they could "get up at a convenient hour according to [their] age" to attend morning prayer in their bedroom. Then the bell informed them that it was time to go to Mass, which was celebrated by the house chaplain at the local chapel. Regular observance of liturgical services was seen as a necessity for the royal children. Immediately after mass, the princesses ate breakfast; the likely ingredients for breakfast were bread, butter, ale, fish, meat, or eggs. Their main meal was served to the princesses at ten or eleven o'clock in the morning; the meal itself was a "noble service" of dishes "brought by revered people" and squires in livery, and could last up to two hours. While eating, the sisters were read instructive and noble stories; in addition, King Edward IV insisted that there should be no "brawlers, hooligans, dangerous people or adulterers" in the homes of his children, and all conversation in their presence should be "virtuous, honest ... and wise". After the midday meal, the princesses would take a bath and perhaps get an afternoon nap. Later, drinks and bread were brought to the girls, after which the bell called everyone to Vespers. Dinner was served at four o'clock in the evening. The rest of the evening was spent by the princesses in entertainment such as games and music; the King's daughters went to bed at about eight o'clock in the evening, having previously received a snack in the form of bread, ale or wine and other products. It is noteworthy that in the accounts of the court of the princesses of this period, toys are hardly mentioned.

The safety of the princesses was given special attention. After the doors of the chambers of Mary and Elizabeth were locked at eight o'clock in the evening, no one except the personal servants of the princesses could enter them. At night, a burning candle or torch was left in the girls' bedroom; the outer gates were locked at nine o'clock in the evening in winter and at ten in summer. The guards went around the castle grounds three or four times a night, checking every room. Later, a special person was assigned to Prince Edward, who spent the night in his chambers and monitored the safety and health of the boy at night; probably the princesses also had such a person.

== Crisis of 1469–1471 ==
On 20 March 1469 the Queen gave birth to another daughter, Cecily, which caused serious concern to the King and made him think that his eldest daughter Elizabeth would rule the country after him. A year earlier, rumors had spread at court about an aggravation of enmity between the supporter of the King, the Earl of Warwick and the Queen, whose numerous relatives moved the Earl from court. In that same year, 1468, a final split occurred between Edward IV and Warwick due to the marriage of the King's sister Margaret: Warwick, who had once failed to marry the King to a French princess, wanted to conclude an alliance with France through the marriage of Margaret and a French prince, but Edward IV, following the advice of the Woodvilles, married off his sister to an enemy of France – Charles, Duke of Burgundy, whom Warwick hated and despised. In 1469, a feud between Warwick and the royal couple led to an alliance between the Earl and the King's younger brother, George, Duke of Clarence, whose position as heir to the throne was threatened by the idea of Edward IV appointing his eldest daughter as his successor.

Earlier, even at a time when the King was close to Warwick, the Earl wanted to marry his daughters Isabella and Anne, who were the richest heiresses in England, to the King's brothers, but Edward IV refused him, fearing the rise of the Nevilles. In July 1469 Clarence openly disobeyed his brother by marrying Warwick's eldest daughter at Calais; then both of them landed with troops in England and announced George's claim to the English throne, declaring Edward IV was illegitimate, born of Cecily Neville's affair with the English archer Blaybourne. At this time, Mary's mother, along with at least two daughters, one of whom was Elizabeth, visited Norwich, where they were received with magnificent celebrations and theatrical performances; It is not known for certain which of the two younger princesses at that time accompanied her mother, however, it was probably Mary, since Cecily was too small. The Queen and princesses were settled in the house of the monk-preachers; here the royal family received news that Warwick had not only won the Battle of Edgcote, but also captured the King, and also executed without trial Mary's maternal grandfather and uncle, Earl Rivers and John Woodville. It is not known how the grandfather's death affected the little princesses, but most likely the Queen hid what happened from the children. At the same time, Mary's maternal grandmother, Jacquetta of Luxembourg, was arrested after being accused of witchcraft and the use of love spells of the King. Although Jacquetta was acquitted, this unpleasant episode, as well as the unmotivated execution of Earl Rivers, showed how far the enemies of Edward IV were ready to go to destroy his wife and her family. Despite all this, the Queen herself and her daughters were not harmed during Warwick's brief rise, except that Mary's mother was assigned a reduced staff of servants.

By the autumn of 1469, Edward IV managed to gain freedom and already in September he entered London in triumph, where he began to lure the nobles back to his side. In the winter of 1470, the King regained full control of the government and declared Warwick and Clarence traitors; both of them fled to France, where by July 1470 Warwick managed to conclude an alliance with the former Queen Margaret of Anjou, who wanted to put her husband or son on the throne; as a part of the alliance, the former Prince of Wales married Warwick's second daughter. In September 1470, Edward IV prepared for an invasion by the combined forces of Warwick and Margaret of Anjou. For their safety, Mary, her sisters, and her mother were moved to the Tower of London. Anticipating a future crisis, the Queen ordered the Tower to be fortified and security increased. Elizabeth Woodville was in her seventh month of pregnancy and a maternity ward was prepared for her, but she failed to use it: Warwick invaded England, and in early October news appeared in London that Mary's father, along with his younger brother Richard, Duke of Gloucester, had fled the country, having only an illusory hope for a return. On 6 October Warwick and Clarence entered the City of London, and King Henry VI was formally re-enthroned.

Having received news of her husband's fall, Queen Elizabeth, along with her mother and three daughters, including Mary, hurriedly left the Tower in the middle of the night on a barge and arrived in search of refuge at Westminster Abbey, where she was known as a very pious woman. When the royal family arrived at the hideout, the Abbey was nearly empty; the Abbot of Westminster Thomas Milling took them under his protection –a kind, hospitable man, he did not want to place the Queen and princesses with criminals and gave them his house at the western entrance to the Abbey, where there were three rooms and everything necessary for the convenience of the royal family. Also, they were assisted by ordinary Londoners: the butcher John Gould donated half a cow and two sheep a week to the family of King Edward IV, and the fishmonger provided them with provisions on Fridays and fasting days.

While in hiding, the princesses spent most of their time with nannies, as Queen Elizabeth was busy with the birth and subsequent care of Prince Edward, who was born in early November 1470. Mary and her family spent another five months in the shelter. In April 1471, the princess's father, spurred on by the news of the birth of his son, returned to England and, first of all, after attending a thanksgiving service in Westminster Abbey, took his family out of hiding. On the same night, Mary, along with other family members, was transported to Baynard's Castle, which served as the residence of her paternal grandmother, Cecily Neville. On 11 April, the Queen and her children, accompanied by the King's mother, the Queen's brother Anthony Woodville, and the Archbishop of Canterbury Thomas Bourchier, set out for the Royal Apartments in the Tower of London, while Mary's father went north to reclaim the crown. On 14 April, Warwick was killed at the Battle of Barnet, and on 4 May Edward IV finally defeated the Lancastrian troops at the Battle of Tewkesbury, in which the Lancastrian heir Edward of Westminster was killed and Margaret of Anjou was captured. However, on 12 May, while Edward IV was still on his way to London, the last supporters of the House of Lancaster organized an attack on the Tower, intending to restore Henry VI to the throne; two towers were fired from the river, in one of which was Mary and her family. The attack was repulsed, but this forced Edward IV to put his predecessor to death, and on 21 May 1471 Henry VI was murdered in his dungeon.

== Final years, marriage plans and death ==
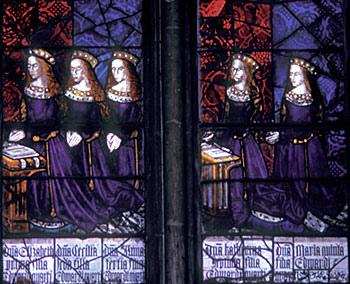
Daughters of King Edward IV. Stained glass window of the northwest transept of Canterbury Cathedral, 16th century. Mary is depicted in the far right. (Note: The stained glass window was made by order of Edward IV by the royal master William Neuve after the birth of his sixth (but fifth surviving) daughter Catherine in August 1479, but before November 1480 – when was born his youngest daughter Bridget. More recent research has determined the order of the sisters in the stained glass window as Elizabeth, Cecily, Anne, Catherine and Mary, however it is more likely that the York princesses are arranged in seniority on the stained glass window and Mary is depicted second from left.)

At the end of 1474, Edward IV, who was preparing to invade France, signed a will, according to which Mary and her older sister Elizabeth were to receive a dowry of 10,000 marks, on the condition that the princesses in the matter of marriage would be submissive to their mother and brother-King. However, only two months later, Edward IV concluded a peace treaty with France, one of the conditions of which was the marriage of Mary's elder sister to the Dauphin Charles, heir of the French throne, when she reached the age of marriageable consent; in the event of the premature death of Elizabeth, Mary herself became the substitute bride of the Dauphin; however, in 1481, she, apparently, was betrothed to Frederick, Duke of Holstein and Schleswig (youngest son of King Christian I of Denmark), which meant that France's spare bride was no longer needed. According to other sources, the betrothal never took place: marriage negotiations, shortly after they began, were stopped due to the deteriorating health of the princess. Previously, the elder brother of Frederick, John, Hereditary Prince of Denmark, was called a possible suitor of Mary, but it is not known whether marriage negotiations were ever started.

In 1476, Mary, among others, attended the reburial ceremony for the remains of her paternal grandfather, the Duke of York, and his second son, Edmund, Earl of Rutland, at Fotheringay. In 1478, Mary attended the wedding of her younger brother, Richard, Duke of York, and Anne de Mowbray, 8th Countess of Norfolk. In May 1480, she, alongside her younger sister, Cecily, was made a Lady of the Garter; their older sister, Elizabeth, had already been named a Lady of the Garter in February of the same year. In addition, there is no information on how Mary lived in her later years; documents of this period contain only information about the political situation in the country and do not affect the private life of the younger members of the royal family.

At the end of 1481, Mary fell ill and died on 23 May 1482 in the Palace of Placentia. The body of the princess was not embalmed, but was dressed in rich clothes and put up for farewell in a church in Greenwich. On the same day a memorial mass was celebrated by the Bishop of Norwich James Goldwell; another service was held the next day in the presence of many religious figures and representatives of the nobility: the Bishop of Chichester Edward Story, the Barons Dacre, Dudley and Beauchamp and the Bishop of Salisbury Richard Beauchamp. Mary's coffin was taken in a magnificent procession to St George's Chapel at Windsor Castle and was buried in the southeastern part of the chapel, next to Prince George, the third son of Edward IV and Elizabeth Woodville, who died in infancy. The mourners at Mary's funeral were the Queen's sister Lady Grey, Lady Catherine Grey, Lady Strange, Baroness Dacre and other ladies. Baroness Dacre, after the death of Mary's younger brother George, served as maid of honor and governess to the princess. The third and last mass was celebrated after the funeral for commoners.

In 1789, a worker carrying out repairs to the chapel accidentally discovered and opened the tomb of King Edward IV and his wife Elizabeth Woodville. In a room adjacent to the crypt, the coffins of two children were found – presumed at the time to be George and Mary. However, in 1810, places were being prepared in the chapel for the burial of members of the family of King George III, and the remains of two more children were found in another room; some remains, well preserved, fell under the parameters of Mary. Thus, it is not known whose remains were buried next to the grave of Edward IV and his wife.
