= Dartford Priory =

Historic property in Dartford, England

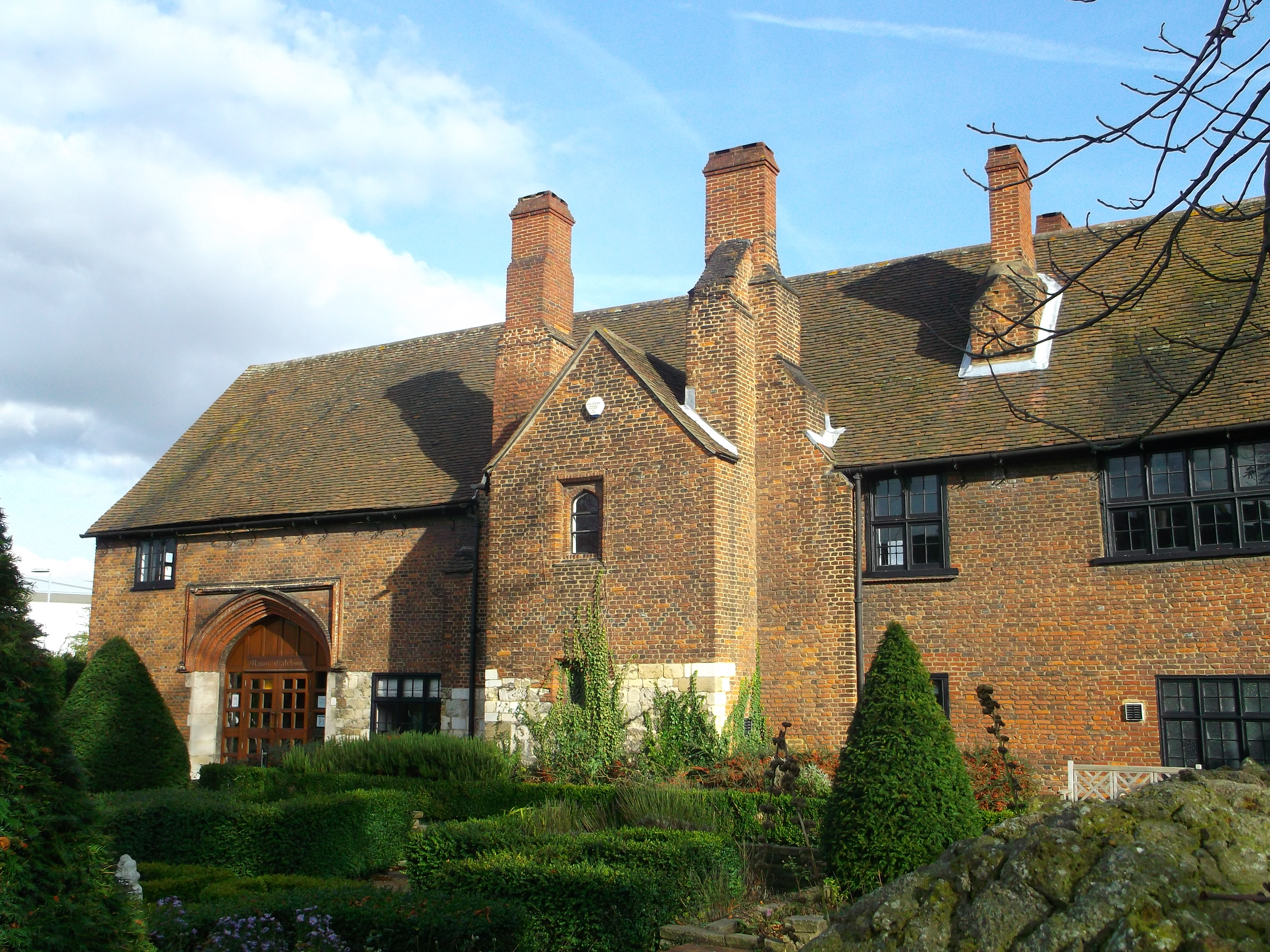
- Dartford Manor Gatehouse, in October 2012
- Interactive map of Dartford Priory

Monastery information
- Other names: Dartford Manor; Dartford Nunnery; Dertford Priory
- Order: Dominican
- Denomination: Catholic
- Established: 1346
- Disestablished: 1539, 1559
- Reestablished: 1558
- Dedication: St Mary, St Margaret

People
- Founder: Edward III
- Important associated figures: Elizabeth Cressener

Architecture
- Heritage designation: Grade II* (farmhouse)
- Designated date: 22 December 1953
- Style: Gothic

Site
- Location: Dartford, Kent
- Country: England
- Coordinates: 51°26′52″N 0°12′50″E
- Grid reference: TQ 53938 74402
- Visible remains: Farmhouse, gatehouse, Kingsfield Terrace
- Public access: no

Dartford Priory was a Dominican Nunnery, located in Dartford, Kent. When Henry VIII suppressed the monasteries, he took Dartford Priory for himself, establishing it as a Royal Palace. Between 1541 and 1544 the former ecclesiastical buildings were converted to become a manor house.

== Foundation ==
Edward III announced the foundation of Dartford Priory in 1346 on his return from the victorious campaign in France against Philip VI of France culminating in the Battle of Crecy. This inauguration of the priory was accompanied by a tournament, a way of celebrating favoured by Edward III. The King previously staged tournaments at Dartford twice before: firstly at the age of seventeen in 1329, after he had assumed the throne but still under the control of his step father Roger Mortimer who assumed the role as his guardian and effectively ruled the Kingdom. Tension rose between Edward III and Mortimer which led to Edward taking Mortimer prisoner and executing him in 1330. Edward organised a series of tournaments in 1331, and Dartford was chosen to host one of these.

== Prioresses and notable nuns ==
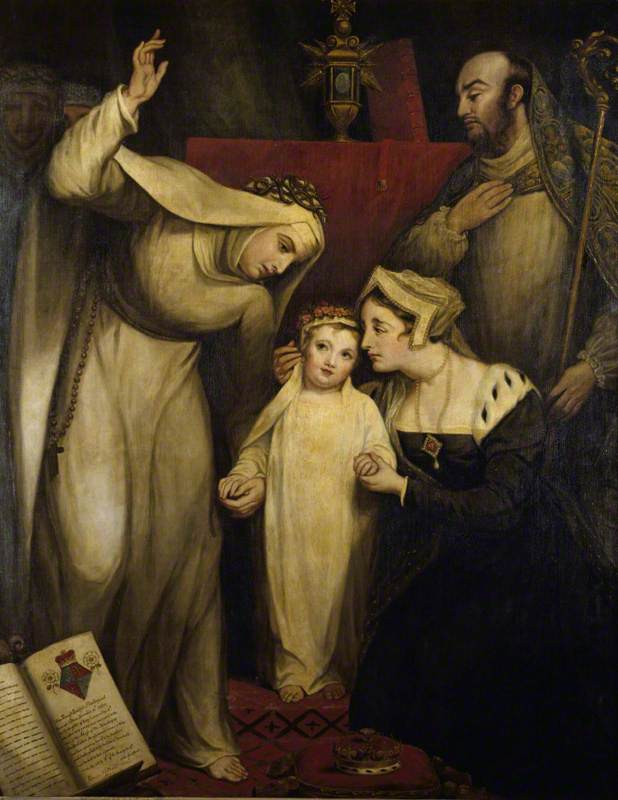
Dedication of Bridget to the nunnery at Dartford, painting by James Northcote (1822). National Trust, Petworth House, West Sussex.

The prioresses were as follows (with dates of record)

- Matilda, 1356, 1372
- Jane Barwe, c. 1377, 1400
- Maud, 1413
- Rose, 1421, 1428, 1432
- Margaret Beaumont, 1446, 1460, daughter of Henry Beaumont, 5th Baron Beaumont
- Alice Branthwait, 1461, 1465, 1467
- Joan, daughter of Lord Scrope of Bolton, c. 1470
- Beatrice, 1474
- Alice Branthwayt, 1475, 1479
- Anne Barn, 1481
- Alice, 1487, 1488 (fn. 168)
- Elizabeth Cressener, 1488 or 1489-1537
- Joan Fane, 1537
- Elizabeth Cressener, 1557

Other nuns: Sometime between 1489 and 1492, Bridget of York became a nun under the care of Elizabeth Cressener.

== Dissolution ==
Dartford Priory played a significant role in the dissolution of the monasteries.
