= Mary Stuart =

Mary Stuart or Mary Stewart may refer to:

== People ==
- Mary Stewart (daughter of Robert III) (c. 1380 – c. 1460), Scottish princess
- Mary Stewart, Countess of Buchan (before 1428–1465), fifth daughter of James I of Scotland, 1st Countess of Buchan
- Mary of Guelders (c. 1434–1463), queen to James II of Scotland
- Mary Stewart, Countess of Arran (1453–1488), daughter of James II of Scotland
- Mary of Guise (1515–1560), wife of James V of Scotland, mother of Mary, Queen of Scots
- Mary, Queen of Scots (1542–1587), queen regnant of Scotland, wife of Francis II of France and mother of James VI and I
- Mary Stuart (1605–1607), daughter of James VI and I
- Mary Stuart O'Donnell (1607–in or after 1639), Irish noblewoman
- Mary Stewart, Duchess of Richmond (1622–1685), British aristocrat
- Marie Stewart, Countess of Mar (died 1644), Scottish courtier
- Mary, Princess Royal and Princess of Orange (1631–1660), Princess Royal and Princess of Orange-Nassau, daughter of Charles I of England and mother of William III of England
- Mary Stewart, Viscountess Mountjoy (1654–1720)
- Mary of Modena (1658–1718), wife of James II of England (VII of Scotland)
- Mary II (1662–1694), co-ruler of England and Scotland with her husband William III from 1689 until her death
- Mary Stuart, Countess of Bute (1718–1794), British peeress, wife of the British Prime Minister
- Mary Ann Sorden Stuart (1828–1893), American suffragist
- Mary Routh McEnery Stuart (1849–1917), American author
- Mary Arabella Stewart, Countess of Galloway (1850–1903)
- Mary Stewart (social worker) (1862/3–1925), English social worker
- Mary Downie Stewart (1876–1957), New Zealand political hostess and welfare worker
- Mary Stewart, Baroness Stewart of Alvechurch (1903–1984), English Labour politician and educator
- Mary Stewart (novelist) (1916–2014), British novelist
- Mary Stuart (actress) (1926–2002), American actress, best known for her 35-year role in the soap opera Search for Tomorrow
- Mary Stewart (swimmer) (born 1945), Canadian swimmer
- Mary Stewart (runner) (born 1956), British middle-distance runner
- Mary Stuart (academic) (born c. 1957), vice chancellor of the University of Lincoln

== Works ==
The following are all based on the life of Mary, Queen of Scots:

- Mary Stuart (Schiller play) (1800), a tragic play by Friedrich Schiller
- Maria Stuarda (1835), a tragic opera by Gaetano Donizetti based on the play by Schiller
- Mary Stuart (Haynes play) (1840), tragedy by James Haynes
- Marie Stuart (opera) (1844), opera by Louis Niedermeyer
- Mary Stewart (play) (1951), anti-romantic five-act play in Scots by Robert McLellan depicting the Queen's downfall in the months between March 1566 and June 1577
- Mary Stuart (film), a 1927 German silent historical film

== See also ==
- Mary Sturt (1896–1993), British educational psychologist and historian of education
