= Mary Tudor =

Mary Tudor may refer to:

- Mary Tudor, Queen of France (1496–1533), queen of France and princess of England; daughter of Henry VII, wife of Louis XII and then of Charles Brandon, Duke of Suffolk
- Mary I of England (1516–1558), queen of England and Spain – daughter of Henry VIII and Catherine of Aragon
- Lady Mary Tudor (1673–1726), daughter of Charles II and Moll Davis; wife of 2nd Earl of Derwentwater, Henry Graham and James Rooke
- Mary Tudor, graduate student of Wendell Johnson, who conducted the Monster Study
- Marie Tudor, an 1833 play by the French playwright, Victor Hugo, which was based on Mary I of England
  - Mary Tudor (1911 film), a film based on the play by Hugo
  - Mary Tudor (1920 film), a German silent historical film
  - Maria Tudor, an 1879 opera by the Brazilian composer Antônio Carlos Gomes based on the play by Hugo
- Mary Tudor (play), a 1935 British play by Wilfrid Grantham
- Mary Tudor (The Tudors), fictional depiction of Mary I of England
