= Richard Grey =

English knight (c. 1457–1483)

Sir Richard Grey (1457 – 25 June 1483) was an English knight. He was the son of queen consort Elizabeth Woodville and the half-brother of King Edward V of England.

== Early life ==
Richard Grey was the younger son of Sir John Grey of Groby and Elizabeth Woodville. Richard was a 3-year-old child when his father was killed fighting for the House of Lancaster at the Second Battle of St Albans on 17 February 1461. When Richard was 6 his mother married the Yorkist king, Edward IV, in secret, on 1 May 1464. Richard first appeared on the public scene when he took part in the jousts to celebrate the creation of his half-brother Richard as Duke of York in 1474, a feat he repeated at the 4-year old Duke's marriage celebrations in 1478 to the 5-year old Anne de Mowbray.

== Knighthood ==
Grey was knighted in 1475 and was nominated four times to membership of The Most Noble Order of the Garter between 1476 and 1482. His political role also started in 1475, the year he was knighted, when he began to serve in Wales and the bordering English counties as part of the political rule of the council of his other half-brother, Edward, Prince of Wales (later Edward V). Grey served as a justice of the peace in Herefordshire from 1475 and sat at sessions of the peace in Hereford and Ludlow in 1476 and 1477.

== Career as constable ==
In 1479, he was appointed constable of Chester Castle and in the same year was considered important enough for the city of Bristol to appeal to him for his aid. He served on a number of other judicial commissions in the region through the remainder of the reign of his stepfather. In 1482, he was granted the Welsh lordship of Kidwelly, and in the same year was given a greater role in the upbringing of the Prince of Wales. Grey had become a very important person in Edward IV's rule in Wales and the bordering English counties. Grey was also being given a broader geographic field of activity, serving as constable of Wallingford Castle from 1482 and the following year being granted the Holland manors in Essex and Northamptonshire.

== Imprisonment and execution ==
On the death of Edward IV, on 9 April 1483, Grey's half-brother became King Edward V. On 30 April 1483, while accompanying Edward V to London from Wales with their uncle Anthony Woodville, 2nd Earl Rivers, Grey was arrested by Richard, Duke of Gloucester (later Richard III) at Stony Stratford and, with Rivers, imprisoned in the north of England.

Within a few weeks, Grey's lands and offices had been redistributed to others, even though he had not legally been deprived of them.

After Edward V was declared illegitimate, Richard, Duke of Gloucester, acceded to the throne as Richard III. Grey and his uncle were then executed at Pontefract Castle on 25 June 1483. Richard Grey was aged around 26 at the time of his execution.
