= John Grey of Groby =

English knight (c. 1432–1461)

Sir John Grey of Groby
- Arms of Grey: Barry of six argent and azure
- Born: c. 1432
- Died: 17 February 1461 (about 29); St Albans, Hertfordshire
- Spouse: Elizabeth Woodville
- Children: Thomas Grey, 1st Marquess of Dorset; Richard Grey
- Parent(s): Elizabeth Ferrers, 6th Baroness Ferrers of Groby; Edward Grey, 6th Baron Ferrers of Groby

Sir John Grey of Groby, Leicestershire (c. 1432 – 17 February 1461) was a Lancastrian knight, the first husband of Elizabeth Woodville who later married King Edward IV of England, and great-great-grandfather of Lady Jane Grey.

== Titles ==
Grey was the son and heir of Elizabeth Ferrers, 6th Baroness Ferrers of Groby (1419–1483) and of Sir Edward Grey (c. 1415–1457), a son of Reynold Grey, 3rd Baron Grey of Ruthin. His father was summoned to parliament as Baron Ferrers of Groby in right of his wife. After the death of Grey's father in 1457, his mother married his stepfather, John Bourchier, in 1462; he assumed his wife's title, Baron Ferrers of Groby.

As Grey predeceased his mother, Lady Ferrers, the title of Baron Ferrers of Groby passed to his eldest son and heir, Thomas. Grey was never summoned to Parliament. Another title, Baron Grey of Groby, was created 21 July 1603 for his direct descendant, Henry Grey (c.1547–1614). On the death of his father, John inherited the title of Baron Astley from his father, who inherited it from his grandfather, which his son would inherit on his death.

== Wife and children ==
About 1452, Sir John Grey married Elizabeth Woodville, the eldest daughter of Richard Woodville, 1st Baron Rivers, and Jacquetta of Luxembourg. They had two sons, Thomas, later Marquess of Dorset, born in 1455, and Richard, born in 1457.

In 1491, John's widow, by then queen dowager, became the co-heiress of her brother, Richard Woodville, 3rd Earl Rivers. She died a year later.

== Death at the battle of St Albans ==
Sir John Grey was killed in the Second Battle of St Albans in 1461, fighting for the Lancastrian cause. His widow, Lady Elizabeth Grey, later secretly married Edward IV who was the successful Yorkist claimant to the throne.

== See also ==
- Groby
- Groby Old Hall
- Groby Castle
- Bradgate House
