= Fall of George Plantagenet, Duke of Clarence =

1477–78 English legal dispute

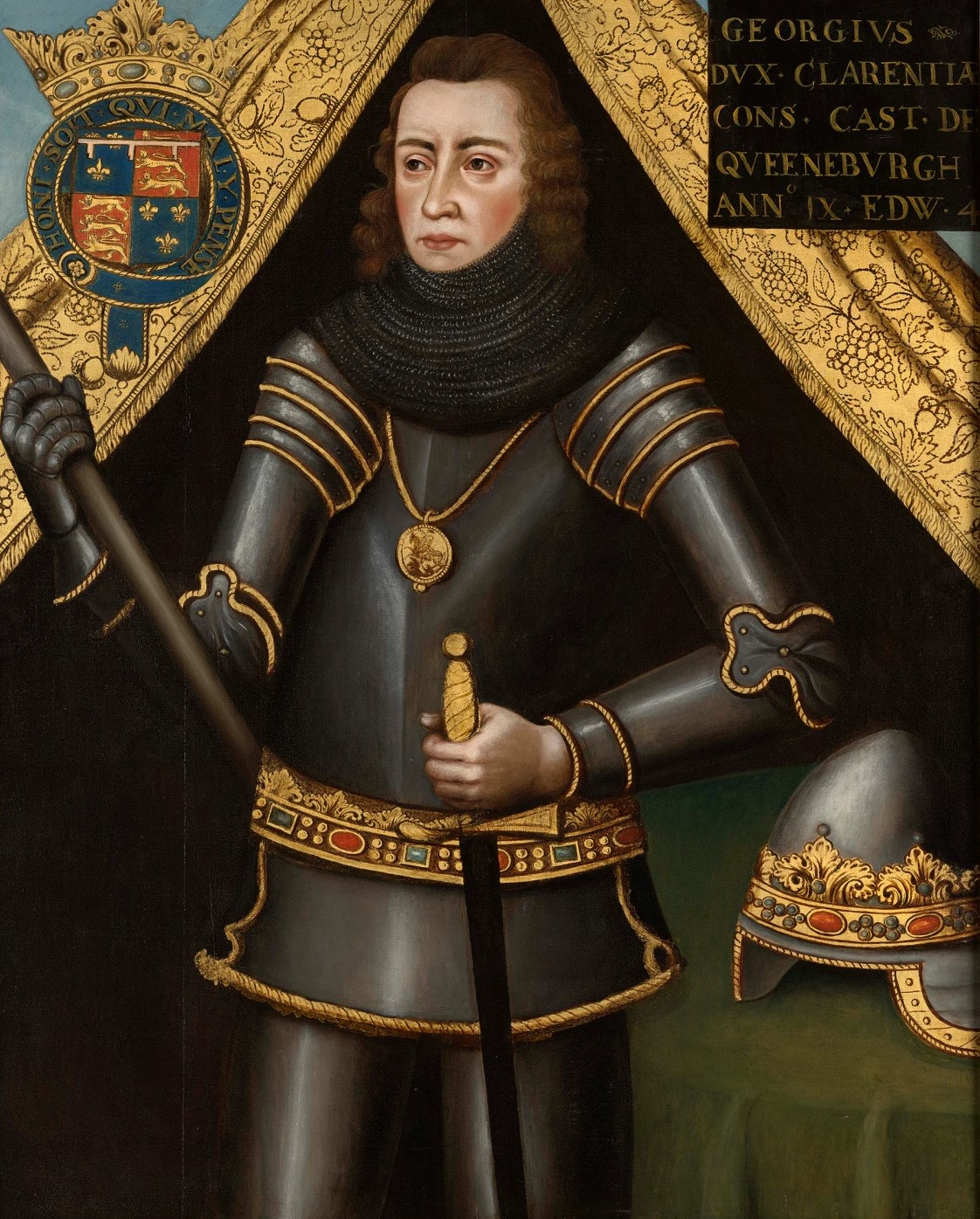
George, Duke of Clarence, brother to Kings Edward IV and Richard III

On 18 February 1478, George, Duke of Clarence, was executed in the Tower of London following his conviction for high treason in parliament. Tradition has it that he was drowned in a butt of malmsey, by order of his brother, King Edward IV. Relations between Clarence and the King had been tempestuous for several years. They had fallen out in the late 1460s when the Duke defied his brother and married Isabel, daughter of Richard, Earl of Warwick, then joined the Earl's ill-fated rebellion in 1470. Although Clarence had returned to his brother's side the following year, his authority over his Midlands and Welsh March heartlands gradually declined. For this, Edward was partially responsible, as he had liberally recruited from his brother's tenantry. The King had also promoted his in-laws—personal enemies of Clarence—often at the Duke's expense.

In December 1476, Isabel died in Tewkesbury following childbirth, as did their newly-born son a few days later. Historians have speculated that Clarence now became near deranged with grief, and that he came to imagine she had been poisoned. The following April he sent an armed force to arrest one of her ladies, Ankarette Twynho, in Frome, Somerset. A servant of Clarence's, John Thursby, was accused of poisoning the Duke and Duchess's newly-born son. Another man, Roger Tocotes, was accused of harbouring them, but evaded arrest. Twynho and Thursby were found guilty and immediately executed. The following month, in response, the King ordered an investigation into possible treason among some of Clarence's closest retainers and servants. This resulted in the execution of two of the Duke's associates, Thomas Burdet and John Stacy. Clarence publicly disputed the findings of the commission, and this, and other allegations, led to his own arrest and eventual execution.

Historians have generally considered Clarence's fall from power to have been the direct result of his abuse of his feudal authority and usurping of the King's justice. While none consider Clarence's actions as justifiable, differing motives have been presented. His original attack on Twynho, Tocotes and Thursby has been variously been put down to either petulance or a lack of mental stability. The executions, in turn, were probably a symptom of his declining authority. Haemorrhaging support as his affinity was, Clarence may have intended both a show of strength and a warning to his followers not to betray him.

== Background ==
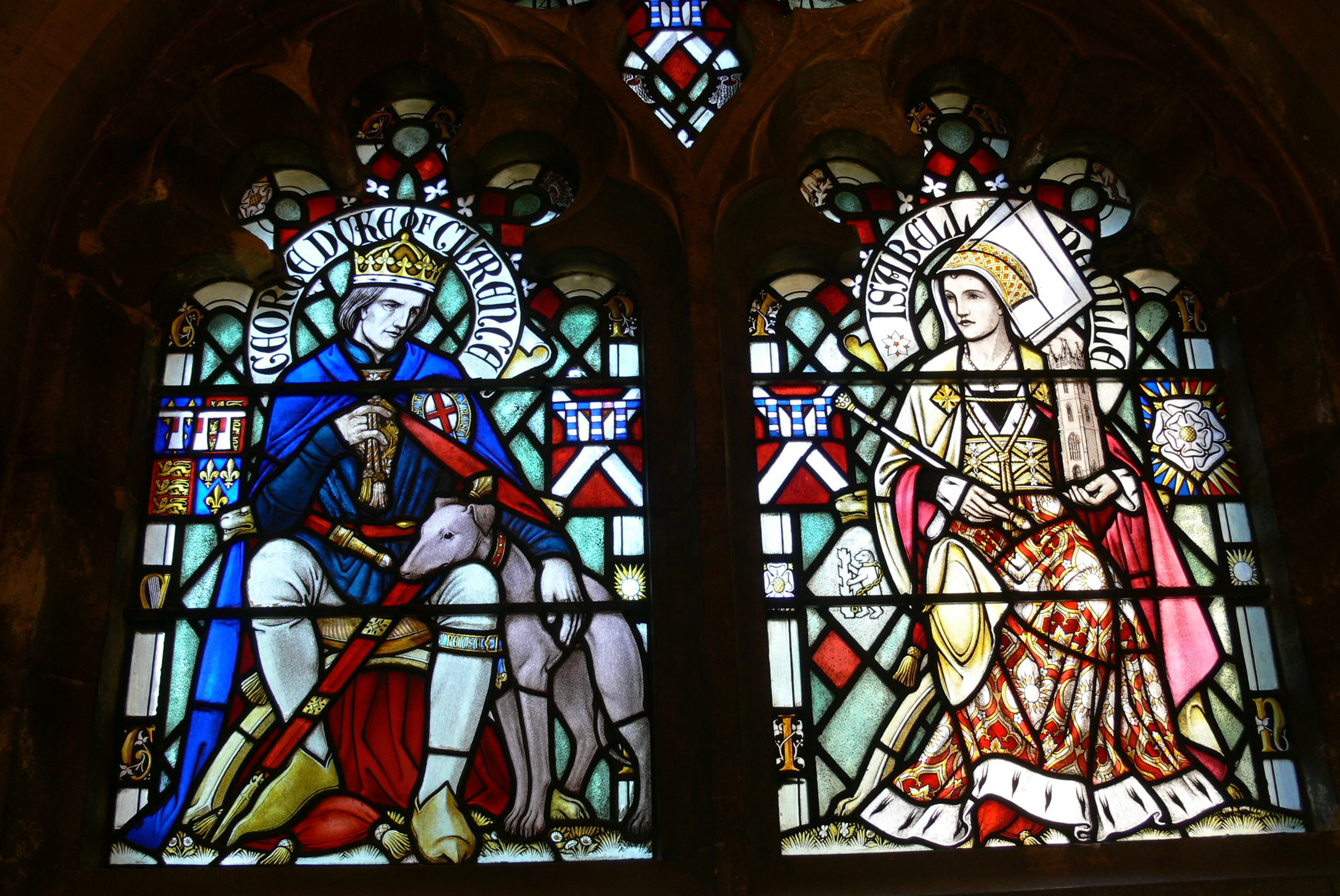
George, Duke of Clarence and his wife Isabel Neville in stained glass at Cardiff Castle.

Relations between King Edward IV of England and his brother George, Duke of Clarence, had been fraught since the late 1460s, when Clarence had drifted into the orbit of Richard Neville, Earl of Warwick, who himself had become increasingly dissatisfied with Edward's rule. Originally Warwick's protégé—the Earl had been largely responsible for Edward's accession in 1461—Edward had become increasingly independent. In 1464, he angered Warwick by marrying Elizabeth Woodville, whom the Earl saw as being from a parvenu family, and thus a marriage against the country's interests. In 1469, Warwick had rebelled; Clarence was by now his ally, as Edward had tried to prevent the Duke's marriage to Warwick's daughter Isabel. Although Clarence had returned to Edward's side in 1471, and fought with him against Warwick at the Battle of Barnet, he was no longer fully trusted.

The Midlands was the heart of Clarence's power in the 1470s. Since 1473, it had become his primary residence, and he went out of his way to recruit local families traditionally loyal to the Beauchamp earls of Warwick. Notwithstanding the Duke's efforts, his authority was slowly being eroded, mainly through the competitive recruitment of his tenants by other nobles and the King himself. The power of William, Lord Hastings—a new favourite of the King—had been gradually increased in the Midlands at the Duke's expense, who had lost the Honour of Tutbury to him. The King appears to have been dismayed at Clarence's inability to rule the region effectively and regularly intervened to buttress his brother's power in the region. His having to do so emphasised Clarence's own ineffectualness. This regional weakness was in part due to Edward's own policy of appointing castellans to Duchy of Lancaster (i.e. royal) castles surrounding the Duke's lands, encircling him with men loyal to the King rather than the Duke. Clarence was also jealous of the power of his and Edward's younger brother, Richard, Duke of Gloucester, while the Woodvilles encroached on his Marcher lands, where they were building a regional hegemony.

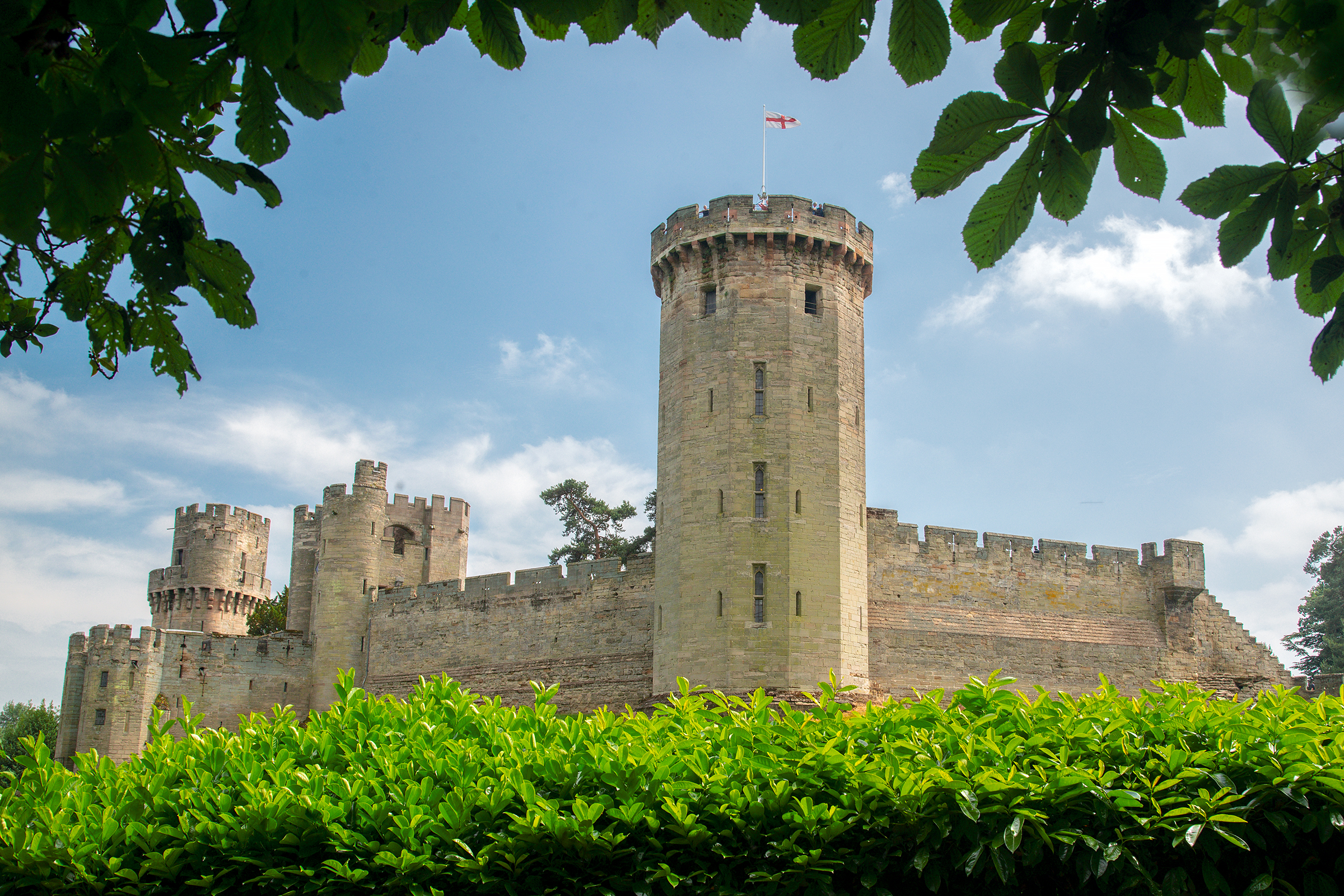
Warwick Castle, view on entering passing through the gatehouse, seen in 2018. This was Clarence's main residence in the 1470s and the centre of his power.

By the early 1470s, suggests the historian Charles Ross, the two brothers were on "thoroughly hostile terms". The Croyland Chronicle (Note: The Croyland Chronicle—occasionally Crowland Chronicle—is an important source for historians regarding events of 15th-century England. Written by several contributors, it is of unknown authorship, although the last section—dealing with the years following 1470 to the Battle of Bosworth—is suspected of being written either by a clerk close to John Russell, Bishop of Lincoln and Chancellor of England or the bishop himself, as this would account for a supposed-Fenland monk having such an intimate knowledge of high politics as the chronicle demonstrates.) reports that both parties had spies in the other's household—whom the chronicler calls "flatterers"—reporting back on the private conversations of the other and that Edward and Clarence "now each began to look upon the other with no very fraternal eyes".

== Deaths ==
Clarence and Isabel already had a son, Edward, and on 5 October 1476 in Tewkesbury Abbey, Gloucestershire, Isabel gave birth to another, whom they named Richard. Contemporary reports suggest she looked healthy in the period immediately after the birth. Clarence took her back to Warwick Castle on 12 November, but she may have become ill. Contemporaries—including the Abbey's own chronicler—believed Isabel to be suffering a postpartum illness. She died on 22 December 1476, aged 25. By then her death appears to have been expected. In a double blow, Richard died eight days later on 1 January.

Isabel was buried in Tewkesbury Abbey, accompanied by "elaborate obsequies" and a month-long lying in state, with vigils and funerary masses. Richard was buried in Warwick Castle with less fanfare. Clarence may have been suspicious that the deaths of two people close to him―possibly by poison―in such a short space of time were not a coincidence. But if so, he did not immediately act upon his suspicions, and it is possible that he had to travel to Ireland in the meantime, where he was lord lieutenant.

It is curious, suggests the medievalist John Ashdown-Hill, that the deaths of Isabel and her son occurred at such different lengths of time following their supposed ingestion of poison. According to the later charge, Isabel was poisoned on 10 October 1476, but did not die until 22 December, a period of 73 days. Their son Richard was supposed to have been poisoned on 21 December 1476 and to have died on 1 January, a period of only 11 days. Ashdown-Hill explains this by suggesting that October was actually a scribal error for December, in which case she died the day, possibly a few hours, after her son. This would also explain why Isabel was erroneously said to have been at Warwick when she was actually in Tewkesbury.

=== Arrest ===
Indictments against Ankerett Twinnewe, Roger Tocotes and John Thursby, Warwick Castle

Whereby it is found that Ankerett Twinnewe otherwise late of Warwick, widow, late servant of George Duke of Clarence and Isabella his wife, did on the 10th October, 16 Edw. 4, at Warwick, give to the said Isabella poisoned ale, of which poison she died on Sunday next before the then following Christmas. Also against Roger Tocotes, late of Warwick, Knight, servant of the said Duke and Duchess, for that on the said 10th October, he abetted the said Ankerett to commit the said felony. Also that John Thuresby, late of Warwick, yeoman, late servant of Richard Plantagenet, second son of George Duke of Clarence, compassing the death Of the said Richard, gave him on the 21st December, 16 Edw. 4, certain poisoned ale, of which poison he died on the 1st January then next ensuing. And furthermore that the said Roger Tocotes, otherwise Tokettes, late of Warwick, Knight, on the said 21st December, procured and abetted the said John Thuresby to commit the said felony. And furthermore stating that the said Ankerett Twinnere and John Thuresby, before arrival of the writ to said indictment annexed, had been attainted of the said felony.

Ankarette Twynho was seized at her house in Keyford, near Frome, on 12 April 1477; Clarence may have believed her to be a witch. The historian Michael Hicks has called the method of Twynho's arrest "highly irregular" and it has been compared to an abduction. She was taken 90 mi (140 km)—across three shires—in three days. For context, this was akin to the speed with which some of the most important political news of the previous 20 years had travelled. For example, the report of the dumping of William de la Pole, Duke of Suffolk's murdered body on the Dover shore on 2 May 1450 arrived in London on 4 May. This was a distance of approximately 70 mi (110 km), averaging 35 mi (56 km) a day. Similarly, in 1455, news of the murder of Nicholas Radford in Devon took five days to travel the 185 mi (298 km) from Exeter to London, averaging 37 mi (60 km) a day.

=== Accused parties ===
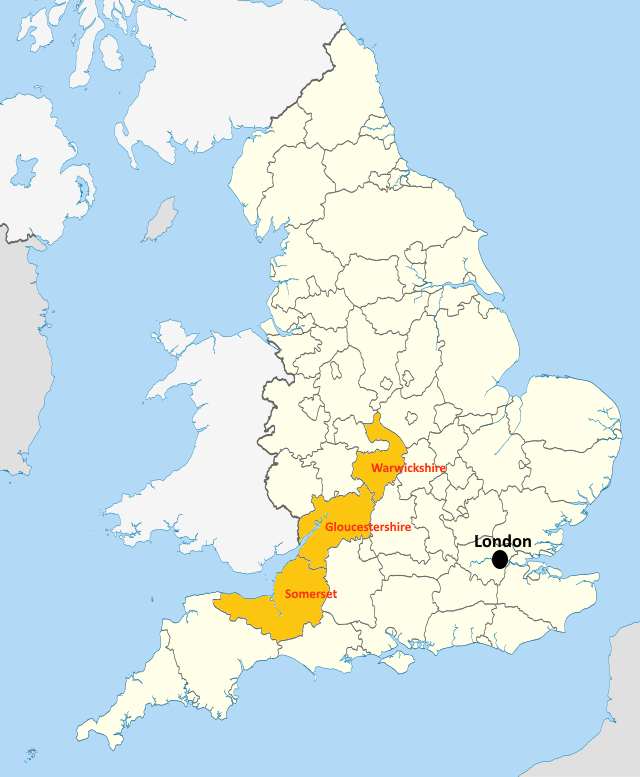
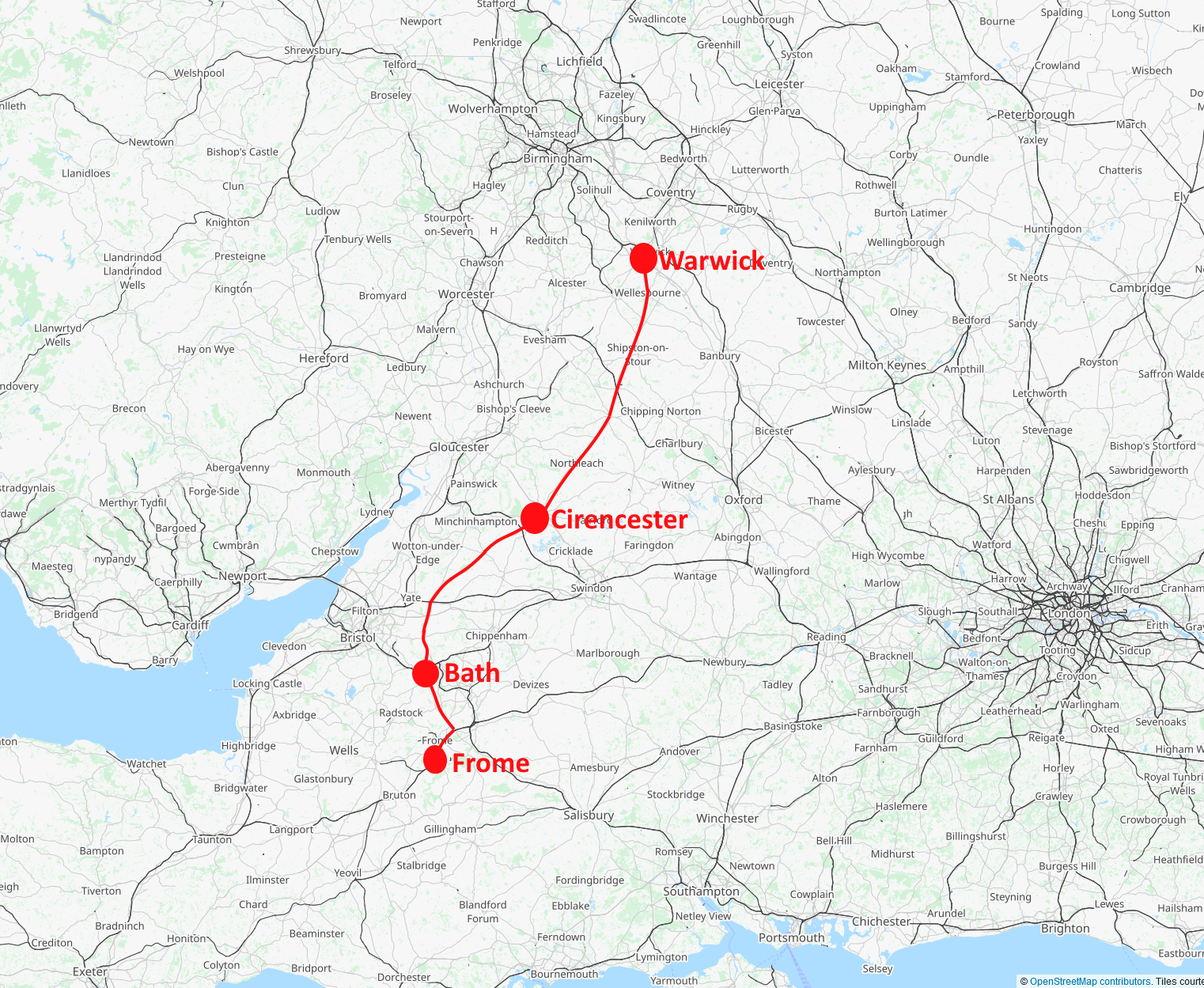

Ankarette Twynho and her husband William, who had died by 1476, were minor Somerset gentry. William had been a long-term Clarence retainer, while Twynho had been in the Duchess of Clarence's service until her death, possibly as a lady's maid. She had a role caring for Isabel after Richard's birth but seems not to have been a midwife nor involved in the birth itself. It seems unlikely that Twynho accompanied her mistress to Warwick.

Accused with Twynho was one John Thursby, a politically insignificant Warwickshire yeoman. He was charged with poisoning baby Richard, in whose service he had been. Another man, Sir Roger Tocotes, was accused by Clarence of aiding, abetting and harbouring the criminals, and possibly of orchestrating the whole plot. He managed to avoid capture. Of the three accused, Tocotes was the most important; he was brother-in-law to the influential ecclesiastic Richard Beauchamp, Bishop of Salisbury, whose executor he was to be. By 1477, he was a knight banneret and had twice been Member of Parliament for Wiltshire and sheriff.

Tocotes is known to have been in Clarence's inner circle from 1468. A close personal friend, "nobody was a more constant associate of the Duke of Clarence in adversity or prosperity", according to Michael Hicks. As such, Hicks suggests, "a more improbable object of Clarence's hostility it is difficult to imagine".

=== Trial and execution ===
Clarence forbade Twynho's daughter and son-in-law from entering Warwick, and they had to await news in Stratford-upon-Avon. Twynho was stripped of her jewels and money and imprisoned in the castle. On Tuesday 15th, with Thursby, she was tried in the guildhall. She was charged with veneficium, by giving Isabel "a venomous drink of ale mixed with poison". The killing of a master or mistress by a servant was legally petty treason; Twynho pleaded not guilty. Thursby was accused of poisoning Richard, also with bad ale. The trial was brief. The Duke was present for the proceedings, and may even have led the prosecution.

Twynho and Thursby were found guilty; there was only one penalty. Sentenced to death, they were to be "led from the bar to the said lord King's gaol of Warwick aforesaid, and drawn from that gaol through the centre of that town of Warwick to the gallows at Myton, and be hanged there on that gallows until ... dead". Before Twynho was taken from the castle for the last time, several jurors visited her in remorse. They explained how being in fear of the Duke, they came to a judgment "contrary to their conscience". The Parliament Roll later recorded that

Diverse of the same Jurre, after the said Judgment goven, came to the seid Ankarette, havyng grete remorce in their consciens, knowyng they hadde goven an untrue Verdyt in that behalf, humbly and pituously asked forgefnes thereof of the seid Ankarette...

Both Twynho and Thursby were "drawn at the horse's tail" through Warwick to their execution. This had been carried out by noon; between arraignment and death less than three hours had passed.

=== Clarence's involvement ===
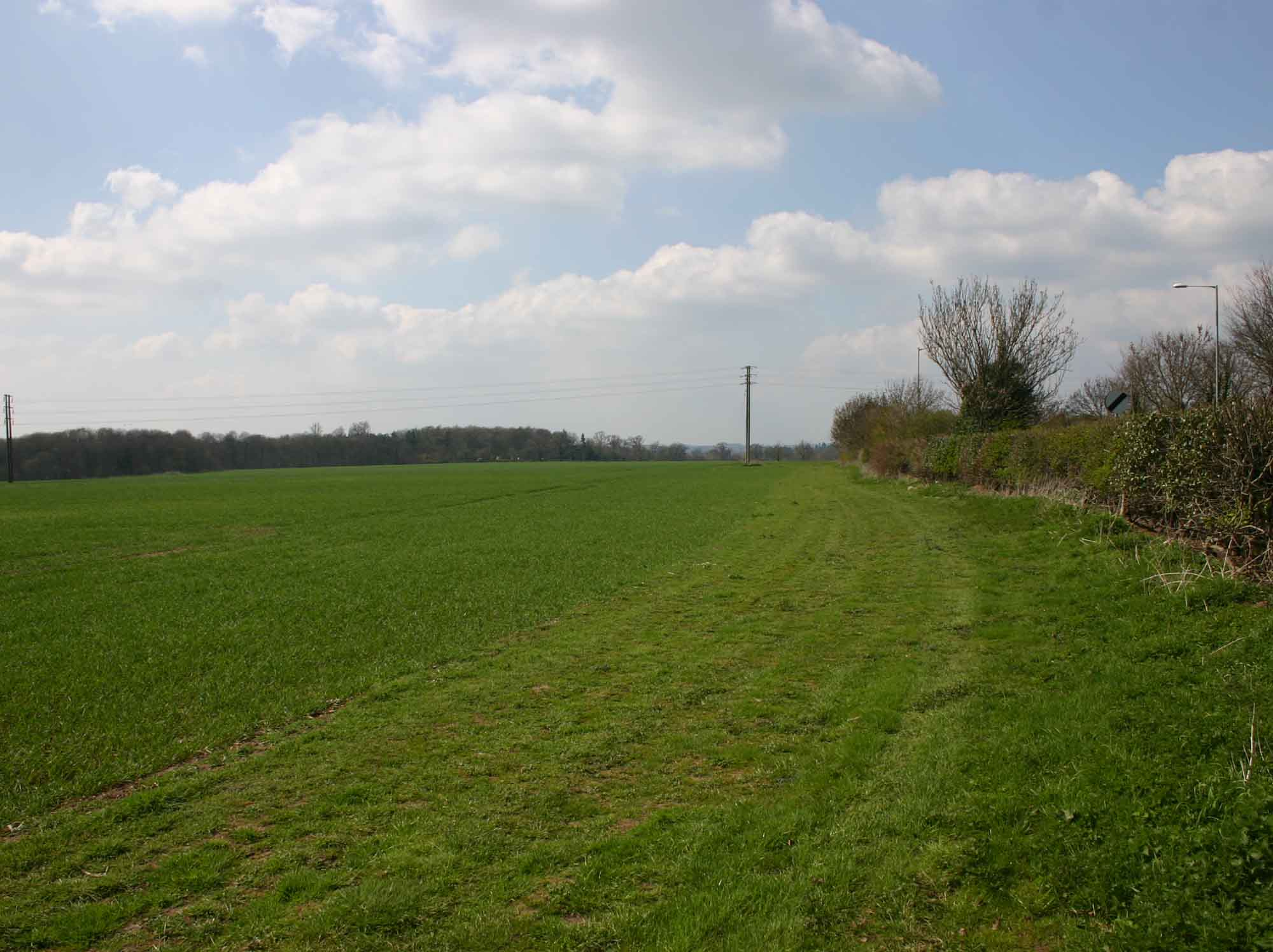
Gallows Hill, Myton, southeast of Warwick, where Twynho and Thursby were hanged, seen in 2010

As Warwick was the Duke's caput baroniae, it was unlikely that the accused would receive a fair trial. Clarence could bring influence to bear both on jurors—four of whom were his tenants from Warwick and Solihull—and on the justices. All of these were local men. Hicks argues that "undue pressure" was undoubtedly required to reach the verdicts Clarence wanted. The historian A. J. Pollard has called it a kangaroo court, with Clarence acting, a contemporary record says, "as though he had used a Kyng's power".

It is possible that the Duke deliberately altered the chronology of events, depending on whether October was a scribal error for December when the charges were read. Twynho was accused of committing the crime while she and Isabel were at Warwick Castle—thus allowing the Duke to try her there—although contemporaneous evidence indicates that the Duchess was at Tewkesbury until mid-November. To gain the verdicts he needed, Clarence probably engineered proceedings, and if he deliberately changed December to October in the charges, then he also fabricated evidence. Further, all the responsible officials were his men. These included not only the county clerk, but also the justices of the bench, John Hugford and Henry Boteler. The latter were the Duke's current and former retainers respectively. On these grounds, suggests the historian Christine Carpenter, the indictments were most improper.

Addressing the possibility that Clarence's suspicions were correct, Hicks considers it unlikely that Isabel was poisoned at all because it took so long for her to die: there were no contemporary poisons capable of producing such a protracted death. He suggests that the Duke was guilty of embracery at the least, and Twynho's original arrest and detention was probably illegal also since the royal commission later referred to "the unlawful taking of Ankarette through three shires". On the other hand, the speed with which proceedings had been conducted—and the swiftness to execution—"about which the petitioner also complained might have been unfair, but it was not illegal", says the legal scholar John Bellamy. Even the charge of embracery is not watertight; as a member of the Warwickshire bench, recommending a verdict to a jury was within the Duke's remit.

== Later events ==
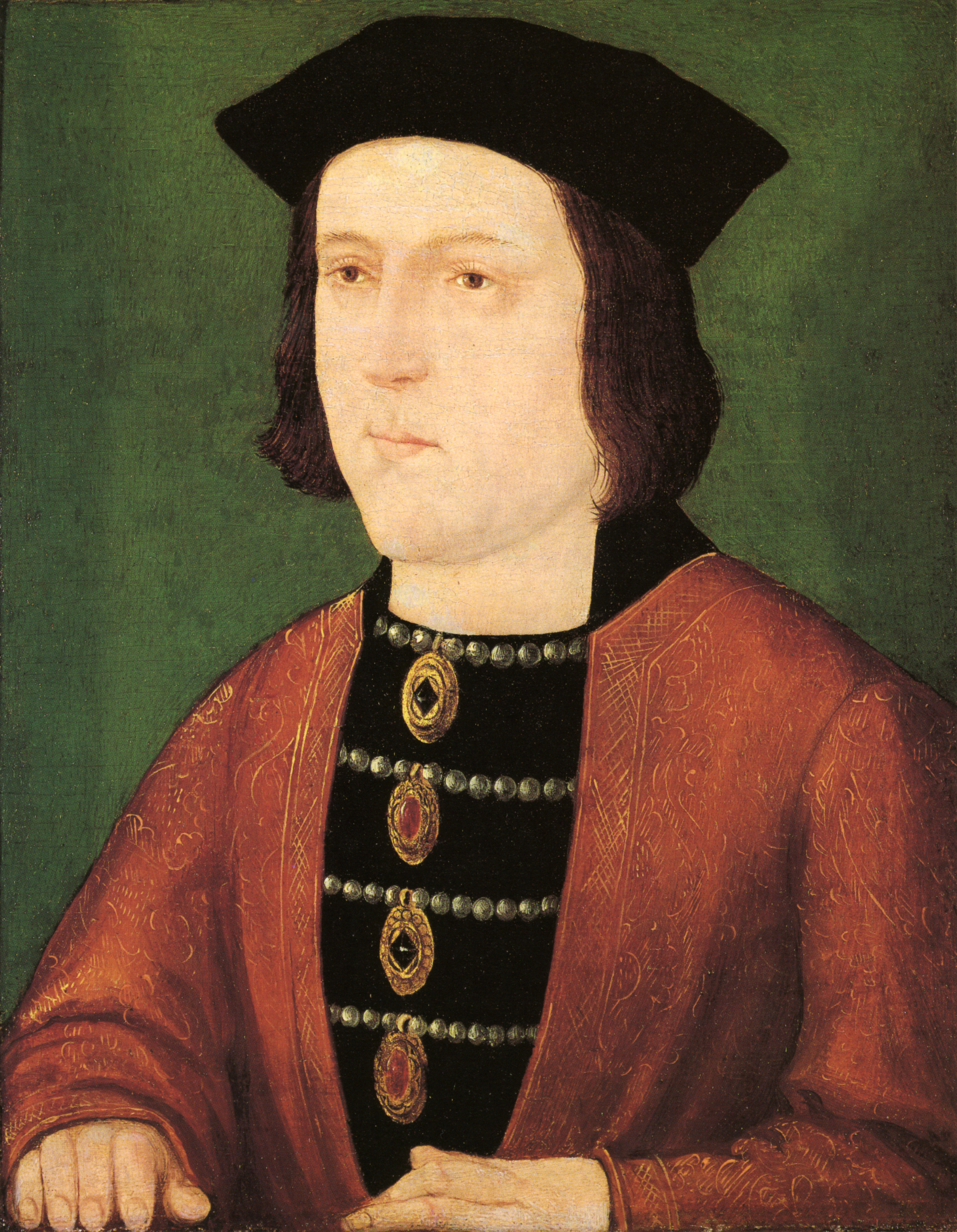
King Edward IV, oil painting by an unknown artist, c. 1540

=== Stacy and Burdet ===
In what the scholar Cora Scofield calls "revenge ... in a manner scarcely less extraordinary" than the Duke's own, and what may have been a subtle warning to Clarence, the King instructed a commission of 17 lay magnates to investigate the judicial proceedings. Investigation swiftly led to an Oxford University clerk called John Stacy, a prominent alchemist, alleged astrologer and magnus necromanticus, or great sorcerer. Contemporaries suspected him of practising the dark arts, and it was known he had predicted the death of William de la Pole, Duke of Suffolk. Stacy—under acerrimum examen, literally, "severe examination" (i.e. torture)—in turn implicated Thomas Burdet of Arowe, a member of Clarence's household. Burdet had supposedly turned against the King after he had hunted in Burdet's park and killed his favourite white buck. Following Stacy's confession, Burdet and another Oxford clerk, Thomas Blake, were arrested. The commission condemned all three. In what Ross has called a "staged political trial", they were found guilty of "calculat[ing] by art magic, astronomy, and necromancy" the fates of the King and his heir, and thereby "'imagining and compassing' the King's death" with incantations over a three-year period. This was high treason. Blake was reprieved after a petition from the Bishop of Norwich, but Burdet and Stacy, still protesting their innocence, were taken to Tyburn the following day and hanged, drawn and quartered. The same day—and although two of the parties were by now dead—a writ of certiorari was dispatched to the sheriff of Warwick, transferring the Twynho-Thursby-Tocotes case to the King's Bench in Westminster. On learning of this writ—which removed the danger of his arrest by the Duke—Sir Roger Tocotes surrendered himself to the Marshalsea Prison; he was later acquitted of complicity in the death of the Duchess.

Clarence proclaimed Burdet innocent. Accompanied by the Minorite preacher Dr John Goddard, the Duke interrupted a royal council meeting while the King was in Windsor. Goddard read out Burdet's gallows statement. When Edward heard, reports Croyland, "he was greatly displeased and recalled information laid against his brother which he had long kept in his breast". An appeal to the King's council, however impromptu, was within the boundaries of acceptable political protest, particularly for a leading magnate. It was, though, unwise; in voicing his belief so publicly, Clarence associated himself with Burdet's treason. It was also near-treasonable to criticise the findings of a royal commission as this could be interpreted as a denunciation of royal justice, which to contemporaries was an extension of divine justice. Clarence's choice of spokesman was also unfortunate. Goddard was the priest who had publicly, and vehemently, advocated Henry VI's return to the throne in April 1470 at St Paul's Cathedral, after Edward had been forced into exile by Warwick and Clarence. Compounding his appearance of guilt, Clarence may have also been circulating rumours of the King's illegitimacy—rumours originally promulgated by him and Warwick in the late 1460s. This was also treason, as it implicitly alleged the illegitimacy of Edward's heir, thus endangering the succession. (Note: Specifically, that Edward was the son of an archer from Calais named Blaybourne, with whom the Duchess of York supposedly had an affair while her husband was Lord Lieutenant of France in 1441. Accusations of illegitimacy were among the most potent that could be made in 15th-century England; it was also one of the most frequent. Before Edward IV, Henry VI's son Edward, Prince of Wales, faced the same charge, and so did Henry Tudor after Edward. Edward's sons, Edward V and Richard of York, were also accused. The allegations against Edward were to be revived by his brother Gloucester in 1483 as part of his campaign to usurp the throne.)

=== Proposed marriages ===
Clarence felt that he had multiple legitimate reasons for unrest. Following his wife's death, he proposed that he should marry Duchess Mary of Burgundy. This proposal failed to gain the King's support, who prohibited the match; Croyland reports that "such an exalted destiny for an ungrateful brother was not to the liking of the King". Worse for Clarence, Edward proposed that their brother-in-law Earl Rivers marry Mary instead. (Note: Ross points out that Clarence marrying into the House of Burgundy would make him one of the most powerful men in Europe, and with a legitimate claim to the English throne, undoubtedly strong enough to attempt another overthrow of Edward. Rivers was not viewed abroad as a bona fide member of the royal family, and the French chronicler Philippe de Commines calls him "a mere earl".) While this match was never likely to come to fruition—Mary was already engaged to Maximilian, son of the Holy Roman Emperor—it furthered the Duke's discontent: Rivers was a Woodville, and to Clarence the whole family was an enemy. Worse, Edward also vetoed King James III of Scotland's suggestion—of which Clarence approved—that the Duke should marry James's sister Margaret. Hicks notes that, at this point, Clarence might justifiably have recalled how Edward had tried to prevent his first marriage too. The Duke at this point had done nothing new wrong: "the animosity was on the King's side".

== Clarence's arrest and fall ==
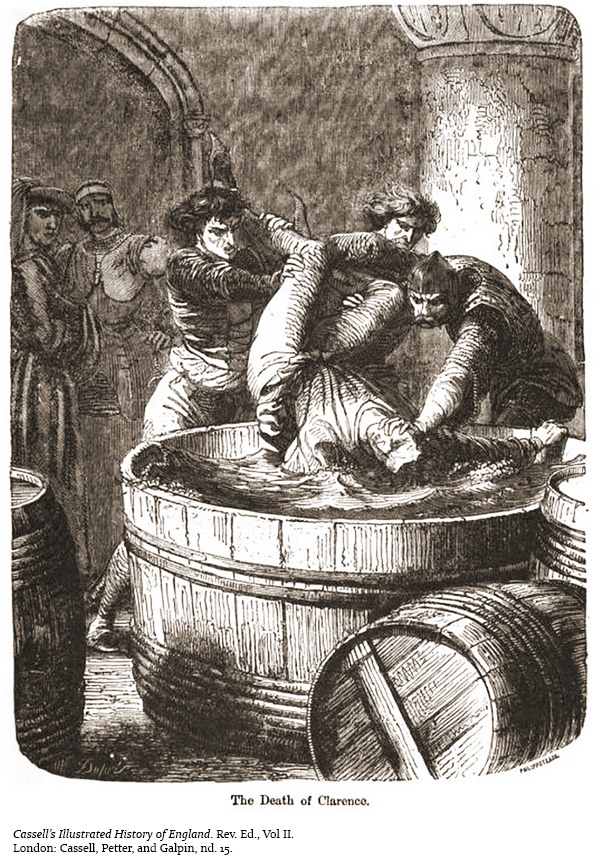
Drowning of the Duke of Clarence (1858 illustration)

In late June 1477, Clarence was arrested and imprisoned in the Tower of London on charges of usurping royal authority, or "violating the laws of the realm by threatening the safety of judges and jurors", states Bellamy. He remained in custody until parliament met in January 1478. Except for some minor business, this parliament—to which a large number of both royal and Woodville clients had got themselves elected—had been called expressly to attaint him of high treason. The trial and executions of Twynho and Thursby did not form part of the prosecution case, although during the course of the parliament, Roger Twynho successfully petitioned that the proceedings and verdict against his grandmother should be overturned. He was probably aided by several MPs connected to the case, who included John and William Twynho—sitting for Gloucester and Dorset respectively—and Robert Tocotes, Sir Roger's brother. Tocotes's brother-in-law, the bishop of Salisbury, was also sitting as a Lord spiritual.

The petition was politically opportune, as the King was unlikely to ignore an opportunity to discredit his brother further. Croyland reports how the parliament became a battle of wills between the brothers: "no one spoke against the Duke but the King, and no one answered but the Duke". Clarence, in desperation, offered to submit to trial by combat; his request was ignored. On top of the charges of spreading slander and usurping royal authority were further accusations. Clarence was alleged to have encouraged Edward's subjects to withdraw their allegiance from him. Clarence was also supposed to have claimed that the King poisoned his subjects—and had intended to poison the Duke—through necromancy. Clarence was accused of planning violent resistance to the King, ordering his men to be ready to fight at an hour's warning. He was also judged guilty himself of sorcery, and of scheming to usurp Edward's throne. Found guilty, Clarence was sentenced to death.

Although the King hesitated for several days, the sentence was carried out in a private execution within the Tower on 18 February 1478. Tradition has it, immortalised by Shakespeare in Richard III, (Note: The First Murderer refers to it twice in front of the Duke: "throw him into the malmsey butt in the next room", and "I'll drown you in the malmsey butt within".) that the Duke was drowned in a butt of malmsey, a sweet wine from Greece.

Although Clarence had procured the execution of Ankarette, John Twynho of Bristol seems to have remembered the Duke sympathetically despite the death of his kinswoman. In his will, proven in 1485, he left a silver cup to the Abbess of Shaftesbury inscribed venerabilis dux Clarencie ex sua benevolencia michi dedit ("given me by the Duke of Clarence in his benevolence").

== Historiography ==
Although a local affair, the Twynho case has attracted commentary from modern political and social historians. The folklorist George Kittredge called it a cause célèbre, while more recently Carpenter has described it and the subsequent arrests and execution of Burdet and Stacy as being of "considerable significance" at the time. To Hicks, Twynho's execution was judicial murder, and "one of the most flagrant abuses of noble power in late medieval England", and a blatant example of how an overmighty subject could abuse his position. Ross called it a "scandalous demonstration" of the misuse of magnate authority, while Rosemary Horrox cites Clarence's over-awing of the jury as a "classic symptom of bastard feudalism".

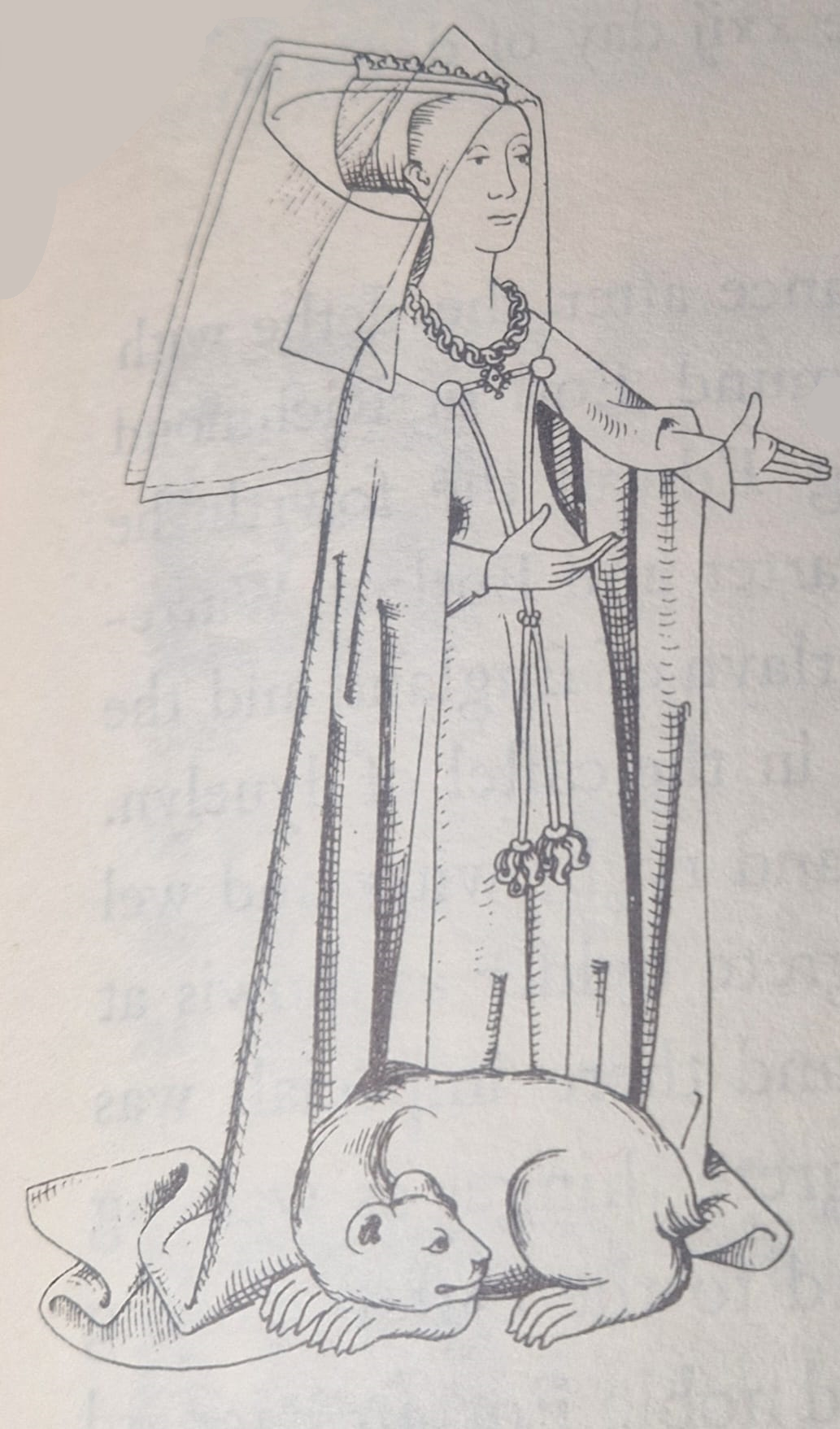
Drawing of Isabel, Duchess of Clarence from the Rous Roll, c. 1483

Clarence's degree of personal responsibility has also been discussed. Professor J. R. Lander found the charges against Twynho and Thursby too implausible to credit, calling them "fantastic". He blames Clarence's actions as the result of a "seriously disturbed mind". However, Hicks criticises this as "too facile a solution", as it effectively absolves Clarence of mens rea. He also argues that there is a contradiction, if Clarence was both sufficiently disturbed to believe in Twynho's guilt but sensible enough to recognise the weaknesses in the case and to stage-manage evidence. Conversely, David Hipshon considers Clarence to have been merely petulant (albeit to an "alarming degree").

Fleming also sees an interplay between the Twynho affair and national politics, although he considers the precise connection unclear. That previously loyal household servants such as Twynho and Thursby, and intimates as Tocotes, no longer felt the Duke's service provided security or the prospect of promotion is apparent. Members of Clarence's affinity were wavering in their loyalties; Carpenter comments that "even in this bastion of Warwick [Clarence's] power began to fall apart". It was alleged, for example, that he planned to send his son and heir, Edward, abroad to drum up support for his cause. His long-time servants John Harewood and John Tapton were supposedly to find a child, 'in likeness' of the Duke's own, and place him in Warwick Castle, and Edward taken to Ireland, Flanders or Burgundy. That Clarence could no longer rely on his word being faithfully obeyed is indicated by Harewood and Tapton's subsequent behaviour. Far from doing as the Duke requested, they immediately revealed his plans to the King. (Note: The Duchess of York had sent George and Richard to Burgundy in January 1461 for their protection following the death of her husband at the Battle of Wakefield the previous December. Then, it was a place of safety; in 1477, it was leaderless after the death of its duke, Charles the Bold, at the Battle of Nancy in January, and experiencing civil war and under threat of invasion from France. This makes it unlikely that Clarence would have considered sending his heir there.) Ashdown-Hill has proposed an innocent explanation for Clarence to do so: that following the deaths of his wife and baby in quick succession, he was not only suspicious but also fearful of further deaths, and particularly the well-being of his two-year-old heir. Further indicating the loss of cohesion in Clarence's power base, Burdet—a personal squire—was himself betrayed by another Clarence retainer and "constant associate", Alexander Rushton, who had also been approached by Burdet and Stacy.

Even before their arrests, relations between Clarence and King had been under strain. Afterwards, it must have been clear that Clarence's fortunes were liable to break sooner rather than later. From the King's point of view, Clarence was proving to be completely ineffectual as a mighty lord in his own lands; now he had suborned royal justice and forced Edward's local royal officials to obey him rather than their King. This was despite Edward's having made law and order the centrepiece of his return to power in 1471.

Compared to Clarence, the Woodville family, headed by Queen Elizabeth, had grown powerful, and with the royal children growing up, their households were also increasing. For example, John Twynho, the Bristol recorder, joined the household of the Prince of Wales. Ankarette Twynho was unemployed after Isabel's death and would have presumably accepted employment with any lord or lady, while Tocotes had become Master of Game for the Queen. Hicks suggests that the possible disintegration of his affinity at the hands of his brother and in-laws was sufficient to drive Clarence to seek revenge; it also demonstrated "a talent for swift and ruthless action" in him. Carpenter agrees that the weakening of Clarence's authority in the Midlands was central to Clarence's response. He may have thought a dramatic demonstration of his power in his heartland would stop the bleeding of retainers to Hastings and Woodville. But, she comments, "if this was his purpose, the gesture was meaningless":

All Clarence had succeeded in showing was that by the use of military force near the heart of his domain he could overawe some of the middling gentry ... where, if he had been a real force, his word would normally have been law.

Hicks speculates that Clarence wanted to show he was not to be "trifled with", but in fact, by doing so, he helped prepare the way for his own downfall. Bellamy has argued that Clarence's wielding of the legal machinery for personal motives only caused the subsequent outcry it did because he was out of royal favour and with waning prospects. Clarence may have intended Twynho's execution as a lesson not just to the community at large but also a warning to his retainers on the penalties of betrayal. Bellamy also doubts whether there was any basis for the Duke's suspicions. By 1477, his behaviour was "quite irresponsible, even unbalanced". This included public insults to the King, such as ostentatiously dropping unicorn horn into his cup at a 1477 royal banquet, thus suggesting to observers that he was reluctant to trust the King. Carpenter also suggests that Clarence could quite possibly have become deranged, possibly delusional following the loss of his wife; there seems no doubt that his grief was genuine. Lander considers that Clarence's self-control—"never very strong"—completely collapsed. David Cook suggests that Clarence was motivated by "greed and resentment", while Hazel Pierce notes that Twynho could have been one of the so-called "flatterers" who reported Clarence's private statements to the King, if not directly, then possibly via men such as Tocotes. On this phenomenon, Croyland comments how

You might then have seen (as such men are generally to be found in the courts of all princes), flatterers running to and fro, from the one side to the other, and carrying backwards and forwards the words which had fallen from the two brothers, even if they had happened to be spoken in the most secret closet.
