= Butt of malmsey =

Wooden cask for transporting malmsey wine

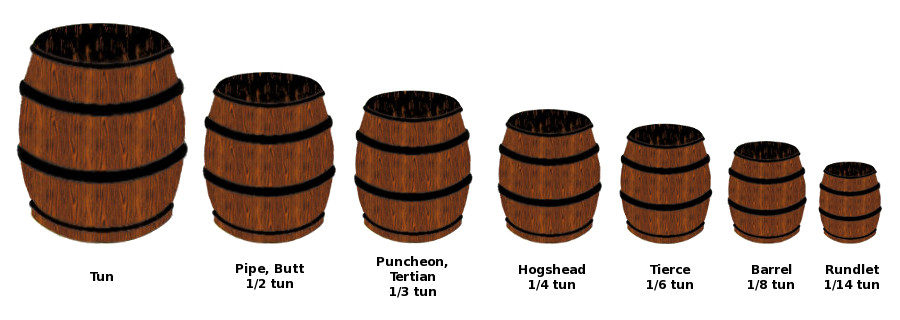
Illustration of the wine butt in comparison to other cask units

A butt of malmsey was a measuring unit in Medieval England for the transport of malmsey wine. First recorded in Geoffrey Chaucer's The Canterbury Tales in the late 14th century, it was a vessel of varying size until it was standardised in the next century, when it was approximately 4 feet (1.2 m) wide, holding 126 wine gallons (477 liters). Designed to transport and dispense large quantities at a time, it became an item of luxury trade, with political weight, and as a result was also used in both gift-giving by the nobility and as a unit of exchange; it could also be combined with other wines. Malmsey itself was particularly popular in Northern Europe as having a higher sugar level meant that it was much stronger in alcohol than native wines; it could also withstand longer sea voyages than many other wines. The import of malmsey butts, particularly by London merchants, provided tax for national defence and on one occasion led to a trade war with Venice, its major importer.

The butt of malmsey is probably popularly most well known as the alleged method used to execute George, Duke of Clarence—brother to King Edward IV—in the Tower of London in 1478, following the Duke's conviction for treason. Immortalised by William Shakespeare in Richard III, where the Duke is stabbed and then drowned in a butt of malmsey, the story is regarded by most modern scholars as apocryphal. Due to its rarity—such a method is not known to have been used before or since—doubt has been cast on its efficacy or the practicality of drowning in such a manner as a method of execution, although it has persisted in popular culture. Several writers and commentators have referenced it since, ranging from Shakespeare and Thomas Heywood in the 16th century, Gervase Markham in the 17th, Mikhail Lermontov, Herman Melville and Charles Dickens in the 19th, and Raymond Chandler and Daniel Curzon in the 20th.

== Butt of malmsey ==
The butt (from the medieval French botte) was the old French for "pipe", which became a synonymous English term; in 1504, for example, at the enthronement of Archbishop Warham, both a pipe of osay—or Auxois and a butt of malmsey were among the "enormous quantity of drink served". As a unit of volume, it was legally standardised in the 15th century at 126 wine gallons (477 litres). By the 17th century, the butt's quantity fluctuated, ranging from 126 imperial gallons (570 litres) to 140 imperial gallons (640 litres). The name stems from the elongated, pipe-like coopered casks used for large volume wine storage. its importation was generally the preserve of London merchants. It was taxed for defence, and was also given as an expensive gift. For example, in the 14th century, Richard II enacted that for every butt of malmsey imported, ten bow staves were to be provided for city defence, and the City of Hereford ordained similarly a century later regarding that merchants bringing malmsey from Venice should do likewise. In 1513, Henry VIII sent the London Dominican prior a butt of malmsey in recognition of the cordial relations then existing between the crown and the order. The Elizabethan courtier, Richard Southwell likewise sent them a butt, indicating the importance in which he held them. As an expensive luxury, the import of malmsey butts could have political implications. In the 1490s, a "brisk tariff war" existed between England and Venice due to the latter city imposing an extra four ducats on every butt exported to England by English merchants; in response, Henry VII imposed an import duty on Venetian malmsey butts of £4 each; this tax lasted until 1512. By 1527 one butt of malmsey cost around £4, equivalent to $3,000 in 2023; in 1566 a butt was estimated at around £3 6s 8d.

The word malmsey is a corruption of Malvasia, and was often used as a generic term for any sweet, richly-bodied Greek wine, particularly from Crete. Being so much sweeter than north European wines made them concomitantly higher in alcohol content and as such they were favoured all the more in those countries. The increase in trade between England and Venice in the 15th century led to a growth in malmsey's popularity among the wealthy, and it was considered an extravagant gift. By the 15th century, Crete alone exported 200,000 butts of the wine a year. Part of its popularity lay in the fact that it could withstand long sea voyages without deteriorating. In the 17th century, the writer and antiquarian Gervase Markham called for a butt of malmsey—which he says is "also called ralt-row"—in his recipe for a flavoured muscadine. The term malmsey eventually shifted from being a generic term to specifically referring to the sweetest type of Madeira wine. During the same period, a butt of malmsey was required to make "Tyre that is excellent", as part of a mixture of "fat Bastard, two gallons of Cute [and] Parrel".

== Historicity ==
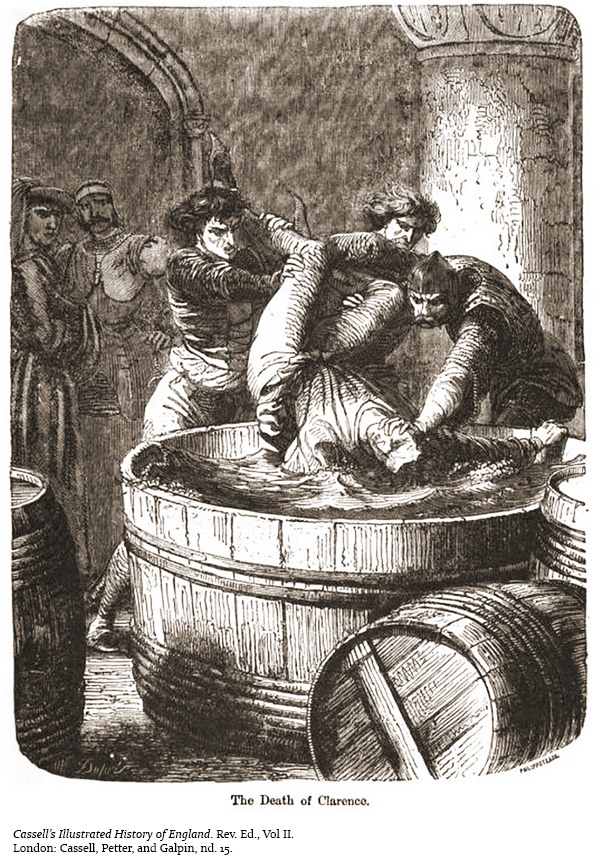
19th-century illustration of Clarence's execution

Relations between King Edward IV and his brother George, Duke of Clarence, had been fraught ever since the late 1460s. Edward had tried to prevent the Duke's first marriage, to Isabel, daughter of Richard Neville, Earl of Warwick in 1469. Although Clarence had returned to Edward's side in 1471, he was no longer fully trusted. Clarence felt that he had multiple legitimate reasons for unrest. Following his wife's death, he proposed that he should marry again, this time to Duchess Mary of Burgundy. Edward again refused to allow it, and prohibited the match; the two brothers were, by now, on "thoroughly hostile terms".

In 1477, Clarence was arrested on charges of spreading slander and usurping royal authority; the following year he was put on trial and attainted. Found guilty, he was sentenced to death. Legend has it that he was drowned in a butt of malmsey, but the veracity of the story has never been proven or disproven, and it is unknown whether, if it happened, it was deliberate or accidental.

=== Contemporary allusions ===
This was such an unusual mode of execution in medieval England that it is not known to have been used on any other occasion. Yet it is reported by the earliest commentators, such as Dominic Mancini who stated that it was adjudged "that [Clarence] should die by being plunged in a jar of sweet wine", and the contemporary Croyland Chronicle, although more noncommittal, like other contemporary writers never suggested any other death. No official statement has ever been uncovered.

Hicks concludes that the method was "extraordinary", and questions whether it may have been Clarence's own choice. The 19th-century historical writer Agnes Strickland suggested that it could have been accidental—that he fell into the barrel—on the grounds that Clarence was known to be particularly fond of malmsey, and that he was in the habit of drinking it to excess. Likewise, George Edwin Roberts considered that the Duke may well have chosen "drowning his cares in wine as well as his body" In 1857, an anonymous writer for The Living Age argued that the method was intrinsically unlikely. Firstly, the physical butt itself was probably not big enough (in England being "seldom larger ... than four feet in length"), and secondly it is implied that the top of the butt must have been removed, though there would normally be no reason to do this. While it was common practice in wine producing countries to let wine breathe during production in this manner, there was no reason to do so in England. John Spargo has noted that although unusual in England, drowning in a vessel was less so on the continent, particularly for Anabaptist heresy. He also points out that a close reading of Shakespeare's text need not suggest that the butt actually contained malmsey; like the execution vessels used abroad, it may well have been water. Further, he argues that Edward IV would have been aware of this method of execution from his time in Burgundian exile, as well as the fact that in several real-life cases, drowning was preceded by stabbing.

== In literature ==
In the 14th-century poem "Land of Cockayne", a character is condemned to death by drowning in a butt of malmsey; the author devotes "16 lines of doggerel" to it. A near-contemporary French manuscript contains a poem referencing Clarence's death. Titled La Légende de Maitre Pierre Faiferi, it also reflects the malmsey hypothesis in the 15th century consciousness.

I have seen the Duke of Clarence
(So his wayward fate had will'd),
By his special order, drown 'd
In a cask with Malmsey fill' d.
That that death should strike his fancy,
This the reason, I suppose;
He might think that hearty drinking
Would appease his dying throes.

In the late 14th century, the poet Geoffrey Chaucer used a butt of malmsey in his fabliau, The Shipman's Tale to satirise excessive drinking among merchants and religieuse. In Shakespeare's Richard III, the First Murderer refers to it twice in front of the Duke: "throw him into the malmsey butt in the next room", and "I'll drown you in the malmsey butt within". The Second Murderer concurs, calling the butt an "excellent device" with which to "make a sop of him". Shakespeare took most of the material for his history plays from Holinshed and Hall, and where he found the butt of malmsey tale. However, notes Spargo, Shakespeare adds one particular detail to his scene: the stage direction "Stabs him" precedes the First Murderer's second comment. Shakespeare appears to have added this on his own suggestion, as it appears in the First Folio. Further, the Second Murderer leaves, per the stage direction, "with the body", implying that Clarence is at least no longer in the butt, and suggesting that he may never have been.

The affair is also referred to in the late-Elizabethan play, Edward IV, attributed to Thomas Heywood. (Note: The play's authorship is unknown, although ascribed by E. K. Chambers and Richard Rowland to Heywood, possibly with collaborators.) Dr Shaw, hurrying to the Tower to shrive Clarence, meets Francis, Lord Lovell coming from the same place; Lovell, a close associate of Clarence and Edward's brother Richard, Duke of Gloucester, informs Shaw that he saw Clarence dead, "of a fly's death, drowned in a butt of malmsey". Shaw queries whether it could have been suicide; Lovell disabuses him saying "he had some helpers ... with the Duke of Gloucester's".

The Russian author Mikhail Lermontov, discussing the drinking habits of Georgians in his 1831 monograph A Hero of Our Time, recalls a local tradition of burying jars of wine in maranas, or large jars. Lermontov tells how a Russian dragoon, having discovered one and broken it open, "fell into it and drowned in Kakheti wine, like poor Clarence in his butt of Malmsey". The literary commentator John Webster Spargo considers it curious that Shakespeare's murderers, having passed a malmsey butt next door, "should have determined upon this novel form of execution" as opposed to, for example, by stabbing, "no Shakespearean editor or commentator has explained". The Shakespearean scholar Karen Raber has also highlighted being stabbed and then drowned as an exceptional method of execution, noting that beheading was the usual fate of treacherous nobility.

Charles Dickens, in his A Child's History of England, wrote that Clarence's death was at the hands of Edward, Richards, or both, and that "he was told to choose the manner of his death, and that he chose to be drowned in a butt of malmsey". Dickens believed this to be a fitting end "for such a miserable creature". Another Victorian writer, Alfred O. Legge, dismissed the butt of malmsey theory as a fiction, arguing it "was probably a picturesque accretion attributable to the vinose [sic] propensities" of its original imaginer, and that, if it had a historical basis, it might have stemmed from a "belief that poison was conveyed to Clarence in a glass of his favourite beverage".

In modern literature, the detective novelist Raymond Chandler referenced Clarence and the butt of malmsey in his 1940 Farewell, My Lovely. The character Dr Sonderborg—having been poisoned—exclaims,

But me no buts. I'll make a sop of you. I'll drown you in a butt of Malmsey wine. I wish I had a butt of Malmsey wine myself to drown in. Shakespeare. He knew his liquor too. Let's have a little of our medicine ... Get on with it, Karloff.

Daniel Curzon's 2007 play Enter the princess satirises the size of a character's ears, with Prin commenting to the Queen, "Those ears. Surely someone could be persuaded to pick him up by those and hold him for a time in a butt of Malmsey."
