= Roger Tocotes =

15th-century English retainer

Sir Roger Tocotes (fl. 1460s – c. 1470s) was a member of the Warwickshire gentry in late 15th-century England. Originally a retainer of George, Duke of Clarence, he was accused by the Duke of poisoning Isabel, Duchess of Clarence. His co-accused, Ankarette Twynho, was hanged outside Warwick in April 1477, but Tocotes managed to evade capture until the Duke himself had been arrested. Tocotes transferred his service to Elizabeth Woodville, serving as her Master of Game.

== Background ==
Tocotes' parents were James and Elizabeth of Tocketts, North Yorkshire near Guisborough. Tocotes is recorded in a 1457 roll as an "esquire, of Bromham".

== Career ==
Tocotes is known to have been in Clarence's inner circle from 1468; "nobody was a more constant associate of the Duke of Clarence in adversity or prosperity", comments the historian Michael Hicks. His elections to parliament had been as the Duke's candidate, he had been in Clarence's army when he defected to Edward before Barnet in 1471, had travelled with him in the same capacity to France in 1475, and had been a ducal councillor ever since. Further, he appears to have been a close personal friend. As such, suggests Hicks, "a more improbable object of Clarence's hostility it is difficult to imagine".

However, in December 1476 Clarence's wife, Isabel Neville, Duchess of Clarence, died, probably from complications following childbirth. By April the following year, Clarence appears to have convinced himself that Isabel had been poisoned. He arrested Twynho, who had been one of her ladies, and one other, and intended to arrest Tocotes for masterminding the plot. Sir Roger Tocotes was also accused by Clarence of aiding, abetting and harbouring the criminals, although he managed to avoid capture. Clarence seems to have considered him the guiding hand behind the operation, with Twynho and Thursby his agents. Of the three accused, Tocotes was the most important. Unlike the Twynhos, he was a member of the leading county gentry. His wife, Elizabeth Braybrooke of St Amand, was the sister-in-law of the bishop of Salisbury, Richard Beauchamp, (Note: Beauchamp was an influential ecclesiastic, the first chancellor of the Order of the Garter, and personal associate of King Henry VI at the outbreak of civil war in the late 1450s.) whose executor he was to be. By 1477, Tocotes was a knight banneret and had twice been Member of Parliament for Wiltshire and sheriff.

Tocotes having not yet been apprehended, Twynho's trial went ahead without him; she was found guilty and executed. However, on 11 May 1477, a writ of certiorari was dispatched to the sheriff of Warwick, transferring their case to the King's Bench in Westminster. On learning of this writ—which removed the danger of his arrest by the Duke—Tocotes surrendered himself to the Marshalsea Prison; he was later acquitted of complicity in the death of the Duchess.

Historians have suggested that previously loyal household servants such as Twynho, and intimates as Tocotes, may no longer have felt the Duke's service provided security or the prospect of promotion. It is known, for example, that even before Clarence's execution, Tocotes had become Master of Game for the queen, Elizabeth Woodville. However, notwithstanding his role in Clarence's downfall, he received little royal favour and actually lost the stewardships of Ringwood and Christchurch to a royal servant, William Berkeley.
