= Richard Hyde (MP for Worcestershire) =

Richard Hyde (1440–1490), of Stoke Bliss was a 15th-century member of the Herefordshire gentry and a Member of parliament for Worcestershire in the readeption parliament of King Henry VI which sat between 1470–1471 and for the same county under Edward IV the following year. He was a royal official under both kings, acting as escheator, customer and under-sheriff at various times. Hyde, originally from Swindon, had been in the service of George, Duke of Clarence since at least 1471, and was one of the men the duke sent in 1477 to arrest Ankarette Twynho of Frome, on suspicion that she had murdered the duchess with poison. He became an "esquire and king's servant" to Richard III in 1484 with an annuity of £20 per annum, and the following year received a generic royal pardon in January 1485. He was dead by April 1490 when his will was proved; he was survived by his wife, Margaret, whom he appointed his executor, and his daughter Agnes, who married one Thomas Hinkley of Worcester.

== See also ==
- George, Duke of Clarence and judicial murder
