= Lincolnshire rebellion =

Lincolnshire rebellion may refer to:

- The 1470 Lincolnshire Rebellion, fomented by Warwick the Kingmaker against Edward IV of England, put down by John de la Pole, 2nd Duke of Suffolk
- The Lincolnshire Rising of October 1536, a two-day rising by the county's Catholics against the dissolution of the monasteries
