= Thomas Burdet =

English landowner (c.1425–1477)

Thomas Burdet (c. 1425 – 11 May 1477) was the son and heir of Sir Nicholas Burdet of Arrow, but was orphaned and made a ward of Humphrey, Earl of Stafford. Originally in the service of John, Lord Beauchamp of Powicke, he had joined the retinue of Richard Neville, 16th Earl of Warwick and after the Earl's death, that of George Plantagenet, Duke of Clarence.

== Life and career ==
Burdet was a violent and litigious individual. Around 1445, Burdet was part of a gang—which included Thomas Malory and John Rous—which on numerous occasions attacked the manor of Katharine, wife of Sir William Peyto of Chesterton, Warwickshire. He supposedly had so many enemies in Wiltshire that it was recorded how, when a riot broke out in March 1477, he would have been murdered had he been present. He was a justice of the peace between 1453 and 1454.

In 1476 he was implicated in a treasonous plot against King Edward IV; his involvement supposedly stemmed from anger after the King had hunted in Burdet's park and killed his favourite white buck. Burdet, John Stacy and another Oxford clerk, Thomas Blake, were arrested. The commission condemned all three. In what the historian Charles Ross has called a "staged political trial", and Anne Crawford a "justly conducted, if political, trial", on 10 May 1477 they were found guilty of "'imagining and compassing' the king's death". This was high treason. Blake was reprieved after a petition from the Bishop of Norwich, but Burdet and Stacy, still protesting their innocence, were taken to Tyburn the following day and hanged, drawn and quartered. His trial and execution were part of a train of events that led to the fall of George, Duke of Clarence, the following year. It has also been suggested that Clarence deliberately encouraged the King to hunt in Burdet's park as a means of provoking Burdet into committing treason.

The legal historian and philosopher Nicholas St. John Green used Burdet and the white buck as an example of the development of the legal maxim that "a man is presumed to have intended the consequence of his acts". He argues that, Burdet, in anger, wished the buck, "horns and all", to appear in the belly of the one that had counselled the King to that evil deed. But, notes Green, since the King had not had a counsellor—effectively, he had counselled himself—this meant that Burdet was wishing the buck's horns to appear in the King's stomach, inevitably leading to the King's death: "the natural consequence of a wish is an act, therefore Burdet compassed the death of the king, and was guilty of treason. And upon such reasoning he was tried, condemned, and executed."

The historian Christine Carpenter has argued that, in Warwickshire, men such as Burdet "were almost the only members of the gentry who were prepared to take an active part in the Wars of the Roses", being a man with "little to lose, for they ... were already losers". Carpenter concludes that it is unsurprising that, like Burdet, "several of them came to violent or disgraceful ends". Burdet was buried in Christ Church Greyfriars, near Newgate.
