= Ankarette Twynho =

English courtier (c. 1412–1477)

Ankarette Twynho (Twinnewe, Twyniho; c. 1412–1477) was an English courtier and member of the Somerset gentry and had been a lady's maid to Isabel Neville, Duchess of Clarence, until the duchess's death, probably from complications following childbirth, in December 1476. Twynho was accused of poisoning her with bad ale. Isabel's husband, George Plantagenet, Duke of Clarence, had her seized from her house in April 1477, and after a summary trial, she was found guilty and hanged outside Warwick. Her judicial murder became a cause célèbre, and historians consider her trial and death to have contributed, with other events, to the Duke of Clarence's eventual downfall and execution in 1478.

== Life ==
Ankarette Twynho, née Hawkeston, was probably born in Cheshire or Staffordshire around 1412. She married William Twynho (Note: Also Twynmowe or Twynyho.) of Keyford, near Frome, Somerset; he was dead by 1476. Although the Twynhos were minor gentry, they were not without influence, having achieved substantial wealth through sheep farming. Members of the family entered Clarence's service in the late 1460s. William had been a long-term Clarence retainer, while Twynho sons John and William had taken part in Clarence and Warwick's rebellion of 1470, subsequently joining the Duke's household. (Note: Although Ankarette's immediate family were only minor gentry, a relative, John Twynho was recorder of Bristol and the recipient of a silver goblet from the duke—with whom he had had close links—and a man of some importance.) William and Ankarette also had a daughter Edith, who married Thomas Delalynde, of Winterborne Clenston, Dorset, while John and his wife gave Twynho a grandson, Roger. William the younger had been MP for Weymouth and Melcombe Regis between 1472 and 1475. Twynho had been in the duchess's service until her death, possibly as a lady's maid. She had a role caring for Isabel after Richard's birth but seems not to have been a midwife nor involved in the birth itself. It seems unlikely that Twynho accompanied her mistress to Warwick.

== Arrest and execution ==
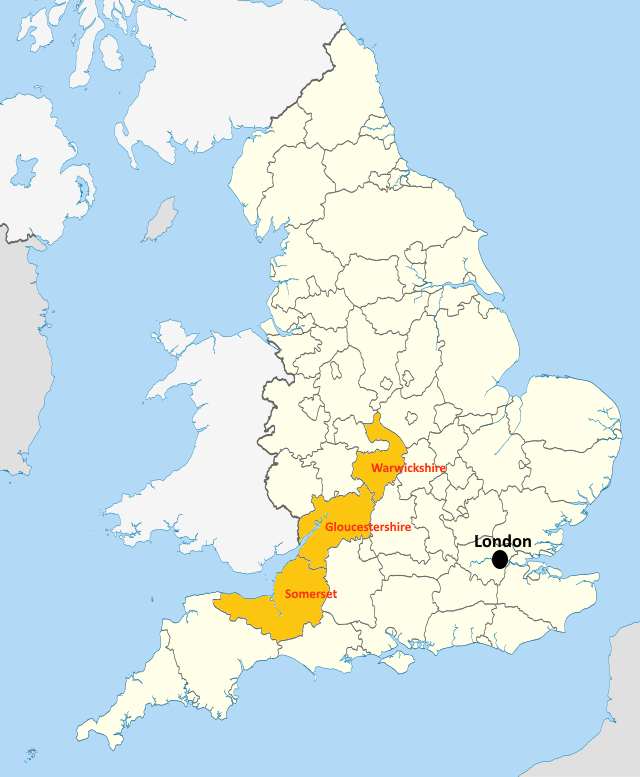
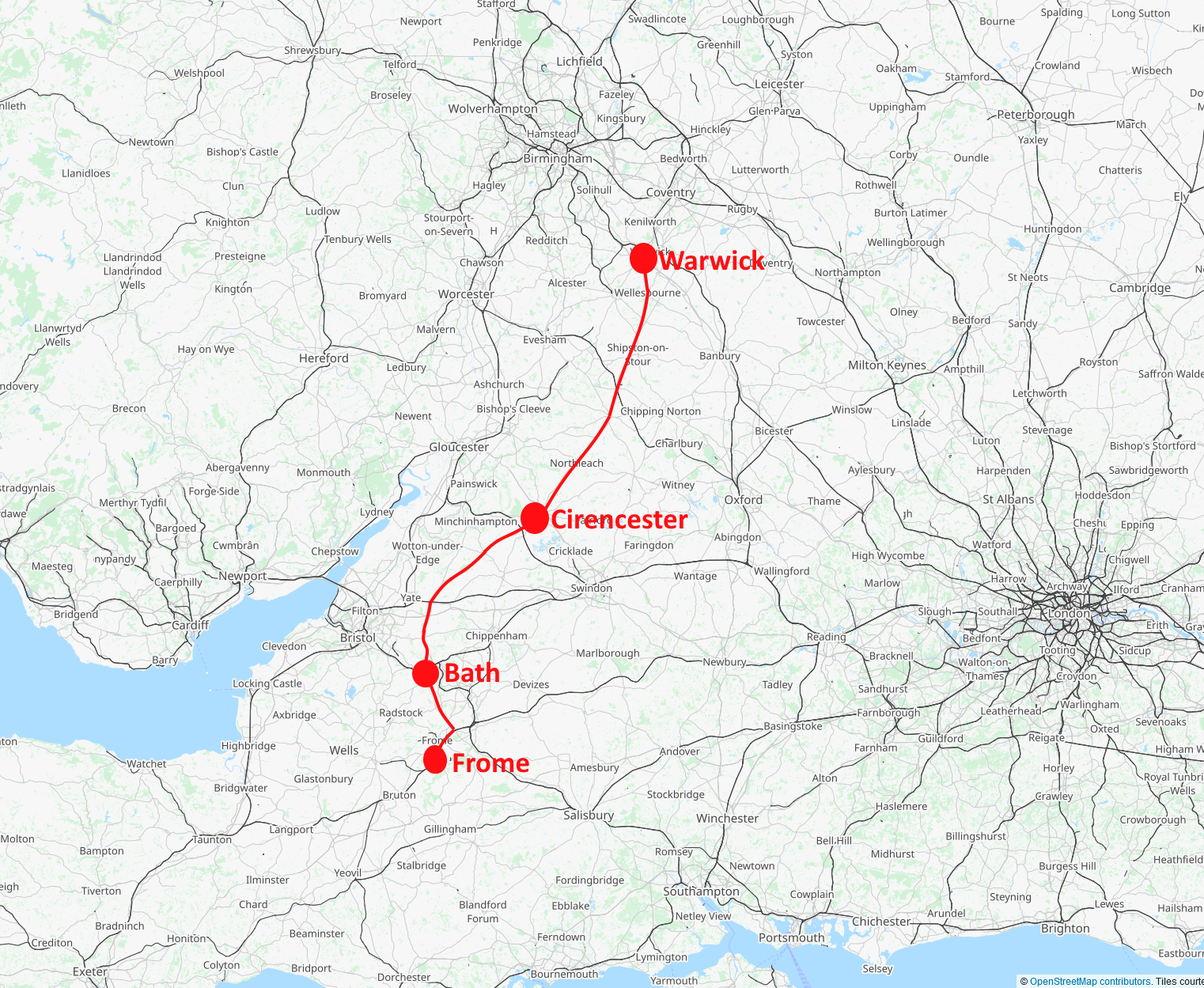

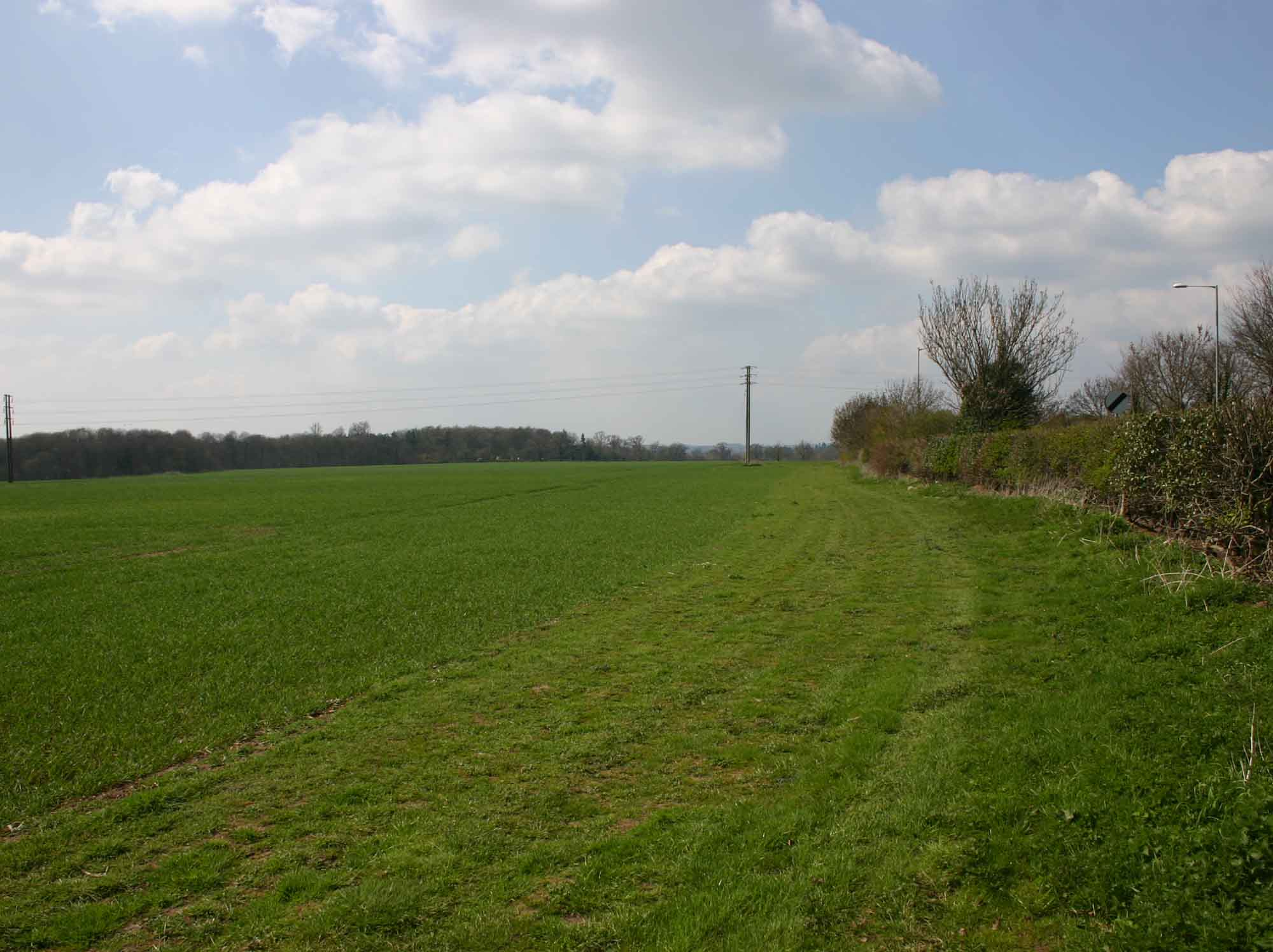
Gallows Hill, Myton, southeast of Warwick, where Twynho was hanged, seen in 2010

Isabel died on 22 December 1476, aged 25. Contemporaries believed her to be suffering a postpartum illness.

Twynho was seized at her house in Keyford, near Frome, at around 2 pm on Saturday 12 April. Richard Hyde, (Note: Hyde, originally from Swindon, had been in Clarence's service since at least 1471.) and Roger Struggle of Beckham, a clothier—both servants of Clarence from Warwick Castle—led a force of 80 men to arrest her. At this stage, witchcraft was suspected. Twynho, either accompanied or followed by her daughter and son-in-law, was first taken to Bath. On Sunday, she was moved on to Cirencester, and the party arrived in Warwick on Monday night; she had been taken 90 mi (140 km) across three shires in three days. The historian Michael Hicks has called the method of Twynho's arrest "highly irregular" and it has been compared to an abduction.

Twynho was charged with veneficium, a form of petty treason, (Note: The 1351 Statute of Treason codified the killing of a master or mistress by a servant as petty treason since it was seen as a form of rebellion. The legal scholar Graham Platts argues that "the killing of a master by a servant was a rare occurrence, it struck at the root of a fundamental relationship within feudal society and as such ... not just treason but an act of anarchy".) by giving Isabel "a venomous drink of ale mixed with poison". Twynho pleaded not guilty, although to no avail. There was only one penalty. Sentenced to death, she was to be "led from the bar to the said lord King's gaol of Warwick aforesaid, and drawn from that gaol through the centre of that town of Warwick to the gallows at Myton, and be hanged there on that gallows until ... dead". Before Twynho was taken from the castle for the last time, several jurors visited her in remorse and sought her forgiveness. They explained how being in fear of the Duke, they came to a judgment "contrary to their conscience". The Parliament Roll later recorded that:

Diverse of the same Jurre, after the said Judgment goven, came to the seid Ankarette, havyng grete remorce in their consciens, knowyng they hadde goven an untrue Verdyt in that behalf, humbly and pituously asked forgefnes thereof of the seid Ankarette...

Historians have been critical of Clarence's role in the proceedings. To Michael Hicks, Twynho's execution was judicial murder, and as "one of the most flagrant abuses of noble power in late medieval England", it was a blatant example of how an overmighty subject could abuse his position. Charles Ross described it as a "scandalous demonstration" of the misuse of magnate authority, while Rosemary Horrox cites Clarence's over-awing of the jury as a "classic symptom of bastard feudalism".

== Later events ==
The case became a cause célèbre. In late June 1477, Clarence was arrested and imprisoned in the Tower of London on charges of usurping royal authority, or "violating the laws of the realm by threatening the safety of judges and jurors", states Bellamy. He remained in custody until parliament met in January 1478, expressly to attaint him of high treason. Twynho's trial and execution did not form part of the prosecution case, although during the course of the parliament, Roger Twynho successfully petitioned that the proceedings and verdict against his grandmother should be overturned.

Clarence was also judged guilty himself of sorcery. (Note: The medical historian Jonathan Hughes argues that the events of 1477 indicate how "infiltration of black magic into the affairs of state" was unprecedented.) Found guilty, he was sentenced to death; the sentence was carried out in a private execution within the Tower on 18 February 1478.
