= Edward Plantagenet, 17th Earl of Warwick =

English nobleman (1475–1499)

Edward Plantagenet
- 17th Earl of Warwick
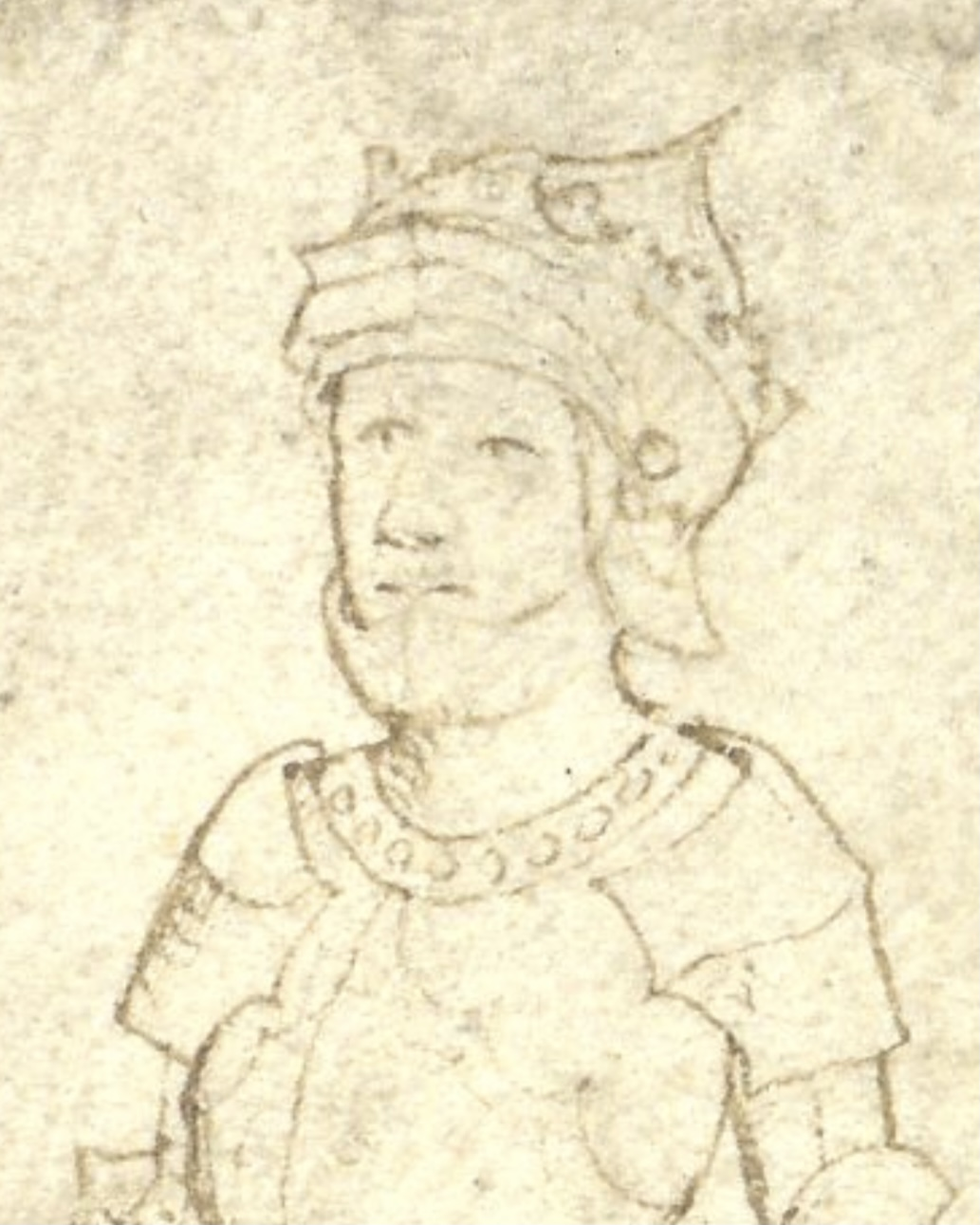
- Rendering from the "Rous Roll" by John Rous, c. 1483–1485
- Born: 25 February 1475; Warwick, Warwickshire, England
- Died: 28 November 1499 (aged 24); Tower of London, London, England
- House: York
- Father: George Plantagenet, 1st Duke of Clarence
- Mother: Isabel Neville

Edward Plantagenet, 17th Earl of Warwick (25 February 1475 – 28 November 1499) was the son of Isabel Neville and George Plantagenet, Duke of Clarence, and a potential claimant to the English throne during the reigns of both his uncle, Richard III (1483–1485), and Richard's successor, Henry VII (1485–1509). He was also a younger brother of Margaret Pole, 8th Countess of Salisbury. Edward was tried and executed for treason in 1499.

== Life ==
Coat of arms of the 17th Earl of Warwick

Edward Plantagenet was the son of George Plantagenet, 1st Duke of Clarence and Isabel Neville, who was the elder daughter of Richard Neville, 16th Earl of Warwick. Edward was born on 25 February 1475 at Warwick, the family home of his mother. At his baptism, his uncle King Edward IV stood as godfather. He was styled as Earl of Warwick from birth, but was not officially granted the title until after his father's death in 1478. His potential claim to the throne following the deposition of his cousin Edward V in 1483 was disallowed because Parliament's attainder of his father had barred Warwick from the succession in 1478. This might have been reversed by an act of Parliament, but even had this idea found favour, Parliament could not sit or legislate without being opened by the king, and the succession had not yet been decided. At this time Richard Duke of Gloucester was the senior legitimate successor to Edward IV. Edward Earl of Warwick was knighted at York by Richard III in September 1483.

In 1480, Warwick had been made a ward of King Edward IV's stepson, Thomas Grey, 1st Marquess of Dorset, who as his guardian had the power to decide whom he would marry. Clements Markham, writing in 1906, claimed that Richard III had "liberated" Warwick from the Tower of London, where Dorset had placed him; however, there are no contemporary sources for this claim, although Dorset was Constable of the Tower. Dominic Mancini wrote that Richard, on becoming king, "gave orders that the son of the duke of Clarence, his other brother, then a boy of ten years old, should come to the city: and commanded that the lad should be kept in confinement in the household of his wife".

John Rous (died 1492) wrote that after the death of Richard III's only legitimate son, Edward of Middleham, who was Warwick's double first cousin (their fathers were brothers and their mothers were sisters), Richard III named Warwick as heir to the throne; however, there is no other evidence for this, and historians have pointed out that it would be illogical for Richard to do so while Edward IV's attainder of Clarence still barred Warwick from the succession.

== Imprisonment and execution ==
Following the death on 16 March 1485 of Richard III's queen and Isabel's sister, Anne Neville, young Edward Plantagenet was vested as Earl of Salisbury by right of his mother Isabel, who had been a co-heiress with Anne to the abeyant earldom. This provided Edward with not just more wealth, but also (had he gained support) a possible claim to the throne. Following Richard III's death on 22 August 1485 at the Battle of Bosworth, Warwick, only ten years old, was imprisoned in the Tower of London as a ward of Henry VII who regarded his Plantagenet bloodline as a potential threat, albeit remote. The following year, Henry married Warwick's cousin, Elizabeth of York, to further legitimise his claim to the throne. After the appearance of the pretender who was crowned King Edward in Dublin in 1486, Henry declared that the pretender was an impostor claiming to be Edward Earl of Warwick; in Parliament in 1487 he gave the impostor's name as Lambert Simnel. In 1490, Henry's court confirmed Edward's title of Earl of Warwick (his succession to the earldom of Warwick being through his mother by grant of Edward IV). He remained a prisoner until 1499, when he became involved (willingly or unwillingly) in a plot to escape from the Tower with another prisoner. This prisoner, named by Henry as Perkin Warbeck, had threatened Henry's throne by presenting himself as the missing Richard of Shrewsbury, Duke of York, younger son of Edward IV.

On 21 November 1499, Warwick appeared at Westminster in a trial before his peers, presided over by the Earl of Oxford. A week later, Warwick was beheaded for treason on Tower Hill. Henry VII paid for his body and head to be taken to Bisham Abbey in Berkshire for burial. It was thought at the time that Warwick was executed in response to pressure from Ferdinand II of Aragon and Isabella I of Castile, whose daughter, Catherine of Aragon, was to marry Henry's heir, Arthur. Catherine was said to feel very guilty about Warwick's death, and believed that her trials in later life were punishment for it.

A number of historians have claimed that Warwick had a mental disability. This conclusion appears entirely based on the chronicler Edward Hall's contention that Warwick's lengthy imprisonment from a young age had left him "out of all company of men, and sight of beasts, in so much that he could not discern a goose from a capon."

Upon Warwick's death, both the House of Plantagenet and the House of York became extinct in the legitimate male line. However, the surviving sons of his aunt Elizabeth, Duchess of Suffolk, continued to claim the throne for the Yorkist line. Later, Warwick's sister Margaret Pole, Countess of Salisbury, was executed for treason in 1541, as Henry VIII regarded her connections to the Plantagenet dynasty as a threat.

== Ancestors ==
Ancestors of Edward Plantagenet, 17th Earl of Warwick

8. Richard of Conisburgh, 3rd Earl of Cambridge
4. Richard Plantagenet, 3rd Duke of York
9. Anne de Mortimer
2. George Plantagenet, 1st Duke of Clarence
10. Ralph de Neville, 1st Earl of Westmorland
5. Cecily Neville
11. Joan Beaufort
1. Edward Plantagenet, 17th Earl of Warwick
12. Richard Neville, 5th Earl of Salisbury
6. Richard Neville, 16th Earl of Warwick
13. Alice Neville, 5th Countess of Salisbury
3. Isabel Neville
14. Richard de Beauchamp, 13th Earl of Warwick
7. Anne Beauchamp, 16th Countess of Warwick
15. Isabel le Despenser

Edward Plantagenet, 17th Earl of Warwick House of York Cadet branch of the House of Plantagenet Born: 25 February 1475 Died: 28 November 1499
Peerage of England
Preceded by Anne Neville	Earl of Warwick; 1492–1499	Forfeit
