= John Stacy (alchemist) =

15th-century alchemist

John Stacy (died 1477) was an English alchemist, alleged astronomer and magnus necromanticus, or great sorcerer. In his time, it was believed he had successfully predicted the death of William de la Pole, Duke of Suffolk. He was later implicated in a conspiracy against Edward IV, the king of England, and executed for treason.

== Prediction of the death of William de la Pole, Duke of Suffolk ==
Contemporaries suspected him of practising the dark arts, and it was known he had predicted the death of William de la Pole, Duke of Suffolk. Stacy had warned Suffolk to beware of "the tower". Writing to John Paston in 1450, William Lomner reported how Stacy had advised Suffolk that "if he might escape the danger of the Tower, he should be safe". Suffolk, impeached in 1450 was therefore relieved that, instead of being sent to the Tower, he was exiled. But when he sailed from England, his ship was boarded by a privateer; he was murdered and his body dumped near Dover. The name of the ship that had attacked his own was Nicholas of the Tower.

== Accused of treason and executed ==
Stacy was implicated in a treasonable conspiracy against Edward IV of England in 1477. Under acerrimum examen, literally, 'severe examination' (i.e., torture)—he implicated Thomas Burdet of Arowe, a retainer of George, Duke of Clarence's household. Following Stacy's confession, Burdet and another Oxford clerk, Thomas Blake, were arrested. The commission condemned all three. In what the historian Charles Ross has called a "staged political trial", and Anne Crawford a "justly conducted, if political, trial", on 10 May 1477 they were found guilty of "'imagining and compassing' the king's death". This was high treason. Blake was reprieved after a petition from the Bishop of Norwich, but Burdet and Stacy, still protesting their innocence, were taken to Tyburn the following day and hanged, drawn and quartered.

The medical historian Jonathan Hughes argues that Stacy's involvement in the events of 1477 indicate how "infiltration of black magic into the affairs of state" was unprecedented.
