= Daniel Curzon =

American dramatist

- Born: Daniel Russell Brown; March 19, 1938 (age 88)
- Died: 12/7/2025, Millbrae, California
- Education: University of Detroit (PhB); Kent State University (MA); Wayne State University (PhD)
- Occupations: Novelist; playwright; educator; writer

Daniel Curzon (born March 19, 1938) is an American novelist, playwright, educator, and writer of etiquette manuals for gay men.

Born Daniel Russell Brown, Curzon received his Ph.B. from the University of Detroit in 1960, his M.A. from Kent State University in 1961, and his Ph.D. from Wayne State University in 1969. He has taught at a number of universities since 1962; from 1980 until his retirement, he taught at the City College of San Francisco as an instructor in English.

He is the author of Something You Do in the Dark, first published by G. P. Putnam in 1971. It is the story of a gay man's attempt to avenge his entrapment by a Detroit vice squad police officer by murdering him. Chris Freeman says the book is "filled with rage at the oppression gay people experience" Encyclopedia of American literature said that it had a "gloomy" tone. The Los Angeles Advocate appreciated "its spirit of nowness" as the first gay protest novel. The Misadventures of Tim McPick (original title: Queer Comedy) was called a "light-hearted picaresque". The World Can Break Your Heart, a coming out story, follows a different pace than many in the genre, and thus for the character, coming out provides fewer rewards and causes greater sacrifices.

Other works include From Violent Men, Among the Carnivores, Curzon in Love, The Bubble Reputation, or Shakespeare Lives!, and What a Tangled Web. His non-fiction books include The Big Book of In-Your-Face Gay Etiquette and Dropping Names: The Delicious Memoirs of Daniel Curzon.

Curzon edited and published the early homophile magazine "Gay Literature: A New Journal" in 1975 and 1976. The magazine included poetry, fiction, literary reviews, essays, photography, and short plays. Curzon's own written work sometimes was included. Curzon contributed articles for other magazines such as "Gay Times" in 1976 and "Alternate" in 1978.

In the theater, Curzon won the Southwest Theater Association's National New Play contest with Godot Arrives in 1999. His play My Unknown Son was produced off-Broadway at the Circle Rep Lab in 1987 and at the Kaufmann Theatre in 1988, as well as in Los Angeles in 1997. Baker's Plays published Curzon's one-act play, A Fool's Audition. Seven volumes of his Collected Plays have been published as POD books through BookSurge. His plays have also been performed at such theaters as Theater Rhinoceros, New Conservatory Theater, New City Theater, Above Board Theater, as well as at the Fringe Festival in San Francisco and the Edinburgh Fringe Festival.

Curzon, who is openly gay, is currently a retired professor of English.

== Bibliography ==
Fiction

- Curzon, Daniel (1978). Among the carnivores. Port Washington, N.Y.: Ashley Books. ISBN 9780879491246.
- Curzon, Daniel (1983). The bubble reputation, or, Shakespeare lives!. San Francisco: IGNA Books. ISBN 9780930650223.
- Curzon, Daniel (1988). Curzon in love. Stamford, Conn.: Knights Press. ISBN 9780915175277.
- Curzon, Daniel (1983). From violent men : a novel. San Francisco: IGNA Books. ISBN 9780930650049.
- Curzon, Daniel (1981). Human warmth & other stories. San Francisco: Grey Fox Press. ISBN 9780912516530.
- Curzon, Daniel (1975). The misadventures of Tim McPick. [Los Angeles]: John Parke Custis Press.
- Curzon, Daniel (1999). Not necessarily nice : stories. Princeton, NJ: Xlibris. ISBN 9780738803012.
- Curzon, Daniel (1998). Only the good parts : a novel. Princeton, NJ: Xlibris. ISBN 9780966350111.
- Curzon, Daniel (1978). The revolt of the perverts. San Francisco: Leland Mellott Books. ISBN 9780930650018.
- Curzon, Daniel (2012). Saving Jane Austen. San Francisco: IGNA Books. ISBN 9780930650308.
- Curzon, Daniel (2004). Something You Do in the Dark. San Francisco: IGNA Books. ISBN 0-930650-16-6.
- Curzon, Daniel (1996). Superfag. San Francisco: IGNA Books.
- Curzon, Daniel (2004). What a tangled web : a non-fiction narrative. San Francisco: IGNA Books. ISBN 9780930650155.
- Curzon, Daniel (1984). The world can break your heart. Stamford, Conn.: Knights Press. ISBN 9780915175079.

Etiquette

- Curzon, Daniel (2006). Big book of in-your-face gay etiquette. San Francisco: IGNA Books. ISBN 9780930650193.
- Curzon, Daniel (1982). The joyful blue book of gracious gay etiquette. San Francisco: IGNA Books. ISBN 9780930650049.

Memoirs

- Curzon, Daniel (2004). Dropping names : the delicious memoirs of Daniel Curzon. San Francisco: IGNA Books. ISBN 9780930650179.

Plays

- Curzon, Daniel (1993). Beer and rhubarb pie. Dallas, TX: Dialogus Play Service.
- Curzon, Daniel (2003–2004). Collected plays of Daniel Curzon. San Francisco: IGNA Books. ISBN 0930650077.
- Curzon, Daniel; Dan Turner (1978). Comeback. Dallas, TX: Dialogus Play Service.
- Curzon, Daniel (1993). Demons. Dallas, TX: Dialogus Play Service.
- Curzon, Daniel (1994). Don't rub me the wrong way. Dallas, TX: Dialogus Play Service.
- Curzon, Daniel (1993). Homosexual acts. Dallas, TX: Dialogus Play Service.
- Curzon, Daniel (1993). The murder of Gonzago : a comedy. Dallas, TX: Dialogus Play Service.
- Curzon, Daniel (1993). My unknown son. Dallas, TX: Dialogus Play Service.
- Curzon, Daniel (1993). Pixies in peril. Dallas, TX: Dialogus Play Service.
- Curzon, Daniel (1993). When Bertha was a pretty name. Dallas, TX: Dialogus Play Service.
