= 1470 Lincolnshire Rebellion =

The Lincolnshire Rebellion was a popular uprising against King Edward IV in 1470. It was sponsored by Richard Neville, 16th Earl of Warwick, who had once been loyal to the king but had gradually fallen out with him, opposing his unpopular marriage and aspects of English foreign policy.

== Background ==
The rebellion was founded on popular discontent, but, as historian Charles Ross said, "in this strongly hierarchical society the 'people' could only seriously influence events if they had the backing and support of the upper ranks of society," and the Neville family were a powerful regional influence. Warwick was clearly attempting to mimic the success of another rebellion he had instigated the previous year- that of Robin of Redesdale, which successfully lured the king north and into a trap. This enabled Warwick to rule the country through Edward for some months. But this time, the trap did not work. However, he was unable to successfully emasculate the power of the Woodville family during this period (although reducing it somewhat), or return to his previous position as the king's single most important councillor. At this point the king had still not had a male heir, and his brother, George, Duke of Clarence - Warwick's ally - was heir to the throne. Although the extent of Warwick's and Clarence's involvement in the rebellion is disputed by modern historians (for example, it has been argued that they had no involvement at all, and that it was an attempt by the crown to smear them for political reasons).

== Events of the rebellion ==
Whereas Edward's own lethargy was responsible for his capture in 1469, this contrasts with the energy and vigour he demonstrated when Lincolnshire rebelled the following year.

== Aftermath ==
As a result of their instigation of the rebellion being discovered, Warwick and Clarence fled through Kent and escaped to the court of King Louis XI of France, following which, Louis engineered a reconciliation between the earl and his erstwhile opponent, Margaret of Anjou.
