= Isabel Neville, Duchess of Clarence =

English noblewoman (1451–1476)

Lady Isabel Neville
- Duchess of Clarence
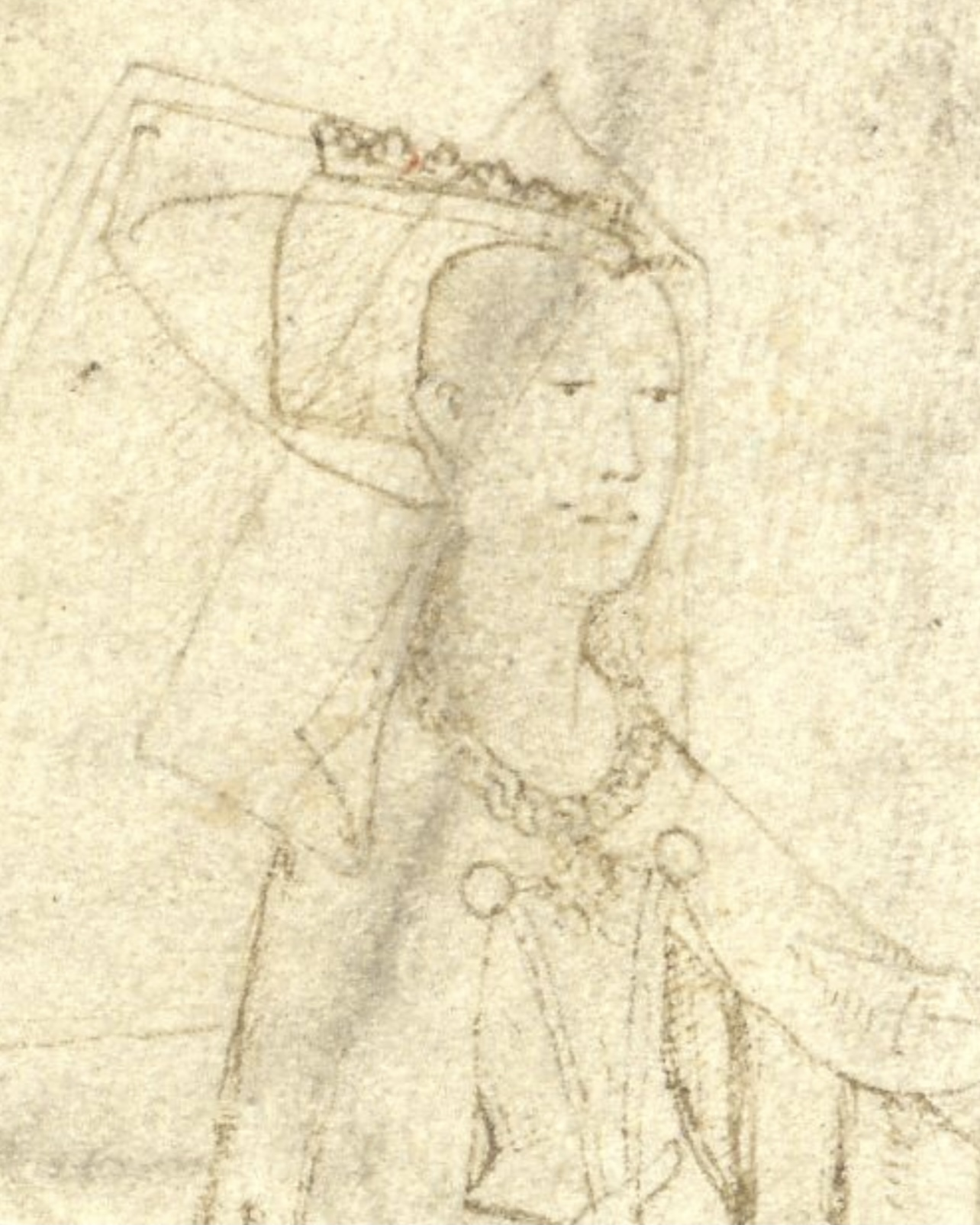
- Posthumous drawing of Isabel from the Rous Roll, c. 1483
- Born: 5 September 1451; Warwick Castle, Warwickshire, England
- Died: 22 December 1476 (aged 25); Warwick Castle, Warwickshire, England
- Burial: Tewkesbury Abbey, Gloucestershire, England
- Spouse: George Plantagenet, Duke of Clarence (m. 1469)
- Issue more...: Margaret Pole, Countess of Salisbury; Edward Plantagenet, 17th Earl of Warwick
- Father: Richard Neville, 16th Earl of Warwick
- Mother: Anne Beauchamp, 16th Countess of Warwick

Lady Isabel Neville (5 September 1451 – 22 December 1476) was the elder daughter and co-heiress of Richard Neville, 16th Earl of Warwick (the Kingmaker of the Wars of the Roses), and Anne de Beauchamp, suo jure 16th Countess of Warwick. She was the wife of George Plantagenet, Duke of Clarence. She was also the elder sister of Anne Neville, wife and consort of Clarence's brother, Richard III.

== Life ==
Isabel Neville was born at Warwick Castle, the seat of the Earls of Warwick, on 5 September 1451.

On 11 July 1469, Isabel secretly married George Plantagenet, Duke of Clarence, the younger brother of Edward IV, in Église Notre-Dame de Calais. The marriage was arranged against the King's wishes by her father, and the ceremony was conducted by Isabel's uncle George Neville, archbishop of York. The marriage without his consent angered Edward, as until he had a son with his wife Elizabeth Woodville, Clarence was his heir presumptive. Following the marriage, Clarence joined forces with Warwick and allied with the Lancastrians led by Margaret of Anjou, queen consort to Henry VI.

After Isabel Neville's sister Anne was married to Edward of Westminster, Prince of Wales, the son and heir of Henry VI, Clarence rejoined his brother, realising that it was now unlikely that he would become king. Letters, from King Edward, were taken to Clarence by an unnamed lady who came to visit Isabel before Warwick and Clarence invaded England for the Lancastrians in September 1470. Inside these letters were promises of reconciliation from the king if Clarence abandoned the cause of Warwick and the Lancastrians. Clarence replied that he would join King Edward as soon as was conveniently possible.

== Marriage and children ==
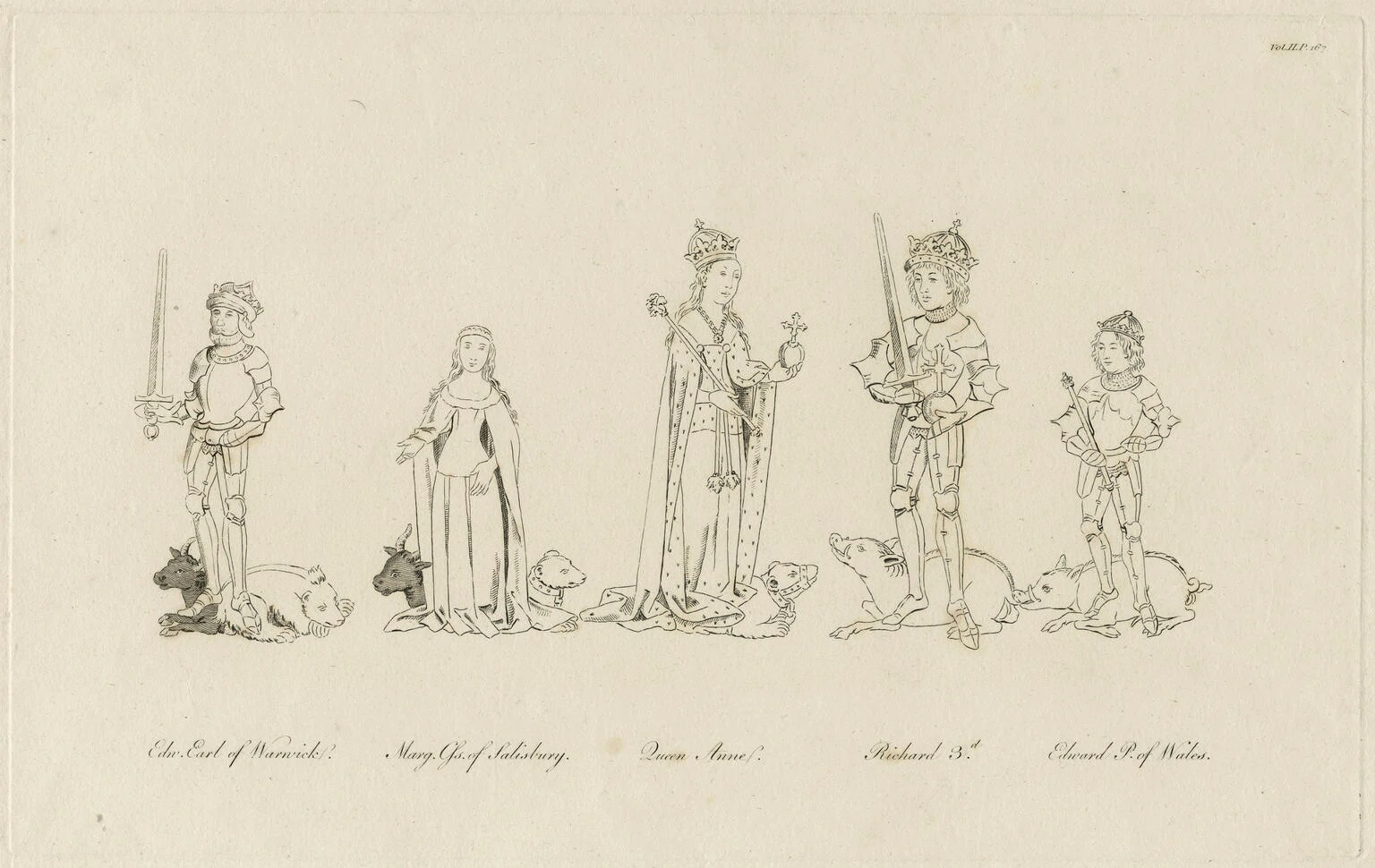
Isabel's two surviving children with her sister, nephew and brother-in-law

Isabel Neville married George Plantagenet, Duke of Clarence, in Calais, France, on 11 July 1469. Four children resulted:

- No name (c. 17 April 1470), born outside Calais whilst Isabel and her husband were fleeing England. Died at sea. Identified by some sources as a girl named Anne, and by others as an unnamed boy.
- Margaret Pole, 8th Countess of Salisbury (14 August 1473 – 27 May 1541). Married Sir Richard Pole; had five children; executed by Henry VIII.
- Edward Plantagenet, 17th Earl of Warwick (25 February 1475 – 28 November 1499). Executed by Henry VII for attempting to escape from the Tower of London.
- Richard of Clarence (5 October 1476 – 1 January 1477), born at Tewkesbury Abbey, Gloucestershire, died at Warwick Castle, Warwickshire, buried Warwick.

== Death ==
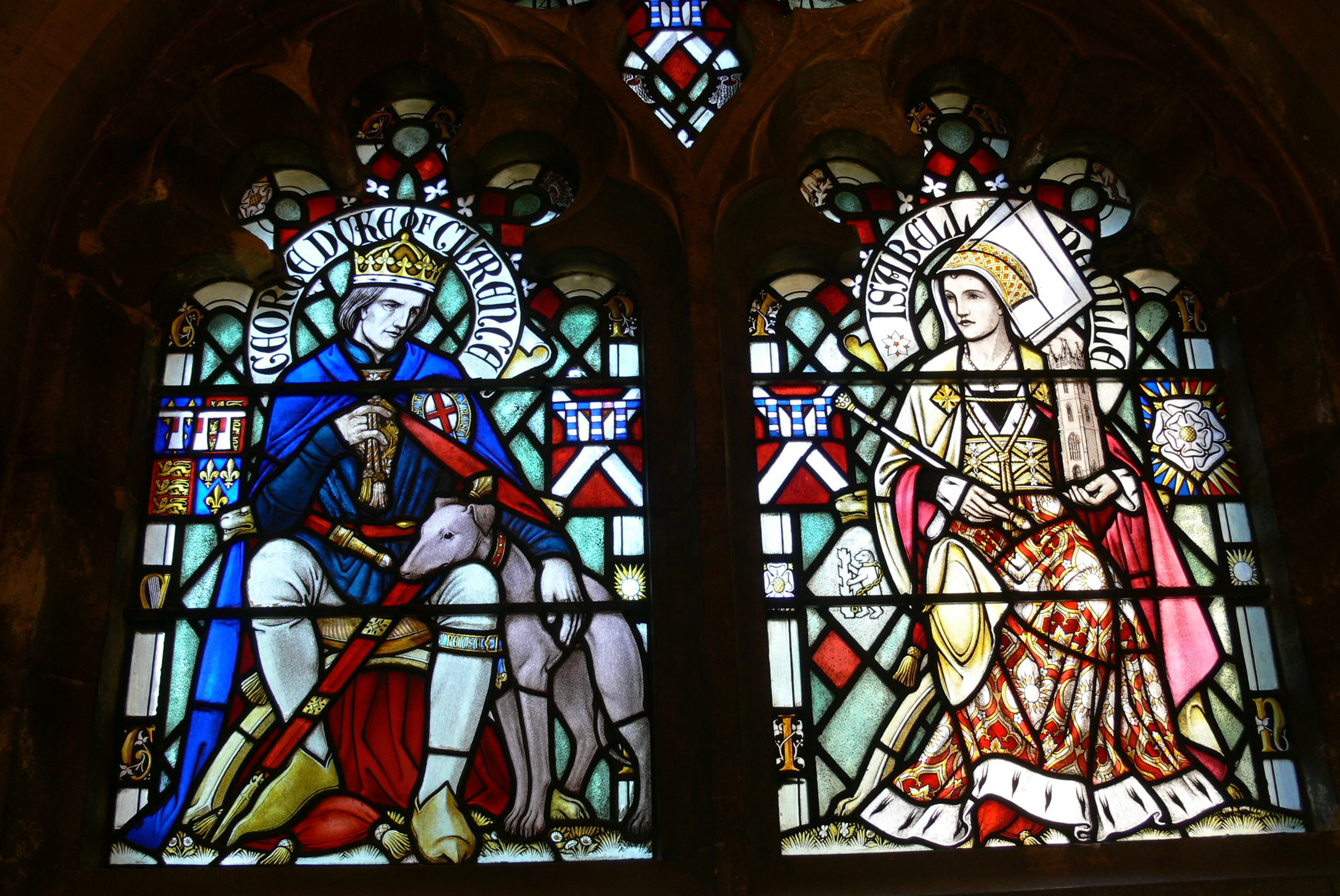
The Duke and Duchess of Clarence, Cardiff Castle

Isabel Neville died on 22 December 1476, two and a half months after the birth of Richard. It is now thought the cause was either consumption or childbed fever (puerperal fever), yet at the time her husband accused one of her ladies-in-waiting of having murdered her with a poisoned drink. He committed in his turn a notorious judicial murder of the lady, called Ankarette Twynho.

Ankarette's grandson Roger Twynyho received from Edward IV a full retrospective pardon for Ankarette, and the petition he submitted to the king in 1478 describes fully the circumstances of the case, well illustrating the quasi-kingly high-handedness of Clarence, which was ultimately not tolerated by the king:

"That whereas the said Ankarette on Saturday, 12 April, 17 Edward IV [i.e.1477], was in her manor at Cayford [i.e. Keyford, Somerset] and Richard Hyde late of Warwick, gentleman, and Roger Strugge late of Bekehampton, co. Somerset, towker, with divers riotous persons to the number of fourscore by the command of George, duke of Clarence, came to Cayforde about two of the clock after noon and entered her house and carried her off the same day to Bath and from thence on the Sunday following to Circeter [i.e. Cirencester], co. Gloucester, and from thence to Warwick, whither they brought her on the Monday following about eight of the clock in the afternoon, which town of Warwick is distant from Cayforde seventy miles, and then and there took from her all her jewels, money and goods and also in the said duke's behalf, as though he had used king's power, commanded Thomas Delalynde, esquire, and Edith his wife, daughter of the said Ankarette, and their servants to avoid from the town of Warwick and lodge them at Strattforde upon Aven that night, six miles from thence, and the said duke kept Ankarette in prison unto the hour of nine before noon on the morrow, to wit, the Tuesday after the closing of Pasche [i.e. Easter], and then caused her to be brought to the Guildhall at Warwick before divers of the justices of the peace in the county then sitting in sessions and caused her to be indicted by the name of Ankarette Twynneowe, late of Warwick, widow, late servant of the duke and Isabel his wife, of having at Warwick on 10 October, 16 Edward IV., given to the said Isabel a venomous drink of ale mixed with poison, of which the latter sickened until the Sunday before Christmas, on which day she died, and the justices arraigned the said Ankarette and a jury appeared and found her guilty and it was considered that she should be led from the bar there to the gaol of Warwick and from thence should be drawn through the town to the gallows of Myton and hanged till she were dead, and the sheriff was commanded to do execution and so he did, which indictment, trial and judgment were done and given within three hours of the said Tuesday, and the jurors for fear gave the verdict contrary to their conscience, in proof whereof divers of them came to the said Ankarette in remorse and asked her forgiveness, in consideration of the imaginations of the said duke and his great might, the unlawful taking of the said Ankarette through three several shires, the inordinate hasty process and judgement, her lamentable death and her good disposition, the king should ordain that the record, process, verdict and judgement should be void and of no effect, but that as the premises were done by the command of the said duke the said justices and sheriff and the under-sheriff and their ministers should not be vexed. The answer of the king was: Soit fait comme il est désiré ("Let it be done as the petitioner requests")".

Isabel was buried at Tewkesbury Abbey in Gloucestershire.

=== Arms ===
Coat of arms of Isabel Neville, Duchess of Clarence
Notes The Duchess bore the arms of her husband, George, Duke of Clarence, impaled with her father's. Adopted 1469 Coronet Coronet of a son of a Sovereign Escutcheon Quarterly 1st and 4th, France ancien, 2nd and 3rd England, with a label of three points Argent each point charged with a canton Gules (York); impaled with Gules a saltire Argent, a label of three points gobony, Argent and Azure (Neville).

== Modern Portrayals ==
Isabel has been featured in two books by author Philippa Gregory:

- The Kingmaker's Daughter
- The King's Curse.

Isabel is a character in Sharon Penman's novel, The Sunne in Splendour.

Isabel is a character in Meredith Whitford's novel Treason.

She is also portrayed by Eleanor Tomlinson in the BBC television mini-series The White Queen (2013).
