= George Plantagenet, Duke of Clarence =

English magnate (1449–1478)

George Plantagenet
- Duke of Clarence
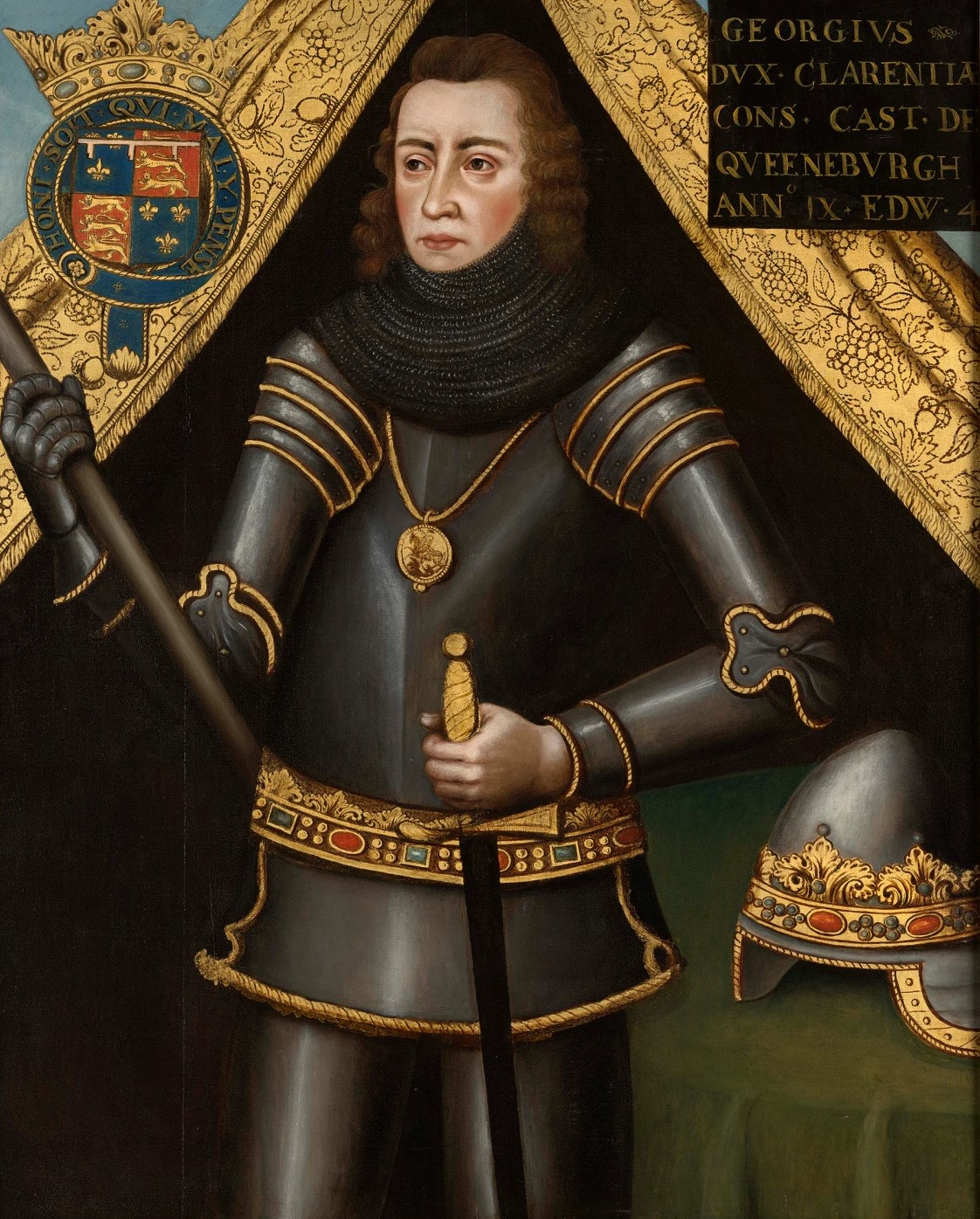
- 16th-century portrait after Lucas Cornelisz de Kock
- Born: 21 October 1449; Dublin Castle, Ireland
- Died: 18 February 1478 (aged 28); Tower of London, England
- Burial: 25 February 1478; Tewkesbury Abbey, Gloucestershire, England
- Spouse: Isabel Neville (m. 1469; died 1476)
- Issue more...: Margaret Pole, Countess of Salisbury; Edward Plantagenet, 17th Earl of Warwick
- House: York
- Father: Richard of York, 3rd Duke of York
- Mother: Cecily Neville

George Plantagenet, Duke of Clarence (21 October 1449 – 18 February 1478), was the sixth child and third surviving son of Richard of York, 3rd Duke of York, and Cecily Neville, Duchess of York, and the brother of English kings Edward IV and Richard III. He played an important role in the dynastic struggle between rival factions of the Plantagenets now known as the Wars of the Roses.

Though a member of the House of York, he switched sides to support the House of Lancaster, before reverting to the Yorkists. He was later convicted of treason against his elder brother, Edward IV, and executed, allegedly by drowning in malmsey wine. He appears as a character in William Shakespeare's plays Henry VI, Part 3 and Richard III, in which his death is attributed to the machinations of Richard.

== Life ==
Arms of George Plantagenet, Duke of Clarence: Royal arms differenced by a label of three points argent each charged with a canton gules.

George was born on 21 October 1449 in Dublin at a time when his father, the Duke of York, had begun to challenge Henry VI for the crown. His godfather was James FitzGerald, 6th Earl of Desmond. He was the second of the three sons of Richard and Cecily who survived their father and became a potential claimant for the crown. His father died in 1460. In 1461 his elder brother, Edward, became King of England as Edward IV and George was made Duke of Clarence. Despite his youth, he was appointed as Lord Lieutenant of Ireland in the same year.

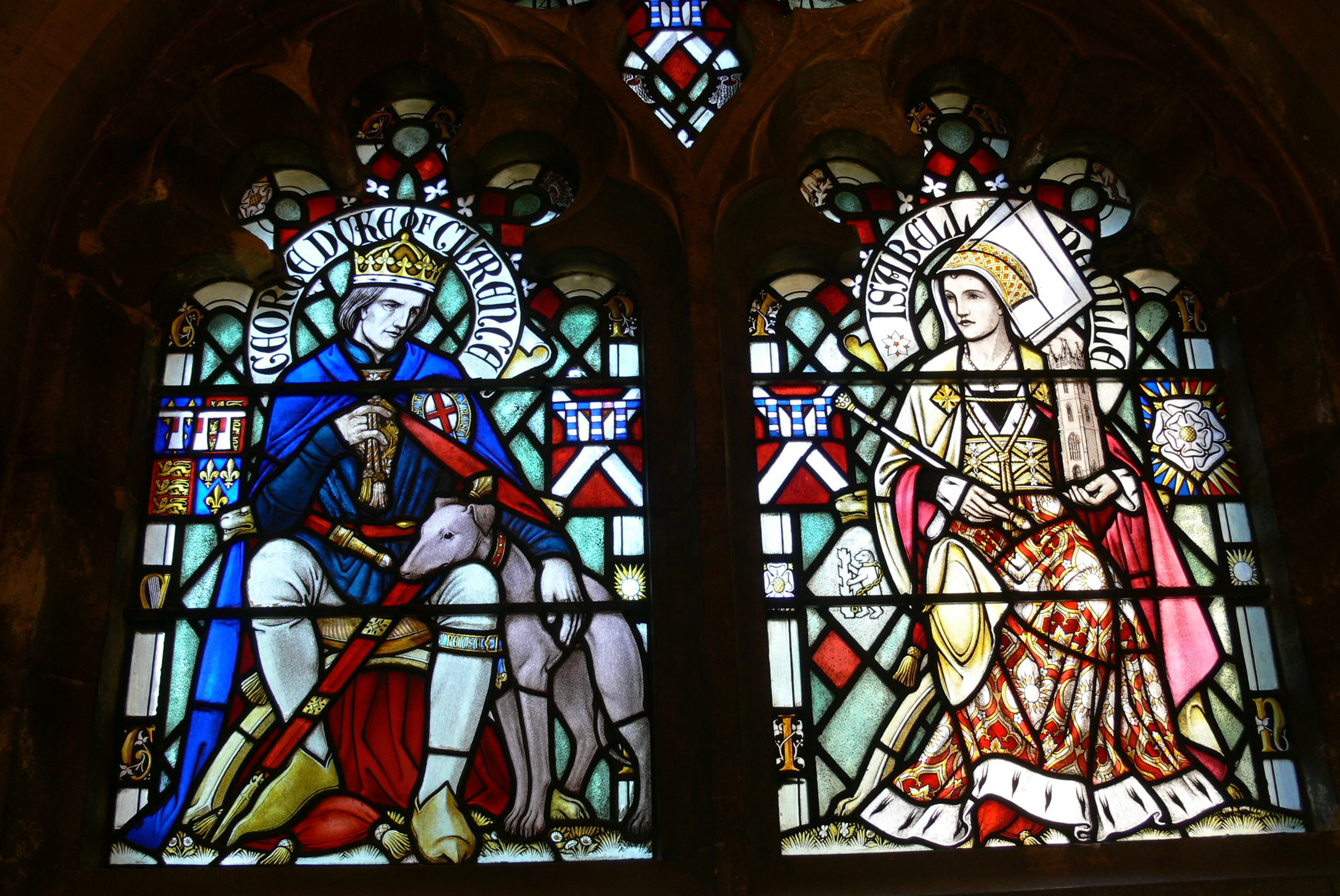
The Duke and Duchess of Clarence, as portrayed at Cardiff Castle.

Having been mentioned as a prospective husband for Mary, daughter of Charles the Bold, Duke of Burgundy, Clarence came under the influence of his first cousin Richard Neville, Earl of Warwick, and in July 1469 was married in Église Notre-Dame de Calais to the earl's elder daughter Isabel Neville.

Clarence had actively supported his elder brother's claim to the throne, but when his father-in-law (known as "the Kingmaker") deserted Edward IV to ally with Margaret of Anjou, consort of the deposed King Henry VI, Clarence supported him and was deprived of his office as Lord Lieutenant. Clarence joined Warwick in France, taking his pregnant wife. She gave birth to their first child, a girl, on 16 April 1470, in a ship off Calais. The child died shortly afterwards. Henry VI rewarded Clarence by making him next in line to the throne after his own son, justifying the exclusion of Edward IV both by attainder for his treason against the House of Lancaster as well as his alleged illegitimacy. After a short time, Clarence realized that his loyalty to his father-in-law was misplaced: Warwick had his younger daughter, Anne Neville, Clarence's sister-in-law, marry Henry VI's son in December 1470. This demonstrated that his father-in-law was less interested in making him king than in serving his own interests and, since it now seemed unlikely that Warwick would replace Edward IV with Clarence, Clarence was secretly reconciled with Edward.

Warwick's efforts to keep Henry VI on the throne ultimately failed and Warwick was killed at the Battle of Barnet in April 1471. The re-instated King Edward IV restored his brother Clarence to royal favour by making him Great Chamberlain of England. As his father-in-law had died, Clarence became jure uxoris Earl of Warwick, but did not inherit the entire Warwick estate as his younger brother, Richard, Duke of Gloucester, had married (c. 1472) Anne Neville, who had been widowed in 1471. Edward intervened and eventually divided the estates between his brothers. Clarence was created, by right of his wife, first Earl of Warwick on 25 March 1472, and first Earl of Salisbury in a new creation.

In 1475 Clarence's wife Isabel gave birth to a son, Edward, later Earl of Warwick. Isabel died on 22 December 1476, two months after giving birth to a short-lived son named Richard (5 October 1476 – 1 January 1477). George and Isabel are buried together at Tewkesbury Abbey in Gloucestershire. Their surviving children, Margaret and Edward, were cared for by their aunt, Anne Neville, until she died in 1485 when Edward was 10 years old.

== Death ==
Though most historians now believe Isabel's death was a result of either consumption (tuberculosis) or childbed fever, Clarence was convinced she had been poisoned by one of her ladies-in-waiting, Ankarette Twynho, whom, as a consequence, he had judicially murdered in April 1477, by summarily arresting her and bullying a jury at Warwick into convicting her of murder by poisoning. She was hanged immediately after trial with John Thursby, a fellow defendant. She was posthumously pardoned in 1478 by King Edward. Clarence's mental state, never stable, deteriorated from that point and led to his involvement in yet another rebellion against his brother Edward.

According to the bill of attainder passed against him, Clarence made a number of his servants swear personal loyalty to him and sent them into various parts of the kingdom to stir up rebellion against Edward, claiming that Edward intended to disinherit him and that he had used witchcraft to poison his subjects. It was also alleged that he had plotted to have a "strange child" pose as his son, while he intended to send his own son into Ireland or Flanders to get assistance against Edward, but this plan was not successful. Clarence was also said to have secretly kept a document signed by Henry VI, specifying that Clarence was to become king in the event of his death.

In 1477 Clarence was again a suitor for the hand of Mary, who had just become duchess of Burgundy. Edward objected to the match, and Clarence left the court.

The arrest and committal to the Tower of London of one of Clarence's retainers, an Oxford astronomer named John Stacy, led to his confession under torture that he had "imagined and compassed" the death of the king, and used the black arts to accomplish this. He implicated Thomas Burdet, and Thomas Blake, a chaplain at Stacey's college (Merton College, Oxford). All three were tried for treason, convicted, and condemned to be drawn to Tyburn and hanged. Blake was saved at the eleventh hour by a plea for his life from James Goldwell, Bishop of Norwich, but the other two were put to death as ordered.

This was a clear warning to Clarence, which he chose to ignore. He appointed John Goddard to burst into Parliament and regale the House with Burdet and Stacy's declarations of innocence that they had made before their deaths. Goddard was a very unwise choice, as he was an ex-Lancastrian who had expounded Henry VI's claim to the throne. Edward summoned Clarence to Windsor, severely upbraided him, accused him of treason, and ordered his immediate arrest and confinement.

Clarence was imprisoned in the Tower of London and put on trial for treason against his brother Edward IV. Clarence was not present – Edward himself prosecuted his brother, and demanded that Parliament pass a bill of attainder against his brother, declaring that he was guilty of "unnatural, loathly treasons" which were aggravated by the fact that Clarence was his brother, who, if anyone did, owed him loyalty and love. Following his conviction and attainder, he was "privately executed" at the Tower on 18 February 1478, by tradition in the Bowyer Tower, and soon after the event, a rumour spread that he had been drowned in a butt of malmsey wine.

A reason for Edward to have his brother executed may have been that George had "threatened to question the legality of the royal marriage" and he may have discovered from Bishop Robert Stillington of Bath and Wells that George "had probably let slip the secret of the precontract" for Edward's marriage with Lady Eleanor Talbot, although others dispute this.

== In Shakespeare ==
Clarence is a principal character in two of William Shakespeare's history plays: Henry VI, Part 3 and Richard III. Shakespeare portrays Clarence as weak-willed and changeable. His initial defection from Edward IV to Warwick is prompted by resentment at the favours bestowed by Edward to the family of his queen Elizabeth Woodville. Despite several speeches proclaiming loyalty to Warwick, and to Henry VI, Clarence defects back to Edward's side when he sees his brothers again; it takes only a few lines for his brothers to shame him into rejoining the Yorkist party. Several lines reference his penchant for wine.

Richard III opens with Gloucester having framed Clarence for treason, using a soothsayer to sow doubt in the King's mind about his brother, and in the first scene Clarence is arrested and taken to the Tower. Gloucester stage-manages Clarence's death, fast-tracking the order of execution and intercepting the King's pardon when Edward changes his mind. In Act I sc iv, Clarence recounts a terrifying nightmare in which he has been pushed (accidentally) into the ocean by Gloucester and drowns, then finds himself in hell, accused of perjury by the ghosts of Warwick and Prince Edward. When he is attacked by assassins sent by Gloucester, he pleads eloquently and nobly but is stabbed and drowned in a butt of Malmsey wine. It is Clarence's death that sends Edward into a fatal attack of remorse. Clarence is the first character to die in the play; his ghost later appears to Gloucester, then already Richard III, and Henry Tudor, the future Henry VII of England, before the Battle of Bosworth Field, cursing his brother and encouraging Henry.

== Children ==
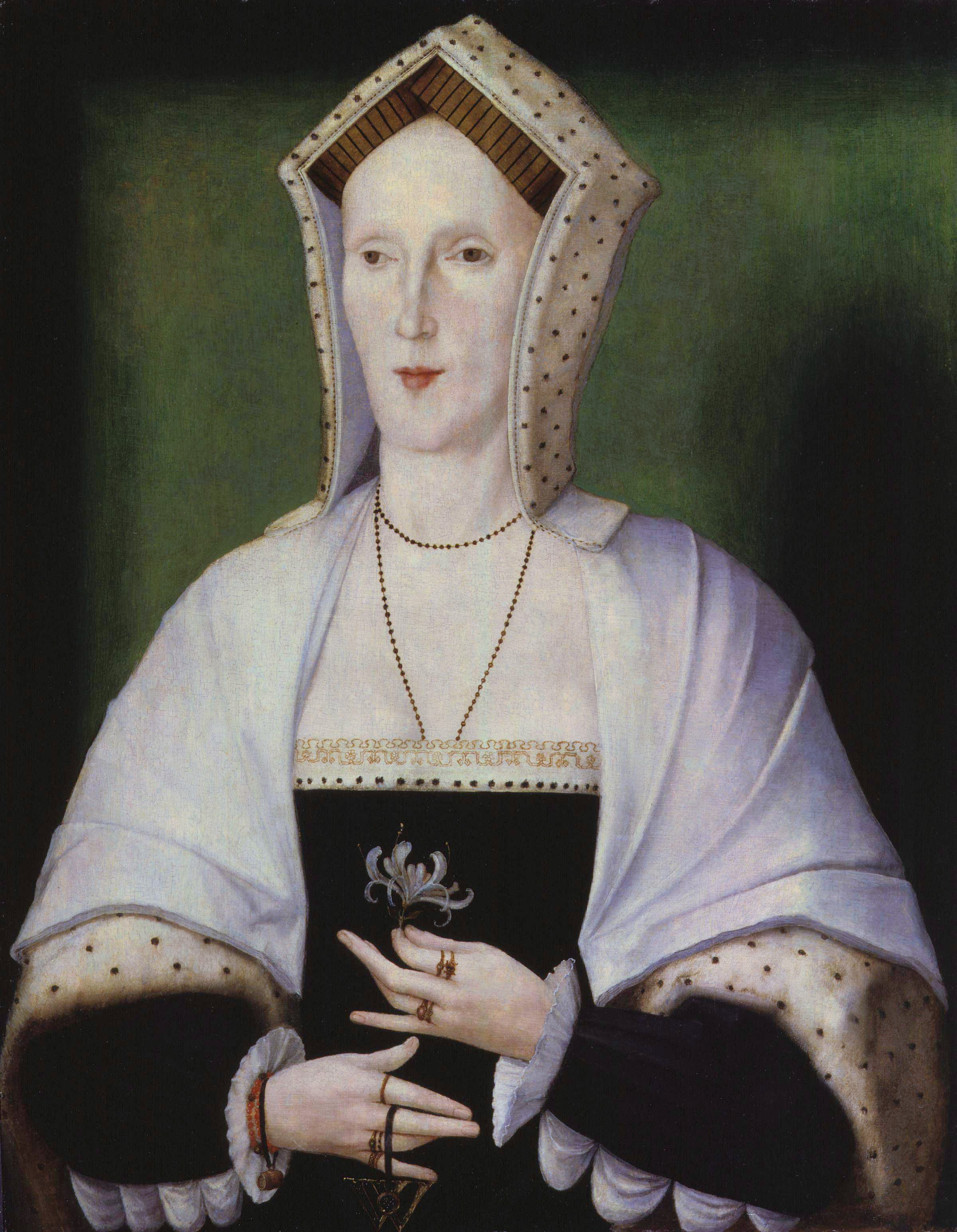
Margaret Pole, Countess of Salisbury

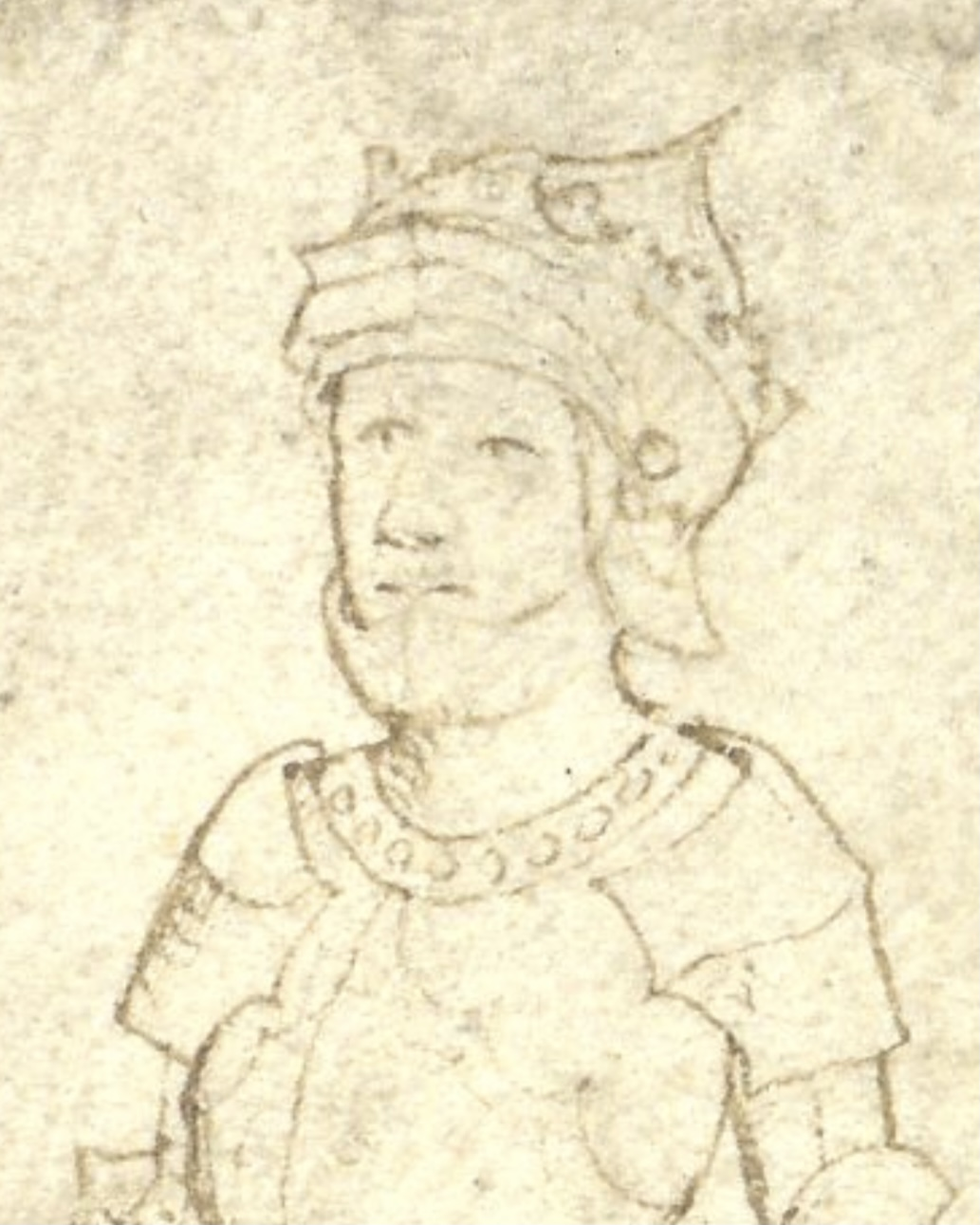
Edward Plantagenet, 17th Earl of Warwick

Clarence married Isabel Neville in Calais, at that time controlled by England, on 11 July 1469. Together they had four children:

- Unnamed (16 April 1470 – c. 17 April 1470), who was born and died in a ship off Calais. Identified by some sources as a girl named Anne but by others as an unnamed boy.
- Margaret Pole, Countess of Salisbury (14 August 1473 – 27 May 1541); married Sir Richard Pole; executed by Henry VIII.
- Edward Plantagenet, 17th Earl of Warwick (25 February 1475 – 28 November 1499); executed by Henry VII on grounds of attempting to escape from the Tower of London.
- Richard of Clarence (5 October 1476 – 1 January 1477); born at Tewkesbury Abbey, Gloucestershire; died at Warwick Castle and buried in Warwick.

== Genealogy ==
English royal families in the Wars of the Roses

Dukes (except Aquitaine) and Princes of Wales are noted, as are the monarchs' reigns.
†=Killed in action; =Executed
See also Family tree of English monarchs

Henry of Grosmont; Duke of Lancaster	Edward III; King of England r. 1327–1377
Edward of Woodstock "The Black Prince"; Prince of Wales	Thomas of Woodstock; Duke of Gloucester	Blanche of Lancaster	John of Gaunt; Duke of Lancaster	Katherine Swynford	Edmund of Langley; Duke of York	Lionel of Antwerp; Duke of Clarence
Edward of Angoulême	Richard II; Prince of Wales, King of England r. 1377–1399	Henry IV; Duke of Lancaster, King of England r. 1399–1413	John Beaufort	Thomas Beaufort; Duke of Exeter	Joan Beaufort	Ralph Neville	Philippa of Clarence
Owen Tudor; Lancastrian	Catherine of Valois	Henry V Duke of Lancaster, Prince of Wales, King of England r. 1413–1422	Humphrey; Duke of Gloucester	Henry Percy "Hotspur"	Elizabeth Mortimer	Roger Mortimer
Edward of Norwich; Duke of York	Richard of Conisburgh	Anne de Mortimer
John Beaufort; Duke of Somerset; Lancastrian	Margaret of Anjou; Lancastrian	Henry VI; King of England r. 1422–1461, r. 1470–1471; Lancastrian	Edmund Beaufort; Duke of Somerset; Lancastrian †1st St Albans	William Neville; Yorkist	Anne Neville	Henry Percy; Lancastrian †1st St Albans	Eleanor Neville	Richard Neville; Yorkist; (executed) Wakefield	Cecily Neville	Richard of York; Duke of York, Prince of Wales; Yorkist †Wakefield
Henry Beaufort; Duke of Somerset; Lancastrian; (executed) Hexham	Richard Woodville; (executed) Edgecote	Edmund Beaufort; Duke of Somerset; Lancastrian; (executed) Tewkesbury	Margaret Beaufort	Humphrey Stafford	Henry Percy; Lancastrian †Towton	John Neville; Yorkist, then Lancastrian †Barnet	Richard Neville "Kingmaker"; Yorkist, then Lancastrian †Barnet
Margaret Beaufort; Lancastrian	Edmund Tudor; Lancastrian	Jasper Tudor; Duke of Bedford; Lancastrian	Catherine Woodville	Henry Stafford; Duke of Buckingham; Yorkist, then Lancastrian (executed)	Elizabeth Woodville	Edward IV; Duke of York, King of England r. 1461–1470, r. 1471–1483; Yorkist	George Plantagenet; Duke of Clarence; Yorkist, then Lancastrian; (executed) Tower	Edward of Westminster; Prince of Wales; Lancastrian †Tewkesbury	Anne Neville	Richard III; Duke of Gloucester, King of England r. 1483–1485; Yorkist †Bosworth Field
Henry VII; King of England; Lancastrian r. 1485–1509	Elizabeth of York	Edward V Prince of Wales, King of England r. 1483; Yorkist; (executed) Tower	Richard of Shrewsbury; Duke of York; (executed) Tower

== Sources ==
- Ashdown-Hill, John (2014). The Third Plantagenet: George, Duke of Clarence, Richard III's Brother. Stroud: The History Press. ISBN 978-0-7524-9949-9. OCLC 873815303.
- Hicks, Michael (1992). False, Fleeting, Perjur'd Clarence: George, Duke of Clarence 1449–78 (rev. ed.). Bangor: Headstart History. ISBN 1-873041-08-X. OCLC 463748217.
- Kendall, Paul Murray (2002). Richard the Third. New York & London: W. W. Norton & Co. ISBN 978-0-393-34838-5. OCLC 1036805089 – via Internet Archive.
- Pollard, A. J. (1991). Richard III and the Princes in the Tower. Bramley Books. p. 65. ISBN 978-1-85833-772-2. OCLC 1036783280 – via Internet Archive.
- Weir, Alison (2002). Britain's Royal Family: A Complete Genealogy. Bodley Head. pp. 136–7. ISBN 0-7126-4286-2. OCLC 555656395.
