= Thomas Erpingham =

English soldier and administrator (c. 1357 – 1428)

Sir Thomas Erpingham KG
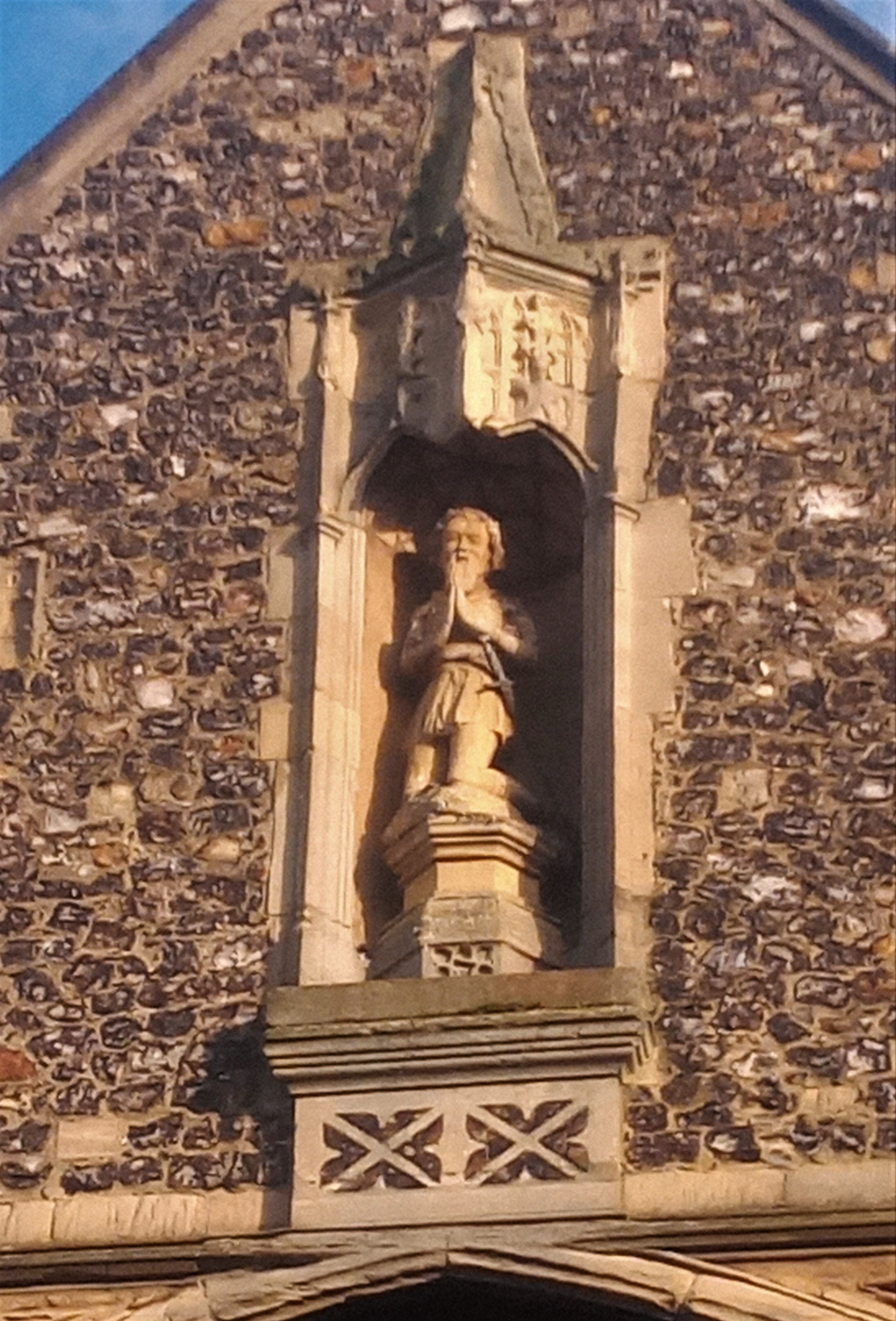
- Sir Thomas Erpingham's effigy (possibly taken from his tomb) in the Erpingham Gate, Norwich
- Born: c. 1357; Norfolk, England
- Died: 27 June 1428 (aged 70–71)
- Resting place: Norwich Cathedral; 52°37′55″N 1°18′4″E
- Monuments: Erpingham Gate, Norwich
- Occupations: Soldier, administrator
- Spouses: Joan Clopton; Joan Walton
- Father: Sir John de Erpingham

Sir Thomas Erpingham (c. 1357 – 27 June 1428) was an English soldier and administrator who loyally served three generations of the House of Lancaster, including Henry IV and Henry V, and whose military career spanned four decades. After the Lancastrian usurpation of the English throne in 1399, his career in their service was transformed as he rose to national prominence, and through his access to royal patronage he acquired great wealth and influence.

Erpingham was born in the English county of Norfolk, and knighted when a young man. During the reign of Richard II he served under the King's uncle John of Gaunt, Duke of Lancaster, in Spain and Scotland, and was with Gaunt's son Henry Bolingbroke on crusades in Lithuania, Prussia and the Holy Land. Erpingham accompanied Bolingbroke into exile in October 1398, and was with him when he landed at Ravenspur in July 1399 to reclaim his inheritance as Duke of Lancaster, after his lands had been forfeited by Richard. Bolingbroke rewarded Erpingham by appointing him as constable of Dover Castle and warden of the Cinque Ports, and after ascending the throne as Henry IV he made him chamberlain of the royal household. Erpingham later helped to suppress the Epiphany Rising and was appointed guardian of Henry's second son Thomas. He was a member of the Privy Council, acting at one point as marshal of England. He attempted to have Henry le Despenser, the anti-Lancastrian bishop of Norwich, impeached as a rebel.

On becoming king in 1413, Henry IV's son Henry of Monmouth appointed Erpingham as steward of the royal household. Henry IV's reign had been marked by lawlessness, but Henry V and his administrators proved to be unusually talented, and within twelve months law and order had been re-established throughout England. In 1415 Erpingham was indentured to serve as a knight banneret, and joined Henry's campaign to recover his lost ancestral lands in France and Normandy. Erpingham presided over the surrender of Harfleur. On 25 October 1415, he commanded the archers in the Battle of Agincourt, where he was positioned alongside the king.

Erpingham married twice, but both marriages were childless. He was a benefactor to the city of Norwich, where he had built the main cathedral gate which bears his name. He died on 27 June 1428, and was buried in Norwich Cathedral.

== Ancestry and early life ==
Thomas Erpingham was born in about 1357, the son of Sir John de Erpingham of Erpingham and Wickmere in Norfolk, England. His grandfather, Sir Robert de Erpingham was recorded as holding Erpingham manor in 1316 and Erpingham and Wickmere in 1346. (Note: Sir Thomas Erpingham was recorded as holding these two manors himself in 1401.) Sir Robert represented Norfolk in Parliaments during the 1330s and 1340s. In 1350, Sir Robert and his son Sir John de Erpingham both witnessed a deed of feoffment by Nicholas de Snyterle, rector of "Matelask" (Matlaske near Erpingham), to Philip Tynker and Maud his wife of a messuage there.

Sir John owned a house in Norwich in Conisford Lane, now King Street. Thomas, who would have known the house, was possibly born there. The identity of Erpingham's mother is not mentioned by his biographers. In September 1368 he may have travelled with his father to Aquitaine in the service of Edward the Black Prince.

His grandfather died in 1370, after 8 March but before 1 August, the date of death of the father of Thomas. On 8 March 1370 at Erpingham, Sir Robert de Erpingham and his son Sir John, both signed their names and left seals on a charter of an inescutcheon between eight martlets. In his will, Robert left legacies to all the friars of Norwich. He was buried near the south door of Erpingham church. Sir John de Erpingham succeeded his father Robert, but did not survive him long, dying later that same year on 1 August 1370. He was buried in the church at Erpingham in the east end of the south aisle.

== Early career ==
=== Early military service ===
Arms of Sir Thomas Erpingham

Erpingham served under William Ufford, 2nd Earl of Suffolk in 1372 and was with Suffolk in France the following year. In 1379 he was serving under the Captain of Calais, William Montagu, 2nd Earl of Salisbury. In the summer of 1380 he was indentured into the retinue of John of Gaunt, Duke of Lancaster, a military leader and the third surviving son of Edward III of England, with whom Salisbury had recently served. Indentured retainers gave their allegiance for life in a personal written contract—conditions of service and payment were agreed, and these were rarely relaxed. (Note: Indentured retainers first appeared in England at the end of the 13th century. There were three distinct types: resident household attendants; men bound by written indenture; and those who accepted fees and wore their lord's livery. The number of indentured retainers was probably never large. Most were expected to fight, in return for payment and compensation of costs, the lord receiving a share of the profits the retainer gained. The relationship was stable and strictly binding—obligations were rarely relaxed, and the allegiance was usually for life. A personal and voluntary contract was involved, conditions were agreed, and the payment of an annual fee was specified, the terms being written in two identical copies, and sealed by both parties. Most contracts stated that the indentured man could be summoned at any time; in the case of the Duke of Lancaster's contracts for instance, his retainers were to serve “wherever he will”, i.e. overseas. A freedom existed in their choice of each other, which served to ensure that the relationship was, according to the historian N.B. Lewis, “congenial enough to be enduring”)

The year Erpingham was knighted is unknown, but he is likely to have been at least 21. In June 1380 he was named as 'Sir Thomas' in an order of payment made by Lancaster, the earliest known date at which his knighthood is referred to. The payment, provided by the ducal manor of Gimingham, was for a considerable annual income of £20—it has been estimated that during the 15th century only 12,000 households in England had an income of between £10 and £300. Erpingham was with Lancaster during the English invasion of Scotland in 1385.

Lancaster's determination to rule the Kingdom of Castile after his marriage to the Castilian princess Constance in 1371 dominated his life for 15 years. In 1386 Richard II of England agreed to release the funds needed for Lancaster to lead a Castilian campaign. Lancaster's royal status gave him a prominence in affairs of state that created tension between him and Richard, and the cost of the Castilian campaign was seen by the King's advisers as a price worth paying for the political freedom Richard would gain from Lancaster's absence.

Erpingham was with Lancaster when his army set sail from Plymouth in July 1386. It landed at Brest, France, and temporarily relieved the besieged English garrison. After leaving Brest the army arrived at A Coruña, and went on to bring Galicia under English control. John I of Portugal joined with Lancaster in March 1387, but because of a lack of food for their animals, and the successful defensive tactics employed by the Castilians, their campaign was abandoned after six weeks. In 1388, Erpingham participated before Charles VI of France in a jousting tournament at Montereau, his adversary being Sir John de Barres. As related by the French chronicler Jean Froissart, half way through the tournament, Erpingham was struck violently on his shield by his opponent, and was knocked off his horse. Stunned by the blow, he managed to recover and continue the joust, "to the satisfaction of the king and his lords".

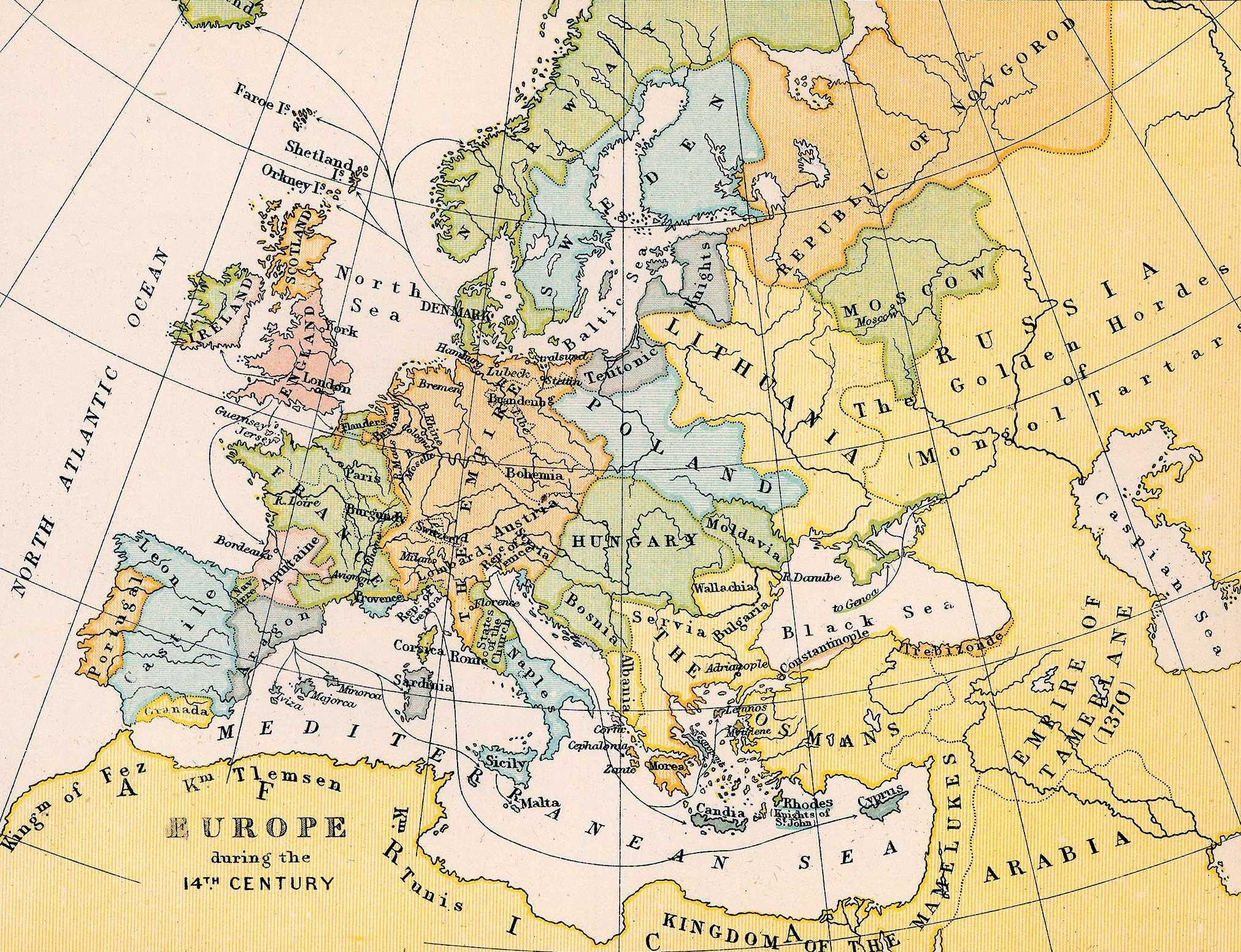
Erpingham travelled throughout Europe during his military career.

Erpingham was sent back to England to watch over Lancaster's son Henry Bolingbroke and went into his service. In 1390 he was with Bolingbroke's retinue when it crossed the English Channel with the intention of joining Duke Louis II of Bourbon in a siege of the Tunisian port of Mahdia on a crusading expedition via Marseille. The expedition was abandoned when Charles VI refused him permission to travel through France. Bolingbroke then went on a crusade in Lithuania. Erpingham, one of the most trusted and experienced of Lancaster's men, belonged to what the historian Douglas Biggs describes as "the 'adult' portion of Henry's force"—older men who were probably sent by Lancaster to guide and protect his son. The "crusade" resulted in an unsuccessful siege of Vilnius and the capture of Lithuanian women and children, who were then converted to Christianity. It is not known if Erpingham was present with Bolingbroke at the siege.

Erpingham was with Bolingbroke when he returned unnecessarily to Prussia in July 1392—a peace was being made in Lithuania between its ruler, Władysław II Jagiełło, and his cousin Vytautas, and the crusaders who had supported Vytautas had already left. Bolingbroke and his reduced retinue journeyed through Europe and the Near East, visiting Prague, Vienna, Corfu, and the Holy Land. It is thought that it was in Italy that Erpingham obtained the silk for the chasuble which bears his name, now in the Victoria and Albert Museum.

=== Revolution of 1399 ===
The historian Helen Castor has described the Lancastrian presence in East Anglia as a "disparate collection” that lacked coherence or a single identity. Erpingham rose to become the most important of Lancaster's retainers in the region. He was appointed to a commission of peace, and given powers to preserve order in Norfolk in the aftermath of the Peasants' Revolt in the summer of 1381. He had a part in supervising the defence of Norfolk in 1385, when a French invasion seemed imminent. In 1396 Lancaster granted him the legal right to use the land within the hundred of South Erpingham, a reward for his loyal service to the Duchy of Lancaster.

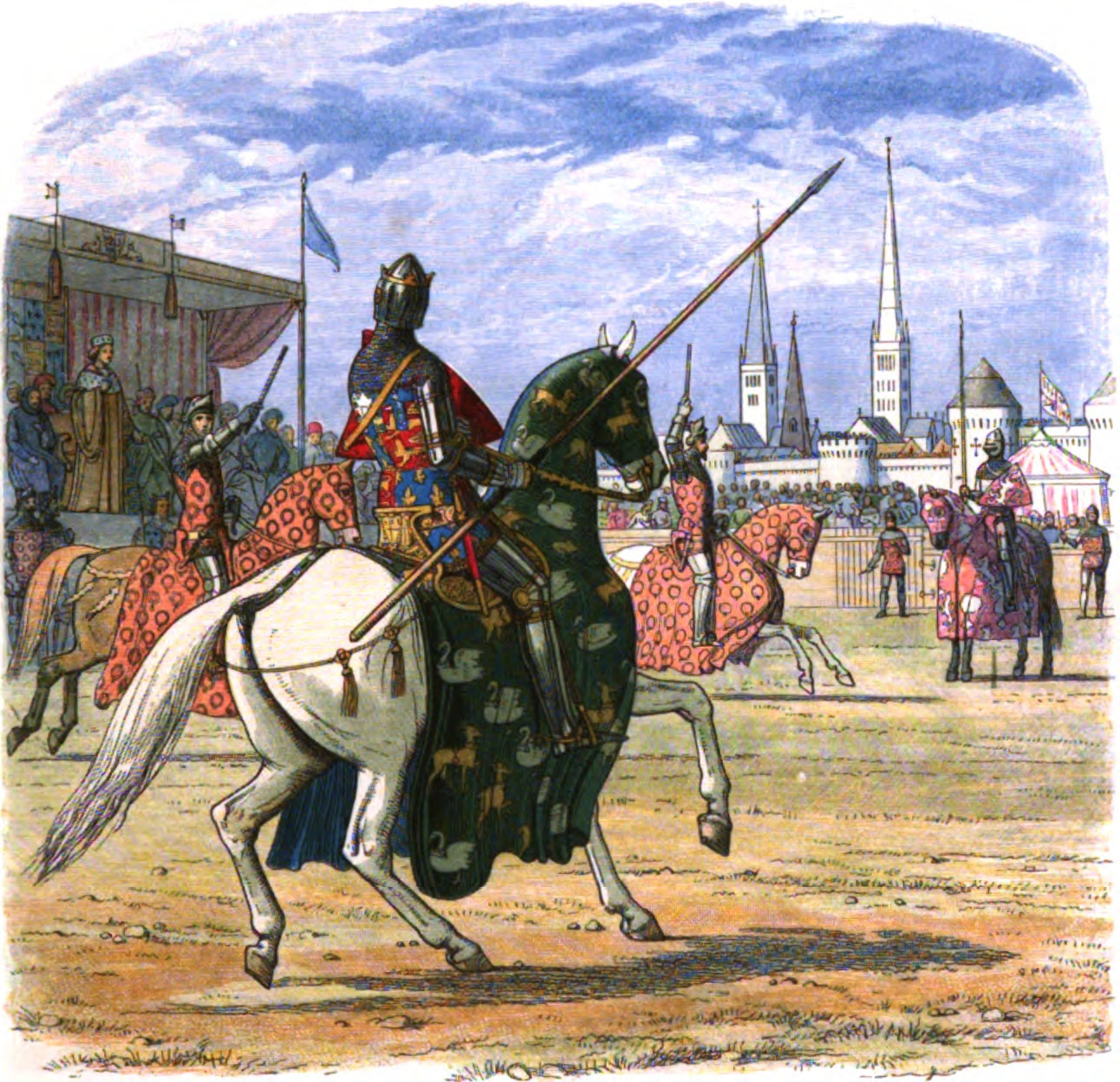
Richard II stops the trial by battle between Henry, Duke of Hereford and the Duke of Norfolk (The Chronicle of England (1864))

In January 1398 a dispute erupted between Bolingbroke and Thomas de Mowbray, 1st Duke of Norfolk, after Mowbray had attempted to ambush and kill Lancaster, and which the King ordered be settled by a trial by battle between the two men. During the five months before 16 September, the day the trial was due to take place, Bolingbroke travelled throughout England on a tour of the Lancastrian lands. Richard stopped the contest as it was about to begin and banished Bolingbroke from the kingdom for ten years, and exiled Mowbray for life. Those assembled were told that the trial had been stopped to avoid dishonouring the loser and to prevent a feud from arising, but chroniclers (writing after Henry IV's accession) considered Richard's decision an act of revenge. Bolingbroke, as one of the five Lords Appellant, had rebelled in November 1387; for a year they maintained Richard as a figurehead with little actual power. (Note: The Lords Appellant were five nobles who rebelled against Richard II. In November 1387, the Duke of Gloucester, the Earl of Arundel, and the Earl of Warwick together declared the Appeal of Treason, a set of charges of treason against five men close to the King, with the aim of bringing them to trial. Gloucester, Arundel and Warwick were later joined by Henry Bolingbroke and Thomas de Mowbray, 4th Earl of Norfolk. At Huntingdon the Appellants—named after the Appeal of Treason—decided to act against the King's favourite Robert de Vere. At the Battle of Radcot Bridge near Oxford, de Vere's forces were defeated, and he was forced to flee abroad. During the Merciless Parliament of February to June 1388, the Appellants orchestrated a period of bloodletting against the King's courtiers, which Richard, deprived of his authority to rule for a year, was powerless to oppose. By May 1389 the alliance the Appellants had made was fractured and Richard had regained power; over the next decade he was able to exact his revenge against all five rebels.)

Erpingham was one of 17 named companions who volunteered to accompany Henry Bolingbroke into exile. He entrusted his lands and property to Sir Robert Berney and others. (Note: Berney, who lived at Gunton, was Erpingham's neighbour in North Norfolk. They fought together in the retinue of John of Gaunt, and were discharged from the commission of array in Norfolk, when Gaunt marched with Richard II's army to Scotland in 1385. Erpingham appointed Berney as the deputy constable of Dover Castle in 1400. Berney remained there until he was replaced by Sir Andrew Butler in 1406.) The party headed for Paris, where they were welcomed by Charles VI and presented with lavish gifts. Following the death of his father on 3 February 1399, Bolingbroke's inheritance was confiscated by Richard, and his banishment was increased by the King to life. On 17 June 1399, Erpingham witnessed a secret pact made in Paris between Bolingbroke and Louis I, Duke of Orléans, the brother of Charles VI, stating that as allies they would support each other against each other's enemies—the kings of England and France excepted.

Erpingham was one of Bolingbroke's supporters who landed with him at Ravenspur, probably at the end of June 1399. Whilst Bolingbroke was gaining support for his cause to restore his rightful inheritance of the Duchy of Lancaster as he moved across northern and central England, Richard was delayed in Ireland. He eventually found ships to cross the Irish Sea, and reached Wales by around 24 July 1399. Realising the strength of the threat posed by his rival, he deserted his court and moved across country with a small group of followers.

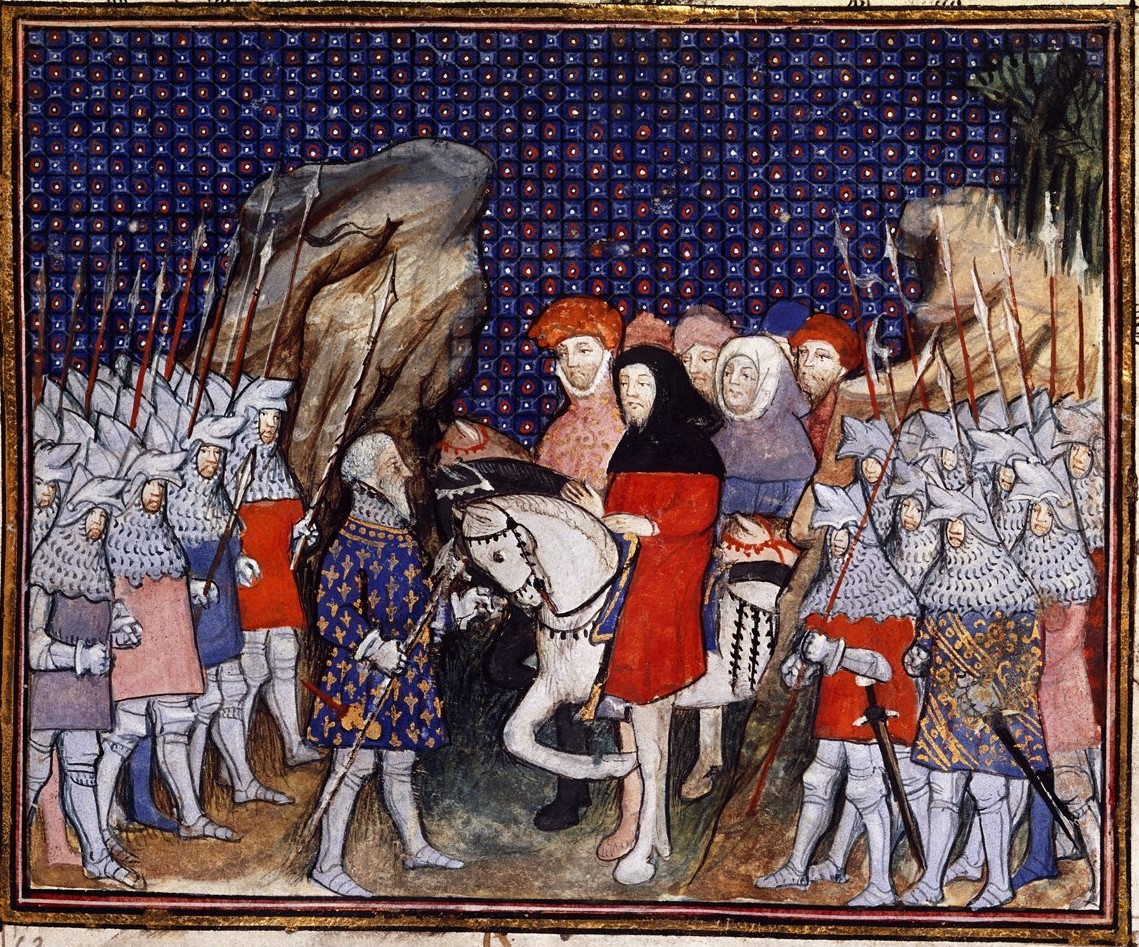
Richard II met by his enemies—led by Erpingham—after the King was lured by the Earl of Northumberland from Conwy Castle (British Library)

By 27 July 1399 Bolingbroke had reached Berkeley, near Bristol, where he had a meeting with Richard's uncle the Duke of York. At Berkeley, York deserted the King's cause and joined Bolingbroke. Shortly afterwards, Erpingham arrested Henry le Despenser, bishop of Norwich and one of the few remaining supporters of Richard prepared to resist Bolingbroke.

Richard had reached Conwy Castle when Chester fell to Bolingbroke on 5 August. The King was persuaded by the Earl of Northumberland to leave Conwy and travel 17 miles (27 km) to Rhuddlan Castle, but during the journey his party was ambushed and he was taken prisoner. According to a French chronicle, the ambush was devised by Northumberland and carried out by his men, led by Erpingham. When Richard saw armed men everywhere, Northumberland's plans were revealed to him, and: "As he spoke, Erpingham came up with all the people of the Earl, his trumpets sounding aloud." Taken to London under armed guard and kept under Erpingham's custody in the Tower of London, Richard was given no option by Bolingbroke and his representatives—including Erpingham—but to relinquish the throne.

Erpingham was given two important positions at court by Bolingbroke. He was made lord warden and constable of Dover Castle as early as 21 August, and appointed to be chamberlain of the royal household after Henry's accession, a post which made him the head of the royal household with overall responsibility for the arrangement of Henry's domestic affairs, and which he held until 1404. His appointment as lord warden and constable involved the command of a garrison at the castle, and gave Erpingham a position in the King's council when strategic matters were discussed; as constable, he was paid over £300 a year.

== Career under Henry IV ==
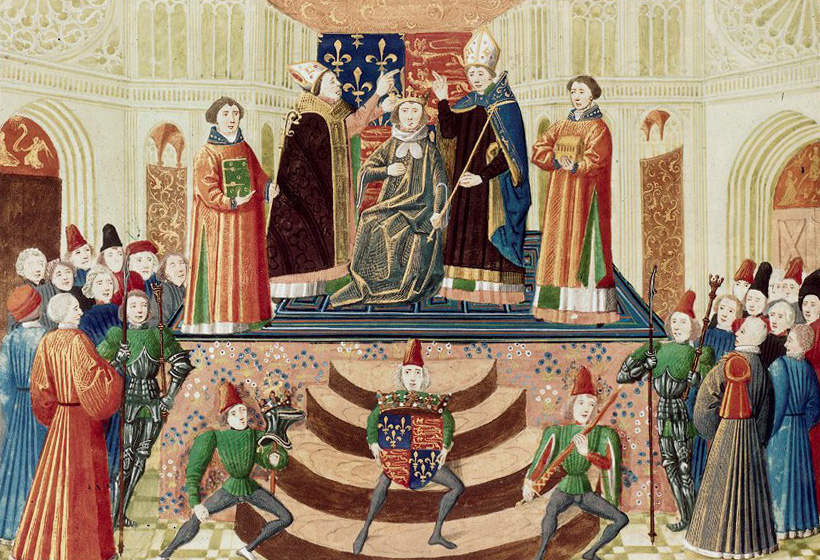
The coronation of Henry IV, from Froissart's Chronicles (British Library)

Henry's coronation took place on 13 October 1399 at Westminster Abbey. As part of the ceremony, Erpingham carried one of the King's swords during the procession to the abbey. He was one of 11 men who petitioned Henry in person to have Richard killed. (Note: According to a contemporary French chronicle, translated by Benjamin Williams in 1846, the men included an archbishop and a duke.) He was a commander in the army that suppressed the Epiphany Rising of 1399–1400, led by the duketti (the disparaging term given to a large group of noblemen, many of whom had received titles from Richard). Erpingham supervised the execution of two of the leading rebels, Sir Thomas Blount and Sir Benedict Kely. As Blount watched his own bowels being burnt before him, he cursed Erpingham for being a "false traitor":

Art thou the traitor Erpingham? Thou art more false than I am or ever was; and thou liest, false knight as though art . . . thou utterest thy false spleen like a false and disloyal traitor; for by thee, and by the false traitor, the Earl of Rutland, the noble knighthood of England is destroyed. Cursed be the hour when thou and he were born.

Henry rewarded Erpingham with the custody for life of a house called 'le Newe Inne' in London. The following year, Erpingham was appointed as guardian of the King's second son, Thomas, Duke of Clarence, and in about 1401 he was appointed to the Order of the Garter. (Note: The stall plates of some of the knights of the Garter created before 1415, including that of Erpingham, can be seen in the quire of St George's Chapel, Windsor Castle.) He acted briefly as steward of the royal household the same year and became acting marshal of England in October. In July 1407 the Duke of Burgundy was authorised to negotiate a permanent peace settlement between the French and the English. A mission led by Erpingham went to Paris the following month, and were lavishly entertained by members of the French king's council.

Despite the military nature of the office of constable of Dover, Erpingham took little part in the warfare of the early years of Henry IV's reign, and he generally remained at court. He campaigned in Scotland in August 1400, when Henry made a futile attempt to make the Scots acknowledge him as king of England and pay him homage.

According to one tradition, Erpingham was a supporter of John Wycliffe's English translation of the Bible, which was considered heretical. Supposedly, Erpingham was spared from persecution by the Church because he was favoured by Henry IV, and so merely paid a fine, which financed the construction of the Erpingham Gate. The historian Veronica Sekules considers it unlikely that Erpingham supported Wycliffe, and suggests that if he had such a dispute with the Church, it was more likely over Erpingham's arrest of Despenser.

=== Power and influence in Norfolk ===
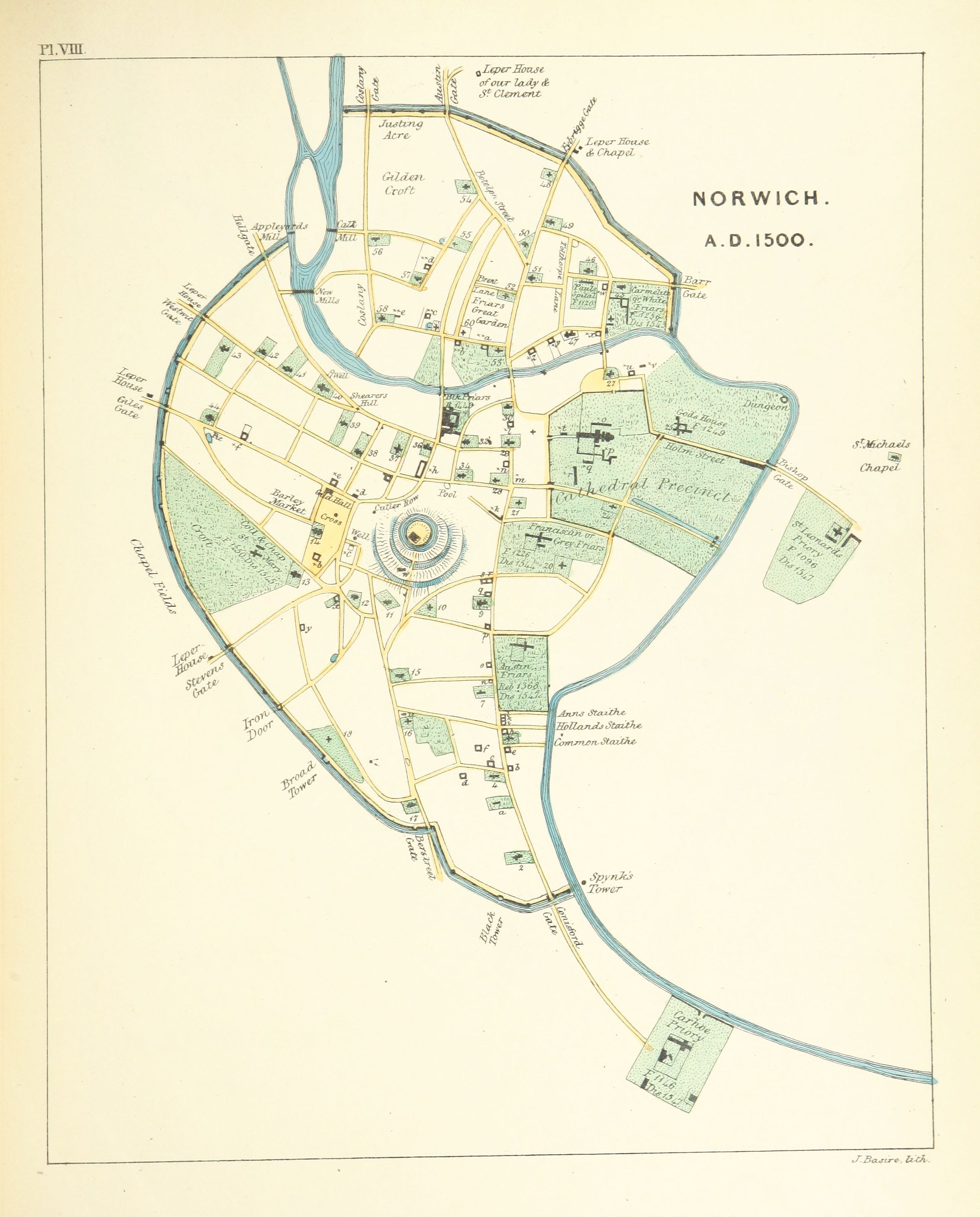
On this map of medieval Norwich, from Samuel Woodward's The History and Antiquities of Norwich Castle (1847), Erpingham's city house is marked *u.

Sir Thomas Erpingham was one of Henry IVs closest associates, and after 1399, influence in Norfolk shifted from Despenser to Erpingham and his friends. Due to his local connections, his links with the Duchy of Lancaster and his position in the centre of government, Erpingham held a prominent position in East Anglian society; he was named to every commission of the peace in Norfolk during the reign of Henry IV. During the 1400s, Erpingham's authority in north Norfolk was extended to other parts of the county and into Suffolk. Gentry from East Anglia who were associated with Erpingham benefited from his powerful position at court: Sir John Strange of Hunstanton became controller of the royal household in 1408; Sir Robert Gurney of Gunton became Erpingham's deputy at Dover Castle in 1400; and John Winter of Barningham became controller of Prince Henry's household in 1403. Other beneficiaries of Erpingham's friendship included Sir Ralph Shelton, John Payn, and John Raynes of Overstrand, who succeeded Payn as the constable of Norwich Castle in 1402.

The principal citizens of Norwich had become disillusioned with Richard II's policies, the city having lost its charter in 1388 when it supported the Lords Appellant. Despenser had remained within his diocese after Henry's coronation, but his nephew Thomas Despenser, 1st Earl of Gloucester had been executed for his part in the Epiphany Rising. Erpingham attempted to have Despenser impeached for actively supporting the rebels; at Erpingham's suggestion, Norwich petitioned Henry with charges against Despenser, which were presented to the King by Erpingham.

At Despenser's hearing in London, Erpingham was publicly congratulated by the King for his loyalty to the Crown. Despenser was forced to accept Henry's authority and publicly rebuked; he was later pardoned. Henry awarded the city a new charter, and Norwich showed its gratitude by showering Erpingham with lavish gifts "for bearing his word to the King for the honour of the city and for having his counsel". The city authorities cooperated with him as an important member of Henry's inner circle.

== Career under Henry V ==
Henry IV died at Westminster on 30 March 1413, and was succeeded by his son Henry of Monmouth, the Prince of Wales. Monmouth had replaced Erpingham as warden of the Cinque Ports in 1409, but relationships between the two men remained good, and after the coronation on 9 April 1413, Erpingham was appointed steward of the household, a post he held until at least 1415. (Note: He held the post until 10 May 1417; but according to the historian Ian Mortimer, he was replaced by Walter Hungerford on 24 July 1415.) After Henry IV's reign, which had been marked by banditry and rioting, Henry V acted quickly to restore law and order throughout the country. This was achieved within a year. Henry's administrators—Erpingham included—were unusually talented, and order was maintained in England throughout his reign.

Henry's great-grandfather Edward III had lost Aquitaine in 1337 when it was confiscated from the English by Philip VI of France, and as a grandson of Philip IV of France, Edward had a claim to the French throne. In November 1414, Henry launched a campaign to recover Aquitaine and France. It was an effective way of establishing his authority as king at the start of his reign. Strategic planning for the expedition in February 1415 involved discussions with Erpingham and other soldiers in Henry's inner circle, part of what the historian Anne Curry describes as the King's "strong infrastructure and amply supply of manpower". Erpingham was indentured to serve as a knight banneret. His retinue, which mustered on heathland outside Southampton where they obtained provisions, consisted of two knights, 17 squires and 60 archers.

=== Participation at Harfleur and Agincourt ===
Places featured in Henry V's campaign of 1415–1416

Erpingham crossed over from England to Normandy with Henry's army on 11 August 1415. The King's ship reached the mouth of the River Seine on 13 August, and the army landed 3 miles (5 km) from Harfleur, a landing point likely to have been decided on beforehand. Erpingham's men were present during the siege of the town, and on 22 September he led the procession to the walls and presided over the truce that led to its surrender. The English army then marched towards Calais, shadowed by the French, who forced them to divert away from the coast. The English successfully forded the River Somme at Voyennes; two days' march short of Calais, they were blocked by the French near Agincourt.

Erpingham was one of the middle-aged English commanders on the field at Agincourt, and at 60 was one of the oldest men present. Although having never experienced a pitched battle before, he had taken part in lesser actions and, as noted by Curry, was "undoubtedly one of the most experienced soldiers present" at Agincourt. He is not mentioned in any contemporaneous English versions of the battle, but three French chroniclers, Jean de Wavrin, Enguerrand de Monstrelet and Jean Le Fèvre, all give detailed descriptions of his role in the battle. The three main divisions (or 'battles') of the English army were commanded by Henry and two veteran soldiers: the rearguard (to the right of the King) was led by Thomas Camoys, 1st Baron Camoys; and the vanguard (on the King's left) was led by Edward, Duke of York.

==== The battle ====
On 25 October, the day of the battle, the English army was in position by dawn. With both of its flanks protected by the woods of Tramecourt and Azincourt, the army consisted of 5,000 archers and 800 dismounted men-at-arms—in proportion to the number of men-at-arms present, the number of English archers was high. Because of the authority his seniority would carry, Erpingham was given command of the archers. The men-at-arms were positioned fours ranks deep in the centre of the gap between the two woods. Most of the archers were positioned on the flanks of the men-at-arms, but a few archers were placed amongst them, and 200 were hidden in a clearing in the Tramecourt woods, close to the French lines. (Note: The story of the concealed archers was denied by Le Fèvre.) Each archer had a stake, double-pointed and 6 feet (1.8 m) long, which was planted deep into the ground and—according to an eye-witness account—"sloping towards the enemy higher than a man's waist above the ground". The stakes gave protection against a charge by the French cavalry.

... the King of England, who had appointed a knight called Sir Thomas Erpingham to place his archers in front in two wings, trusted entirely to him, and Sir Thomas, to do his part, exhorted every one to do well in the name of the king, begging them to fight vigorously against the French in order to secure and save their own lives. And thus the knight, who rode with two others only in front of the battalion, seeing that the hour was come, for all things were well arranged, threw up a baton which he held in his hand, saying " Nestrocq," which was the signal for attack; then dismounted and joined the king, who was also on foot in the midst of his men, with his banner before him.

— Jean de Wavrin (c.1400 – c.1474), Recueil des chroniques d'Angleterre, translated by Sir William Hardy and Edward L.C.P. Hardy (1887)

After the French army failed to attack, Erpingham was ordered to warn the army that it was about to advance to within bowshot of the French. He threw his baton upwards as a signal to advance, and commanded "Now strike!". Erpingham's strong Norfolk accent may have caused the French to mishear him, as some chroniclers recorded the command as "Nestroque". (Note: Other interpretations of his command are "Now stretch", "knee stretch" or "I do know what". The command is variously written sciecque, nestrotque and nestroque by French historians'.) He then dismounted and moved with his banner to join the King, where he remained during the rest of the battle.

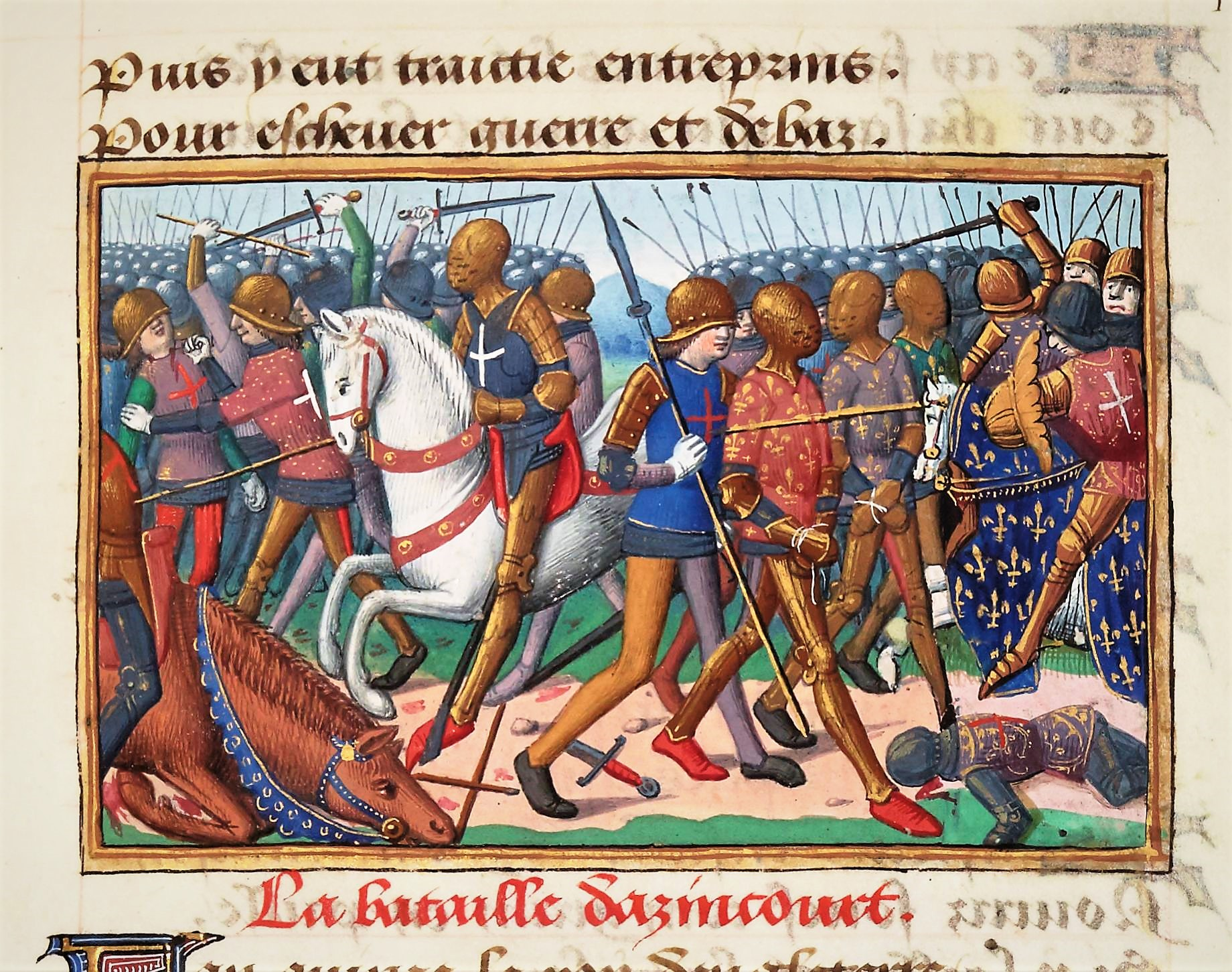
The Battle of Agincourt, from Martial d'Auvergne's Vigils of Charles VII (c.1484)

When the English advanced with a great shout, the French responded by beginning their own advance, each army moving roughly the same distance. The English paused and the main body of archers replanted their stakes. They then began to continuously discharge their arrows, which signalled the concealed archers to start firing into the French flanks. The French plan was to use mounted men-at-arms to overcome the English archers, leaving the battles and the men in the wings to attack their heavily outnumbered English counterparts. This plan failed when the cavalry were halted by the storm of arrow fire and the stakes planted by the archers; their retreat was disrupted by the advancing French foot soldiers. The chaos that ensued allowed the English men-at-arms to penetrate the French battles.

The ensuing melee was the most important part of the battle. Once the men-at-arms in the two armies engaged, the English archers fired into the flanks of the French. Evidence suggests the English vanguard, led by York, who was killed, bore most of the fighting. Advancing through deep mud, the French were exhausted when they reached the English. Those killed or knocked down at the front hindered others behind them, causing men to pile up. The immobilised French were killed where they stood, the English suffering far fewer casualties. Any of the French attempting to retreat were blocked by their advancing comrades; if they tried to move to the flanks they were targets for the English archers. At this stage in the mêlée, the archers abandoned their bows and attacked the flanks of the mass of the French with any weapons to hand. This, and their failing position to their front, caused the French to break, and many were cut down or captured by pursuing English archers and men-at-arms. Not all the French had engaged in the fighting and only the vanguard had been defeated. When much of the main French battle were destroyed by the English men-at-arms and the re-armed archers firing into them, the largely leaderless French army withdrew from the field, except for a group of 600 men who were killed or captured when they charged the English.

==== Aftermath of the battle ====
After the battle, Henry's army marched to the English enclave of the Pale of Calais, embarked from Calais on 16 November and returned to England. Erpingham was among 300 men-at arms—which included four barons and 22 knights—and 900 archers who garrisoned the town over the winter. The seniority of the men-at-arms was a reflection of how important it was to Henry that the town was not lost to the French.

On his return to England, Erpingham's reward for the services he rendered had during the war included the farm of Lessingham manor and an annuity from the King of 50 marks. (Note: A medieval English mark was an accounting unit equivalent to two-thirds of a pound sterling.) In July 1416, in his capacity as the steward of the royal household, he travelled back to Calais with John Wakering, the bishop of Norwich. There they welcomed the Duke of Burgundy, before his meeting with King Henry.

== Personal life ==
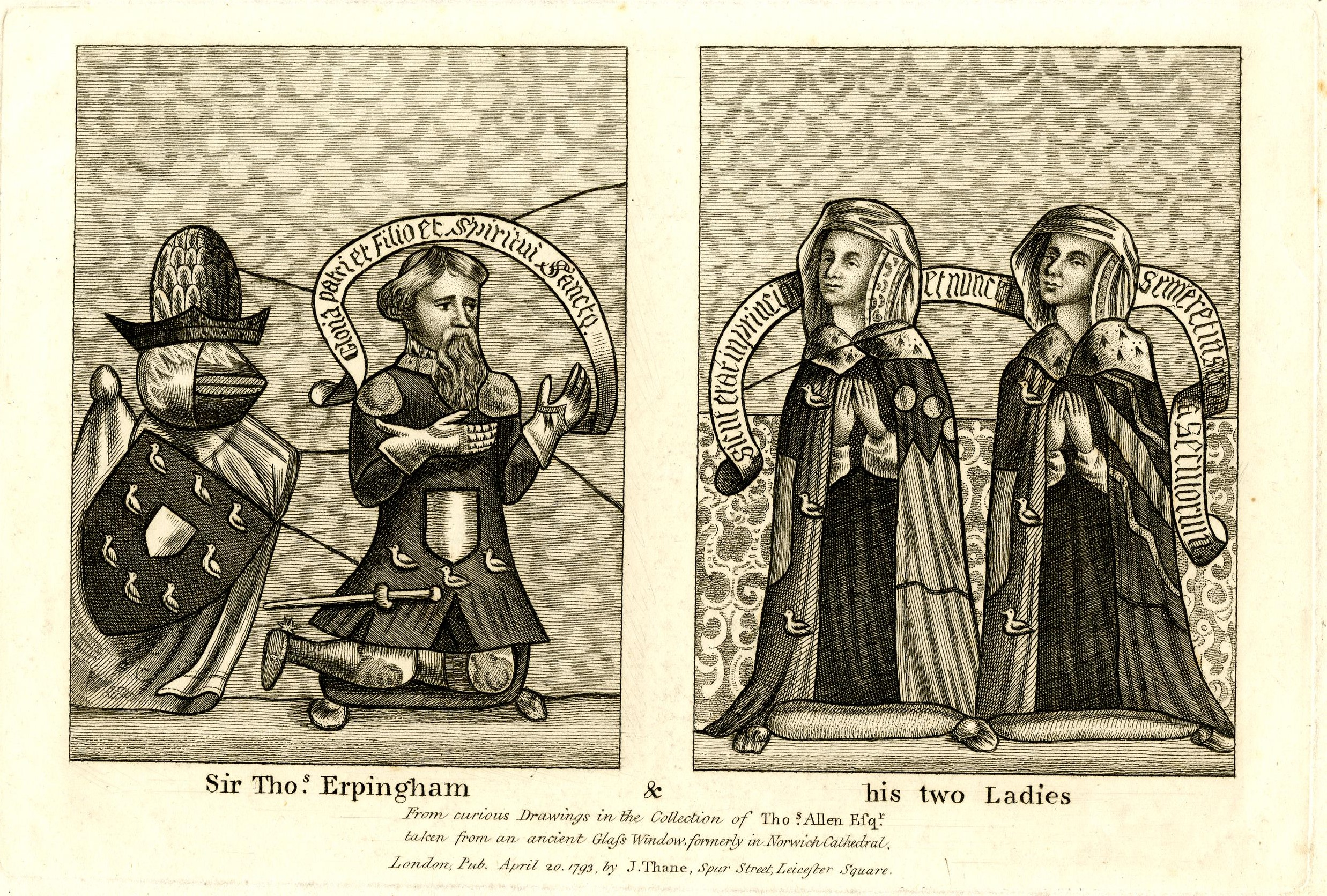
Sir Thomas Erpingham with his two wives

When staying in Norwich, Erpingham and his family and servants lived in a large house located between Norwich Cathedral and the River Wensum, with his land going down to the river. The house was acquired from Sir Robert Berney in 1409. Known variously as 'Berney's Inn', 'the Erpingham' or 'Calthorpe's House', it was only accurately located in 1981. No remains survive, although it was a major source of employment for the local area during the time that it was occupied by Erpingham. It was inherited by his niece. In the 17th century, the house and its associated land was subdivided and built upon.

Erpingham's connections with the Lancastrians and his increasing wealth led to his acquisition of lands, rents and services in Norfolk, Suffolk and Essex, manors sometimes being held in joint possession with his neighbours or relatives. Curry lists over 40 manors he held during his life, some permanently: three were inherited from his father, such as the manor at Erpingham; seven came to him during the 1370s and 1380s; eight manors were given to him in 1399 by Henry IV and a further seven were acquired that year by other means; another seven were acquired during the 1400s; and he purchased twelve manors from 1410 to 1421. He also lost the tenure of some of his lands, a common occurrence at the time when manors were awarded 'for life'; the hundred, which included his home village, was lost in 1398, when King Richard gave to Katherine Swynford, third wife of the Duke of Lancaster, "the manors of Erpingham and Wyckmere, and of all lands, rents, services, villeins with their villeinages etc. there and in all other towns in Norfolk sometime of Robert Erpingham knight". In 1407 Berney helped Erpingham to buy the manor at Blickling. His family sold Blickling to the soldier Sir John Fastolf in 1431.

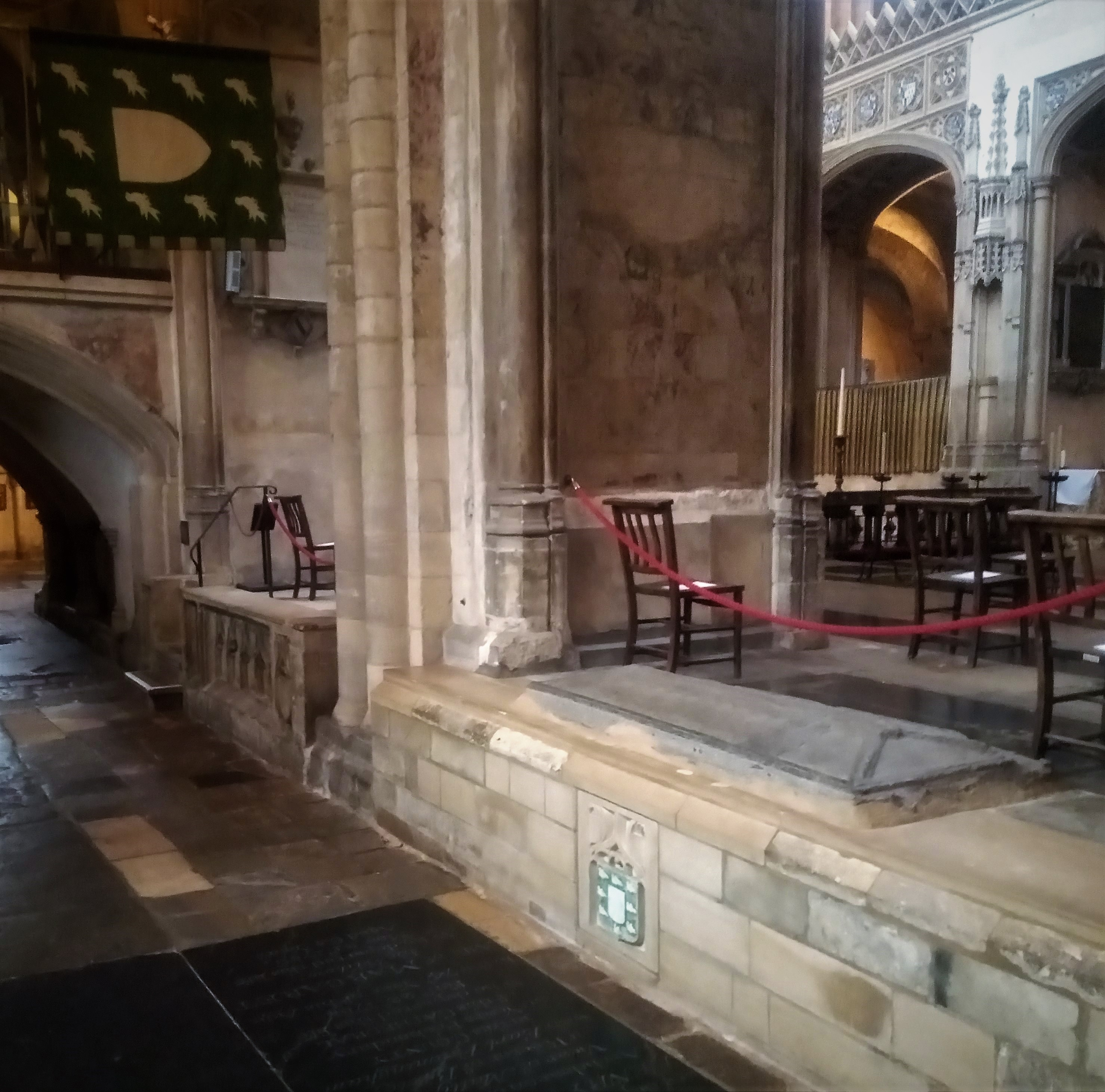
Erpingham's tomb in Norwich Cathedral

Erpingham married Joan Clopton, the daughter of Sir William Clopton of Clopton, Suffolk, sometime before 1389; Erpingham was widowed in 1404. His second marriage was to Joan Walton, the daughter of Sir Richard Walton, and widow of Sir John Howard, who died in 1409 or 1410. Joan died in 1425. Both marriages were childless.

Erpingham had a profound influence on the careers of the two sons of his sister Julian, who married Sir William Phelip (or Philip) of Dennington. Erpingham's position in court helped the elder son William to become a member of Henry IV's personal household; William's brother John held a similar position at the court of Henry of Monmouth. The brothers remained closely attached to their uncle. William and Erpingham were often recorded as co-feoffees of estates in East Anglia, and William stood surety for his uncle at the Exchequer. The family's fortunes improved still further when Henry of Monmouth became king, although John died at Harfleur in 1415. His brother was knighted on the eve of the coronation and later fought at Agincourt.

From 1417, Erpingham seems to have retired and lived out his remaining years in Norfolk, having relinquished his position as steward that May. King Henry died in 1422, after which Erpingham had no further contact with the court. He died on 27 June 1428, and was buried at Norwich Cathedral. Sir William Phelip, who was an executor of his uncle's will, "inherited his substantial possessions in Norfolk". Dated 25 March 1427, the will contains bequests to Norwich Cathedral, churches in Norfolk and London, two Norwich hospitals and several East Anglian convents. Erpingham specified that "all my armour and the harness of my person to be delivered up to the Holy Trinity [Cathedral] in Norwich".

== Architectural legacy ==
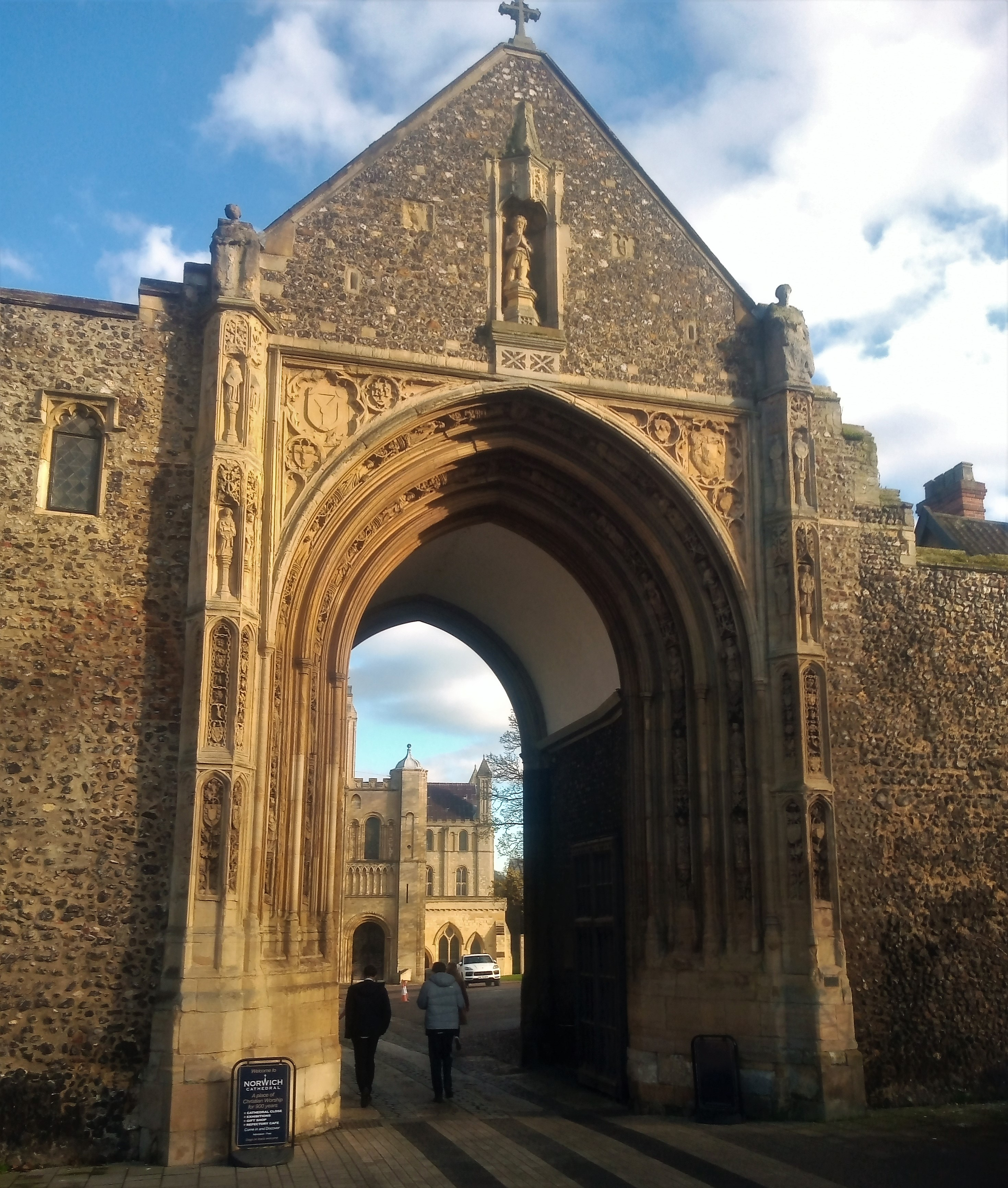
Erpingham Gate (Norwich Cathedral)

He funded the rebuilding of the Church of the Blackfriars in Norwich after a fire in the city caused serious damage to the original friary complex in 1413. Today it forms part of the most complete friary surviving in England. The west tower of St. Mary's Church, in the village of Erpingham, was paid for by him.

In 1419, Erpingham paid for the east chancel window of the church of St. Austin's Friary in Norwich to be glazed. The window contained eight panes, containing dedications to 107 noblemen or knights who died without producing an heir since the reign of Edward III. The building was demolished in 1547 after the priory was suppressed in 1538.

== Appearance in the Henriad ==
Sir Thomas Erpingham appears twice in Act IV of William Shakespeare's play Henry V, first printed in 1600, and is mentioned (but does not appear) in Act II of Richard II. According to the Shakespearean scholar Thomas M. Cranfill, Erpingham plays a "considerable, affecting role". Just after the beginning of Scene 1, Erpingham enters and is acknowledged by the King. As the old man departs, Henry replies (probably out of Erpingham's hearing), "God-a-mercy, old heart! thou speak'st cheerfully", a line, as historian Lawrence Danson writes, "poised at gratitude and irony, admiration and desperation": Later in the same scene, Erpingham re-enters to inform the King that his nobles are looking for him, and in a simple line conveys the burden of being a ruler. Erpingham is a counterpart to the character of John Falstaff, his brief appearance in the Henriad contrasting with the much larger part given to Falstaff. Henry emphasises the knight's old age and marks him apart by consistently referring him by his full name, and the character is used to accentuate the connection between old age and goodness.

In film depictions of the play, Erpingham's part is largely silent, as in Laurence Olivier's film of 1944. Erpingham first appears near the end of the film, during the night before the battle of Agincourt. Kenneth Branagh, in his 1989 film, used the character more often and in, according to Curry, in a way that was "notably more inventive" than Olivier and showed more of an awareness of Erpingham's place in history. Identifiable in both films by his distinctive coat of arms and his white hair—in contrast with that of the youthful looking Henry and his courtiers—Branagh includes Erpingham to good effect in the court scenes set in England, as well as during the battle and its aftermath. The character is given a more central (if largely silent) role by Branagh, without distorting Shakespeare's original intentions for the part.

== Sources ==
- Allington-Smith, R. (2003). Henry Despenser: the Fighting Bishop. Dereham: Larks Press. ISBN 978-1-904006-16-9.
- Ayers, Brian (1981). "Excavations at St Martin-at-Palace Plain, Norwich". East Anglian Archaeology (EAA 37). Oxford: Oxbow Books. ISSN 0307-2460.
- Barker, Juliet R.V. (2006). Agincourt: Henry V and the Battle that made England. New York: Little, Brown and Co. ISBN 978-0-316-01504-2.
- Bennett, Matthew (2000). "The Battle". In Curry, Anne (ed.). Agincourt 1415: Henry V, Sir Thomas Erpingham and the Triumph of the English Archers. Stroud: Tempus Publishing Ltd. pp. 21–36. ISBN 978-0-7524-1780-6.
- Biggs, Douglas (2006). Three armies in Britain: the Irish campaign of Richard II and the usurpation of Henry IV, 1397–1399. History of Warfare. Vol. 39. Leiden: Brill. OCLC 1200872544. Archived from the original on 17 May 2021.
- Brown, A.L.; Summerson, Henry (2004). "Henry IV [known as Henry Bolingbroke]". Oxford Dictionary of National Biography (online ed.). Oxford: Oxford University Press. doi:10.1093/ref:odnb/12951. OCLC 56568095. (Subscription, Wikipedia Library access or UK public library membership required.)
- Castor, Helen (2004). The King, the Crown, and the Duchy of Lancaster: Public Authority and Private Power, 1399–1461. Oxford: Oxford University Press. ISBN 978-0-19-820622-4.
- Cranfill, Thomas M. (1973). "Shakespeare's Old Heroes". Texas Studies in Literature and Language. 15 (2). Austin: University of Texas Press: 215–230. JSTOR 40755212. Archived from the original on 17 May 2021.
- Curry, Anne (2000). "Sir Thomas Erpingham: A Life in Arms". In Curry, Anne (ed.). Agincourt 1415: Henry V, Sir Thomas Erpingham and the Triumph of the English Archers. Stroud: Tempus Publishing Ltd. pp. 53–110. ISBN 978-0-7524-1780-6.
- Curry, Anne (2015). 1415 Agincourt: a New History (2nd ed.). Stroud: The History Press. ISBN 978-07509-6-486-9. Archived from the original on 27 June 2024.
- Curry, Anne; Bell, Adrian; King, Andy; Simpkin, David (2010). "New Regime, New Army? Henry IV's Scottish Expedition of 1400". The English Historical Review. 125 (517). Oxford: Oxford University Press: 1382–1413. doi:10.1093/ehr/ceq343. JSTOR 40963191. Archived from the original on 17 May 2021.
- Danson, Lawrence (1983). "Henry V: King, Chorus, and Critics". Shakespeare Quarterly. 34 (1). Oxford: Oxford University Press: 27–43. doi:10.2307/2870218. ISSN 0037-3222. JSTOR 2870218. Archived from the original on 17 May 2021.
- Dyer, Christopher (2002). Standards of Living in the Later Middle Ages: Social Change in England c. 1200–1520. Cambridge: Cambridge University Press. ISBN 978-05212-7-215-5. Archived from the original on 27 June 2024.
- Froissart, John (1862) [early 15th century]. Chronicles of England, France, Spain, and the Adjoining Countries, from the Latter Part of the Reign of Edward II to the Coronation of Henry IV. Vol. 2. Translated by Johnes, Thomas. London: George Routledge and Sons. OCLC 702684791.
- Given-Wilson, Chris (2017). Henry IV. New Haven: Yale University Press. ISBN 978-0-300-22971-4.
- Goodman, Anthony (1987). "John of Gaunt: Paradigm of the Late Fourteenth-Century Crisis". Transactions of the Royal Historical Society. 37. Cambridge: Cambridge University Press: 133–148. doi:10.1017/S0080440100018892. ISSN 0080-4401. JSTOR 3679154. Archived from the original on 8 January 2021.
- Harding, V. (2002). The Dead and the Living in Paris and London, 1500–1670. Cambridge: Cambridge University Press. ISBN 978-0-521-81126-2.
- Hinsley, Mark (2015). "Playing for high stakes: the archer's stake and the battle of Agincourt" (PDF). The Historian. No. 127. London: The Historical Association. pp. 30–34. Archived (PDF) from the original on 25 September 2020.
- John, Trevor (1970). "Sir Thomas Erpingham, East Anglian Society and the Dynastic Revolution of 1399". Norfolk Archaeology. 35 (1). Norfolk: Norfolk and Norwich Archaeological Society: 96–108. doi:10.5284/1078024. ISSN 0142-7962. Archived from the original on 27 June 2024.
- Lewis, N.B. (1945). "The Organisation of Indentured Retinues in Fourteenth-Century England". Transactions of the Royal Historical Society. 27. Cambridge: Cambridge University Press: 29–39. doi:10.2307/3678573. ISSN 0080-4401. JSTOR 3678573. S2CID 163031246. Archived from the original on 22 January 2021.
- Mortimer, Ian (2007). The Fears of King Henry IV: the Life of England's Self-made King. London: Vintage Books. ISBN 978-1-4070-6633-2. Archived from the original on 27 June 2024.
- Mortimer, Ian (2009). Henry V: The Warrior King of 1415. London: Bodley Head. ISBN 978-0-224-07992-1.
- Mourin, Ken (2000). "Norwich, Norfolk and Sir Thomas Erpingham". In Curry, Anne (ed.). Agincourt 1415: Henry V, Sir Thomas Erpingham and the Triumph of the English Archers. Stroud: Tempus Publishing Ltd. pp. 78–90. ISBN 978-0-7524-1780-6.
- Norfolk Archaeology (1921). "Proceedings, 1921. Includes accounts of Elsing Hall, Melton Constable Hall, Aylsham church, Felbrigg Hall, and Blickling Hall". Transactions of the Norfolk and Norwich Archaeological Society. 21 (2): xix–xxxix. ISSN 0142-7962. Archived from the original on 27 June 2024.
- Pollard, A. (1901). "Thomas Erpingham" . In Lee, Sidney (ed.). Dictionary of National Biography (1st supplement). Vol. 2. London: Smith, Elder & Co. pp. 189–190.
- Father Roth (1965). "A History of the English Austin Friars". Augustiniana. 15. Peeters Publishers. ISSN 0004-8003. JSTOR 44992012. Archived from the original on 17 May 2021.
- Rye, Walter (1925). Some historical essays chiefly relating to Norfolk. Vol. 2. Norwich: H.W. Hunt. OCLC 5803809. Archived from the original on 17 May 2021.
- Saul, Nigel (1999). Richard II. New Haven: Yale University Press. ISBN 978-0-300-07875-6. Archived from the original on 27 June 2024.
- Sekules, Veronica (1996). "The Gothic Campaigns". In Atherton, Ian; Fernie, Eric; Harper-Bill, Christopher; Smith, Hassell (eds.). Norwich Cathedral: Church, City, and Diocese, 1096–1996. London; Rio Grande, Ohio: The Hambleton Press. pp. 197–209. ISBN 978-1-85285-134-7.
- Seward, Desmond (1988). Henry V: the Scourge of God. New York: Viking. ISBN 978-0-670-81174-8.
- Shakespeare, William (2000). Watts, Cedric (ed.). Henry V. Oxford: Oxford University Press. ISBN 978-1-84022-421-4.
- Sims, Tony (2000). "The Erpingham Gate". In Curry, Anne (ed.). Agincourt 1415: Henry V, Sir Thomas Erpingham and the Triumph of the English Archers. Stroud: Tempus Publishing Ltd. pp. 91–103. ISBN 978-0-7524-1780-6.
- Smith, Christopher (2000). "Shakespeare's Agincourt: Sir Thomas Erpinghamand the Missing Archers". In Curry, Anne (ed.). Agincourt 1415: Henry V, Sir Thomas Erpingham and the Triumph of the English Archers. Stroud: Tempus Publishing Ltd. pp. 139–154. ISBN 978-0-7524-1780-6.
- Sumption, Jonathan (2017). The Hundred Years War. Vol. 4: Cursed Kings. Philadelphia: University of Pennsylvania Press. ISBN 978-0-8122-2388-0.
- Walker, Simon (2004). "John [John of Gaunt], duke of Aquitaine and duke of Lancaster, styled king of Castile and León". Oxford Dictionary of National Biography (online ed.). Oxford: Oxford University Press. doi:10.1093/ref:odnb/14843. OCLC 56568095. (Subscription, Wikipedia Library access or UK public library membership required.)
- Walker, Simon (2008). "Erpingham, Sir Thomas". Oxford Dictionary of National Biography (online ed.). Oxford: Oxford University Press. doi:10.1093/ref:odnb/8842. OCLC 56568095. (Subscription, Wikipedia Library access or UK public library membership required.)
- Wavrin, Jehan de (1887). A Collection of the Chronicles and Ancient Histories of Great Britain, now called England. Vol. 2: from A.D. 1399 to A.D. 1422. Translated by Hardy, William; Hardy, Edward L.C.P. London: Longman, Green, Longman, Roberts and Green. OCLC 1067793813.
- Williams, Benjamin (1846). Chronicque de la Traïson et Mort de Richart Deux Roy Dengleterre. London: English Historical Society. OCLC 1041780246.

Political offices
Unknown	Chamberlain of the Household; 1399–1404	Succeeded by The Lord Grey of Codnor
Honorary titles
Preceded by The Marquess of Dorset	Lord Warden of the Cinque Ports; 1399–1409	Succeeded by Henry of Monmouth, Prince of Wales
