= Simon Walker (historian) =

Historian of late medieval England

Simon Walker (24 January 1958 – 26 February 2004) was a British historian of late-medieval England. Born in Kuala Lumpur, Malaysia, he was educated at Charterhouse School and Magdalen College, Oxford. He was awarded a Prize Fellowship of All Souls College, Oxford where he completed his D.Phil thesis on John of Gaunt. In 1984 he was appointed to a lectureship at the University of Sheffield, and was subsequently promoted to Reader. In 1999 he was appointed a vice-warden of All Souls and gained an Extraordinary Research Fellowship at the College.

Walker's work focused on late-medieval political history, more specifically on the relations between nobles and retainers within the framework often referred to as bastard feudalism. His best-known work, The Lancastrian Affinity, 1361–1399 (1990), explored the retinue of John of Gaunt. Walker died of cancer in 2004.

== Publications ==
- The Lancastrian Affinity: 1361-1399. Clarendon Press. 1990. ISBN 9780198201748.
- Private Indentures for Life Service in Peace and War 1278-1476 (with Michael Jones). Office of the Royal Historical Society, University College London. 1994
- Political Culture in Late Medieval England: Essays by Simon Walker. Manchester University Press. 2006. ISBN 9780719068263.
