= Dienstmann =

German medieval occupation

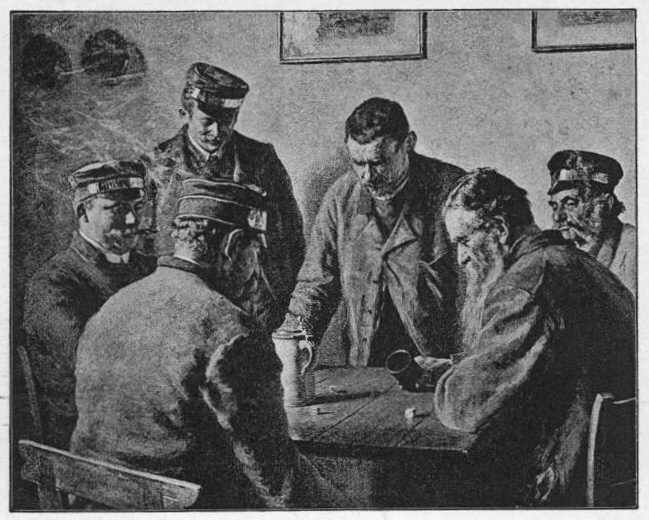
Rudolf Graf Rex: Würfelnde Dienstmänner ("Dice-playing Dienstmänner"), around 1890

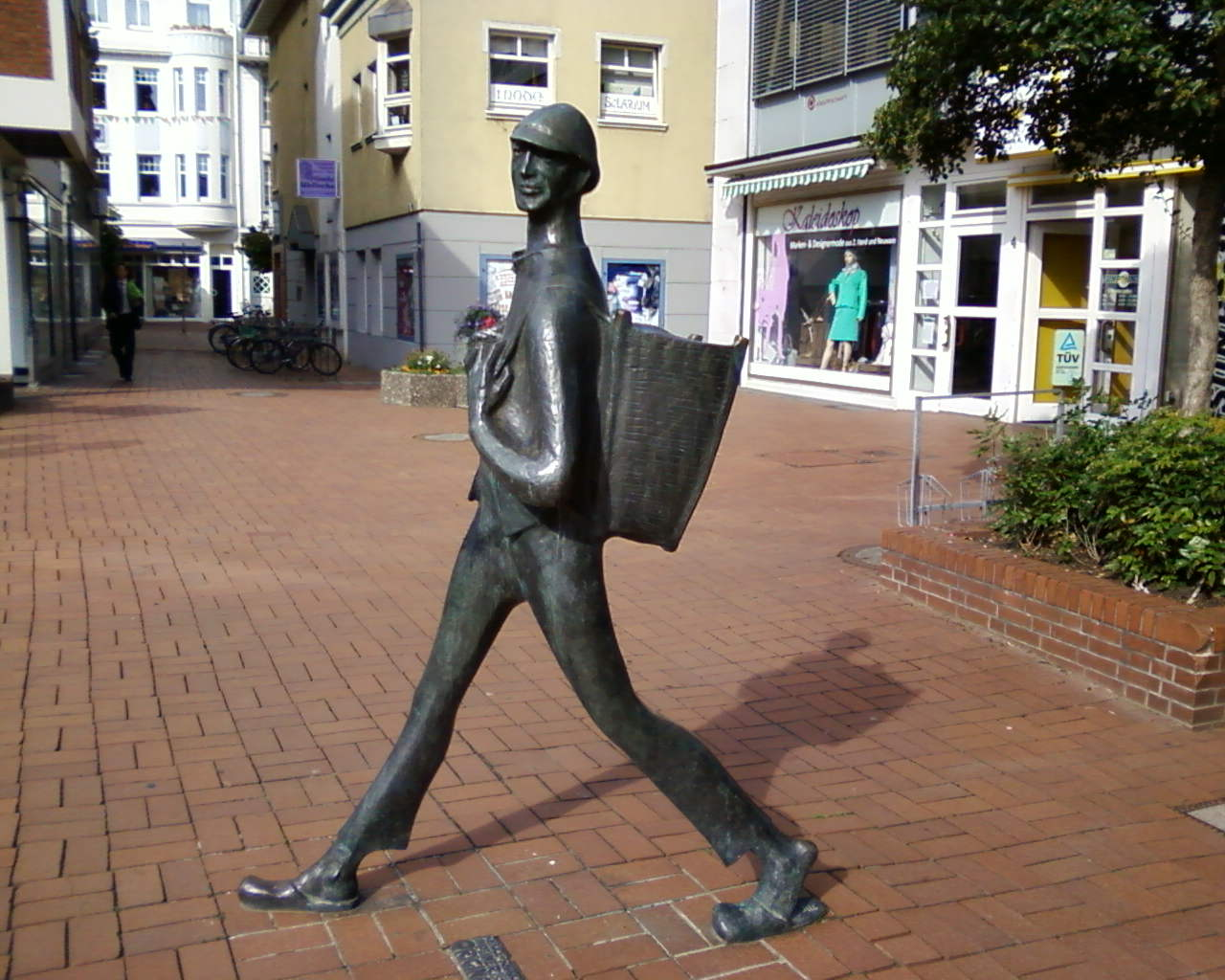
Memorial for a Dienstmann in Peine, Germany

A Dienstmann (German: [ˈdiːnstˌman] plural: Dienstleute, German: [ˈdiːnstˌlɔɪ̯tə] or, in Austria, Dienstmänner, German: [ˈdiːnstˌmɛnɐ]) was a medieval retainer or vassal and, later, a hired man, in German-speaking countries, particularly in Austria until the first half of the 20th century.

== Usage ==
The term Dienstmann first surfaced in the Middle Ages as a Germanicization of the Latin word ministerialis, for men, who served at a court and, in the course of time, were raised to be armigers with a social status similar to that of free knights (Ritter).

However the term Dienstmann could also refer to men who were obliged to pay duties or render socage to their liege lords a socager, or socman. Unlike ministeriales, they held a lower social rank equivalent to the English serf.

Later, the term described was used to describe a hired man who, in public service or in a private household, was contracted to perform time-limited functions of all types in return for a fee. His main duties were the carriage of belongings, such as suitcases, and messenger duties.

== In fiction ==
Well-known fictional Dienstmänner are the Dienstmann, Alois Hingerl, in Ludwig Thoma's Satire Ein Münchner im Himmel or Hans Moser and Paul Hörbiger, the Dienstmänner in the film Hallo Dienstmann. As a so-called Berliner Original, the Dienstmann, Ferdinand Strumpf, went under the name, Eckensteher Nante.

== Literature ==
- Hans Delbrück, trans. Walter Renfroe Jr. History of the Art of War, Volume III: Medieval Warfare (Lincoln, NE: University of Nebraska Press, 1982)
- Fritz Keller: Hallo Dienstmann! In: Wiener Geschichtsblätter 62. Jg., 2007, ISSN 0043-5317, pp. 1–16.
- Fritz Keller: Ignaz Israel Pokart – der letzte jüdische Dienstmann. In: Verena Pawlowsky, Harald Wendelin (ed.): Raub und Rückgabe. Vol. 2: Arisierte Wirtschaft. Mandelbaum-Verlag, Vienna, 2005, ISBN 3-85476-161-9, pp. 85–88.
- Valentin Ferdinand von Gudenus, Friedrich Carl von Buri, Heinrich Wilhelm Anton Buri (ed.): Codex Diplomaticvs. Exhibens Anectoda Ab Anno DCCCLXXXI, Ad MCCC. Mogvntiaca, Ivs Germanicvm, Et S. R. I. Historiam Illvstrantia. 5 vols., Göttingen etc., 1743–1768.
- Wilhelm Scherer (ed.): Hohenfurter Benedictinerregel. In: Zeitschrift für deutsches Alterthum NF 4 = 16, 1872, ISSN 1619-6627, pp. 224–279.
- Richard Schröder: Lehrbuch der deutschen Rechtsgeschichte. 6th revised edition by Eberhard von Künßberg. de Gruyter, Berlin etc., 1922.
- James Westfall Thompson. "German Feudalism". The American Historical Review 28, no. 3 (1923) 440-474.
