= Bastard feudalism =

Supposed socioeconomic system of the late Middle Ages

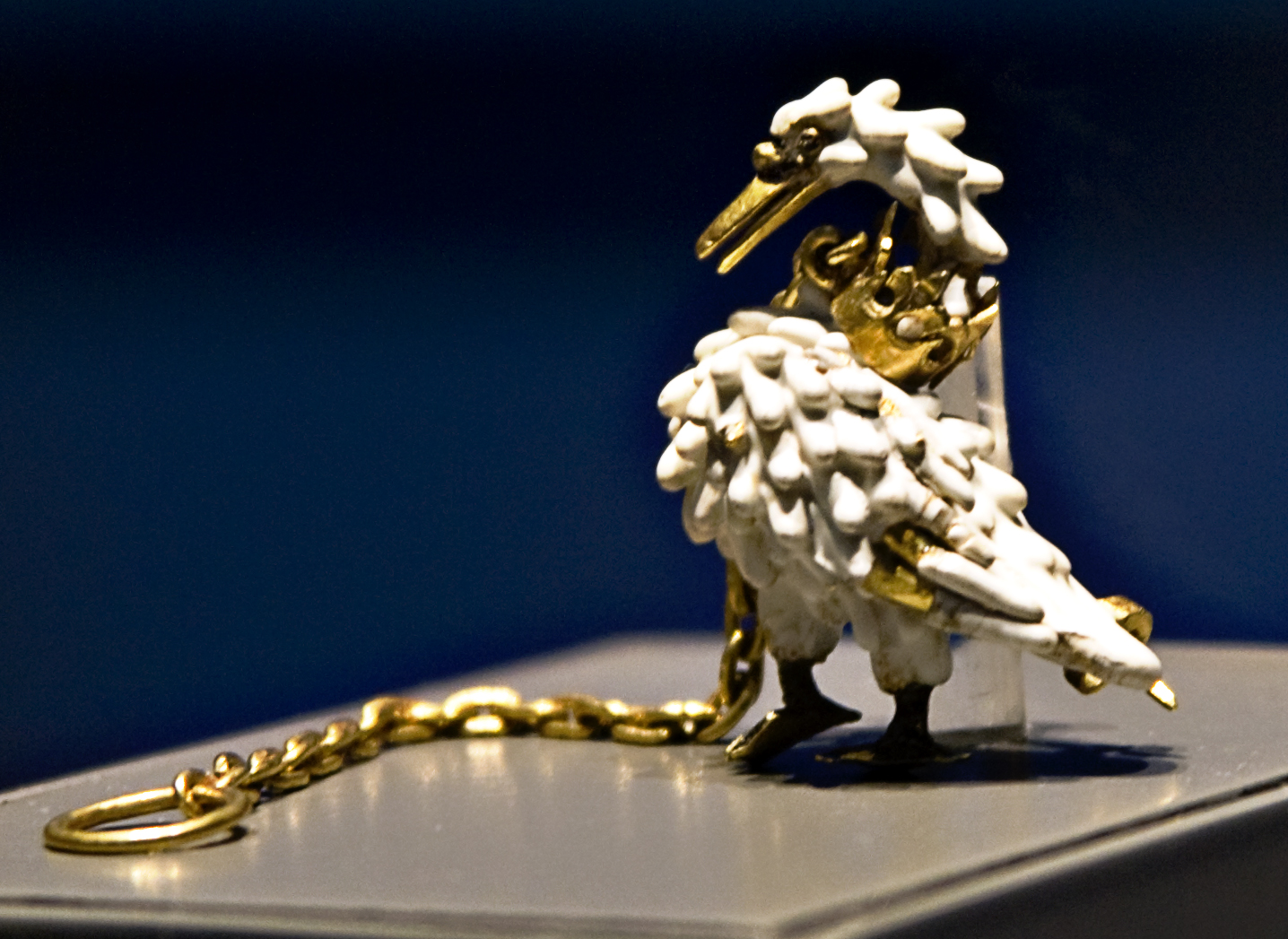
The Dunstable Swan Jewel, a heraldic badge, from c. 1400 (British Museum)

Bastard feudalism is a somewhat controversial term invented by 19th-century historians to characterise the form feudalism took in the Late Middle Ages, primarily in England. Its distinctive feature is that middle-ranking figures rendered military, political, legal, or domestic service in return for money, office, or influence. As a result, the gentry began to think of themselves as the men of their lord rather than of the king. Individually, they are known as retainers, and collectively as the affinity of the lord, among other terms.

== History and historiography ==
The historian Charles Plummer coined the term "bastard feudalism" in 1885. Plummer blamed bastard feudalism for the disorder and instability of the Wars of the Roses in the fifteenth century. However, "bastard feudalism" as a concept is primarily associated with Plummer's contemporary William Stubbs (1825–1901).

According to Stubbs, a shift in English history took place under Edward I (reigned 1272–1307) when the feudal levy was replaced with royal payment in lieu of military service by the great magnates who willingly served the king. Thus, instead of vassals rendering military service when required by the lord, they paid a portion of their income into the lord's treasury. In turn, the lord would supplement the owed military service with hired retainers, a sort of private army in full-time service to the lord.

In the 1940s K. B. McFarlane presented a strong challenge to the ideas of Stubbs. McFarlane stripped the term "bastard feudalism" of any negative connotation. To him, bastard feudalism centered not on the financial aspect (the sums involved were mostly negligible) but on the concept of service in exchange for good favour. In a society governed on a personal basis, service to a lord was the best way to obtain favour in the form of offices, grants, etc. Lords would retain administrators and lawyers, as well as recruit local gentry into their affinities. By offering money instead of land, lords could afford to retain more followers.

In return for becoming retainers, the gentry would expect to rely on their lord's influence in local and national politics. This practice was known as "maintenance". The retainer might wear his lord's heraldic badge or the grander form, a livery collar, which could be very useful in a courtroom. Under a weak king, such as Henry VI (reigned 1422–1461 and 1470–1471), the rivalries of magnates might spill over from the courtroom to armed confrontations, thereby perverting justice.

Because they were rarely kept under arms for long periods, noble retinues were not private armies. Lacking standing armies, kings relied on noble retinues for the military forces they required to conduct wars or to crush internal rebellions. Under an inadequate king like Henry VI, ambitious or disaffected magnates such as Richard of York, 3rd Duke of York (1411–1460) or Richard Neville, 16th Earl of Warwick (1428–1471) could use their network of servants and retainers to defy or even control the crown. Groups of gentry, already coming to blows over local issues, inevitably attached themselves to different patrons. Their private feuds continued under their leaders' banners and transferred to the battlefields of the Wars of the Roses; for example, the tenants and retainers who fought for Richard, Earl of Salisbury during his feud with the Percy family in the early 1450s were raised by him again to march against their King in 1459.

Although Edward IV (reigned 1461–1470 and 1471–1483) attempted to limit "retaining", he generally did not succeed. However, Henry VII (reigned 1485–1509) managed to largely overcome bastard feudalism by imposing financial sanctions on unruly nobles. Furthermore, Henry passed a statute in 1504 that allowed only the King to have retainers – nobles had to apply and pay for a license. Overall, bastard feudalism had vanished by the early seventeenth century.

== See also ==
- History of England
- Nepotism

== Bibliography ==
- Castor, Helen (2000), The King, the Crown, and the Duchy of Lancaster: public authority and private power, 1399–1461, Oxford: Oxford University Press, ISBN 0-19-820622-4
- Coss, P. R. (November 1989), "Bastard Feudalism Revised", Past & Present (125): 27–64, doi:10.1093/past/125.1.27, JSTOR 650860
- Coss, P. R. (May 1991), "Reply", Past & Present (131): 190–203, doi:10.1093/past/131.1.190, JSTOR 650874
- Crouch, David (1995), "From Stenton to Macfarlane: models of societies of the twelfth and thirteenth centuries", Transactions of the Royal Historical Society, 6th series, 5: 179–200, doi:10.2307/3679333, JSTOR 3679333
- Crouch, David (2005), The Birth of Nobility: Constructing Aristocracy in England and France, 950–1300, Harlow: Pearson/Longman, ISBN 0-582-36981-9
- Hicks, Michael (1995), Bastard Feudalism, London: Longman, ISBN 0-582-06091-5
- McFarlane, K. B. (1981), England in the Fifteenth Century, London: Hambledon, ISBN 0-9506882-5-8
- Storey, R. L. (1986), The End of the House of Lancaster, Gloucester: Sutton, ISBN 0862992907
- Stubbs, William (1875), The Constitutional History of England, in its origin and development, Oxford: Clarendon Press
- Wagner, John A (2001), Encyclopedia of the Wars of the Roses, Santa Barbara: ABC-Clio, ISBN 1-85109-358-3
- Warren, John (1995), The Wars of the Roses and the Yorkist Kings, London: Hodder and Stoughton, ISBN 0340611146
- Webber, Bruce (1998), The Wars of the Roses, London: UCL Press
