= Retinue =

Body of servants in service of a dignitary

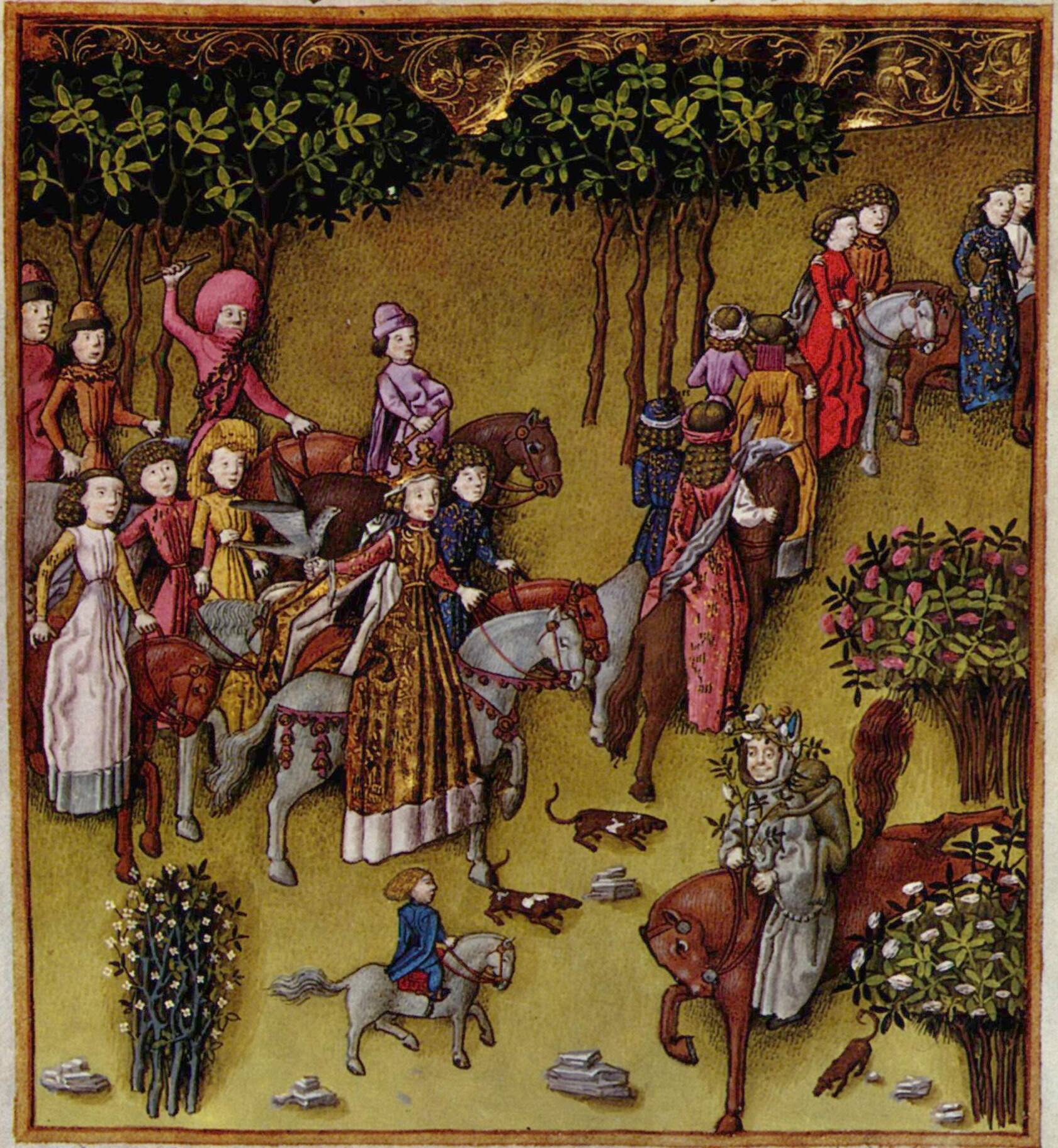
Queen Helen with her retinue on the way to the Shrine of Venus Cloacina, 15th century

A retinue is a body of persons "retained" in the service of a noble, royal personage, or dignitary; a suite (French "what follows") of retainers.

== Etymology ==
The word, recorded in English since circa 1375, stems from Old French retenue, itself from retenir, from the Latin retenere: to hold back or retain.

== Employment ==
Such retainers were not necessarily in the domestic service or otherwise normally close to the presence of their lord, and included others who wore his livery (a kind of uniform, in distinctive colours) and claimed his protection, such as musicians and tutors.

Some were a source of trouble and abuse in the 15th and early 16th century.

Often their real importance was very different from their rank: on the one hand, sinecures and supernumerary appointments allowed enjoying benefits without performing full service. On the other hand, "having the ear" of the master can allow one to act as a confidant in an informal capacity; or in some cases, even as a spy, under the guise of an innocent musician.

The term is sometimes used in the context of the supporters or followers of a medieval knight or great lord, such as Richard, Earl of Salisbury in 15th-century England, which he called upon during the Wars of the Roses.

== Historical examples ==
- Antrustion
- Cohors amicorum
- Comitatus
- Dienstmann in Austria
- Druzhina in Kievan Rus'
- Svita in the Russian Empire
- Manrent, a Scottish clan bond
- Gokenin in Feudal Japan

== See also ==
- Bodyguard
- Great house
