= Affinity (medieval) =

Men whom a lord gathered around himself in his service

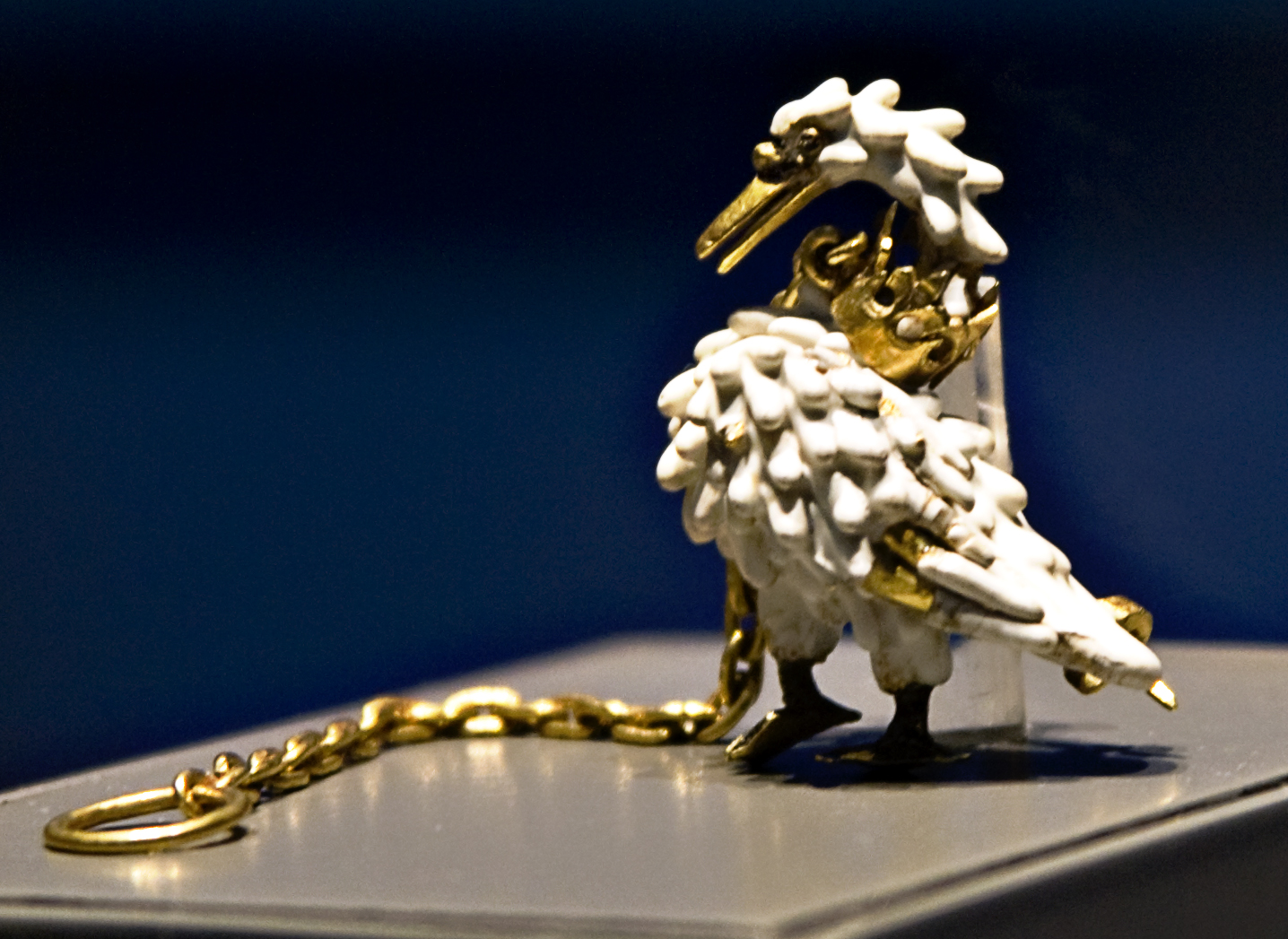
The Dunstable Swan Jewel, a livery badge, from ca. 1400 (British Museum)

In post-classical history, an affinity was a group (retinue) of (usually) men whom a lord gathered around himself in his service; it has been described by one modern historian as "the servants, retainers, and other followers of a lord", and as "part of the normal fabric of society". It is considered a fundamental aspect of bastard feudalism, and acted as a means of tying magnates to the lower nobility, just as feudalism had done in a different way.

One form of the relationship was known as livery and maintenance. The lord provided livery badges to be worn by the retainer and "maintenance" or his support in their disputes, which often constituted obstruction of judicial processes.

== Origins ==
In the Early Middle Ages the comitatus or warband was one term for similar warrior bands.

One of the earliest identifiable feudal affinities was that of William Marshal, 1st Earl of Pembroke, who by 1190 had gathered a force around him consisting of men without necessarily any strong tenurial connection to him. Rather than receiving land, these men received grants of office and the security of Pembroke's proximity to the king. Historian Michael Hicks has described it as a "personal, not feudal" connection, which David Crouch called an early example of a bastard feudal relationship. On the other hand, a hundred years later, the earl of Lincoln gathered bodies of men—often from among his tenants—from his estates in Lincoln, who were still linked to the earl feudally through their tenure of his land.

== Composition ==
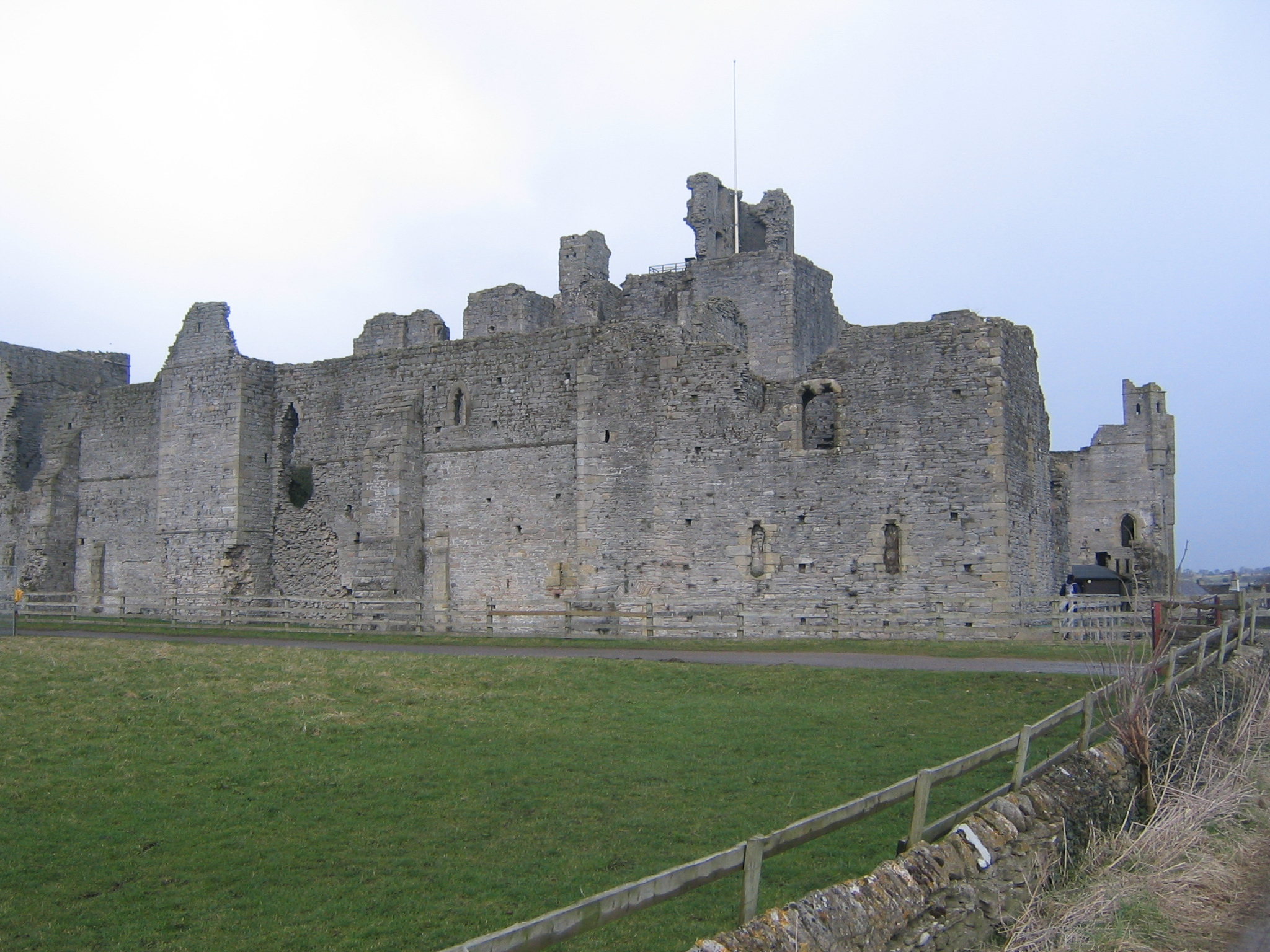
Middleham Castle was the centre of the earl of Salisbury's Yorkshire affinity.

Central to a noble affinity was the lord's indentured retainers, and beyond them was a more amorphous group of general supporters and contacts. The difference, K. B. McFarlane wrote, was that the former did the lord "exclusive service" but the latter received his good lordship "in ways both more and less permanent" than the retainers. Christine Carpenter has described the structure of the earl of Warwick's affinity as "a series of concentric circles" with him at the centre. It has been noted that a lord only had to gather a relatively small number of people around in areas where he was strong, as members of his affinity supported not only him but also each other; thus, the number of men who could come to his aid was often far greater than the number of men he actually knew. These were men the lord trusted: for example, in 1459, on the verge of the Wars of the Roses, the earl of Salisbury gathered the closest members of his affinity to him in Middleham Castle and took their advice before publicly coming out in support of the rebellious duke of York.

The lord would often include men in positions of local authority, for example Justices of the peace, within his affinity. On the other hand, he might, as John of Gaunt did in the later fourteenth century, recruit people into his affinity regardless of their social weight, as an expression of his "courtly and chivalric ambitions", as Anthony Goodman said. A contemporary described these as "kin, friendis, allys and parttakaris" ("kin, friends, allies, and partakers") to the lord. Members of the affinity could usually be identified by the livery the lord would distribute for their identification with him; this could range from simple armbands to "a more exclusive form of livery—exclusive metal mounted riband bands"; high-ranking members of John of Gaunt's retinue—a "highly prized" position—wore the Collar of Esses. The members of the affinity closest to the lord were those of most use: the estate officials, treasurer, stewards, and often more than one lawyer.

== Later Middle Ages ==
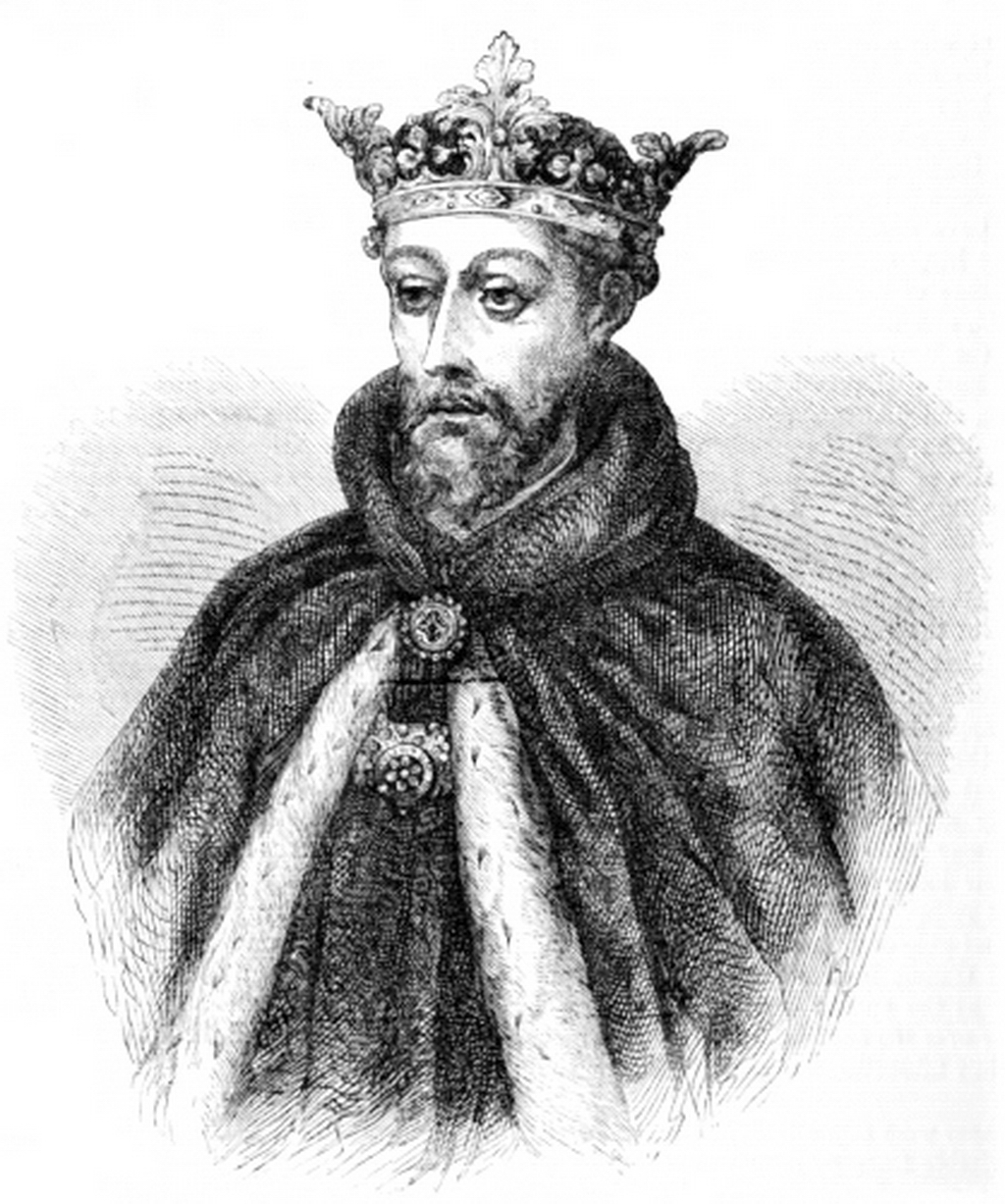
John of Gaunt, Duke of Lancaster: In the later fourteenth century, his affinity was second only to that of the king.

By the late Middle Ages, kings such as Richard II and Henry IV had created their own affinities within the regional gentry, for political as well as martial motives. They were therefore at a greater distance from the royal court, but they were also more numerous than the household knights of earlier kings. By the fifteenth century, most regional agents of the crown were considered to be in the king's affinity, as they had a closer connection to the crown than ordinary subjects. By the reign of Henry VI, E. F. Jacob estimated that the number of squires employed by the king in the localities increased from 150 to over 300.

In Richard's case, it has been suggested it was for the purpose of building up royal power to counteract the pre-existing affinities of the nobility and strengthen his own power. Indeed, they were at the heart of the army Richard took to Ireland on his 1399 campaign, prior to his deposition. This could include several hundred 'King's knights' and esquires, retained with hard cash. In fact, the amounts the crown spent on its regional affinity were the cause of much of the discontent over royal expenditure that Richard II, for example, faced in 1397. Likewise, John of Gaunt's affinity increased by half between 1381 and the early 1390s and cost him far greater sums than the 10% of income that magnates generally expended on their retinues. Gaunt used it to defend his position against the crown as Richard II's reign became increasingly erratic, and his son, Henry of Bolingbroke, inherited it in 1399, and found it a ready-made army that allowed him to overthrow Richard. In very similar circumstances, in 1471, Edward IV, returning from exile to reclaim his throne, gathered his affinity with him as he marched south, and it has been said that "it was as master of such an affinity that at Barnet and Tewkesbury King Edward won a wider mastery". The earl of Salisbury, also using his affinity as a show of strength in 1458, attended a royal council meeting with an affinity of about 400 horsemen and eighty knights and squires; the contemporary Brut Chronicle estimated it at around 500 men.

Affinities were not confined to kings or magnates; in the 1420s, for example, Cardinal Beaufort maintained an affinity in many English counties, although, as a churchman, his affinity was political rather than military. They were not also confined to men: Edward II's consort, Isabella, had an affinity whose "collective influence was as powerful as the most powerful lords," even if with less of a military. They could also be expanded through the course of events; Edward IV's covert marriage to Elizabeth Woodville brought an important Midlands family and their retainers directly into the royal household.

== Historiography ==
The traditional view among historians was that the affinity was a thirteenth-century construction that arose out of the nobility and crown's need to recruit armies, against a backdrop of declining feudal service failing to provide troops. Victorian historians, such as Charles Plummer, saw the affinity as being effectively synonymous with the lord's household, and little more than his personal thugs. The only connection noted between members of the affinity and the retaining lord was a military one. This then led them to see the emergence of noble affinities as directly responsible, in part at least, for the decline in social order in the fourteenth and fifteenth centuries. But as Simon Walker has put it, their unfavourable judgements have largely been replaced by a more sympathetic account that acknowledges the affinity as an essential element in the mechanics of good lordship. For example, a lord would recruit into his affinity some who could provide him with military service, but others who did not; some who were formally retained and some who were not; and ultimately every individual was recruited with mutual benefit at the heart of their relationships. The affinity itself would change depending on whether it was a time of war or peace, or whether it was in an area where the lord was strong. Seen in the context of playing multiple roles, it has been called a "socio-political-military joint-stock enterprise" that helped uphold noble authority without needing a basis in feudalism itself. In the mid-fifteenth century, it could vary in organization from being secured almost exclusively by military indenture (for example, the affinity of William, Lord Hastings) to being based more on blood and marital connections, as with the House of Neville.

Recently it has been questioned whether a royal affinity could actually work in the same way as a noble one. It has been suggested that since the king had to be a lord to his retainers and provide good lordship, but also king to the entire people, a contradiction existed, resulting in a decline in local stability where this occurred. At the same time, even powerful magnates such as Gaunt could cause local dissatisfaction by retaining some and, inevitably, excluding others. On the other hand, it has also been pointed out how, particularly for kings, recruitment into the affinity was a clear promotion which could act as an encouraging loyalty or offered a political amnesty.

== See also ==
- Retainers and fee'd men of Richard Neville, 5th Earl of Salisbury
