= Retainers and fee'd men of Richard Neville, 5th Earl of Salisbury =

Fifteenth-century English northern magnate

Richard Neville, 5th Earl of Salisbury (1400 – 31 December 1460) was a fifteenth-century English northern magnate. He was the eldest son by the second wife of Ralph Neville, 1st Earl of Westmorland, from whom he inherited vast estates in Yorkshire and the North West of England. He was a loyal Lancastrian for most of his life, serving the king, Henry VI, in France, on the border with Scotland, and in many of the periodic crises of the reign. He finally joined York in his last rebellion in the late 1450s and became a Yorkist leader during the early parts of the Wars of the Roses. This led directly to his death following the Battle of Wakefield in December 1460, when he was captured and subsequently put to death in Pontefract Castle.

Salisbury is one of the leading magnates for whom historians lack information regarding his expenditure on annuities while having some idea as to that on retainers. As the historian Michael Hicks has put it, Salisbury attempted to extend the power and influence of his family, not just through the traditional route of marrying his children into local gentry families, but also using contracts and retaining "to bind to him important individuals of rank or domicile naturally beyond his ambit". Retainers were themselves then able—and expected—to raise their own tenants when required for a lords service; Salisbury relied on this in 1459 when those he summoned could themselves "call on tenants and friends in times of trouble". Tenants in general, argues Hicks, "bulked much larger in noble retinues of war than has been supposed" and themselves bought their household and tenantry with them: "every gentleman had his household and tenants to back him up". Lawyers were particularly useful to a lord, and Salisbury recruited among them heavily; they had a duty to attend his council meetings as well as represent him in court.

Hicks identifies different degrees of proximity to the earl through his retaining. Men such as John Conyers, James Strangways and Danby, for example, could be deemed "senior retainers" while others, including Thomas Whitham, John Middleton and John Ireland, would have been considered "lesser officials". They would often join Salisbury on royal commissions, such as in 1440 when William FitzHugh, Christopher Conyers and Robert Danby sat with the earl on an enquiry into a petition from the burgesses of Richmond, North Yorkshire. (Note: Note that at the time he heard this petition from the burgesses of Richmond, Salisbury was himself a burgess of the town on account of his owning property within it.) When the civil wars broke out again in 1459, many of his retainers "rode with Richard Earl of Salisbury and Sir John Neville", his son, to meet Richard, Duke of York at Ludlow Castle. Pollard has identified two broad groups of retainer for Salisbury. Firstly, men who were both geographically close to the nexus of earl's power at Middleham Castle and of social importance in the area—Conyers, FitzRandolph, Metcalfe, Mountford, Routh and Wandesford. Secondly—and to Pollard 'perhaps the more interesting' group—were those retainers of his who lived and operated in what he calls 'enemy territory'. That is, Neville of Brancepeth-controlled estates and those of the Percys. In the former were retainers such as Ralph Pullen and Thomas Lumley in Lower Weardale and Raby. The latter, retained in Percy territory included Robert Ogle of Morpeth, Northumberland, and John Middleton of Belsay. Lords though were not always fighting each other, and at such times their retainers likewise worked together. For example, even though it was little over a month before the Percy–Neville feud broke out into outright violence, in July 1453 James Strangways, Salisbury's man, was sheriff and oversaw the election of two Percy retainers to parliament, and the attestors contained a mix of sympathisers to both.

In the 15th century the North of England was effectively divided among four great landholders: between the crown (as duke of Lancaster), the Duke of York, the Percys and the Nevilles, headed by the Earl of Salisbury. Since the first two were absentee landlords, it was the latter pair who had regional political power, and by the 1450s Salisbury was the most powerful of them. Much of Salisbury's power came from his official position as warden of the west March: this effectively allowed him to raise and maintain a private army among the local gentry—"the best natural source of fighting men in the country"—at the crown's expense. Comments Dockray that the earl

Could confidently expect backing from an impressive line-up of fellow northerners, ranging from baronial houses such as the Greystokes of Greystoke, the Fitzhughs of Ravensworth and the Scropes of Bolton to greater gentry families such as the Strangeways of West Harlsey, the Pickerings of Ellerton, the Haryngtons of Hornby (in Lancashire) and the Conyers of Hornby (in Richmondshire).

Salisbury, for their part, was not just a good opposition to them because of his great wealth, attractive though that must have been in terms of his ability to pay fees, (Note: A typical contemporary use of the term "fee" is given by John Leland in a list of Northumberland's 1486 retainers: Robert Constable was, the earl willed, to "be payed his fee duryng his lyve, he doyng his service unto my heires as he dothe unto me".) but also for his direct contacts with the king's council and the royal family. Salisbury's retainers themselves interconnected, especially in Yorkshire. James Strangways married into the Darcy family, as did John Conyers of Hornby, and Boynton's connection with Fitzhugh probably led to Boynton's appointment as counsel for St Leonard's Hospital, York. Sir John Savile—Sheriff of Yorkshire in 1454—and married Salisbury's retainer Sir Thomas Harrington's daughter. Also, William Fitzhugh's son and heir married Salisbury's daughter Alice, and Sir John Langton, Sheriff of Yorkshire 1424, "had family connections with the Nevilles and Harringtons". Both Stockdale and Boynton, on the other hand, were retained by Salisbury and Lord Fitzhugh, himself retained similarly. Likewise both Pickering and Savile had close connections with York as while being retained by Salisbury. Retained loyalties could be more powerful than presumed loyalties, such as to the crown. Some of the earl's connections may have been highly personal ones, given that in some cases they flourished under Salisbury but did not continue under Warwick.

Hicks also notes the difficulties in ascertaining precise relationships, even though it is known they must have existed in great number; after all, he comments, a fragment of the Middleham receiver's roll of 1458–1459 indicates that the massive sum of 20% of income from the honour was spent on fees and retaining. Salisbury's heavy recruitment among Richmondshire families has been called his "Middleham Connection", as they often provided retainers over multiple generations. The Conyers' family tree, for example, argues Horrox, "is virtually a roll-call of the Neville retinue" in the mid-15th century. While some olf these fees were paid for life service, most were pro tempore, yet nonetheless extensive for being so. (Note: Pollard notes that Salisbury's rival, Henry, Earl of Northumberland was spending up to a third of his annual income on fees and retaining; "was Salisbury matching him?") Another scholar has commented that, although Salisbury "virtually monopolised" the major Duchy of Lancaster offices in the area, "yet evidence to connect any of the West Riding gentry with these lords is embarrassingly slight".

Many of Salisbury's retainers and their families flourished under the subsequent Yorkist regime. in July 1462 Walter Strickland, for example, received a general pardon for all offences—up to and including treason and murder—committed under Henry VI. Richard Tunstall, nephew of John, became a squire of the body and later king's carver. Robert Percy became Comptroller of Edward IV's Household, while sons of the Birnands were esquires of the Household and John Pullen was appointed a serjeant of the cellar.

== Salisbury's retaining and timeline of the political context ==
Timeline of events and Salisbury's retaining
Entries in black are events in Salisbury's life; entries in blue are contextual political events; known dates of Salisbury's retaining are in red

Image	Name	Retained/fee'd	Notes
	Ayscough, William		
	Birnand, (Note: Occasionally rendered Brennand.) John, George and William		Supported Salisbury's sons in their feud with the Percys; combined actions against Percy manors in 1454 with illegal hunting. Notes Wilcock, "other incidents were a direct result of hatred of Sir William Plumpton", for example in 1457 when John attacked Plumpton with a lance. (Note: John's brother was by now dead and Plumpton had deprived him of his inheritance, taking the lands for his own son. In theory the process was legal, as it was recorded on the court rolls that no heir had come forward to claim the land, but given Plumpton's devious nature and land-grabbing tendencies one wonders whether the details were made public in court; Birnand later claimed that attempts to pay an entry fine had been rebuffed by Plumpton. Small wonder that the Birnands were implacable enemies of Plumpton and had been recruited to the Neville cause. By 1459, Plumpton, although nominally royal steward, had lost control of the region; neither his summons to court nor his physical presence were influencing events.) July 1459 disrupted Knaresborough meeting of Sir William Plumpton, who was attempting to announce a royal proclamation. 18 Sept 1459 mustered at Boroughbridge as part of Salisbury's army that would fight at the Battle of Blore Heath later that month, and all subsequently indicted for being vi et armis insurrexerunt with the earl. (Note: As were the other salisbury retainers Ralph, Richard and John Pullan, William, John and Richard Wakefield, Richard Louther, William Parker and Robert Percy. How many of these mustered but did not travel south with Salisbury is unknown.)
	Boynton, Sir Christopher	1436	A lawyer. Probably fought with William Lord Fitzhugh's father, Henry, on Henry V's Harfleur campaign. Retained by Fitzhugh and the Prior of Durham, but also close to Salisbury's father, Ralph, Earl of Westmorland at the opening of whose will Boynton attended. (Note: Medievalist Christopher Liddy also notes that Boynton was not only close to Ralp, but also to his circle, as he acted as executor of the wills of "two of Ralph's most trusted associates", John Morton of York and John Conyers of Hornby in 1412.) Associated with Salisbury from at least 1429, when what Jones and Walker describe as his "reciprocal good lordship" was evidenced by Boynton's promotion to chief justice for Robert Neville in the diocese of Durham. Was retained prior to his departure for France. This was at the height of the Neville–Neville feud, and Boynton's retainer can be explained by his acting as feoffee to Salisbury. In the event of the earl's death in France, the royal council was to transfer the king's interests in his land to Richard Beauchamp, Earl of Warwick, (Note: Beauchamp was both the foremost earl of the kingdom and Salisbury's son-in-law.) Boynton. and other retainers such as Greystoke, Fitzhugh, Christopher Conyers and Robert Constable. (Note: Hios widow was to marry Richard Ratcliffe, a close associate of Richard, Duke of Gloucester and "rat" of William Collingbourne's dogerell.) In their turn, while Salisbury was abroad, were to pay no revenues from the estates to the king but pay directly to Salisbury.
	Constable, Robert	1436	Of Flamborough, died 1488. Greater gentry of the East Riding. His family had been closely associated with the Nevilles in Yorkshire. Acted as Salisbury's receiver of estates and as feoffee while the earl was in France. Trustee for Joan's inheritance while Salisbury was in France in the event of her death. Had links to the Percys also, and appears to have stood with them at Heworth in 1453. Responsible for the charge of "old" Lady Roos, Philippa Tiptoft, whose husband—Thomas, Baron Ros—and son were in Scottish exile with Margaret of Anjou from 1461. Left money to pay for prayers for the soul of Countess Alice in his will and a large diamond ring as well as a bequest to Thomas Witham. Worth over £300 p.a. at his death; comments Dockray, "moreover, had managed to pick his way with some skill through the formidable political obstacles posed by the Wars of the Roses".
	Colt, Thomas		
	Conyers, Sir Christopher	1436	Acted as Salisbury's receiver of estates and feoffee while the earl was in France. Executor of his will. Sued for a general pardon after the Coventry parliament.
	Conyers, Sir John		Son of Sir Christopher Conyers. Described by Keith Dockray as "a tried and trusted Neville partisan", he fought with Salisbury at Blore Heath and was present at Ludford Bridge. Attainted at the 1459 Coventry Parliament, probably for capturing Knaresborough Castle from Plumpton. During the rule of the Yorkists, on 14 October 1460 was commissioned to secure Penrith, Pontefract and Wressle castles. Following Salisbury's death, he transferred his allegiance to Warwick, whose side he took when Warwick fell out with King Edward in the late 1460s.
	Dacre, Lord Thomas	1435	In perhaps a different aspect of good lordship, Sir Thomas Dacre entered a bid for the wardenship of the West March 'probably with Salisbury's blessing' after Salisbury resigned.
	Danby, Robert		Of Yofford. A lawyer.
	Delamore, Thomas (Note: Also rendered de la More.)		Thomas de la More 'seems also to have been associated closely enough' with Salisbury to receive preferential treatment at the Exchequer during the earl's Chancellorship. Booth goes as far as to suggest that, taking good lordship to its extremity, Salisbury showed himself to be a 'willing manipulator of the truth' on his servant's behalf.
	Eure, Robert	1435	Jointly retained by Salisbury and his mother Joan, Countess of Westmorland. Eure was uncle to Henry FitzHugh, 5th Baron FitzHugh, who married Alice Neville. Also appointed steward of the Palatinate of Durham by the bishop, Salisbury's brother Robert.
	Frank, William		Had previously acted as feoffee to Salisbury's father, Ralph, Earl of Westmorland. A prominent member of the local gentry from Kneeton and close associate of Richard Clervaux. (Note: Richard Clervaux had extensive business interests among Salisbury's retainers, including James Strangways, John Conyers, Thomas Mountford and Christopher Boynton. Pollard notes that, after salisbury's death, "Clervaux drew closer to the Middleham connection, although he does not appear to have become a feed member of it".) Clerk of the honour of Richmondshire in the 1420s.
	William, Lord Fitzhugh	1436	Acted as feoffee while Salisbury was in France in 1436. Salisbury supported Fitzhugh in the latter's property dispute with John, Lord Scrope of Masham two years later. Attended a Great Council with Salisbury in November 1453 at the height of the feud with the Percy family. Fitzhugh's son and heir married Salisbury's daughter Alice.
	Greystoke, Ralph, Lord	1447	Indentured at Sheriff Hutton Castle to ride with Salisbury "in time of peace and of war". Although his indenture explicitly exempts him from serving with Salisbury in France. However, he appears to have revowed his loyalty to King Henry in 1459 and fought for the king at Wakefield. Dockray posits that he had "been playing a double game" since Ludford, which would account for his absence from the Battle of Towton and the new King's failure to attaint him at his first parliament later that year.
	Harrington, Sir Thomas	By 1442	Of Hornby. Linked to the Nevilles from birth; his mother was a daughter of Robert Neville of Hornby, a cadet branch. Salisbury's deputy as steward of Blackburn Wapentake by 1442. On 23 July 1455 was elected MP for the West Riding of Yorkshire to attend York's 2nd protectorate parliament, by which time he is a known associate of Salisbury. Sheriff of Yorkshireduring York's second protectorate, 1456. One of Salisbury's councillors who in September 1458 "was sente for to come to Myddleham to Erle of Sarisburie [to] take ful partie with ye ful noble prince the duke of Yorke". Fought for Salisbury at Blore Heath but was captured and imprisoned in Chester Castle. Attainted at Coventry. Appointed to the Yorkist commissions of the peace in July 1460 after their victory at the Battle of Northampton and attainted at Coventry later that year. He appointed Countess Alice and Warwick as supervisors of his will in 1459. Joined York and Salisbury at Sandal Castle by 21 December 1460. Fought and died on 30 December 1460 at the Battle of Wakefield where the Yorkist army went down to a crushing defeat.
	Harrington, Sir John		Son of Sir Thomas Harrington. Fought and captured with him at Blore Heath. Commissioned with Sir John Conyers to secure Penrith, Pontefract and Wressele Castles in October 1460. Fought and died with his father at Wakefield; head set above a York city gate.
	Hopton, John		Originally from Yorkshire; when Hopton was young, "at a crucial moment he had needed a patron, he had turned to his local lord, Richard Neville, earl of Salisbury". A member of the Royal household, he was 'connected over fifty years' with the earl of Salisbury, according to Hicks. Their first connection was probably in 1429, soon after Salisbury's ennoblement, when H and on William Routh placed three disputed manors before him for his arbitration. Although the case dragged on in chancery for another six years, Hopton was eventually victorious. Thirty years later, Routh was also later retained by the earl. Hopton had links to Yorkshire, and in July 1455 he witnessed a charter in favour of John Neville, Salisbury's son. Government suspicion of Hopton's connection with Salisbury may have led to his being removed from the 1459 peace commission. (Note: Colin Richmond casts doubt on the strength of Hopton's and Salisbury's relationship, however, arguing that whatever connection they had,... It can hardly have been a close connection, and probably connection is altogether too weighty (and weighted) a word to describe what may have been the most tenuous, the most distant of relationships. Dare we even call what may only have been a nodding acquaintanceship a relationship?)
	Hotoft, John	1429	Of Warwick and Ware, Hertfordshire.
	Lazenby, William		A lawyer.
	Louther, Hugh		Leading member of Cumberland gentry. Commissioned with Sir John Conyers and Sir John Harrington to secure Penrith, Pontefract and Wressle castles in October 1460.
	Louther, Richard		Joined the Birnands in their actions against the Percys, and in their hunting, in 1454. In July 1459 disrupts Plumpton's Knaresborough meeting with the Birnands. On 18 September 1459, he mustered at Boroughbridge when Salisbury marched his army south.
	Thomas, Lord Lumley		
	Metcalfe, Miles		Retained by the 1450s, received an annual fee of 66s 8d. Received a grant in 1464 for earlier good service "to the king, the king's father Richard, late Duke of York, and the king's uncle Richard, late Earl of Salisbury". Salisbury's patronage enabled hm, notwithstanding humble origins, to become a figure of some significance in the region.
	Meyring, Sir John		Attainted at the Coventry parliament.
	Middleton, Sir John		Probably led the Neville rising in Yorkshire in the summer of 1460, intended to distract attention from the Nevilles' and the Earl of March's landing at Sandwich, Kent.
	Mountford, Sir John		Ally of John Neville during the feud with the Percys; reprimanded, as one of Salisbury's "principal accomplices", by a commission of oyer and terminer in July 1453 for rioting and assaults upon Percy retainers during the two families' feud.
	Mountford, Sir Thomas		Involved in the Percy–Neville feud on Montagu's side, and ordered by the council to "ceasse these riotts and keep our pees". Appointed Justice of the peace for the North Riding following the battle of Northampton, Elected, with Sir James Strangways, as MP for Yorkshire, on 30 July 1460, for York's parliament.
	Musgrave, Richard	1456	Fees paid out of the lordship of Penrith. Acted as Salisbury's receiver of estates while the earl was in France. (Note: Musgrave's indenture of retaining is interesting, says historian J. W.Armstrong, because it is one of only a few to contain a clause saving his allegiance to other people, in this case, Musgrave's brother-in-law, John, Lord Clifford and father-in-law Thomas, Lord Dacre.) Peter Booth has argued that salsibury was not in a strong political position at this time—York's second protectorate had ended and Margaret of Anjou was showing increased animosity to their faction—and this is reflected in indentures such as that with Musgrave, which indicate the limits of the earl's power locally. Musgrave had been associated with the dead Lord Clifford, and Musgrave's indenture with Salisbury contracted that "the said Richard shal not assist the said lordez [Clifford and Dacre] ne neither of them in his person, [nor] his men, with counseil ne otherwise ayenst the seid Erl". Musgrave, on the other hand, wanted assurances thsat he would not be implicated in any future treason of Salisbury's, so he requested that "in case it lust the seid Ric[hard] to labour as a tretour for the wele of any suche matere, the said Erl agreeth him not to take in that bihalve the same Ric[hard] to eny straungenesse or displeasour". (Note: Booth suggests that, Such legal protection was of little use in the heat of battle, but full-blooded civil war was hardly expected when the indenture was made. This rather strange clause shows above all else that Salisbury was seen as a man of honour, since there would have been little point in insisting on its inclusion if there had been no expectation of it being kept, but the language also reveals his contempt for his impertinent vassal.) Remained loyal to Edward IV and commissioned to hunt down Lancastrian recalcitrants in the north—and in the words of the original commission "for defence against Henry VI and his adherents"—in the early 1460s.
	Ogle, Sir Robert		Raided Dunbar with the earl in 1448 and probably brought a contingent of Salisbury's retainers to the First Battle of St Albans in 1445.
	Parr, Sir Thomas	By 1430	Of Kendal, Westmorland, "probably the most powerful gentry family in the county". On friendly terms with Salisbury since at least 1429. According to Simon Payling, this is dateable to the shenanigans surrounding the election of MPs for that year's parliament, when Parr's name—along with fellow Neville sympathiser Thomas de la More—was entered into the candidates' list instead of the Percy retainers who had actually been elected. This is despite being deputy sheriff to Lord Clifford—a Percy associate—in the county in the 1440s. Feuded with the Percy-adherent Bellingham family through the 1440s, and complained of being assaulted on his way to parliament in 1446, which resulted in an act of parliament condemning Thomas Bellingham. "Yet, despite his Neville sympathies and two decades of mutual support, Parr was cautious. He did not appear among the anti-Somerset partisans at the first battle of St Albans". Summoned to Salisbury's council where it was decided to take York's side, 1459. Steward of Salisbury's brother, George, Lord Latimer's estates in Werstmorland whose estates had been granted to Salisbury in 1449 (Note: Although the grant was not officially made until 1451.) on account of Latimer's being supposedly idiota by then. Fought at Blore Heath; went to Calais with Salisbury. Described by historian Rosemary Horrox as, by the 1450s, one of Salisbury's leading retainers and probably his highest-profile retainer in Westmorland. Attainted at Coventry in 1459. Married into the Percy-aligned Tunstall family. Joined York and Salisbury at Sandal Castle by 21 December 1460. A "veteran campaigner", (Note: To the extent that Dockray says, It is certainly difficult to understand why Richard of York allowed himself to be manoeuvred into fighting a battle at all... It is odd, too, that, with such veteran campaigners as Richard Neville Earl of Salisbury, Sir Thomas Harrington and Sir Thomas Parre in his team, he was not prevailed upon to hold back from what really does seem to have been an extraordinarily rash decision to engage a much larger army on grounds of its own choosing.) He fought for the Yorkists at Wakefield and was reported by many chroniclers of the day to have been killed, but he survived, not dying until November 1461. Unknown if he fought at any of the battles following, but in any case, "He had, however, acquitted himself sufficiently well to carn the new king, Edward IV's, personal gratitude and favour".
	Percy, Sir Robert (Note: This is Robert Percy the elder; his son and namesake is the individual who grew up at Middleham Castle under the tutelage of the Earl of Warwick, and in doing so became close friends with the future Richard III and Francis, Lord Lovell. Described by Nigel Saul as one of Richard III's "closest intimates", he fought on the king's side at the Battle of Bosworth and died there in 1485.)		Died 1469. Of Scotton, Richmondshire, a remote cadet branch of the main Percy family. Involved in attacks on William Plumpton (Note: After the accession of Edward IV, Percy sued Plumpton in chancery alleging that when Percy had been captured after Wakefield, Plumpton had tried to have him beheaded.) during the Percy–Neville feud and joined Salisbury's army at Boroughbridge for which he was later indicted the following year. Foraging raids not only weakened his enemy, Plumpton's position, but also enabled him and his cadre to appropriate hundreds of bows that were made in Knaresborough forest for the royal army. Probably a captain of Salisbury's army and responsible for the large contingent of Scotton men who fought. Appointed chief forester of Haverah Park in 1461. Between 1465 and 1467 he complained in chancery that in the last years of the previous reign Plumpton had repeatedly raided his house at Scotton taking goods and animals "of great value", but from which he was prevented from approaching for fear of his life. Also charged that Plumpton attempted to have him beheaded in Pontefract at the same time as Salisbury was executed.
	Pickering, Sir James		Appointed sheriff of the West Riding in 1450, and elected its MP on 23 June 1455, with Thomas Harrington (both of whom were 'openly associated' with Salisbury by then). Was an attestor at York Castle during Strangway's shrievalty in which Percy men were elected; a few months later "he was one of those organizing and leading Neville gangs against Percy retainers". Reprimanded, as one of the earl's "principal accomplices", by a commission of oyer and terminer in July 1453 for rioting and assaults upon Percy retainers during the two families' feud. Following the Battle of St Albans Pickering and Salisbury's son John denounced York's constable of Conisbrough Castle and steward of Hatfield, Sir William Skipwith, whom they claimed had refused to come south with York to fight the king and as a result was dismissed; as a consequence, they were both granted a share of Skipwith's stewardship and constableship. Councillor to York. Elected MP with Thomas Harrington in the factional election of 1455. Member of Salisbury's council, consulted prior to the earl's taking "full partie" with York. Attainted 1459, followed Salisbury into Calais exile with a 500 mark (Note: A medieval English mark was an accounting unit equivalent to two-thirds of a pound.) bounty on his head. Joined York and Salisbury at Sandal Castle by 21 December 1460, died at Wakefield. Head set above a York city gate.
	Pullen, (Note: Or Pullein) Ralph	At least 1456 (Note: Receiving £1 6s 8d; he is listed on one the only surviving list of Salisbury's retainers from 1456–1459.)	Of Scotton, near Knaresborough; active in the feud between that town and Ripon over disputed market rights. Involved in attacks on the archbishop of York's bailiff of Ripon, John Walworth—whom Pullen was alleged to have tried to "beate and fley"—in 1440. Led assaults on William Plumpton during the Percy–Neville feud and joined Salisbury's army at Boroughbridge. Important recruiter for Salisbury's army. Granted the Crown manor of Scotton, in the 1450s, under whose control it "became a hotbed for dissent and pro-Neville Yorkist activity". Occupied Knaresborough Castle, with John Mackenfiedl—during which time William Plumpton's younger brother Thomas was assaulted—for Salisbury on 26 September 1459. May have been killed at Blore Heath since his widow, Johanna, was veiled as a nun three months later.
	Quxley, John		Armiger from Durham; executor of Salisbury's father's will. In 1909, Henry Noble MacCracken proposed Quixley as the translator of John Gower's Traité pour essampler les amants marietz, originally in French. (Note: The name is suggested to come from Whixley, a village a few miles northwest of York. Although more modern scholarship—for instance that of Elizabeth Dearnley and R. F. Yeager—have proposed Robert de Quixley, prior of Nostell Priory, Wakefield, as the translator. The latter considering the suggestion that Quixley gave a copy of his translation to his daughter Alice on her wedding day, remarks, "Well, perhaps. Who knows what the Quixley père et fille were like at home? But in general, balade sequences fulminating against adultery are not what most fathers think of as wedding gifts for daughters".)
	Robynson, John		An early retainer of Salisbury's, possibly serving in a non-military capacity, being a merchant from Scarborough. If he did of course, as the record of his doing so is his own admission in April 1460 having been arrested by Lord Egremont. He was held in Egremont's Wressle Castle for six weeks until he agreed to pay him £50.
	Salkend, Sir Richard		Probably from the Western March.
	Saville, John		Described by the History of Parliament project as coming into "one of the largest gentry inheritances in the West Riding". Seems to have held office for York in Sandal Castle from at least 1434, when he was charged with false imprisonment of a local man. Served in France with York in 1436 and 1441; knighted—probably by the duke—the following year. Elected MP for Yorkshire in 1450, where his attestors were other Salisbury retainers, John Conyers and James Pickering. Probably marched with York at his abortive attack on the crown at Dartford, as he sued for a pardon later that year. Sheriff of Yorkshire 1454–1455, as part of which office would have played a role in the prosecution of the Earl of Northumberland's younger sons, Thomas Percy, Lord Egremont and Sir Richard Percy, captured after the Battle of Stamford Bridge in October 1454. As sheriff, oversaw the election of two other Neville men, Thomas Harrington and James Pickering. Led a northern force at St Albans in 1455. Fought for Salisbury at Blore Heath. Married the daughter of his fellow retainer Thomas Harrington. Steward of York's Wakefield lordship, a post in which he carried out regular extortion. Attainted in 1459. Probably fought at Wakefield in 1460 (Note: His primary manor of Thornhill was only 7 miles (11 km) from the battlefield.) and Towton the next year. He does not appear to have been rewarded to the extent he may have expected following Edward IV's accession, receiving few grants or further offices in Yorkshire. He died in 1481 and his effigy in Thornhill church is one of the few in the region to bear a Yorkist livery collar of suns and roses.
	Scargill, William	By 1443	The family was from Scargill, Durham, and were traditionally retainers of John of Gaunt. William (fl. 1415–1459). Along with Salisbury's wife Alice, acted as executors of Anne, Countess of Cambridge, mother of Richard, Duke of York, in 1446. The same year, probably thanks to Salisbury's influence, he was appointed steward of the lordship of Sherburn. Scargill used a number of the earl's retainers as feoffees that decade, including James Strangways, Christopher Boynton, Thomas Wombwell and William Ayscough. Acted as royal official of several occasions including escheator of Yorkshire in 1424 and many commissions. Witnessed a deed in favour of John, Salisbury's son in July 1455, along with John Hopton.
	Stapleton, (Note: Confusingly, there is an unconnected Stapleton family of Wigghill, headed by John Stapleton, a retainer of the Earl of Northumberland who had fought at Heworth in 1454 and was killed with his lord at the first Battle of St Albans.) Brian		His father had been retained by Henry Bolingbroke, founder of the Lancastrian regime, as Earl of Derby. Of Carlton, d.1466. Responsible for the custody of Henry, Duke of Exeter in July 1454, who had joined the Percys in their feud with the Nevilles and was sentenced to be imprisoned in Pontefract Castle.
	Stapleton, Sir William		Probably from the Western March.
	Stockdale, Thomas	1421	A lawyer from Pishiobury, Hertfordshire. Exchequer official, he took the muster in 1437 of Robert, Lord Willoughby before his leaving for France. On good relations with both the earls of Westmorland and Percy in the first quarter of the century. Regularly acted as a mainpernor and feoffee to Salisbury; he transacted business for Neville while the latter was still a minor. Retained for a 19-year term although—perhaps indicating his importance to Salisbury, suggests Charles Ross—after his term expired he continued serving the earl for the rest of his life. Due to his work at the exchequer, his primary importance for Salisbury appears to have been making and receiving payments for him.
	Strangways, Sir James	1446	Originally from Manchester, and legally trained. Retained by indenture in which he reserved his loyalties to not just Salisbury but also to the duchess of Norfolk and the bishop of Durham—Salisbury's elder sister and younger brother, respectively—but the king and Strangways' own family. (Note: Historian K. B. McFarlane described this as "'a commodious escape route' for the retainer".) Acted as Salisbury's receiver of estates while the earl was in France. Strangways' brother Thomas had married Salisbury's sister Katherine, Duchess of Norfolk in 1440, although Thomas was dead by 1443. (Note: James Strangways was himself in receipt of an annuity from his future brother-in-law the duke of Norfolk between 1413 and 1423.) Was made chief justice to the palatinate of Durham under the episcopacy of Robert Neville; became Lord of the manor of West Harlsey within the bishopric. James Strangways was appointed Salisbury's executor in May 1459. With Thomas Mountford, elected MP for Yorkshire in July 1460. (Note: Strangways' indenture of retaining contains a clause saving his allegiance to two relatives of Salisbury and Strangways' own "'kynne and alies... within the thride degree of mariage".) Mistakenly reported to John Paston that Strangways had died fighting for Salisbury at Wakefield. Speaker of the first Yorkist parliament in 1461, his laudatory speech is notable as the longest-recorded extant opening speech of any medieval speaker. Continued in Warwick's service under the new regime. His eldest son Richard married the daughter of Salisbury's brother, William, later Earl of Kent.
	Strickland, Walter	1448	Upper gentry of Sizergh Castle, Westmorland, also with national interests. Assessed as having an annual income of £13 in 1436. Around 1440 he received—and returned—a 1,000-mark reward for slaying the "notorious traitor" Henry Talbot, who had been condemned a traitor by Henry V. He was appointed master of the king's dogs for this service. Strickland was deputy steward of the honour of Kendal when Salisbury received his appointment to steward in 1435, and this presumably accounts for Strickland moving into Salisbury's circle. In 1442, took the muster of John, Lord Talbot, who was travelling urgently to France to reinforce York in Normandy. (Note: Talbot was to be made Earl of Shrewsbury in May that year.) Another grant within the lordship has been described as illustrating the "carelessness, lack of attention to detail and sheer incompetence [which] were the hallmarks of the king's involvement in government", as it had already been granted to another. (Note: His grant contained a clause stating that it would be void if found to have been granted to anyone else previously; "such qualifying clauses were not usually to be found under other kings, who would have delayed making any grant until a clerk could check whether or not it was still in the king's gift", notes historian James Ross.) Retained by an indenture for life which omitted the common clause requesting him to bring his own men, leaving it to be implied. Could call out 290 tenants for Salisbury's use. (Note: This included 11 householdmen, 55 from his Natland manor, 75 from Stainton, 16 from Hencaster, 48 from Siggiswyke, 34 from Whynfield, 32 from Wynder, and 26 from Hackthorp. His potential army included 69 archers with horses and light armour, 74 horsed and harnessed billmen, and 147 infantry wilding a mixture of bows and bills.) Probably intended for use on the West March during times of war with Scotland, as war with Scotland was known to be imminent. (Note: Culminating with the Battle of Sark that October.)
	Threkald, Sir Henry	1431, 1448	Retained by Salisbury for service on the Western March by indenture in 1431 for service abroad rather than in the north.
	Tunstall, John		Lower gentry. A known Neville man, as a Middleham servant of Salisbury's. Regularly sat on partisan commissions in the north-west with other Salisbury retainers and had been elected MP for Cumberland in 1453 despite having no links to the county. (Note: For example, that of 1459 looking into the disposal of Lord Dacre's lands, in which Tunstall was joined by Sir Thomas Neville, Salisbury's second son, and Sir Thomas Parr and Thomas Delamore.)
	Varney, Ralph		Mercer from London. Probably a Neville, rather than York's follower, as he stood mainprise for some of Salisbury's men in 1454. He was also one the delegation sent by the Court of Common Council to oppose Lancastrian requests for assistance from the city in 1460.
	Vaux, Roland		
	Wandesford, John		Of Kirklington. Retained at £4 per annum. Was involved in 'the business of the inheritance of Middleham' during Salisbury's feud with his half-brother. In 1440 he witnessed Salisbury's mother, Joan Beaufort's, will. Married Eleanor, sister of fellow retainer Thomas Mountford. Not retained by Warwick after Salisbury's death.
	Weltden, Richard		
	Witham, Thomas		A lawyer of Cornburgh (Note: In the vicinity of Salisbury's castle at Sheriff Hutton.) and according to Hicks "a trusted man of business". Appointed Chancellor of the Exchequer during the 1454 protectorate, while Salisbury was Lord Chancellor, and again—"for life"—during the second protectorate of 1455–1456. However, he was pardoned in December 1459 and kept his position on the North Riding King's Bench. He was confirmed in the post of Chancellor by Edward IV. Left Countess Alice a diamond ring in his will. Executor of Salisbury's will in 1461 and spent the last years of his life in the service of Salisbury's eventual successor in the north, Richard, Duke of Gloucester. Friend and executor to Robert Constable.
	Womewill, Thomas	1426	Of Pontefract. Associate of Salisbury since at least the 1440s; acted as feoffee for fellow retainer William Scargill in 1448.
