= Haig =

Haig may refer to:

== Places ==
- Haig Avenue, football stadium in Southport, England
- Haig, British Columbia, settlement in British Columbia, Canada
- Haig, Nebraska, a community in the United States
- Haig Point Club, private community on Daufuskie Island, South Carolina
- Haig-Thomas Island, one of the Sverdrup Islands in Qikiqtaaluk Region, Nunavut, Canada
- Mount Haig-Brown, mountain on Vancouver Island, British Columbia
- The Haig, a jazz club in Hollywood

== Companies and organizations ==
- Haig Fund, British charity set up in 1921 more properly the Earl Haig Fund charity
- Haig Homes, a British charity founded in 1928 to provide housing for ex-servicemen
- Earl Haig Fund Scotland, Scottish charity founded in 1921

== People ==
=== Mononym ===
- Hayk (also transliterated as Haik or Haig or Haig Nahabed), Armenian Patriarch

=== Given name ===
- Haig Acterian, pen name Mihail (1904–c. 1943), Romanian-Armenian film and theater director, critic, dramatist, poet, journalist, and fascist political activist
- Haig H. Kazazian Jr. (1937-2022), American professor
- Haig Mardirosian (born 1947), American-Armenian academician and Dean Emeritus
- Haig Oundjian (born 1949), English-Armenian figure skater
- Haig Papazian, Lebanese-Armenian multidisciplinary artist, composer, and architect
- Haig Patigian (1876–1950), Armenian-American sculptor
- Haig Sare (born 1982), Australian rugby union player
- Haig Tchamitch, American bridge player
- Haig Tiriakian (1871–1915), Armenian politician and a member of the Armenian National Assembly
- Haig Yazdjian, Armenian-Syrian composer, vocalist and oud player, producer
- Haig Young (born 1928), Canadian politician

=== Middle name ===
- Ben-hur Haig Bagdikian (1920-2016), Armenian-American journalist
- William Haig Brown (1823–1907), English cleric and reforming headmaster
- James Haig Ferguson (1862–1934), Scottish gynaecologist

=== Surname ===
- Haig (surname)

== Titles ==
- Earl Haig, Peerage of the United Kingdom
- Clan Haig

== Other uses ==
- Haig-Simons income, measure of economic income also known as Schanz-Haig-Simons income
- Haig Point Range Lights, navigational range lights on Calibogue Sound at Daufuskie Island in Beaufort County, South Carolina
- Haig (whisky), a brand of Scotch whisky
- The Haigs, a 1960's Dutch band that featured Barry Hay

== See also ==
- Hague (disambiguation)
- Haigh (disambiguation)
- Hogue (disambiguation)
- Haik (disambiguation)
