= Haig (surname) =

Haig is a surname of Old English origin. Notable people with the surname include:

- Al Haig (1922–1982), American jazz pianist
- Alice Haig (born 1985), English actress
- Alan Haig-Brown (born 1941), Canadian novelist
- Alan Haig-Brown (footballer) (1877–1918), British Army officer and footballer
- Alexander Haig (1924–2010), U.S. Army general, White House Chief of Staff and U.S. Secretary of State
- Brian Haig (born 1953), American novelist
- David Haig (born 1955), British actor
- David Haig (biologist) (born 1958), Australian biologist
- Derek Haig, fictional character in Canadian TV series Degrassi: The Next Generation
- Douglas Haig, 1st Earl Haig (1861–1928), senior British commander during World War I
- Douglas Haig (actor) (1920–2011), American child actor in silent and sound films
- George Haig, 2nd Earl Haig (1918–2009), British soldier and artist
- Georgina Haig (born 1985), Australian actress
- Henry Haig (1930–2007), English stained-glass artist
- Ian Maurice Haig AM (1935–2014), Australian public servant and diplomat.
- Jack Haig (disambiguation), several people
- Jimmy Haig (1924–1996), New Zealand rugby player
- Jimmy Haig (footballer) (1876–1943), Scottish footballer
- John Thomas Haig (1877–1962), Canadian politician
- Kenneth G. Haig (1879–1958), British physician and writer
- Matt Haig (born 1975), British author
- Ned Haig (1858–1939), Scottish rugby union player
- Nigel Haig (1887–1966), British cricketer
- Paul Haig (born 1960), Scottish musician
- Richard Haig (born 1970), Welsh footballer
- Roderick Haig-Brown (1908–1976), Canadian writer and conservationist
- Shirley Haig (born 1950), New Zealand hockey player
- Sid Haig (1939–2019), American actor

== See also ==
- Hague (disambiguation)
- Haigh (surname)
