= Haigh =

Haigh may refer to:

== Places ==
- Haigh, Greater Manchester, England - a village
- Haigh, West Yorkshire, England - a village

== Other uses ==
- Haigh (surname)
- Haigh's Chocolates, Australian chocolatier
- Haigh Foundry, a locomotive manufacturer based in Wigan, England
- Haigh Field, a public airport in the city of Orland, Glenn County, California, USA

== See also ==
- Haig (disambiguation)
- Hague (disambiguation)
- Haik (disambiguation)
- Hayko (disambiguation)
