= Battle of Barnet =

1471 engagement in the Wars of the Roses

- Part of the Wars of the Roses
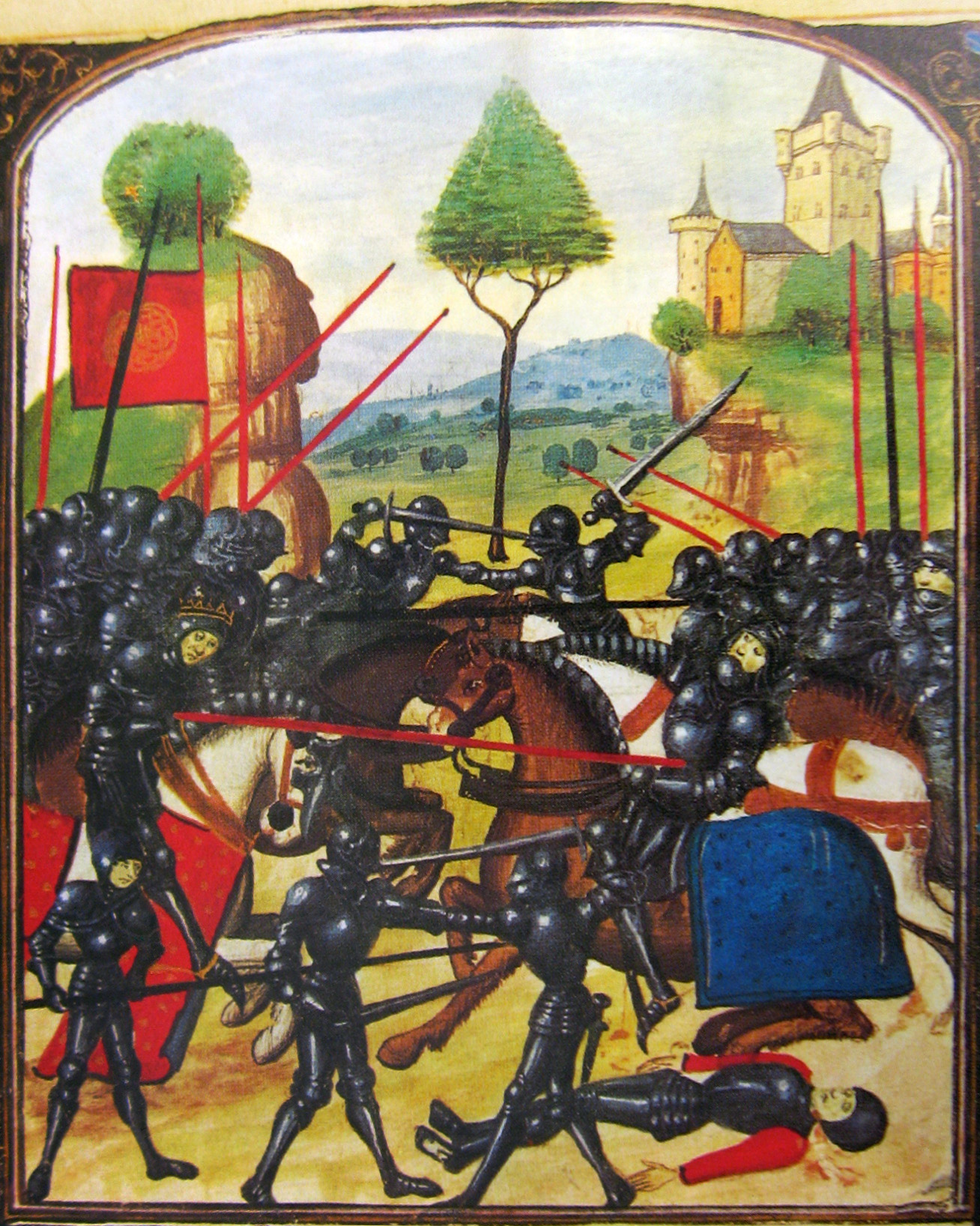
- Late 15th-century artistic portrayal of the battle: Edward IV (left), wearing a circlet and mounted on a horse, leads the Yorkist charge and pierces the Earl of Warwick (right) with his lance; in reality, Warwick was not killed by Edward.
Date	14 April 1471
Location	(north of) Barnet, Hertfordshire, England 51°39′57″N 0°11′56″W
Result	Yorkist victory

Belligerents
House of York	House of Lancaster

Commanders and leaders
Edward IV; Duke of Gloucester (WIA); Baron Hastings	Earl of Warwick †; Marquess of Montagu †; Duke of Exeter (surrendered); Earl of Oxford

Strength
7,000–15,000	10,000–30,000

Casualties and losses
1,000	10,000
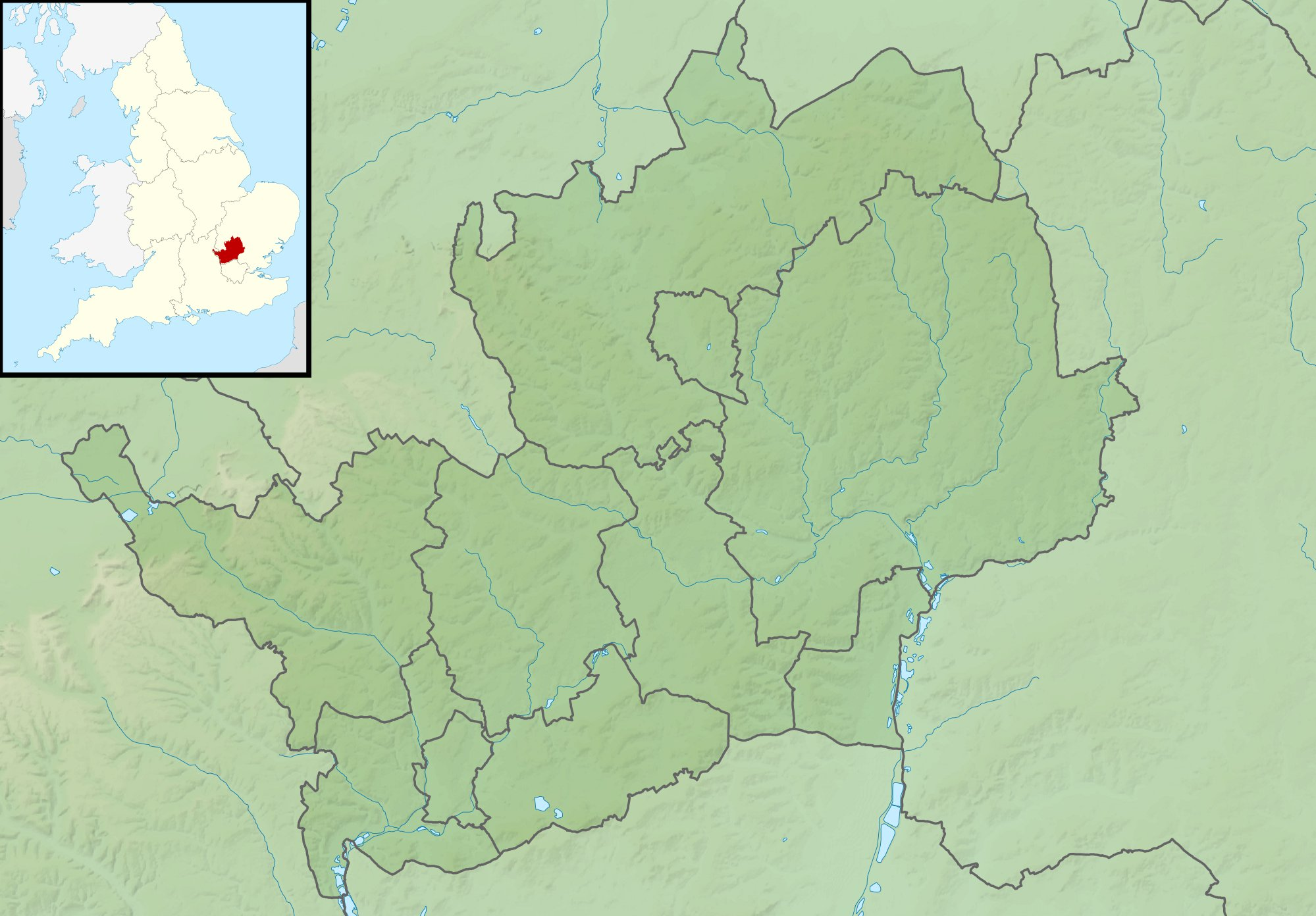
- Location within Hertfordshire

The Battle of Barnet was a decisive Yorkist victory in the Wars of the Roses, a dynastic conflict of 15th-century England. The military action, along with the subsequent Battle of Tewkesbury, secured the throne for Edward IV.

On Sunday 14 April 1471, Easter Day, near Barnet, then a small Hertfordshire town north of London, Edward led the House of York in a fight against the House of Lancaster, which backed Henry VI for the throne. Leading the Lancastrian army was Richard Neville, Earl of Warwick, who played a crucial role in the fate of each king. Historians regard the battle as one of the most important clashes in the Wars of the Roses, since it brought about a decisive turn in the fortunes of the two houses. Edward's victory was followed by 14 years of Yorkist rule over England.

Formerly a key figure in the Yorkist cause, Warwick defected to the Lancastrians over disagreements about Edward's nepotism, secret marriage, and foreign policy. Leading a Lancastrian army, the earl defeated his former allies, forcing Edward to flee to Burgundy in October 1470. The Yorkist king persuaded his host, Charles the Bold, the Duke of Burgundy, to help him regain the English throne. Leading an army raised with Burgundian money, Edward launched his invasion of England, which culminated at the fields north of Barnet. Under cover of darkness, the Yorkists moved close to the Lancastrians and clashed in a thick fog at dawn. As both armies fought, the Earl of Oxford on the Lancastrian right routed the Yorkists opposite under Lord Hastings, chasing them back to Barnet. On their return to the battlefield, Oxford's men were erroneously shot at by the Lancastrian centre commanded by Lord Montagu. As cries of treason (always a possibility in that chaotic period) spread through their line, Lancastrian morale was disrupted and many abandoned the fight. While retreating, Warwick was killed by Yorkist soldiers.

Warwick had been such an influential figure in 15th-century English politics that, on his death, no one matched him in terms of power and popularity. Deprived of Warwick's support, the Lancastrians suffered their final defeat at the Battle of Tewkesbury on 4 May, which marked the end of the reign of Henry VI and the restoration of the House of York. Three centuries after the Battle of Barnet, a stone obelisk was raised on the spot where Warwick purportedly died.

== Background ==
The Wars of the Roses were a series of conflicts between various English lords and nobles in support of two different royal families descended from Edward III. In 1461 the conflict reached a milestone when the House of York supplanted its rival, the House of Lancaster, as the ruling royal house in England. Edward IV, leader of the Yorkists, seized the throne from the Lancastrian king, Henry VI, who was captured in 1465 and imprisoned in the Tower of London. His wife, Margaret of Anjou, and their son, Edward of Westminster, fled to Scotland and organised resistance. Edward IV crushed the uprisings and pressured the Scottish government to force Margaret out; the House of Lancaster went into exile in France. As the Yorkists tightened their hold over England, Edward rewarded his supporters, including his chief adviser, Richard Neville, 16th Earl of Warwick, elevating them to higher titles and awarding them land confiscated from their defeated foes. The Earl grew to disapprove of the King's rule, however, and their relationship later became strained.

Warwick had planned for Edward to marry a French princess—Bona of Savoy, sister-in-law to Louis XI of France—to create an alliance between the two countries. The young king, however, favoured ties with Burgundy and, in 1464, further angered the Earl by secretly marrying Elizabeth Woodville; as an impoverished Lancastrian widow, she was regarded by the Yorkists as an unsuitable queen. Edward bestowed gifts of land and titles on her relations and arranged their marriages to rich and powerful families. Eligible bachelors were paired with the Woodville females, narrowing the marriage prospects for Warwick's daughters. Furthermore, the Earl was offended by two matches involving his kin. The first was the marriage of his aunt, Lady Katherine Neville, over 60 years old, to Elizabeth's 20-year-old brother, John Woodville, a pairing considered outside of normal wedlock by many people. The other was his nephew's fiancée, the daughter of Henry Holland, 3rd Duke of Exeter, who was taken as a bride by the Queen's son, Thomas Grey, with Edward's approval. Exasperated by these acts, Warwick decided the Woodvilles were a malignant influence on his liege. He felt marginalized: his influence over the young king was failing, and he decided to take drastic action to force Edward's compliance. Warwick's alternative plan was to replace the King with his fellow conspirator, the Duke of Clarence, Edward's younger brother.

Instigating several rebellions in the north, Warwick lured the King away from his main bastion of support in the south. Edward found himself outnumbered; while retreating, he learned that Warwick and Clarence had called for open support of the rebellion. After winning the Battle of Edgcote on 26 July 1469, the Earl found the Yorkist king deserted by his followers, and brought him to Warwick Castle for "protection". Lancastrian supporters took advantage of Edward's imprisonment to stage uprisings. Because most Yorkist-aligned warlords refused to rally to Warwick's call, the Earl was pressured to release the King. Back in power, Edward did not openly pursue Warwick's transgressions against him, but the Earl suspected that the King held a grudge. Warwick engineered another rebellion, this time to replace Edward with Clarence. The two conspirators, however, had to flee to France when Edward crushed the uprising—the Battle of Losecoat Field—on 12 March 1470. Through letters in the rebels' possession and confessions from the leaders, the King uncovered the Earl's betrayal. In a deal brokered by the French king, Louis XI, the Earl agreed to serve Margaret and the Lancastrian cause. Warwick invaded England at the head of a Lancastrian army and, in October 1470, forced Edward to seek refuge in Burgundy, then ruled by the King's brother-in-law Charles the Bold. The throne of England was temporarily restored to Henry VI; on 14 March 1471, Edward brought an army back across the English Channel, precipitating the Battle of Barnet a month later.

== Commanders ==
=== Yorkist ===
Edward IV was normally at the forefront of his armies. Standing 6 ft 3 in (1.91 m), he was an inspiring figure in combat, attacking foes while wearing a suit of gilded armour. Medieval texts describe the King as handsome, finely muscled and with a broad chest. He was personable and charismatic, easily winning people to his cause. Edward was a capable tactician and leader in battles. He frequently spotted and exploited defensive frailties in enemy lines, often with decisive results. By 1471 the young king was a highly respected field commander. He received some criticism, however; after winning the throne in 1461, he proved indecisive about putting down rebellions. Historian Charles Ross praises Edward's leadership and skill in close combat rather than his strategies and tactics.

With his good looks and capable leadership, Edward was popular among the common people, especially compared to Henry VI. His trade policies, which aimed to expand and protect markets for English commerce, pleased local merchants, who were also won over by the Yorkist king's personality. By 1469 Edward's groundswell of popular support had eroded. The euphoria of a change in government had ebbed and the people blamed Edward for failing to "bring the realm of England in[to] great popularity and rest" and allowing Yorkist nobles to go unpunished for abuses. When Edward invaded England in 1471, not many common people openly celebrated his return.

Edward was joined at Barnet by his brothers, Richard, Duke of Gloucester, and George, Duke of Clarence. Unlike his eldest brother, Gloucester was slender and seemingly delicate. He was 18 years old at the Battle of Barnet, his first major engagement. His military prowess, however, was well respected; many historians judge him a capable warrior and military leader. Clarence was not as well regarded as his brothers, especially in matters of loyalty. When Edward became king, Clarence became his heir; however, Edward's marriage to Elizabeth Woodville threatened to displace the Duke in the line of succession to the throne. Hence, Clarence participated in Warwick's schemes, marrying the Earl's daughter Isabel, believing he could gain his brother's throne. Clarence lost faith in the Earl when Warwick defected to the Lancastrians and married off his other daughter, Anne, to their prince in order to cement his new allegiance. When Edward launched his campaign to retake England, Clarence accepted his brother's offer of pardon and rejoined the Yorkists at Coventry on 2 April 1471. The last of the Yorkist commanders was William, Lord Hastings, a loyal subject since the start of the wars. Hastings had accompanied the young king in exile and supported his return. The courtier was rewarded for his faithfulness, gaining the lieutenancy of Calais in 1471 and becoming Edward's lord chamberlain and primary confidant.

=== Lancastrian ===
Warwick had fought for the House of York since the early stages of the Wars of the Roses and alongside his cousin, Edward IV, in many of the battles. His years of loyalty earned him the trust of the Yorkists, and his victories—both political and military—and popularity with the common people made him an important figure. He had powerful influence over the line of succession, earning him the nickname "The Kingmaker". Early historians described him as a military genius, but by the 20th century his tactical acumen was reconsidered; Philip Haigh suspects that the Earl largely owed some of his victories, such as the First Battle of St Albans, to being in the right place at the right time. Christopher Gravett believes the Earl was too defensive and lacked mental flexibility.

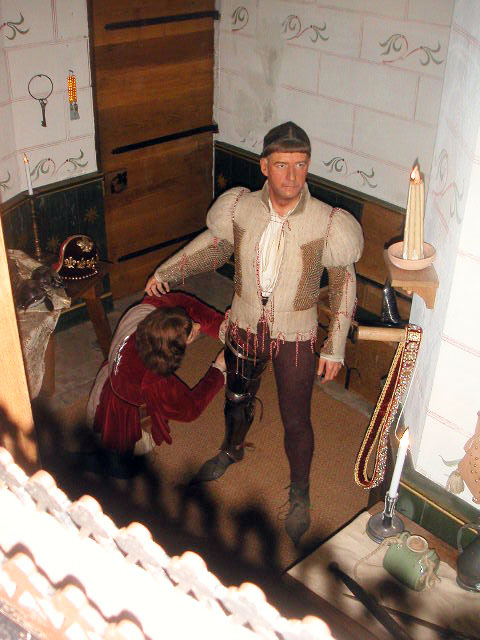
The Earl of Warwick prepares for the battle in this diorama at Warwick Castle.

John Neville, 1st Marquess of Montagu, was less ambitious than his brother Warwick, but a more capable warrior and tactician. In 1464 he commanded a Yorkist force that turned the tables on a Lancastrian ambush at the Battle of Hedgeley Moor and launched a surprise attack at the Battle of Hexham. These victories capped Neville's extensive service in the north, and Edward rewarded him with the Earldom of Northumberland, which bore substantial income. The gift was particularly gratifying for Neville; his family had experienced a deep feud with the former earls of Northumberland, the Percys, who supported the House of Lancaster. However, in March 1470, Edward, trying to win over the Percys' support, reinstated Henry Percy to the earldom. As recompense, Neville received the grander title of Marquess of Montagu; however, the lands accompanying this rank were much poorer than the estate he had lost. The new marquess saw it as an insult—an insubstantial title that was inadequate recognition for his years of faithful service. Montagu did not immediately join Warwick's rebellion, however; he defected later in the year when his brother invaded England.

Not much is known about the early history of John de Vere, 13th Earl of Oxford, another Lancastrian commander; the chronicles mention little about him until the Battle of Losecoat Field. His father, the previous earl and a loyal Lancastrian, was executed for a failed plot to assassinate Edward IV. The Yorkist king tried to secure the loyalty of Oxford by knighting him and pardoning his transgressions. This tactic failed; Oxford remained true to the Lancastrian crown and participated in Warwick's effort to dethrone Edward. Historians describe the young Oxford as a decent military leader, exemplified by his conduct in the Battle of Barnet.

Although Henry Holland, 3rd Duke of Exeter, was of royal blood, he was commonly viewed as a criminal, prone to violence and stupidity. A proven enemy of the Nevilles, Exeter bore a grudge particularly against Warwick for displacing him from his hereditary role of Lord High Admiral in 1457. Nonetheless, when Warwick joined the Lancastrians, Exeter obeyed Margaret and served under the Earl during the invasion of England. Although he supported the Lancastrian cause, Exeter had family ties to the House of York; he was husband to Anne of York, Edward's sister.

== Prelude ==
On 14 March 1471, Edward's army landed at Ravenspurn. Gathering more men as they went, the Yorkists moved inland towards York. Edward's march was unopposed at the beginning because he was moving through lands that belonged to the Percys, and the Earl of Northumberland was indebted to the Yorkist king for the return of his northern territory. Furthermore, Edward announced that he was returning only to claim his father's title of Duke of York and not to contest the English crown. The ruse was successful: Montagu, who was monitoring Edward's march, could not convince his men to move against the Yorkist king.

Once Edward's force had gathered sufficient strength, he dropped the ruse and headed south towards London. Fighting off Exeter's and Oxford's attacks, he besieged Warwick at Coventry, hoping to engage the earl in battle. Although Warwick's force had more men than Edward's army, the earl refused the challenge. He was waiting for the arrival of Clarence, who wanted to use their combined strength to overwhelm the Yorkists. When he learned of this, Edward sent Gloucester to entreat Clarence to return to the House of York, an offer that Clarence readily accepted. Reconciled, the royal brothers moved towards Coventry, and Clarence urged Warwick's surrender. Infuriated with his son-in-law's treachery, Warwick refused to speak to Clarence. Unable to fight the earl at this time, Edward turned again towards London.

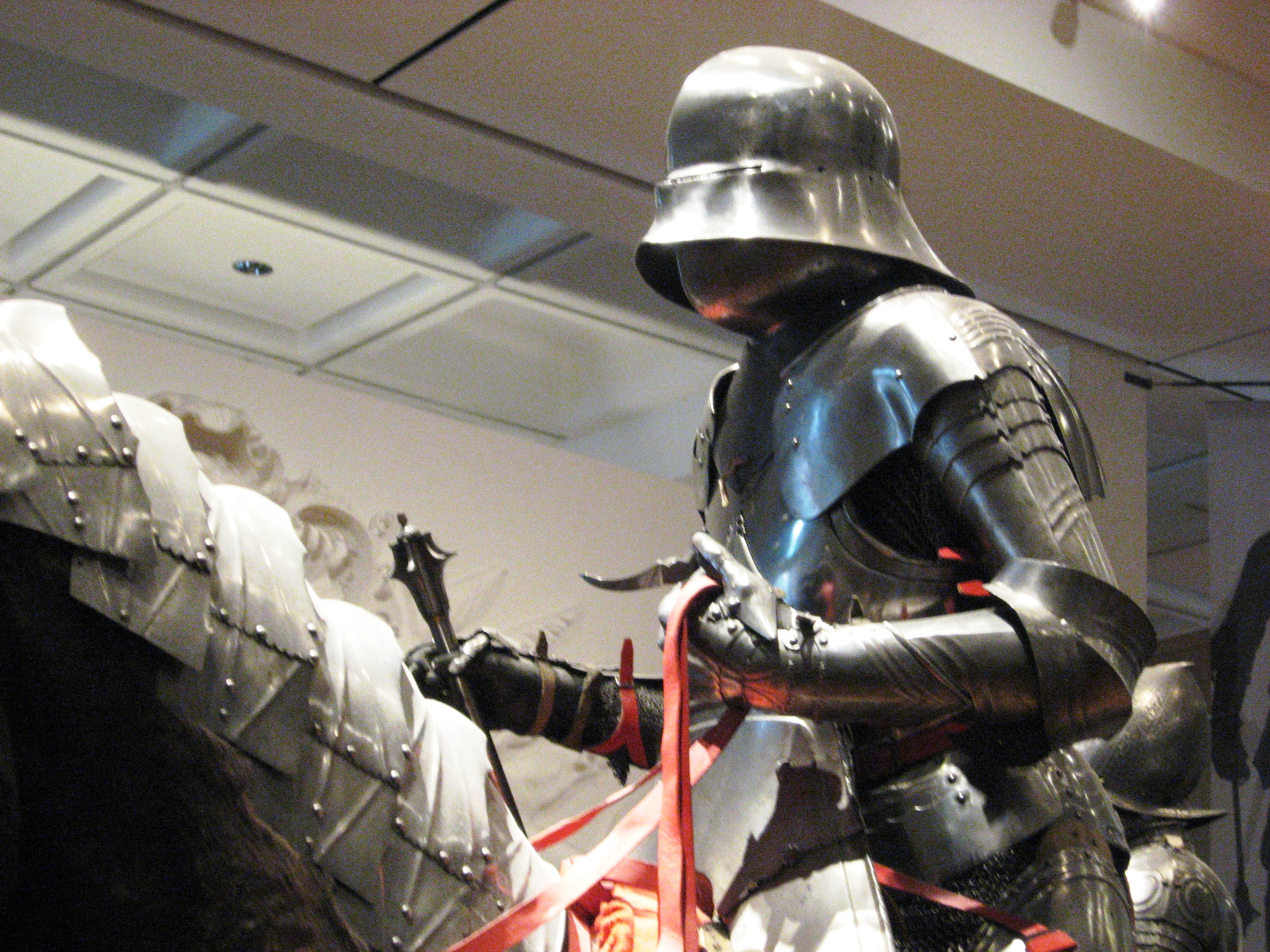
Nobles in the Battle of Barnet wore composite field armour like this suit exhibited at the Royal Armouries Museum.

Reinforced by Montagu, Oxford and Exeter a few days later, Warwick followed the Yorkists' trail. He hoped that London, under Somerset's control, would close its gates to Edward, allowing him to catch the Yorkist army in the open. The city, however, welcomed Edward warmly; Somerset had left the city and the London populace preferred the young Yorkist king to Henry VI. The old king greeted his usurper warmly and offered himself into custody, trusting "[his] life to be in no danger in [Edward's] hands." Lancastrian scouts probed Barnet, which lay 19 kilometres (12 mi) north of London, but were beaten off. On 13 April their main army took up positions on a ridge of high ground north of Barnet to prepare for battle the next day. Warwick arrayed his army in a line from east to west, on either side of the Great North Road running through Barnet. Oxford held the right flank and Exeter the left. Montagu commanded the centre, and Warwick readied himself to command from among the reserves. The earl displaced his entire line slightly to the west; a depression at the rear of his left flank could impede Exeter's group if they had to fall back.

Warwick's army heavily outnumbered Edward's, although sources differ on exact numbers. Lancastrian strength ranges from 10,000 to 30,000 men, with 7,000–15,000 on the Yorkist side. Facing this disadvantage, Edward hurried to meet the Lancastrians with a surprise attack. He brought Henry VI along to prevent the Lancastrians from retaking their king. Edward reached Barnet in the evening, and without knowing the precise location of his foes, prepared the battle line. The Yorkist king deployed Hastings on the left and entrusted Gloucester to lead the right flank. Clarence would fight alongside Edward in the centre, although this was not due to faith in his ability—it was easier for the Yorkists to keep an eye on their twice-defected prince there. A contingent of reserves was kept at the rear, ready to deploy at Edward's call. As night fell, Edward put his plan for surprise morning attack in motion. Under a strict order of silence, the Yorkist army crept closer to the Lancastrians. During the night, neither commander spotted the opposing army, an event that proved crucial in the battle the next day.

During the night, Warwick ordered his cannons to continually bombard the estimated position of the Yorkists' encampment. The Yorkists, however, had sneaked in close, and the Lancastrian artillery overshot their enemies. The Yorkist cannon, meanwhile, kept quiet to avoid betraying their location. As the armies settled down to rest, Montagu approached his brother and advised him of the troops' low morale. He suggested that, as the highest-ranking commanders, the brothers should fight on foot throughout the battle instead of riding on horse. The soldiers believed that mounted commanders tended to abandon them when the situation deteriorated. By staying on foot, the Nevilles would show that they were prepared to fight to the death with the men, inspiring the troops to stand and fight harder. Warwick agreed and the horses were tethered to the rear, near Wrotham Wood.

== Fighting in the mist ==
Early battle: Oxford led the Lancastrian (red) right wing to outflank the Yorkists' (white) left and routed it southwards. Gloucester, likewise, advanced through Monken Hadley to attack the Lancastrians' left.

On 14 April 1471, at around 4 o'clock in the morning, both armies woke. Edward had planned for an early attack, however, and quickly roused his men to engage the Lancastrians. Both sides fired their cannon and arrows before laying into each other with polearms. The morning fog was thick and the night movements of the two forces had displaced them laterally with each other. Neither group was facing the other; each was offset slightly to the right. This displacement meant that the right end of either army could outflank the other by wrapping around the opposing left end. The Lancastrians were the first to exploit this advantage; Oxford's group quickly overwhelmed Hastings'. Yorkist soldiers fled towards Barnet, chased by the Lancastrians. Some of Hastings' men even reached London, spreading tales of the fall of York and a Lancastrian victory. Oxford's group disintegrated as they split off to loot the fallen enemies and plunder Barnet. Yelling and chasing after his men, Oxford rallied 800 of them and led them back to the battle.

Due to the fog, visibility was low and the two main forces failed to notice Oxford's victory over Hastings. Accordingly, the collapse of the Yorkist left wing had little (if any) effect on morale of either side. The fighting between Montagu's and Edward's groups was evenly matched and intense. The Lancastrian left wing, however, was suffering treatment similar to that Oxford had inflicted on its counterpart; Gloucester exploited the misaligned forces and beat Exeter back. Progress for Edward's brother was slow because his group was fighting up a slight slope. Nonetheless, the pressure he exerted on the Lancastrian left wing rotated the entire battle line. Warwick, seeing the shift, ordered most of his reserves to help ease the pressure on Exeter, and took the rest into fighting at the centre. Gradually, the battle line settled to an orientation that slanted north-east to south-west.

Oxford retraced his steps through the fog back to the fight. His group arrived, unexpectedly, at Montagu's rear. Obscured by the fog, Oxford's "star with rays" badge was mistaken by Montagu's men for Edward's "sun in splendour". They assumed their allies were Edward's reserves and unleashed a volley of arrows. Oxford and his men immediately cried treachery; as staunch Lancastrians, they were wary of Montagu's recent defection. They struck back and began withdrawing from the battle. Their shouts of treason were taken up and spread quickly throughout the Lancastrian line, breaking it apart as men fled in anger, panic and confusion. As the fog started to dissipate, Edward saw the Lancastrian centre in disarray and sent in his reserves, hastening its collapse. Cries of Exeter's demise from a Yorkist axe resounded across the battlefield from the Lancastrian left, and amidst the confusion, Montagu was struck in his back and killed by either a Yorkist or one of Oxford's men.

Late battle: as the fighting continued, the battle line rotated and Oxford returned to a line that was oriented mostly northeast to southwest.

Witnessing his brother's death, Warwick knew the battle was lost. He made for the horses in an attempt to retreat. Edward recognised his victory was at hand, and—deciding that Warwick was more valuable alive than dead—sent the order and dispatched his guards to bring back the earl alive. Several chroniclers have suggested that the king thought Warwick would again be a valuable ally if persuaded back to the Yorkist cause. Historian Michael Hicks, in contrast, suggests that Edward wanted to capture the earl for public execution rather than as a gesture of mercy. Regardless of the king's intent, Warwick died in the Lancastrian rout: when fleeing the field he was struck off his horse and killed.

A miniature model reproduction of the Battle of Barnet can be found at the Battle's natural interpretive centre, The Barnet Museum.

== Post-battle ==
The battle lasted from two to three hours, and was over by the time the fog lifted in the early morning. As usual in most battles of the time, the routed army suffered far more casualties; fleeing men were cut down from behind. Contemporary sources give various casualty figures; the "Great Chronicle of London" reports 1,500 dead, whereas "Warkworth's Chronicle" states 4,000. Edward Hall and Raphael Holinshed, both 16th-century chroniclers, say that at least 10,000 men died in the battle. The Yorkists suffered half as many casualties as the Lancastrians. Royle favours the recorded approximate figures of 500 Yorkists and 1,000 Lancastrians dead.

The bodies of the two Neville brothers were brought back to London. They did not suffer the customary fate accorded to traitors—quartering and display at the city gates. Edward exhibited the brothers' naked corpses in St. Paul's Cathedral for three days to quell any rumours that they had survived, before allowing them to be laid to rest in the family vault at Bisham Abbey.

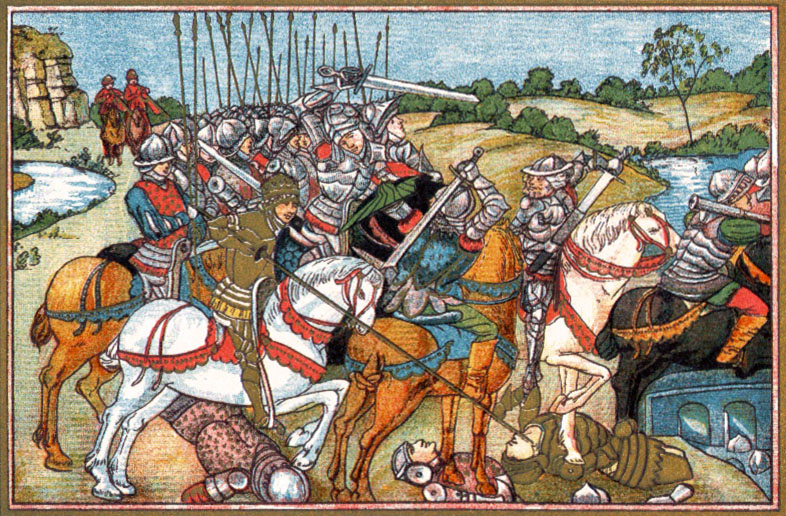
1885 lithograph portraying the rout of Warwick's forces in the manner of Paolo Uccello

Although he had defeated the Neville brothers, Edward had little time to rest; Margaret landed at Weymouth on the day of the battle. She feigned a march to London while augmenting her army with recruits from Wales and the Welsh Marches. The Lancastrian queen was disheartened by the news of Warwick's demise, but Somerset suggested that they were better off without the earl. Despite the defeat at Barnet, Lancastrians who fled from the battle looked to the queen to restore their house to the throne. Alerted by his spies to the Lancastrians' true route, Edward intercepted and defeated them at the Battle of Tewkesbury on 4 May. Gloucester, Clarence and Hastings again fought to defend the Yorkist crown.

Exeter had been stripped of his armour and left for dead on the battlefield at Barnet, but he was alive—though gravely injured. His followers found him and took him to Westminster Abbey. On his recovery, he was imprisoned in the Tower of London for four years before submitting to Edward's rule. Exeter did not participate in the later battles of the Wars of the Roses. Edward sent him on a Yorkist expedition to France in 1475, and the duke was reported to have fallen overboard and drowned without any witnesses.

After withdrawing from the battle, Oxford fled to France and participated in attacks on English ships, continuing his campaign against Yorkist rule. He was captured in 1473 after seizing St Michael's Mount, an island off the southwest coast of England. Twelve years later Oxford escaped from prison and joined Henry Tudor's fight against the Yorkists, commanding the Lancastrian army at the Battle of Bosworth Field in 1485.

== Legacy ==
The Battle of Barnet was an important engagement in the Wars of the Roses: it brought about the death of a prominent figure and secured the throne for another. (Note: Warwick Castle was classified as a national monument and converted to a tourist attraction in the 20th century. One of its major exhibits, "Kingmaker—A Preparation for Battle", features dioramas displaying preparations by the earl and his household for the Battle of Barnet.) Despite its importance to history, contemporary records about the battle are rare. The sole chronicle based on an eyewitness account—The Arrivall of Edward IV—was written by someone within Edward's council, which presents a biased account of the battle. (Note: The Arrivall was written to promote and celebrate Edward's superiority. Besides presenting supernatural approvals of Edward's venture—the miracle of St Anne, it approved Edward's violation of sanctuary after the Battle of Tewkesbury and claimed that Henry VI died just after Tewkesbury, where his sole heir had been killed, due to "pure displeasure and melancoly".) Another first-hand observation was found in the Paston Letters, written by the Lancastrian Sir John Paston. Other records, such as The Warkworth Chronicle, offer only bits and pieces about the battle. Therefore, deficits in historical understanding must be filled through field research and discoveries of mediaeval documents.

Historians theorise that had Warwick's force joined Margaret's before challenging Edward, the combined Lancastrian army would have overwhelmed the Yorkists. Instead, Warwick's defeat gave the Yorkists a victory so decisive that it, along with the Battle of Tewkesbury, secured the English throne for Edward IV. Historian Colin Richmond believes that Edward's return to power was assured at Barnet—Tewkesbury was "merely an epilogue". Without having to contend with Warwick's popularity and political influence, the young Yorkist king could fully exert his will and rule the land unchallenged. Ballads composed during Edward's reign celebrated his victory as sanctioned by God: "Man proposes, oftimes in veyn, But God disposes, the boke telleth pleyn". Barnet was a disaster for the Nevilles; their lands given away and their offices reduced. The family never again reached the prominence in English politics that they had enjoyed before the battle.

=== Shakespearian dramatisation ===
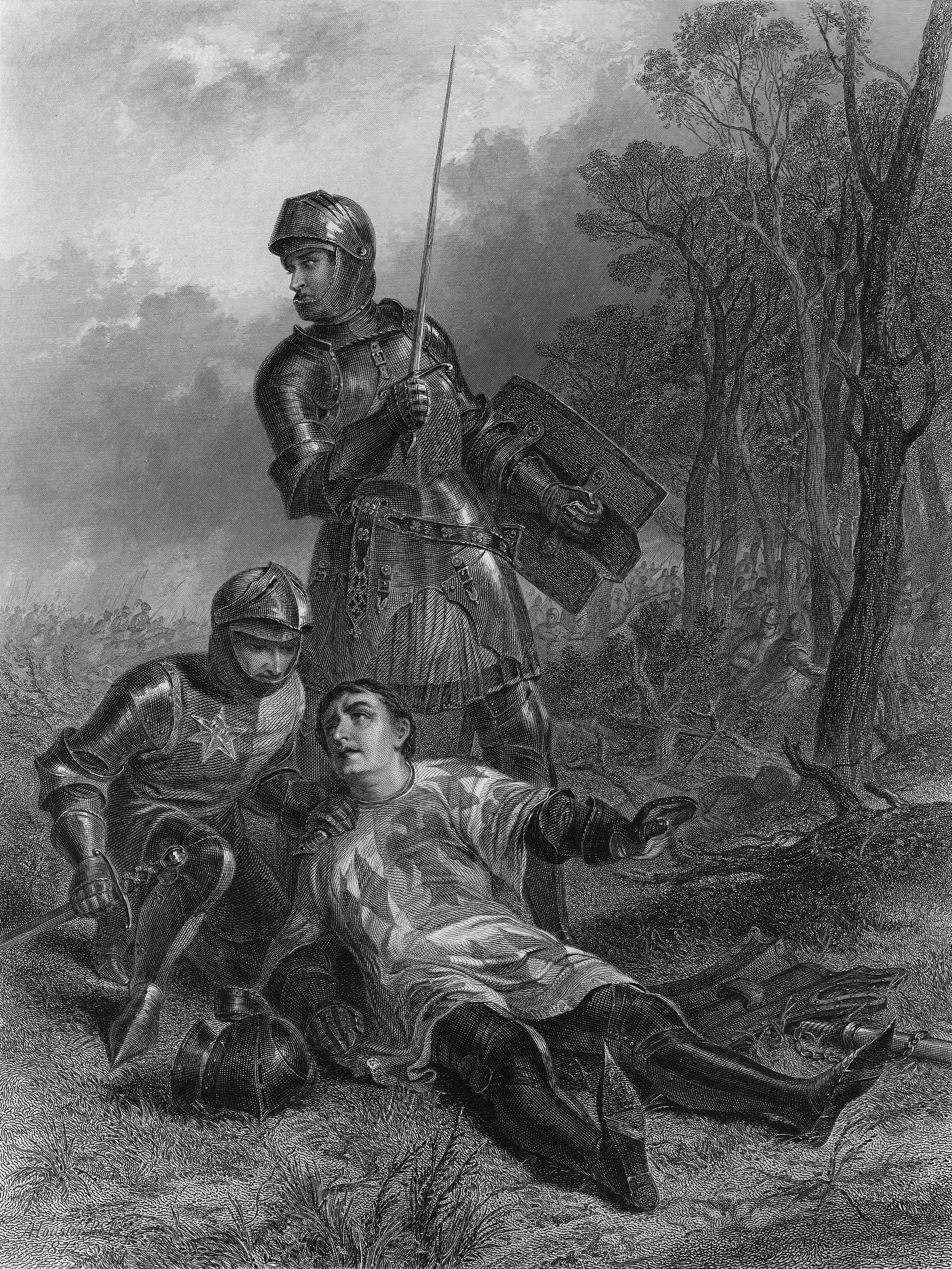
Henry VI, Part 3: Warwick, dying at the Battle of Barnet, speaks his last words.

The battle is alluded to in William Shakespeare's Henry VI, Part 3 (1595). The end of Act V, scene one depicts the events leading up to the battle; scenes two and three portray the conclusion, in which the characters discuss the combat and the fates of its participants. Shakespeare uses few details reported by contemporary chroniclers and ignores notable incidents, such as the confusion over Oxford's and Edward's badges. His play is based mostly on poetic and dramatic sources. In the play, Montagu is killed while trying to save his brother (Shakespeare's source material included Hall's 1548 The Union of the Two Noble and Illustrate Famelies of Lancastre and Yorke), and Warwick is dragged in by Edward IV and left to speak his dying words to Oxford and Somerset. Warwick's death dominates the scenes, reflecting Hall's vivid portrayal of the earl's passing as a valiant death. Furthermore, whereas several chronicles mention Edward's desire to capture Warwick, Shakespeare has the Yorkist king lustily demand Warwick's skin.

Shakespeare presents the Nevilles as brothers who are willing to die for each other, whereas the three sons of York—Edward, Gloucester, and Clarence—are slowly driven apart by their own goals and ideas. Professor of English John Cox suggests that Shakespeare did not share the impression given in post-battle ballads that Edward's triumph was divinely ordained. He argues that Shakespeare's placement of Clarence's last act of betrayal immediately before the battle suggests that Edward's rule stems from his military aggression, luck, and "policy". Shakespeare also explicitly excludes Edward from action sequences, a departure from Hall's depictions.

=== Battlefield ===
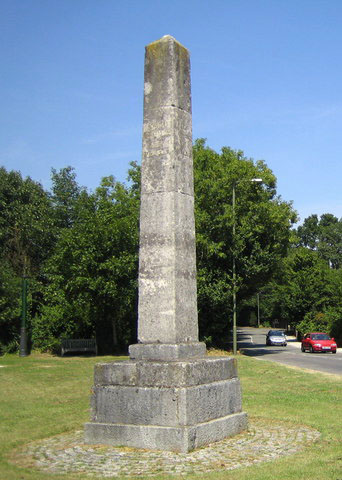
Hadley Highstone, Monken Hadley: an obelisk erected to mark the battle

English Heritage, a government body in charge of conservation of historic sites, roughly locates the battlefield in an area 800 to 1600 metres (0.5 to 1.0 mile) north of the town of Barnet. Over the centuries, much of the terrain has changed, and records of the town's boundaries and geography are not detailed enough for English Heritage or historians to conclude the exact location of the battle. Geographical features corresponding to contemporary descriptions allow approximations of where the fighting took place. (Note: Gravett, however, states that due to the extensive build-up and remodelling of the town, even these elements are suspect and may not correlate to 15th-century features.)

English Heritage suggests that a 15th-century letter from a Hanseatic merchant, Gerhard von Wessel, helps to identify the battlefield via geological features. It mentions a "broad green" which corresponds to Hadley Green, and the marsh on the right flank of the Yorkist line is likely to be in the valley of the Monken Mead Brook. The letter also mentions St Albans road, which has remained largely the same, winding through the fields. Urbanisation over the 18th and 19th centuries, however, has populated much of the area with buildings. By the 20th century, the suburb of Monken Hadley covered part of the fields where the Battle of Barnet was fought. A hedge in the local golf course, as suggested by Lieutenant-Colonel Alfred H. Burne, is likely the row of shrubs behind which Oxford's men lined up and took cover.

In 1740 Sir Jeremy Sambroke erected an obelisk to commemorate the battle about 200 metres (660 ft) south of the junction between the Great North Road and Kitts End Road. It was later moved just north of the junction on the grass between the two roads. Known as Hadley Highstone, it stands 5.5 metres (18 ft) tall and marks its location with the inscription:

"Here was fought the Famous Battle Between Edward the 4th and the Earl of Warwick April the 14th ANNO 1471 in which the Earl was Defeated And Slain."

The battle is referred to in the coat of arms of the London Borough of Barnet which display a red and a silver rose in the top of the shield and two crossed swords in the crest.

Every year, the Barnet Medieval Festival is held at the place where the battle is thought to have occurred. It features a re-enactment of the battle and market stalls.

== Bibliography ==
Books

- Britnell, Richard (1997). "Country Politics". The Closing of the Middle Ages?: England, 1471–1529. Oxford: Blackwell Publishers. ISBN 978-0-631-16598-9.
- Brooke, Richard (1857). "The Field of the Battle of Barnet". Visits to Fields of Battle, in England, of the Fifteenth Century: To which are Added Some Miscellaneous Tracts and Papers Upon Archaeological Subjects. London: John Russell Smith. OCLC 43406489.
- Burne, Alfred (1950). "The Battle of Barnet, April 14th, 1471". The Battlefields of England. London: Methuen and Company. OCLC 3010941.
- Carpenter, Christine (2002) [1997]. The Wars of the Roses: Politics and the Constitution in England, c. 1437–1509. Cambridge Medieval Textbooks. New York: Cambridge University Press. ISBN 978-0-521-31874-7.
- Cox, John (2007). "History and Guilt". Seeming Knowledge: Shakespeare and Skeptical Faith. Texas: Baylor University Press. ISBN 978-1-932792-95-9.
- Edelman, Charles (1992). "The Wars of the Roses: 2 and 3 Henry VI, Richard III". Brawl Ridiculous: Swordfighting in Shakespeare's Plays. Manchester: Manchester University Press. ISBN 978-0-7190-3507-4.
- Goodman, Anthony (1990) [1981]. "Local Revolts and Nobles' Struggles, 1469–71". The Wars of the Roses: Military Activity and English Society, 1452–97. London: Taylor and Francis. ISBN 978-0-415-05264-1.
- Goy-Blanquet, Dominique (2003). "Unhappy Families". Shakespeare's Early History Plays: From Chronicle to Stage. Oxford: Oxford University Press. ISBN 978-0-19-811987-6.
- Gravett, Christopher (22 October 2003). Tewkesbury 1471: The last Yorkist victory (PDF). Campaign. Vol. 131. Oxford: Osprey Publishing. ISBN 978-1-84176-514-3. Archived from the original (PDF) on 27 February 2019.
- Haigh, Philip (1995). The Military Campaigns of the Wars of the Roses (Hardcover ed.). Gloucestershire, United Kingdom: Sutton Publishing. ISBN 978-1-85833-770-8.
- Harriss, Gerald (2007) [2005]. Shaping the Nation: England 1360–1461. Oxford: Oxford University Press. ISBN 978-0-19-921119-7.
- Hicks, Michael (1995). "The Sources". In Pollard, Anthony (ed.). The Wars of the Roses. Problems in Focus. London: MacMillan Press. ISBN 978-0-333-60166-2.
- Hicks, Michael (2002) [1998]. Warwick the Kingmaker. Oxford: Blackwell Publishing. ISBN 978-0-631-23593-4.
- Kettler, Sarah; Trimble, Carole (2003). "Warwickshire". The Amateur Historian's Guide to the Heart of England: Nearly 200 Medieval and Tudor Sites Two Hours or Less from London. Virginia, United States: Capital Books. ISBN 978-1-892123-65-7.
- Martin, Randall; Shakespeare, William (2001). "Introduction". Henry VI: Part Three. Oxford World's Classics. Oxford: Oxford University Press. ISBN 978-0-19-283141-5.
- Richmond, Colin (2000). The Paston Family in the Fifteenth Century: Endings. Vol. 3. Manchester: Manchester University Press. ISBN 978-0-7190-5990-2.
- Ross, Charles (1997) [1974]. Edward IV. Yale English Monarchs (revised ed.). New Haven, Connecticut; and London: Yale University Press. ISBN 978-0-300-07372-0.
- Ross, Charles (1999) [1981]. Richard III. Yale English Monarchs. New Haven, Connecticut; and London: Yale University Press. ISBN 978-0-300-07979-1.
- Royle, Trevor (2008). Lancaster Against York: The Wars of the Roses and the Foundation of Modern Britain. Hampshire, United Kingdom: Palgrave Macmillan. ISBN 978-1-4039-6672-8.
- Seymour, William (1997) [1975]. Battles in Britain and Their Political Background, 1066–1746. Hertfordshire, United Kingdom: Wordsworth Editions. ISBN 978-1-85326-672-0.
- Wise, Terence (1983). The Wars of the Roses. Men-at-Arms Series. Vol. 145. Oxford: Osprey Publishing. ISBN 978-0-85045-520-5.
- Wolffe, Bertram (2001) [1981]. Henry VI. Yale English Monarchs. New Haven, Connecticut; and London: Yale University Press. ISBN 978-0-300-08926-4.

Online sources

- "English Heritage Battlefield Report: Barnet 1471" (PDF). Swindon, United Kingdom: English Heritage. 1995. Archived from the original (PDF) on 27 November 2013.
