= Hayk (given name) =

Hayk, Haik or Ayk (Armenian: Հայկ) is an Armenian masculine given name that may refer to the following notable people:

- Hayk, legendary founder of Armenia
- Hayk Asatryan (1900–1956), Armenian political theorist
- Hayk Babayan (born 1979), Commander of the Armenian RA Police Troops
- Hayk Chobanyan (born 1973), Armenian businessman and former politician
- Hayk Demoyan (born 1975), Armenian historian
- Hayk Ghazaryan (1930—2014), Armenian historian
- Hayk Grigoryan (born 1976), Armenian jurist
- Hayk Gyokchyan (born 1989), Lebanese professional basketball player
- Hayk Gyulikevkhyan (1886–1951), Armenian literary critic and philosopher
- Hayk Hakobyan (born 1980), Armenian football player
- Hayk Harutyunyan (born 1974), Armenian football midfielder
- Haik Hovsepian Mehr (1945–1994), Iranian Armenian Protestant minister and bishop
- Hayk Ishkhanyan (born 1989), Armenian football player
- Ayk Kazaryan (born 1993), Russian football player of Armenian origin
- Hayk Khloyan (born 2001), Armenian Greco-Roman wrestler
- Hayk Kotanjian (born 1945), Armenian military diplomat
- Haik M. Martirosyan (born 2000), Armenian chess player
- Hayk Marutyan (born 1976), Armenian actor, comedian, filmmaker and politician
- Hayk Melikyan (born 1980), Armenian pianist and composer
- Hayk Milkon (born 1993), Football manager of Armenian heritage
- Hayk Mirzayans (1920–1999), Iranian Armenian entomologist
- Haik Nikogosian (born 1955), Armenian physician, politician and a public health expert
- Hayk Ordyan (born 1978), Armenian film director and producer
- Hayk Ovsepyan (1891–1937), Soviet military leader and politician of Armenian origin
- Hayk Yeghiazaryan (born 1972), Armenian weightlifter
