= Hague (disambiguation) =

The Hague is the capital city of the South Holland province of the Netherlands.

Hague may also refer to:

== Organizations ==
International courts based in The Hague, Netherlands are commonly referred to as "The Hague":

- International Court of Justice
- International Criminal Court
- Permanent Court of Arbitration

== People ==
- Albert Hague (1920–2001), German-American songwriter, composer, and actor
- Arnold Hague (1840–1917), American geologist
- Bill Hague (1852–1898), baseball player
- Billy Hague (1885–1969), ice hockey player
- Charles Hague (1769–1821), English musician
- Sir Douglas Hague (1926–2015), British economist
- Florence A. Hague (1886–1971), 16th President General of the Daughters of the American Revolution
- Frank Hague (1876–1956), American politician
- Joan B. Hague, New York assemblywoman 1979–1982
- Joe Hague (1944–1994), American professional baseball player
- Joshua Anderson Hague (1850–1916), British landscape painter
- Keith Hague (born 1946), English professional footballer
- Kevin Hague (born 1960), New Zealand politician
- Matt Hague (born 1985), American professional baseball player
- Mel Hague (1943–2023), British country music singer
- Molly-Mae Hague (born 1999), Love Island contestant
- Michael Hague (born 1948), American illustrator
- Neil Hague (disambiguation), several people
- Nicolas Hague (born 1998), Canadian ice hockey player
- Richard Hague (born 1947), American poet
- Rob Hague, British drummer
- Robert Hague (born 1967), Australian artist
- Sam Hague (19th century), British minstrel troupe owner
- William Hague (disambiguation), several people:

- William Hague, Baron Hague of Richmond (born 1961), British politician.
- William Hague (architect) (1840–1899), Irish architect
- William Hague (Australian politician) (1854–1924), South Australian parliamentarian
- William Hague (boxer) (1885–1951), English boxer
- General William Hague, a character in the television series Babylon 5

== Places ==
=== United States ===
- Hague, Florida
- Hague, New York
- Hague, North Dakota
- Hague, Virginia

=== Other ===
- Hague, Saskatchewan, Canada
- La Hague, France

== See also ==
- Hague Convention (disambiguation)
- Haig (disambiguation)
- Haigh (disambiguation)
