= Haik =

Haik may refer to:

- Haik, Iran, a village in Yazd Province, Iran
- Hayq, Ethiopia, a town in northern Ethiopia
- Hayk (given name)
- Haik (surname)
- Haik (garment), a type of veil
- Proper name of WASP-34b

== See also ==
- Haig (disambiguation)
- Hayek
