= Haigh (surname) =

Haigh (/heɪɡ/) is a surname. Notable people with the surname include:

- Andrew Haigh (born 1973), British film director
- Arthur Haigh (fl. 1920s), British rugby player
- Bernard Parker Haigh (1884–1941), professor at the Royal Naval College who contributed to modern theories of metal fatigue
- Christopher Haigh (born 1944), British historian
- Dan Haigh (born 1980), English musician
- Elizabeth Haigh (born 1988), Singaporean chef
- Emily Haigh (born 1978), Canadian psychologist
- Frank Haigh (fl. 1950s), British rugby player
- Frank Haydn Haigh (1898–1992), New Zealand lawyer and social reformer
- George Henry Caton Haigh (1860–1941), English ornithologist
- Gideon Haigh (born 1965), Australian journalist
- Jennifer Haigh (born 1968), American writer
- John George Haigh (1909–1949), English serial killer
- Kenneth Haigh (1931–2018), English actor
- Louise Haigh (born 1987), British Labour Co-operative politician
- Nancy Haigh (born 1946), American set designer
- Philip A. Haigh (born 1964), British historian and author
- Robin Haigh (born 1993), Irish/British composer
- Schofield Haigh (1871–1921), British cricketer
- Thomas Haigh (1769–1808), English musician

== See also ==
- Hague (disambiguation)
- Haig (surname)
