= Earl Haig =

Peerage of the United Kingdom

Earldom Haig Chief of Clan Haig
- Blazon Arms: Azure a Saltire between two Mullets in chief and base, a Decrescent and Increscent in fess Argent. Crest: A Rock proper. Supporters: Dexter: a Bay Horse caparisoned, thereon mounted a Trooper of the 7th (Queen’s Own) Hussars, habited, armed and accoutred, all proper. Sinister: a Bay Horse caparisoned, thereon mounted a Lancer of the 17th (The Duke of Cambridge’s Own) Lancers, habited, armed and accoutred, all proper.
- Creation date: 18 October 1919
- Created by: King George V
- Peerage: Peerage of the United Kingdom
- First holder: Sir Douglas Haig
- Present holder: Alexander Haig, 3rd Earl Haig
- Heir apparent: None
- Remainder to: 1st Earl's heirs male of the body lawfully begotten
- Subsidiary titles: Viscount Dawick; Baron Haig
- Status: Extant
- Seat: Bemersyde House
- Motto: TYDE WHAT MAY (What will be, will be)

Earl Haig is a title in the peerage of the United Kingdom. It was created in 1919 for Field Marshal Sir Douglas Haig. During the First World War, he served as commander of the British Expeditionary Force on the Western Front in France and Belgium (1915–18). Haig was made Viscount Dawick and Baron Haig, of Bemersyde in the County of Berwick, at the same time he was given the earldom, also in the peerage of the United Kingdom The viscountcy of Dawick is used as a courtesy title by the Earl's son and heir apparent. As of 2022 the titles are held by the first earl's grandson, the third earl, who succeeded his father in 2009.

The family seat is Bemersyde House, near Newtown St. Boswells, Roxburghshire.

The family motto is "Tyde what may", which refers to a 13th-century poem by Thomas the Rhymer which predicted that there would always be a Haig in Bemersyde:

'Tyde what may betyde
Haig shall be Haig of Bemersyde'.

== Lairds of Bemersyde (c.1150) ==
The dates stated denote the period of proprietorship of the respective Lairds.

- Peter de Haga, 1st of Bemersyde (c.1150–1200)
- Peter de Haga, 2nd of Bemersyde (c.1200–28)
- Henry de Haga, 3rd of Bemersyde (c.1228–40)
- Peter de Haga, 4th of Bemersyde (c.1240–80)
- John de Haga, 5th of Bemeryde (c.1280–1326)
- Peter de Haga, 6th of Bemersyde (c.1326–33)
- Henry de Haga, 7th of Bemersyde (1333–68)
- John de Haga, 8th of Bemersyde (1368–88)
- Sir Andrew Haig, 9th of Bemersyde (1388–1414)
- John Haig, 10th of Bemersyde (1414–36)
- Gilbert Haig, 11th of Bemersyde (1436–58)
- James Haig, 12th of Bemersyde (1458–90)
- William Haig, 13th of Bemersyde (1490–1513)
- Robert Haig, 14th of Bemersyde (1513–54)
- Andrew Haig, 15th of Bemersyde (1554–83)
- Robert Haig, 16th of Bemersyde (1583–1602)
- James Haig, 17th of Bemersyde (1602–19)
- Andrew Haig, 18th of Bemersyde (1620–27)
- William Haig, 19th of Bemersyde (1627–36)
- David Haig, 20th of Bemersyde (1636–54)
- Anthony Haig, 21st of Bemersyde (1654–1712)
- Zerubabel Haig, 22nd of Bemersyde (1712–32)
- James Anthony Haig, 23rd of Bemersyde (1732–90)
- James Zerubabel Haig, 24th of Bemersyde (1790–1840)
- James Haig, 25th of Bemersyde (1840–54)
- Barbara Haig, 26th of Bemersyde (1854–73)
- Sophia Haig, 27th of Bemersyde (1873–78)
- Lt.-Col. Arthur Balfour Haig, C.M.G., C.V.O., J.P., 28th of Bemersyde (1878–1921)

== Earls Haig (1919) ==
- Douglas Haig, 1st Earl Haig, 29th of Bemersyde (1861–1928)
- George Alexander Eugene Douglas Haig, 2nd Earl Haig, 30th of Bemersyde (1918–2009)
- Alexander Douglas Derrick Haig, 3rd Earl Haig, 31st of Bemersyde (b. 1961)

== Present peer ==
Alexander Douglas Derrick Haig, 3rd Earl Haig (born 30 June 1961) is the only son of the 2nd Earl and his wife Adrienne Thérèse Morley. He has two older sisters, Lady Adrienne (born 1958) and Lady Elizabeth (born 1959). Styled as Viscount Dawick between 1961 and 2009, he was educated at Stowe School.

In 2003 he was living at Third Farm, Melrose, Roxburghshire. On his father’s death on 9 July 2009, he succeeded to the peerages and became chief of Clan Haig. The family seat is Bemersyde House, near Newtown St Boswells, Roxburghshire.

In 2003, Haig married Jane Grassick, daughter of Donald McCombie Grassick. There is no heir to the peerages.
