= Clan Haig =

Lowland Scottish clan

- Motto: Tyde What May

Profile
- Region: Lowlands

Chief
- Alexander Douglas Derrick Haig
- Earl Haig; Viscount Dawick; Baron Haig of Bemersyde
- Seat: Bemersyde House
Septs of Clan Haig
Hage, Hagg, Hagh, Haig, Haigh

Clan Haig is a Lowlands Scottish clan.

== History ==
=== Origins ===
The 13th century poet, Thomas the Rhymer, made the prophecy Tyde what may, what'er betyde, Haig shall be Haig of Bemersyde. Bemersyde has been in the hands of the Haigs for eight hundred years from the founder, Petrus de Haga, to the present chief. Alexander Nisbet asserted that the Haigs were of Pictish or early British extraction. However, it is evident that the name de Haga is Norman.

Petrus de Haga appears as a witness on a charter of Richard de Morville, who was Constable of Scotland from 1162 to 1188, to Dryburgh Abbey. Petrus is mentioned in several charters as Dominus de Bemersyde (Master of Bemersyde) which is evidence that the family were considerable magnates at that time.

de Haga was amongst the nobles who were charged with the apprehension of John de Bisset for the murder of the Earl of Atholl in 1242.

=== 13th and 14th centuries Wars of Scottish Independence ===
The Haig Barons of Bemersyde swore fealty to Edward I of England and appear on the Ragman Rolls in 1296. However, later they strongly supported the struggle for Scottish Independence and fought for William Wallace at the Battle of Stirling Bridge in 1297. The sixth Haig Laird followed Robert the Bruce to the Battle of Bannockburn in 1314 even though at the time he was only seventeen years old. He was later killed at the Battle of Halidon Hill in 1333.

=== 15th century Clan conflicts ===
In 1449 Gilbert Haig was a commander in the Scottish host that defeated the Earl of Northumberland at the Battle of Sark. Gilbert also opposed the rising power of the Clan Douglas family. Gilbert's son, James Haig, was an adherent of James III of Scotland. When James III was murdered in 1488, Haig was forced into hiding until he could make peace with the young James IV of Scotland.

=== 16th century wars between Scotland and England ===
In 1513 William Haig of Bemersyde was killed at the Battle of Flodden. However, his son, Robert, the 14th Laird, avenged his death at the Battle of Ancrum Moor in 1544, where he captured Lord Evers, an English commander. Lord Evers was wounded and Haig carried him to Bemersyde where he died a few days later and Haig buried him at Melrose Abbey.

=== 17th century ===
During the 17th century the Haigs endured persecution for their religious beliefs. Chief William Haig, the 19th Laird was the King's Solicitor for Scotland during the reigns of James VI of Scotland and Charles I of England. The twenty-first Laird, Anthony Haig was persecuted for his membership of the Society of Friends and suffered a long period of imprisonment. Between 1629 and 1630 four sons of the chief were killed while fighting in the service of the King of Bohemia.

=== 19th century ===
In the 19th century the line of succession looked to be in danger when the succession fell to three unmarried daughters. However, they signed a deed before their death that transferred the succession to a cousin—Colonel Arthur Balfour Haig who was of the Clackmannan branch of the clan and a descendant of the 17th Laird. He became the 28th Laird and Chief of Clan Haig.

== Tower of Bemersyde ==
The ancestral seat of the Haigs, Bemersyde House was originally built in 1535 when its principal purpose was defence. It was improved in 1690 when large windows and fireplaces were introduced. The house was extended in the eighteenth and nineteenth centuries. In 1960 further alterations were carried out by George Haig, 2nd Earl Haig to improve the overall design and proportions of the house.

The lands of Bemersyde have stayed in the possession of the Haig family for eight hundred years, a fact predicted in the thirteenth century by Thomas the Rhymer, who said 'Tyde what may, what’er betyde, Haig shall be Haig of Bemersyde'.

== Clan Chief ==
The current Chief of Clan Haig is the Rt. Hon. Alexander Douglas Derrick Haig, 3rd Earl Haig.

== See also ==
- Scottish clan
