= Historie of the arrivall of Edward IV =

English chronicle

The Historie of the Arrivall of Edward IV. in England and the Finall Recouerye of His Kingdomes from Henry VI. A.D. M.CCCC.LXXI is a chronicle from the period of the Wars of the Roses. As the title implies, the main focus of the work is Edward IV's arrival in England in 1471 to reclaim his crown. On 2 October 1470, King Edward had fled to Flanders in the face of a rebellion by Richard Neville, Earl of Warwick. Warwick set up – as a puppet king – Henry VI, whom he had himself previously helped depose. On the continent Edward received support from Charles the Bold, Duke of Burgundy, and on 14 March 1471 he landed at Ravenspurn in Yorkshire, and started making his way south. On 14 April Edward defeated Warwick at the Battle of Barnet. Warwick was killed and Edward's reign was secured.

The author of the Arrival is unknown, but he identifies himself as a servant of Edward IV. For this reason the chronicle is written from a perspective sympathetic to King Edward, but this also allows the author a unique perspective. He claims that he experienced some of the events described first hand, and learned the rest from people closely involved. The work was also written shortly after the events, and for these reasons it is considered the most authoritative source on the period, more so than e.g. the Croyland Chronicle or the works of Polydore Vergil. The chronicle exists in two versions; in addition to the full, official one there is also an abridged version in French. This version was sent to the citizens of Bruges, the city where Edward had resided in exile, in appreciation of their hospitality.
