= National Defense Research University =

- Ազգային պաշտպանության հետազոտական համալսարան
- Type: Military institution of higher education
- Established: 2016; 10 years ago
- Director: Major General Genadi Tavaratsyan (appointed on 27 October 2018)
- Location: Karapet Ulnetsu Street, Kanaker-Zeytun District, Yerevan, Armenia
- Language: Armenian, Russian

The National Defense Research University (NDRU) (Armenian: Ազգային պաշտպանության հետազոտական համալսարան) is a higher educational institution of the Armed Forces of Armenia. It is roughly the equivalent of to the American National Defense University in Washington, D.C.

== Overview ==
The NDRU was established on 28 January 2016. It was founded on the basis of the Institute for National Strategic Studies of the Ministry of Defence. The project for the establishment of NDRU in Armenia was elaborated and reviewed at the US National Defense University in 2003-2004 during Colonel Hayk Kotanjian's fellowship. The goal of the university is to increase the efficiency of the Armenian defense security system through bridging research and educational activities as well as to produce research in the areas of regional security dynamics and cyber security among others. In the course of its activities, NDRU has developed close academic-educational ties with world leading centers in security policy realm, notable, the US National Defense University, Harvard University, the Moscow State institute of International Relations, the Russian Presidential Academy of National Economy and Public Administration, Jean Moulin University Lyon 3, and the Chatham House.

=== NDRU Structure ===
The general structure of the NDRU includes two parts: the Drastamat Kanayan Institute for National Strategic Studies and the Academic-Publishing Center.

==== Drastamat Kanayan Institute for National Strategic Studies ====
The Drastamat Kanayan Institute for National Strategic Studies (INSS) was established in 2005 within the frameworks of the National Defense Research University as the research component of the university, being its organizational backbone. It was officially opened in early 2007. The INSS has continued its activities within the university since it was established in 2016. In 2006, the INSS was the academic coordinator of the inter-agency structure of Armenia's first national security strategy. The INSS is the only state funded think tank. It consists of two parts: the Center for Regional Strategic Analyses and the Center for National Security Policy and Information-Communication.

==== Academic-Publishing Center and Haikakan Banak ====
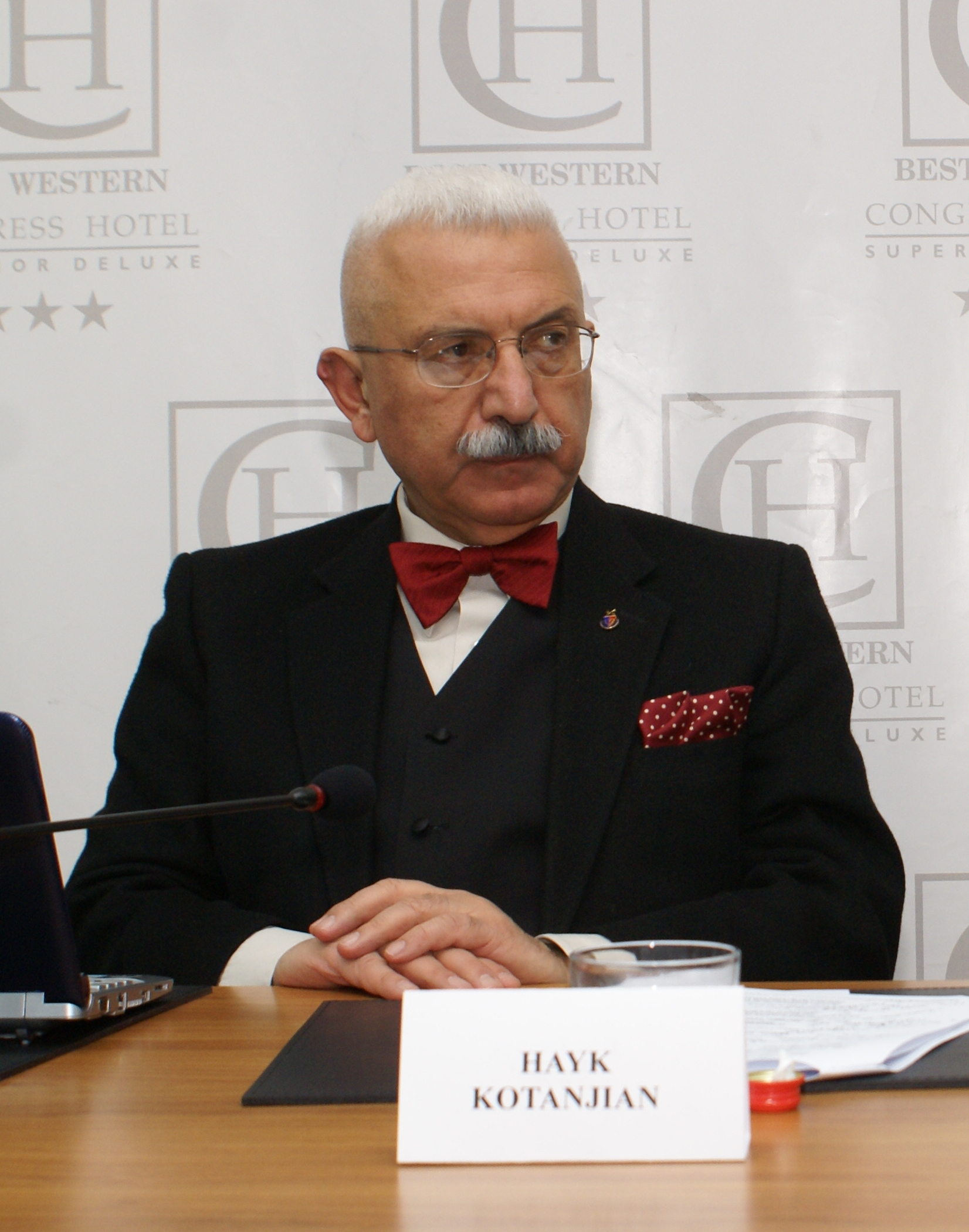
Lieutenant General Hayk Kotanjian in November 2011.

The Academic-Publishing Center is one of the sub-units located at the NDRU. It facilitates the promulgation of the advanced defense-academic thought as well as the publication of NDRU research. Haikakan Banak is the defense-academic journal of the NDRU and the entire armed forces. It was established on 11 October 1994, by then Defense Minister Serzh Sargsyan’s order on the recommendation of the First Deputy Defense Minister and Chief of the General Staff Norat Ter-Grigoryants. The process of creating the journal were assigned to Colonel Hayk Kotanjian. The goal of the journal is to form an army-society liaison as well as elaborate on Armenian defense-academic terminology by covering a wide range of topics in various fields of military affairs. Publications have been exported to the CSTO Joint Staff and to the George C. Marshall European Center for Security Studies.

The editors-in-chief of the journal were the following officers:

- Colonel Hayk Kotanjian (1994–1998)
- Colonel Arkady Sargsyan (1998–2005)
- Colonel Davit Chilingaryan (since 2005)

== See also ==
- National Defense University (Kazakhstan)
- PLA National Defence University
- List of universities in Armenia
