= Haik (surname) =

Haik, Haick, al-Haik or Haïk is the surname of the following notable people:

- Aldo Haïk (born 1952), French chess player
- Hossam Haick (born 1975), Arab-Israeli scientist and engineer
- Jacques Haïk (1893–1950), French film producer
- Katherine Haik, Miss Teen USA 2015
- Mac Haik, American football player, wide receiver
- Mohammed al-Haik, Moroccan poet and musician
- Mohammad Al-Haik, Saudi Arabian football player
- Netanel Haik (born 1981), Israeli politician
- Richard T. Haik (born 1950), American U.S. District Judge
- Suzanne Haik Terrell (born 1954), American politician
- Suzanne Haïk-Vantoura (1912–2000), French organist and composer
- Ted Haik (born 1945), American attorney and politician

== See also ==
- Hayek
