= Jack Haig =

Jack Haig can refer to:

- Jack Haig (actor) (1913-1989), English actor
- Jack Haig (cyclist) (born 1993), Australian cyclist
