= Christopher Gravett =

British curator and medievalist

- Occupations: Curator, Royal Armouries
- Writing career
- Subjects: Military history Middle Ages; Arms & Armour

Christopher Gravett is a former senior curator of armour at the Tower Armouries specialising in the arms and armour of the medieval world.

Gravett has written a number of books and acts as an advisor for film and television projects.

== Selected works ==
- (1985) German Medieval Armies, 1300-1500, Osprey Publishing, ISBN 0-85045-614-2
- (1993) The Norman Knight, 950-1204 AD, Osprey Publishing, ISBN 1-85532-287-0
- (1997) Medieval German Armies, 1000-1300, Osprey Publishing, ISBN 1-85532-657-4
- (1999) Bosworth 1485: Last Charge of the Plantagenets, Osprey Publishing, ISBN 1-85532-863-1
- (2000) Hastings 1066, Osprey Publishing, ISBN 1-84176-133-8
- (2001) The History of Castles: Fortifications Around the World, Lyons Press, ISBN 1-58574-435-2
- (2002) English Medieval Knight 1300-1400, Osprey Publishing, ISBN 1-84176-145-1
- (2002) English Medieval Knight 1200-1300, Osprey Publishing, ISBN 1-84176-144-3
- (2003) Towton 1461: England's Bloodiest Battle, Osprey Publishing, ISBN 1-84176-513-9
- (2003) Tewkesbury 1471: The Last Yorkist Victory, Osprey Publishing, ISBN 1-84176-514-7
- (2003) Norman Stone Castles: British Isles 1066-1216, Osprey Publishing, ISBN 1-84176-602-X
- (2004) Norman Stone Castles (2): Europe 950-1204, Osprey Publishing, ISBN 1-84176-603-8
- (2006) The Normans: Warrior Knights and Their Castles, Osprey Publishing, ISBN 1-84603-088-9
- (2006) Castles and Fortifications from Around the World, Thalamus Publishing, ISBN 1-902886-08-9
- (2006) Tudor Knight, Osprey Publishing, ISBN 1-84176-970-3
- (2007) The Castles of Edward I in Wales 1277-1307, Osprey Publishing, ISBN 1-84603-027-7
- (2020) The Medieval Knight, Osprey Publishing, ISBN 1-47284-358-4

=== Children's books ===
- (2002) Eyewitness Guides: Castle, Dorling Kindersley, ISBN 0-7513-4740-X
- (2003) Eyewitness Guides: Knight, Dorling Kindersley, ISBN 0-7513-6756-7
- The World of the Medieval Knight,

=== Collaborations ===
with David Nicolle:

- (2006) The Normans: Warrior Knights and their Castles, Osprey Publishing
- (2006) Battles of the Middle Ages, Greenwood Press, ISBN 0-275-98837-6
