= Robert Hague =

Australian artist

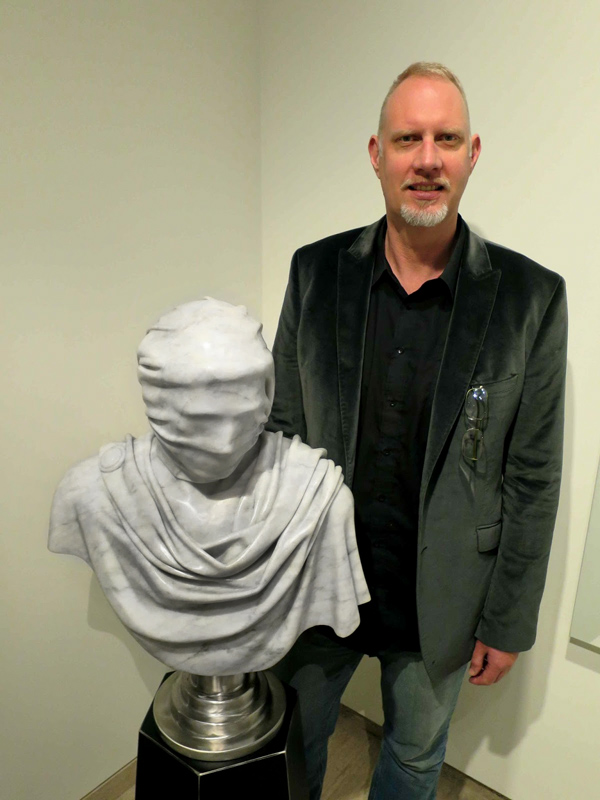
- (2015)
- Born: 18 October 1967 (age 59); Rotorua, New Zealand
- Known for: Sculpture
- Website: http://www.roberthague.com

Robert Hague (born 1967, Rotorua, NZ), is an Australian artist living and working in Melbourne, Victoria. He is best known for his metal and marble sculpture and his detailed lithographic print work.

== Biography ==
Hague migrated to Australia in 1985 and at first exhibited painting (Rotorua Art Prize, Caulfield Art Prize) before concentrating on sculpture. His first sculpture exhibition was titled "Why Not?" at Tap Gallery in Sydney, which included the artists James Powditch] and Mark Booth, among others. In 1998 he exhibited at the fledgling Sculpture by the Sea and in 1999 was awarded the inaugural Sculpture by the Sea, Director's Prize. From 1996 - 2000 he exhibited at Defiance Gallery including the Miniature shows "The Defiant 6"", "Big Thoughts, Small Works" and "The Importance of being Tiny" with King St Gallery. In 2001 he joined Stella Downer Fine Art at the newly opened Danks Street Gallery Complex.

From 1999 to 2003 he was workshop assistant to senior sculptor Ron Robertson-Swann OAM (formally assistant to sculptor Henry Moore (1898-1986)), with his first solo exhibitions in 2003 at Lister Calder Gallery, Stella Downer Fine Art and the Mosman Art Gallery. He has since exhibited in more than 120 group and solo shows and is represented in both public and corporate collections in Australia and overseas.

In 2013 a ten-year retrospective of his work was held by Deakin University Gallery in Melbourne, including the publication 'Deca' with essays by Ashley Crawford and Ken Scarlett. In 2014 a biographical film was produced by Peter Lamont called Uncertain Ciphers and includes interviews with the art critics Andrew Frost, Ken Scarlett and art dealer Lisa Fehily.

More recently, Hague was shortlisted for the 2015 Wynne prize at the Art Gallery of NSW, and the 2016 Blake Prize at the Casula Powerhouse, winning the Established Artist Residency. In 2016 the marble sculpture Shutdown was acquired by the National Gallery of Victoria from the exhibition 'Inaugural' at Nicholas Projects.

== Lithography ==
In 2012 Hague began a series of lithographic prints with master printmaker Peter Lancaster at his Melbourne print studios, Lancaster Press
In 2016 the 'plate series' was acquired by the National Gallery of Australia.
Following the National Gallery of Victoria print commission for Melbourne Now 2022, Hague began his own small Newport print studio.

== Commissions ==
Significant commissions include Stride Orbis (2013) a 65 tonne concrete sculpture for Form700 head offices, Melbourne. Sol, Repose, One Mile and Skel (2010) for the Polo Club Hotel, Tianjin, China. West Orbis (2009) 4m sculpture for Chadstone Shopping Centre. Decent (2007) for the 50th Anniversary, Thredbo, Mt Kosciusko. Genus (2005) Macquarie Group Sovereign Centre foyer, 99 Bathurst St, Sydney. Fervor (2005) Four Seasons Hotel foyer, Hong Kong. Orbis (2005) Emporio Apartments foyer, Sussex St, Sydney. NSW and The Ocean Series (2001) 20 sculpture, patron commission for Sculpture by the Sea, Sydney.

== Awards ==
- 2016: The Blake Prize, Established Artist Residency, Sydney
- 2011: Lorne Sculpture 2011 small sculpture Award Lorne, Vic
- 2010: Deakin University contemporary small sculpture award, Melbourne.
- 2009: Yarra Trams Award, Toorak Sculpture Prize. Melbourne.
- 2000: Waverley Art Prize, Sculpture. Sydney.
- 1999: The Director's Prize, Sculpture by the Sea, Sydney Sydney.

== Collections ==
- National Gallery of Australia
- National Gallery of Victoria
- National Library of Australia
- Tasmanian Museum & Art Gallery
- Art Gallery of NSW, Members, Sydney
- Geelong Art Gallery
- Gippsland Art Gallery
- The Consulate of Malawi, Melbourne
- Deakin University Art Collection, Melbourne
- Edith Cowan University, Perth
- St John of God Hospital, Perth
- Poly Club Hotel, Tianjin, China
- Kosciuszko Thredbo Pty Ltd, Thredbo
- Four Seasons Hotel, Hong Kong
- Chadstone Shopping Centre, Melbourne
- Emporio Apartments, Sydney
- Concept Blue Apartments, Melbourne
- Top of the Town Apartments, Sydney
- Sovereign Centre, Sydney
- Leopold, Melbourne
- Form700 corporate offices, Melbourne
- Bulknet Pty Ltd, Sydney
- Baillieu & Sarah Myer
- John & Pauline Gandel
- Morry Fraid
- Smorgon Collection
- Marco Belgiorno-Zegna
- Armando Percuoco
- Tetsuya Wakuda
- Helen Turner
- Rosemary Foot
- Tony Geddes
- Ron Kaplan

== Gallery - Timeline ==
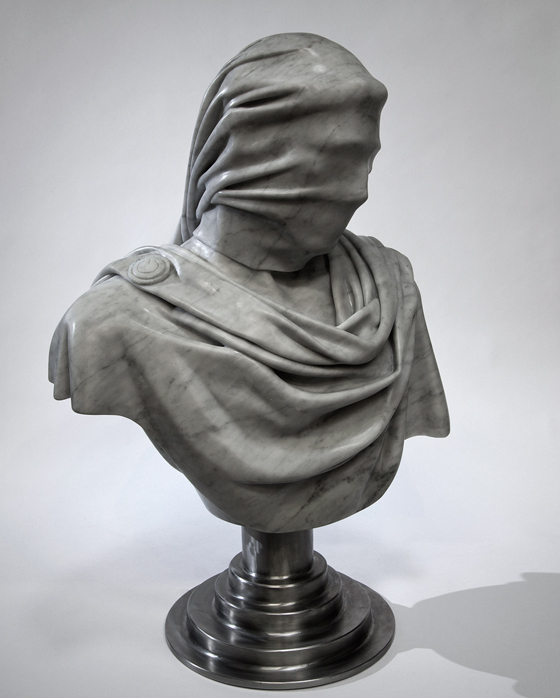
Shutdown. (2015)

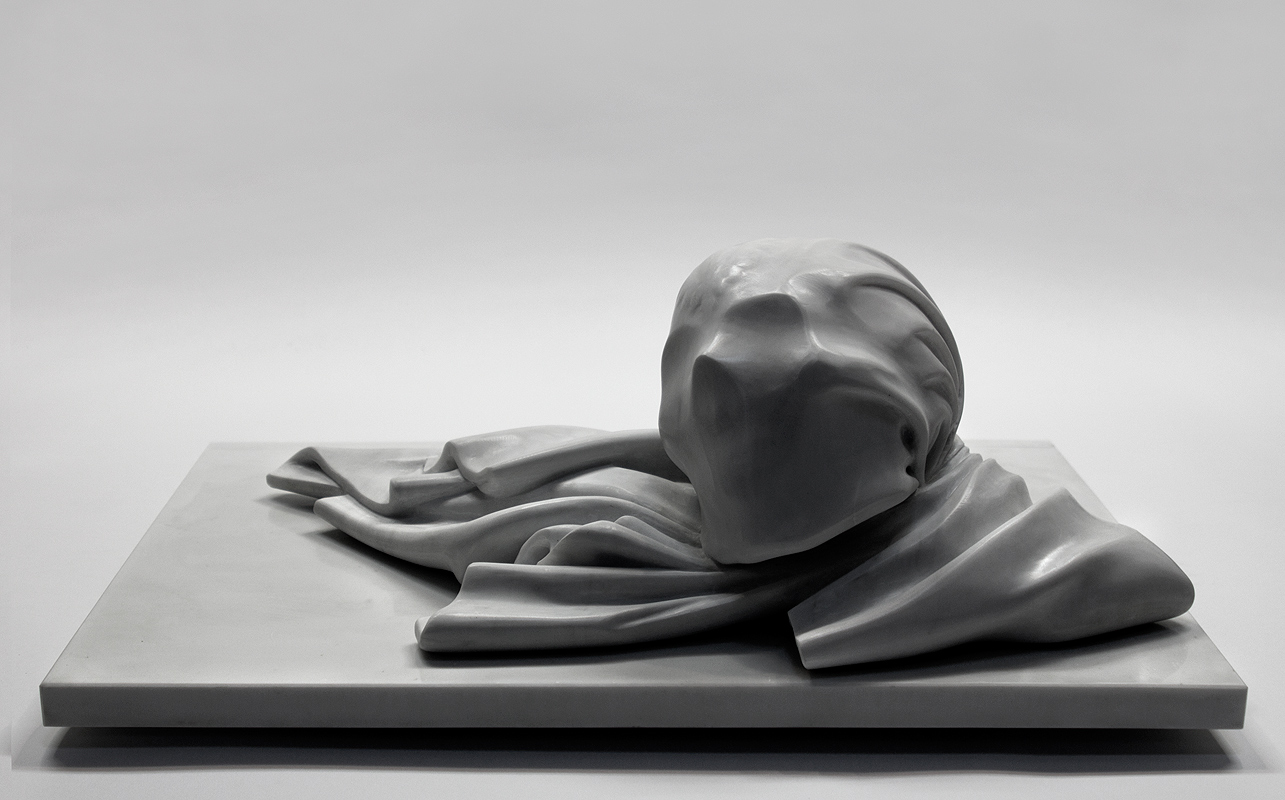
Mona Lisa's Curse. (2014)

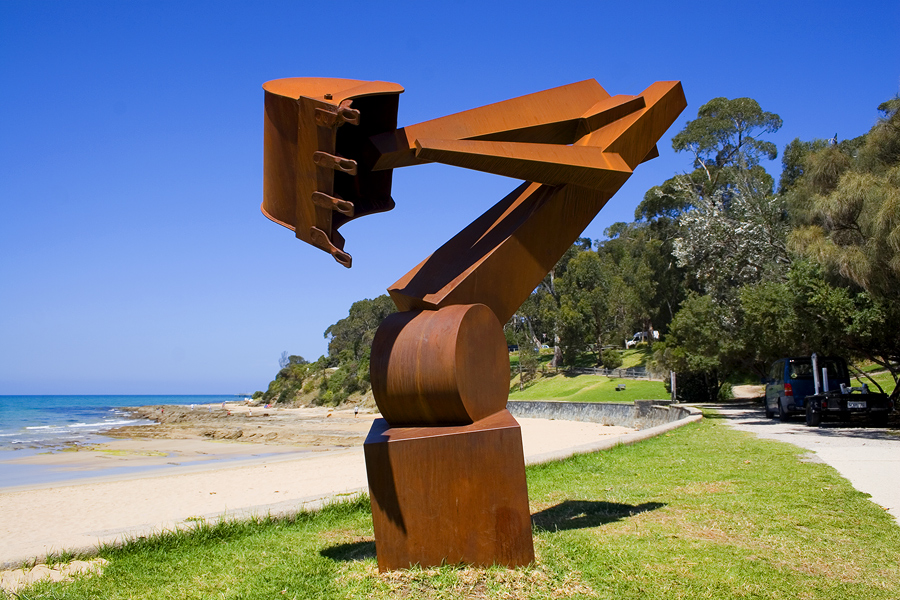
Monument. (2011)

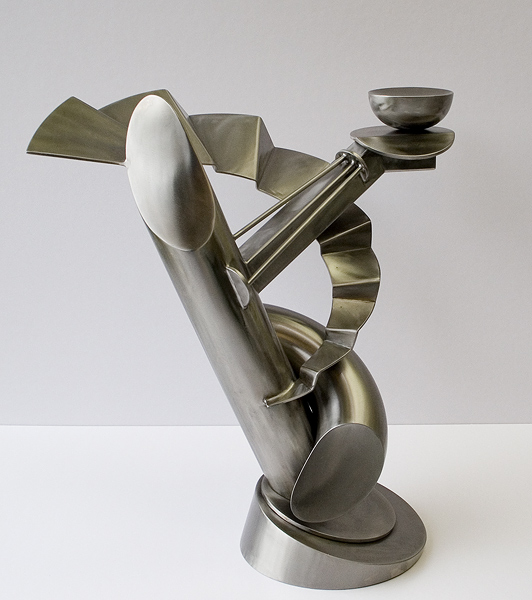
Sensu. (2009)

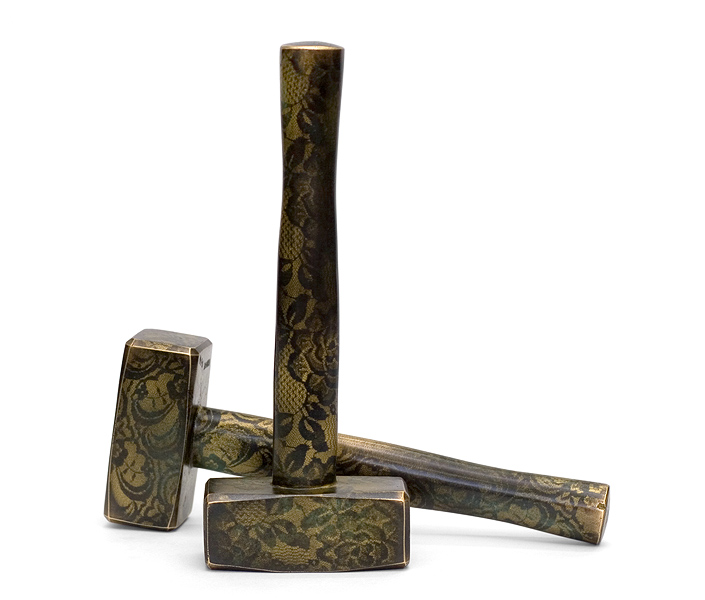
Deca. (2008)
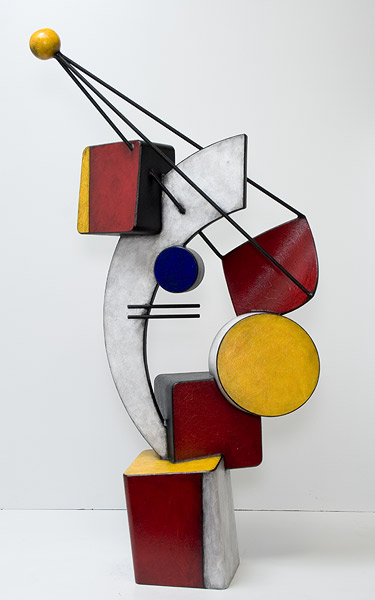
Composition IV. (2004)

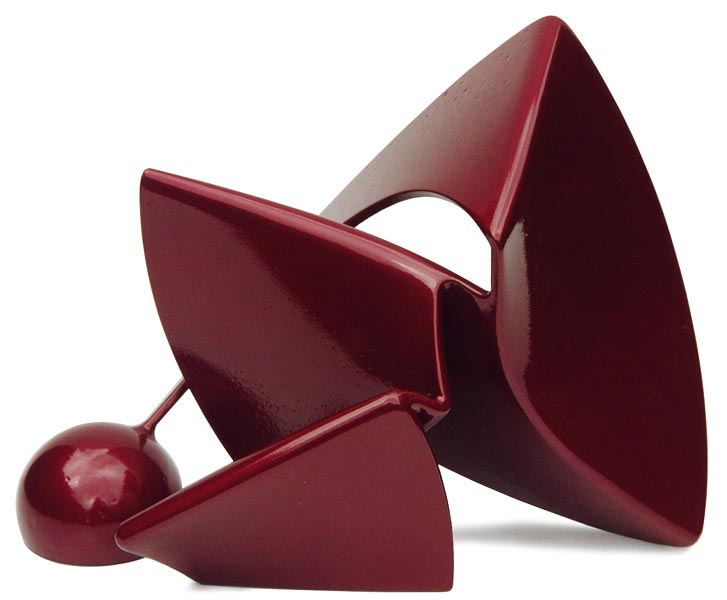
Low. (2003)

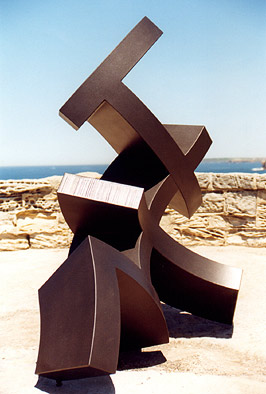
Full Circle. (1999)

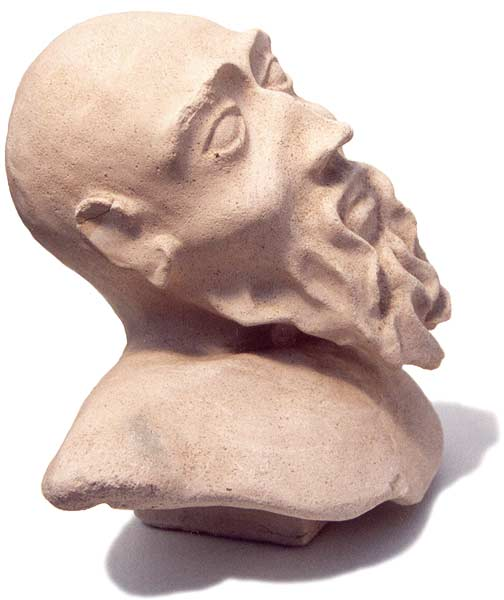
Hedon. (1992)

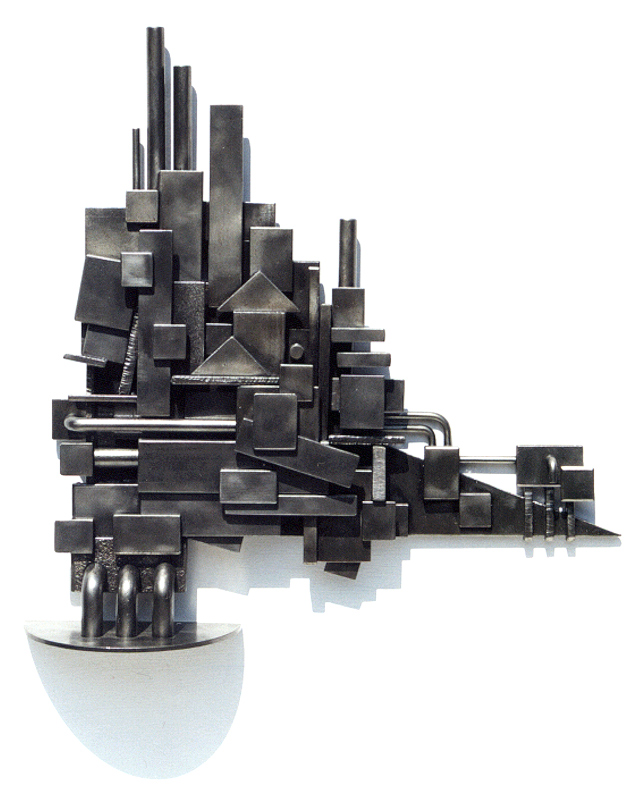
Dencity. (1997)
