= Arthur Balfour Haig =

British politician (1840–1925)

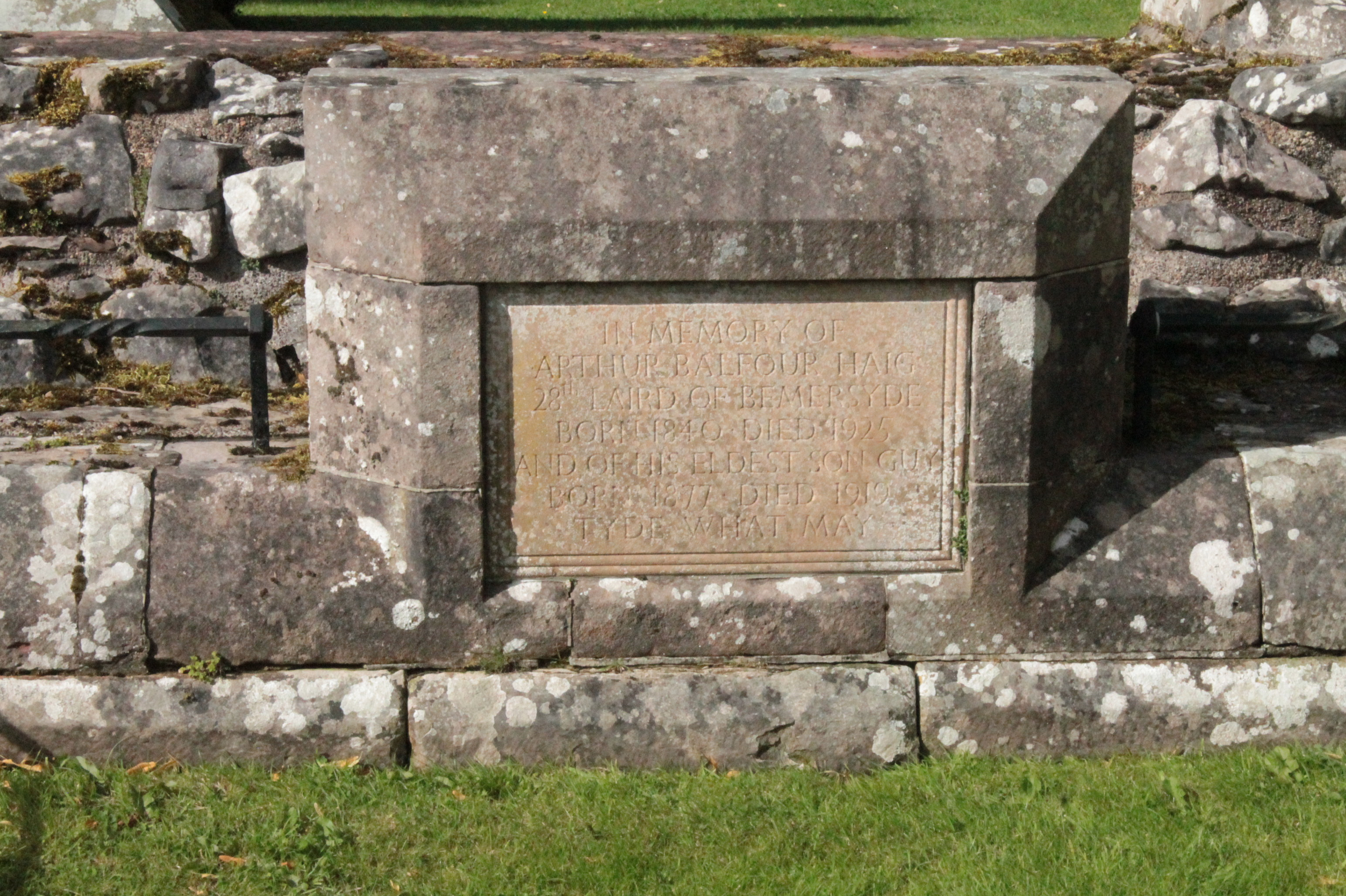
The grave of Arthur Balfour Haig, Dryburgh Abbey

Lieutenant-Colonel Arthur Balfour Haig, CMG, CVO (10 July 1840 – 15 April 1925) was a British Army officer, courtier, and Conservative Party political agent.

A second cousin of Field-Marshal the Earl Haig, Arthur Balfour Haig was educated at Rugby School and the Royal Military Academy, Woolwich. Commissioned into the Royal Engineers in 1859, he came to the notice of Queen Victoria and served in the household of Prince Alfred, Duke of Edinburgh and later Duke of Saxe-Coburg and Gotha, from 1864 until Prince Alfred's death in 1900. In April 1902 Haig was appointed an extra equerry to King Edward VII, and after the King′s death, he was appointed to a similar position to his successor King George V.

Haig was appointed a Commander of the Royal Victorian Order (CVO) in the November 1902 Birthday Honours list, and was invested with the insignia by King Edward VII at Buckingham Palace on 18 December 1902.

Having served as Conservative Party agent for Scotland for 15 years, Haig was Principal Agent of the Conservative Party from 1905 to 1906.

He was the 28th Laird of Bemersyde, head of Clan Haig, and the father of Nigel Haig.

He is buried at Dryburgh Abbey.
