= Hayk Gyulikevkhyan =

Armenian literary critic and philosopher

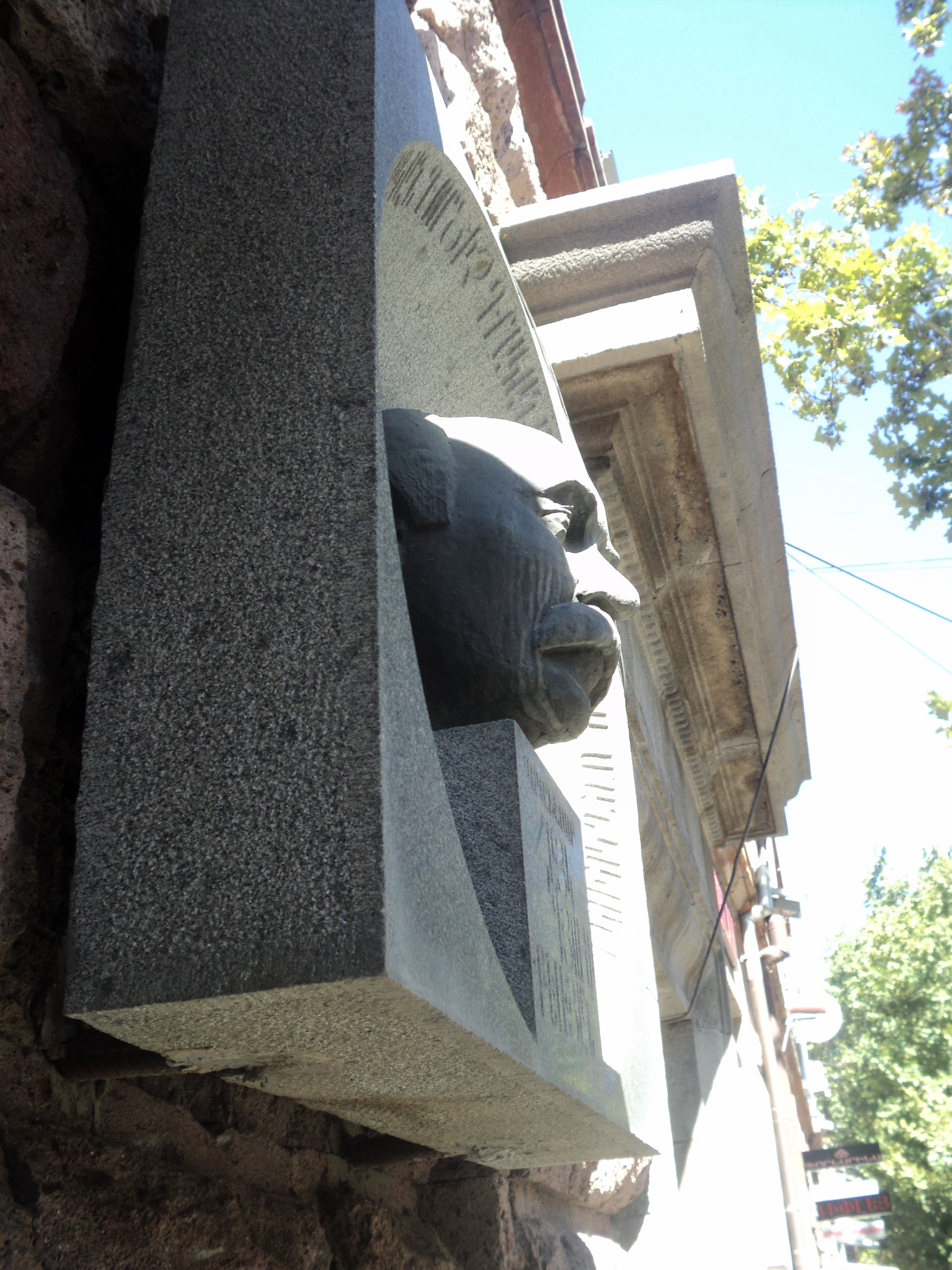

Hayk Gyulikevkhyan (Armenian: Հայկ Գյուլիքևխյան, 1886, Shushi - 1951, Yerevan) was an Armenian literary critic and philosopher and Professor of Yerevan State University. He was one of the founders of Soviet Armenian literary criticism.

== Biography ==
He studied at Leipzig and Zurich universities, then graduated from the department of philosophy of Heidelberg University. Gyulikevkhyan cooperated with Karl Liebknecht and Rosa Luxemburg. For his political activities he was arrested in 1914. In 1920's he became the editor of "Kommunist" newspaper of Yerevan and worked in Alexandropol. Gyulikevkhyan was the pro-rector of Yerevan State University and director of Armenian SSR Marxism–Leninism Institute. He was arrested during the Great Purge, then released.

== Sources ==
- Armenian Concise Encyclopedia, Ed. by acad. K. Khudaverdian, Yerevan, 1990, p. 664
