= Jimmy Haig (footballer) =

Scottish footballer

Personal information
- Full name: James Halliburton Haig
- Date of birth: 1876
- Place of birth: Rothesay, Scotland
- Date of death: 1943 (aged 66–67)
- Position: Wing half

Senior career*
Years	Team	Apps	(Gls)
1896–1897	Rothesay Royal Victoria		
1897–1898	St Mirren		
1898–1899	Derby County	3	(0)
1899–1900	Kilbarchan		
1900–1908	Chesterfield Town	228	(2)
Total		231	(2)
- * Club domestic league appearances and goals

James Halliburton Haig (1876–1943) was a Scottish footballer who played in the Football League for Chesterfield Town and Derby County.
