= Hayk Ordyan =

Armenian director

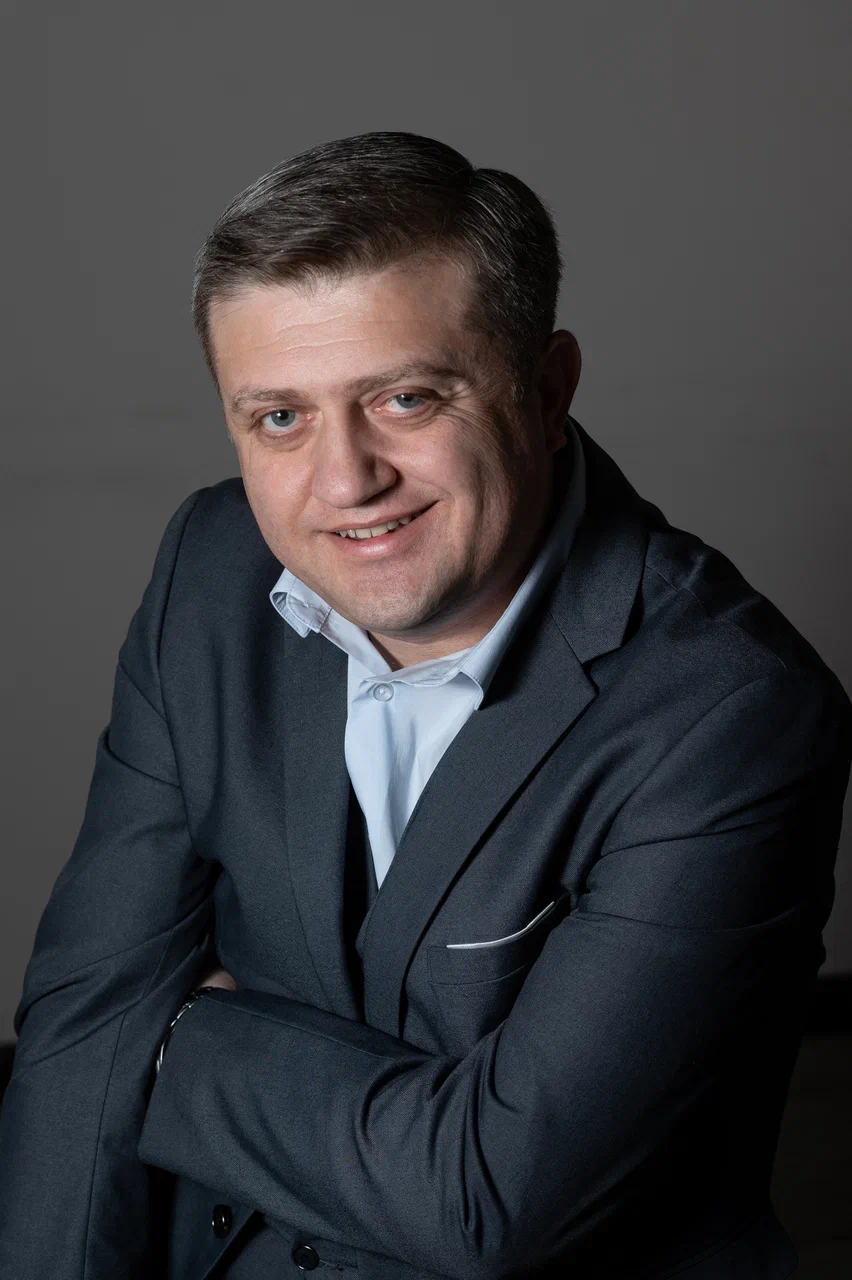
- Born: December 3, 1978 (age 47); Yerevan, Armenia
- Occupations: director, producer.

Hayk Ordyan (Armenian: Հայկ Օրդյան, December 3, 1978, Yerevan), Armenian director, producer.

== Biography ==
Hayk Ordyan was born in 1978 in Yerevan. From 1996-2001 he studied in Armenian State Pedagogical University after Khachatur Abovian (Faculty of Culture). Starting during his student years he worked in the Public Television of Armenia. Over the years, he was the director of news and documentary projects on Armenian TV channels. Since 2011, as a director, he has collaborated with various international TV channels, where he mainly shoots documentaries. From 2008-2016 he has lectured in the Armenian State Pedagogical University after Khachatur Abovian and in Russian-Armenian (Slavonic) University. From 2019, he has been teaching at the Yerevan State Institute of Theatre and Cinematography. Since 2019, he has been the founder and director of the production company ORDER FILM, where he makes feature and documentary films. In 2021, the premiere of the director's movie “Zulali” took place in Yerevan. It later achieved international success, winning many awards.

== Filmography ==
=== Documentary ===
- 2004 - "The Story of Armenian Wine"
- 2004 - "Anonymous graves"
- 2007 - "Frunzik Mkrtchyan. life on tape"
- 2009 - "The Poet of Cinema: Artavazd Peleshyan"
- 2012 - "Edward Ghazaryan: Miracle Worker"
- 2015 - "Genocide. Beginning" (with Stanislav Sidorov)
- 2023 - "Before the beautiful break. Ohan Duryan"

=== Documentary series ===
- 2016 - "The Keepers of Leopard Land"
- 2017 - "Revolution Live"
- 2017 - "This is China"
- 2018 - "Argentinian DNA"
- 2018 - "Bolivian DNA"
- 2019 - "Russo-Latino. Peru"

=== Feature ===
- 2014 - “Agony” (short)
- 2021 - “Zulali”
- Upcoming - "Spring behind the door"

== Awards ==
- 2022 - Cinema without barriers- “The Best Film about Kids” (Zulali)
- 2023 - Festival Universine Nantes - "Peoples choice" (Zulali)
- 2023 - Orvinio cinema film festival - “The best international film” (Zulali)
