= Hayk Kotanjian =

Armenian diplomat and academic (born 1945)

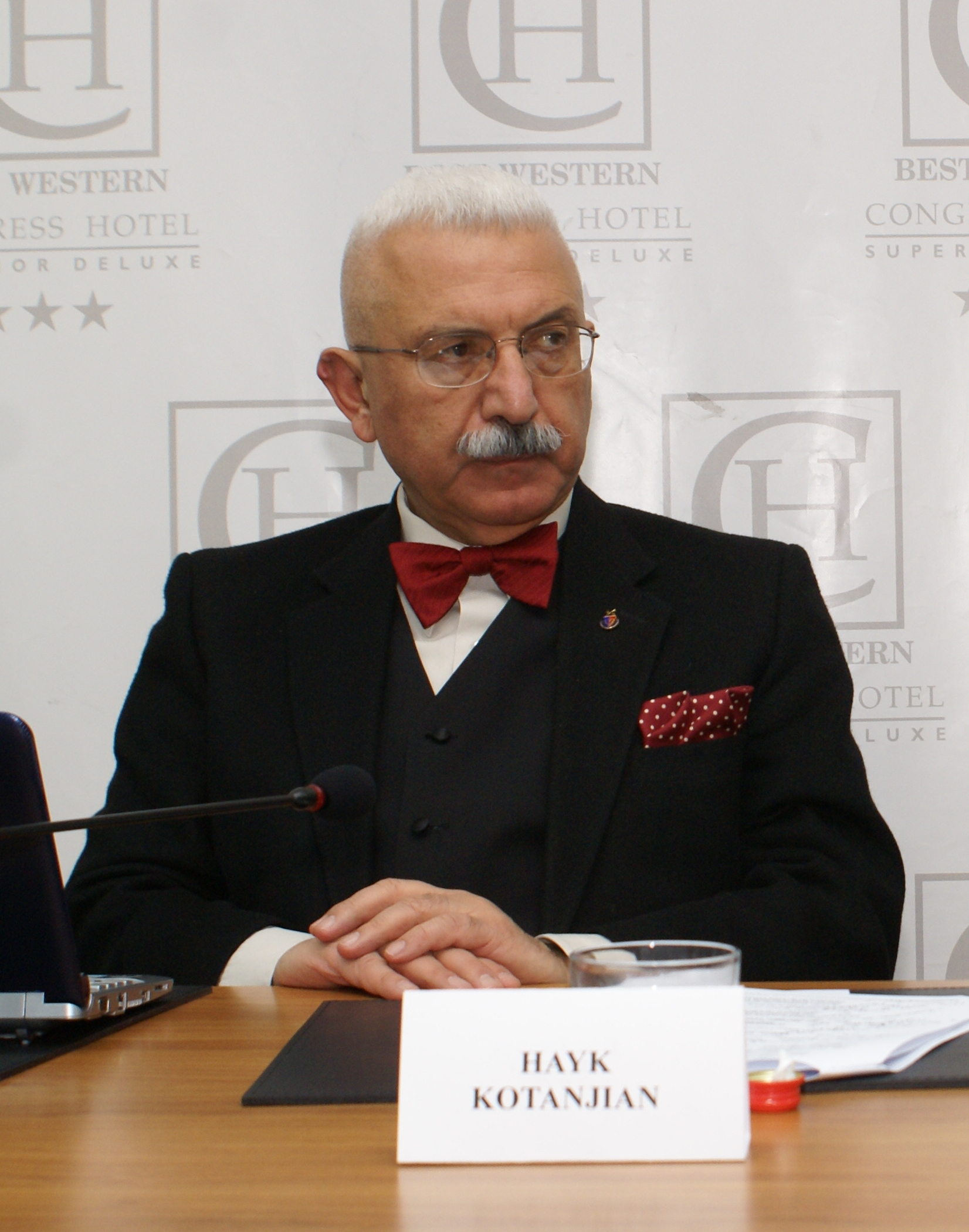
Hayk Kotanjian in November 2011.

Hayk Sargsi Kotanjian (Armenian: Հայկ Սարգսի Քոթանջյան, born in 1945 in Leninakan, Armenian SSR, Soviet Union) is an Armenian military diplomat, academic and political adviser. Kotanjian is the author of several monographs in Russian, English and German as well as numerous articles on crisis management, ethnic conflict, security, defense and strategic studies, and cyberpsychology. Since 2005, he has headed the Institute for National Strategic Studies (INSS) in Yerevan and since 2016 has been the Head of the National Defense Research University. He also chairs the Political Science Association and the Board of Conferment of Academic Degrees in Political Science and International Relations of the National Academy of Sciences of Armenia.

== Biography ==
In 19th century, his ancestors came to Kars and then to Aleksandrapol from the mountain regions of Western Armenia. His grandfather Ararat Avoyan and his great grandfather Sotnik Melkon were officers in the Russian Imperial Army and cavaliers of the Cross of Saint George. In 1971, Kotanjian graduated from the Technical Cybernetics Department of the Yerevan Polytechnic Institute.

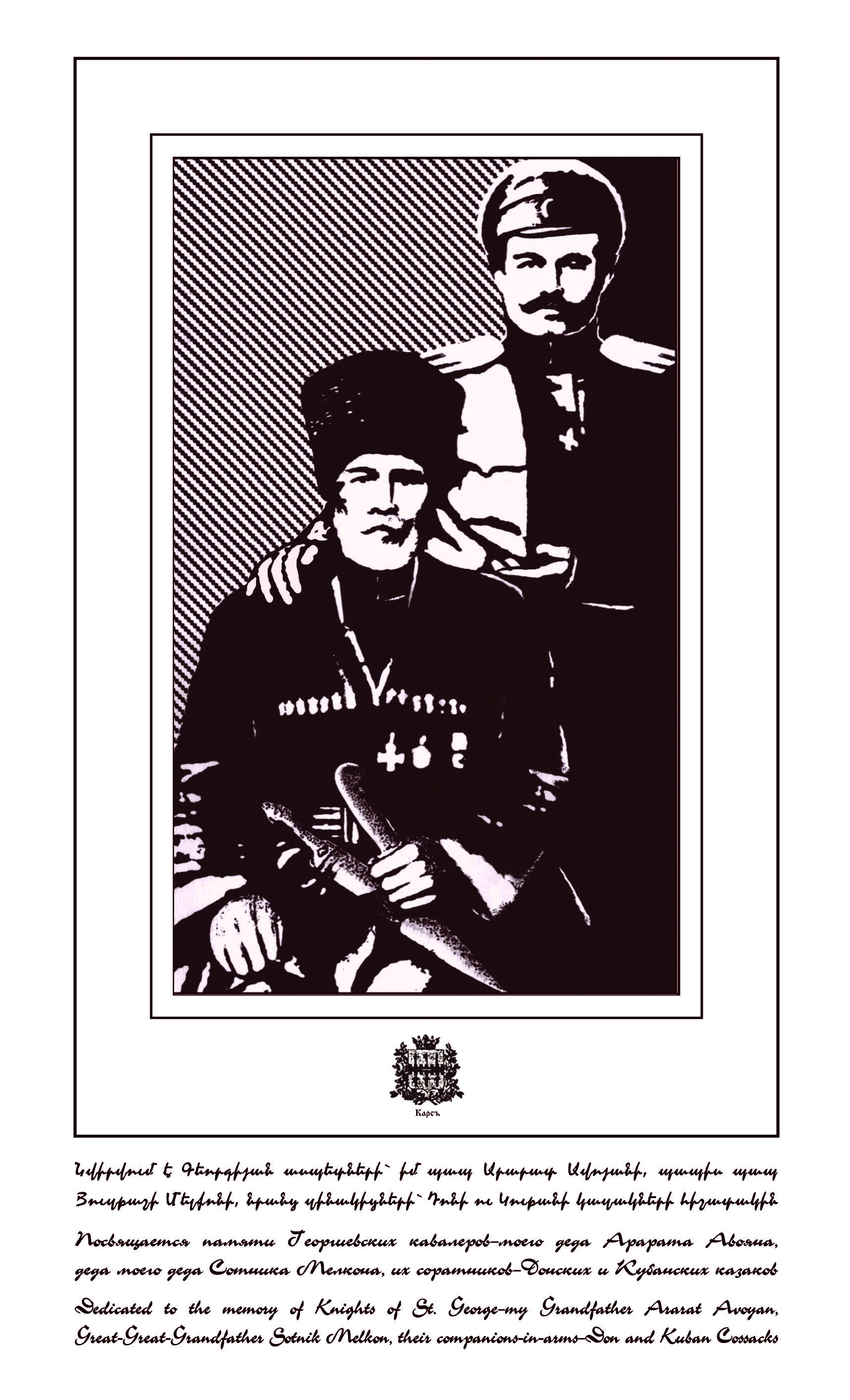
Kotanjian's grandfather and great grandfather.

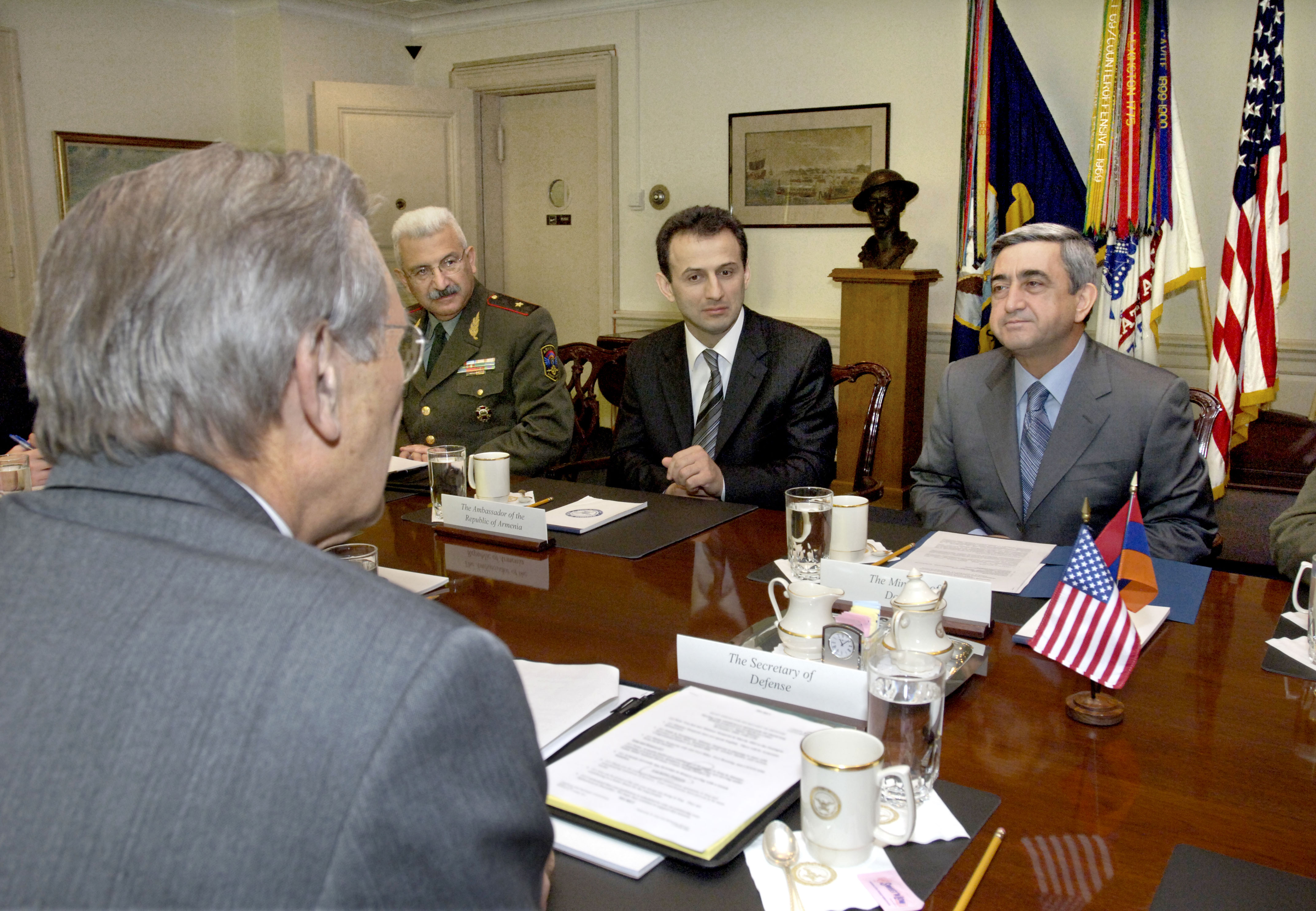
Minister of Defence Serzh Sargsyan (right) and Military Advisor to the Minister of Defense Kotanjian (left-center) during a meeting with Secretary Donald Rumsfeld (foreground).

== Military career ==
Kotanjian has been serving in Armenian Armed Forces since 1992 and before that he was conscript in Soviet Navy. He holds the military rank of Lieutenant General of Armenian Armed Forces and diplomatic rank of Envoy Extraordinary and Minister Plenipotentiary. He has a diploma in counterterrorism from National Defense University of the United States.

During his military career, he was commissioned to the war from the position of the Deputy head of the Armenian Communist Party Central Committee Science division, was tasked the coordination of the establishment of the first Afghan National Academy of Sciences (the academic supervisor of the program was the President of the Soviet Tajikistan National Academy of Sciences Academician M. Asimov).

He was the founding Head of the Division of Military Policy, in the Ministry of Defense of Armenia which later was transformed into the Department of international relations and military cooperation (1996), He was also the founder and Editor-in-Chief of the Haikakan Banak ("Armenian Army") defense-academic journal in 1994. He served in the military diplomacy system of Armenian Armed Forces from 1995 to 1998, setting up the first Defense Office in the US We He worked in the first postgraduate school in the Armed Forces in the late 2000s,

== Other aspects of his career ==
=== Role in "Perestroika" ===
In 1971–1978, Kotanjian was the First Secretary of Leninakan City Committee of Leninist Young Communist League of Armenia. In 1981 – 1985 he was Deputy Head of the Department of Science and Educational Institutions, Central Committee of Communist Party, Armenia and coordinated the National Academy of Sciences and Universities. After graduation from the special post graduate school of the Academy of Social Sciences, USSR Communist Party, he was included into the political reserve of the USSR Communist Party Central Committee leadership. Through the support of Soviet Armenia Government and the Soviet Union State Committee for Vocational Technical Education, he elaborated the special program of systemic modernization of Armenian Vocational Technical Education with involvement of modern technical – technological resources of the USSR ministries of defense industry system represented in the Soviet Armenia economy.

In 1986 Kotanjian was appointed as a Head of Hrazdan regional committee of Communist Party. The Hrazdan region was one of the power houses of USSR Defense Industry. In July and December 1987, as a member of Armenian Communist Party Central Committee, during Central Committee plenary sessions he publicly accused the leaders of Armenian Communist party of cronyism and corruption, and of sabotaging the policy of reforms aimed at modernization of society, also known as “Perestroika”. Kotanjian's views on reforms were supported by USSR liberal-democratic circles and reformist faction of the USSR Communist party.

… at the July 1987 plenum of the Central Committee of the Armenian party, the party organization was criticized for corruption and favoritism. The first secretary of the party district committee, Hayk Kotanjian, spoke of the growth of "a shadow economy," of falsification of reports, of bribery …

=== Actions during the Spitak Earthquake and the Sumgait Massacres ===
In 1988 based on his orders Hrazdan region law enforcement bodies launched clandestine activities to register the testimonies of Armenian refugees from Azerbaijani city Sumgait. These testimonies are proofs of Genocidal actions implemented against Armenian population of Sumgait. Today those “White notes” are located in the archives of Armenia's General Prosecutor office and are the only professionally systemized evidences on Sumgait massacres. In 1989 on Kotanjian's initiative, as a result of negotiations with Azerbaijani relevant authorities, an unprecedented swap of 3000 Azerbaijanis living in Hrazdan region with Armenians from Baku was implemented. The financial and property interests of all people involved in the program were guaranteed.

In 1989–1990, he was an inspector for the First Secretary of the Communist Party of Armenia, he elaborated official policy papers on Karabakh conflict for the leadership of the Central Committee of the Armenian Communist Party.

Kotanjian, as a member of the national headquarters dealing with evacuation of population from earthquake zone, coordinated the program of redeployment of 30.000 people from earthquake zone, mainly women and children, to the different resorts of Soviet Union with full provision of food, medicine and education process.

=== Government in exile of the Nagorno Karabakh ===
In April – December 1991, Kotanjian was Minister of foreign affairs of the Nagorno Karabakh Government in Exile in Moscow with Marius Yuzbashyan (Minister of National Security) and Yuri Barseghov (Minister of Justice). The government was working during the period of the Soviet sanctions against Armenia as a result of latter rejection to participate in the March 1991 referendum on the Soviet Union based the new Federative Union treaty organized by Mikhail Gorbachev.

The government in exile supported the authorities of Armenia and Nagorno Karabakh to make sober assessments of threats eliminating from the collapse of the USSR. The utmost significance for both Armenia and Karabakh was the assessment on perspectives of the coup d’état, organized in Moscow in August 1991. The consultations delivered by the government in exile were instrumental in the process of elaboration of key decisions on the proclamation of Nagorno Karabakh Republic on September 2, 1991, organizing the September 21, 1991 independence Referendum in Armenia and December 10, 1991, Independence Referendum in Nagorno Karabakh. The formation of government in exile by USSR MP Zory Balayan and the acting Armenian Interior Minister Ashot Manucharyan was an extraordinary step, implemented in the extreme unfavorable conditions for the establishment of Armenia and Artsakh sovereignty.

== Honors ==
He has state awards of the Soviet Union, Armenia, and Afghanistan. He was also awarded with a personal weapon. In recognition of Kotanjian's contribution to Armenian-American and Armenia-NATO defense cooperation, he received the Legion of Merit award from the United States Government. In 2008, he was nominated as Distinguished Graduate of the George C. Marshall European Center for Security Studies. He is a founding member of the Marshall Center Alumni Association in Armenia. He is a member of the Board of Academic Experts of the Collective Security Treaty Organization. In 2010, he was a visiting scholar at the National Security Program of the John F. Kennedy School of Government at Harvard University.
