= William Hague (disambiguation) =

William Hague, Baron Hague of Richmond (born 1961) is a British politician.

William Hague may also refer to:

- William Hague (architect) (1840–1899), Irish architect
- William Hague (Australian politician) (1854–1924), South Australian parliamentarian
- William Hague (boxer) (1885–1951), English boxer
- Bill Hague (1852–1898), baseball player
- Billy Hague (1885–1969), ice hockey player
- General William Hague, a character in the television series Babylon 5
