= Neil Hague =

Neil Hague may refer to:

- Neil Hague (footballer) (born 1949), former footballer
- Neil Hague (rugby league) (born 1953), former rugby league footballer
