= Mohammad Al-Haik =

Saudi Arabian footballer (born 1986)

Personal information
- Full name: Mohammad Shafiq Al-Haik
- Date of birth: 16 July 1986 (age 40)
- Place of birth: Qatif, Saudi Arabia
- Positions: Midfielder; defender

Senior career*
Years	Team	Apps	(Gls)
2006–2016	Khaleej FC		
2015–2016	→ Ettifaq FC (loan)	4	(0)
2016–2022	Al-Taraji		
- * Club domestic league appearances and goals

Mohammad Shafiq Al-Haik (Arabic: محمد شفيق الحايك; born 16 July 1986) is a Saudi football player, a midfielder and defender, in Saudi Arabia .
