= Keith Hague =

English footballer

Personal information
- Full name: Keith Hague
- Date of birth: May 25, 1946 (age 80)
- Place of birth: Hull, England
- Date of death: May 19, 2025
- Position: Defender

Senior career*
Years	Team	Apps	(Gls)
–1965	Goole Town		
1965–1966	York City	1	(0)
1966–????	Goole Town		
Total		1	(0)
- * Club domestic league appearances and goals

Keith Hague (born 25 May 1946) is an English former professional footballer who played as a defender in the Football League for York City and in non-League football for Goole Town.
