= Philip A. Haigh =

British historian and writer

- Born: Philip Andrew Haigh; 5 October 1964 (age 61); Huddersfield, West Yorkshire, England
- Occupation: TV presenter
- Spouses: Sarah Louise Claxton (1990–2022), Debra-Jane Higginson (2024-Present)
- Writing career
- Years active: 1995–present

Philip Andrew Haigh (born 5 October 1964) is a British I.T. Professional, TV presenter and writer of non-fiction military history books, mostly on the subject of the Wars of the Roses and local history associated with Robin Hood's Bay. In recent years he has taken to writing military fiction works based on characters and events from World War II.

== Early life and education ==
Haigh was born in Birkby, Huddersfield in West Yorkshire in October 1964. The youngest of three children born to William and Sylvia Haigh (both now deceased), he was later educated at John Smeaton Community College in East Leeds where he was chosen to both represent the school and West Yorkshire in a number of track and field events, including the 200 and 1500 meter's – as well as 'Cross Country'.

== Later life ==
In 1980, Haigh commenced a career in retail, working for major UK based supermarket chains such as Morrisons and Asda Stores. He entered Asda's retail management training program in June 1984 and undertook a number of junior then senior roles within store operations, before finally taking up a central role at Asda's head office in Leeds in 1994.

It was during this time that he commenced his academic writing. In 1998, Haigh left Asda to pursue an I.T. career working in service management and program management for 'blue chip' I.T. organisations such as IBM, Capgemini, Sun Microsystems and Computacenter, before working as an independent I.T. consultant specialising in strategic outsourcing and managing large scale transformational business change programs.

In 1999, Haigh founded the Yorkshire Battlefields Society, but after building close links with the Battlefields Trust, the society merged with the trust in 2002. At this time, Haigh became a trustee of the Battlefields Trust and editor of the trusts' journal 'Battlefield' – which was formally the Yorkshire Battlefields Society's quarterly magazine.

Haigh has two children from his first marriage (a son Lewis, and a daughter Charlotte). A keen yachtsman, scuba diver and mountain climber (having climbed in the Alps with Kenton Cool), he currently resides in Robin Hood's Bay in North Yorkshire, where he also serves as a Magistrate.

== Publications ==
Haigh retains a wide following of loyal readers. Most of his works are to do with the subject of the Wars of the Roses, although in recent years he has turned to writing works of fiction and material associated with the history of Robin Hood's Bay where he currently resides. The titles are as follows:-

=== Non-fiction Military ===
- The Military Campaigns of the Wars of the Roses (Alan Sutton Publishing, 1995)
- The Battle of Wakefield 1460 (Alan Sutton Publishing, 1996)
- Where Both the Hosts Fought – The Battles of Edgecote and Lose-Cote-Field (Battlefield Press, 1997)
- Campaigns of the Wars of the Roses (Bramley Books, 1998)
- From Wakefield to Towton 1460 – 1461 (Pen and Sword Books, 2002)

=== Non-fiction Local History ===
- Walking & Exploring Robin Hood's Bay - The Upper Bay Area (Fylingdales Museum & Archive Trust, 2024)
- Walking & Exploring Robin Hood's Bay - The Lower Bay Area (Fylingdales Museum & Archive Trust, 2024)
- Robin Hood's Bay & Fylingdales During WW2 (Battlefield Press, 2025)
- The Friendly Societies of Robin Hood's Bay (Battlefield Press, 2026)

=== Fiction ===
- Drake R.N. (Due 2025)
- Drake and an Act of Treason (Due 2026)
- Drake's Escape (No known date)

== TV appearances ==
As well as featuring in a number of BBC and ITV 'news programmes', Haigh has also appeared in a number of other history related TV documentaries:-

- The Battle of Wakefield 1460. (An ITV Production in 1999)
- The Battle of Stamford Bridge 1066. (An ITV Production in 2000)
- Towton 1461. (A RKP Production for BBC 2010)
- The History of the River Aire. (A RKP Production for BBC 2012) – features the Battle of Ferrybridge 1461
