= George Haig, 2nd Earl Haig =

British artist

The Right Honourable The Earl Haig OBE KStJ DL FRSA
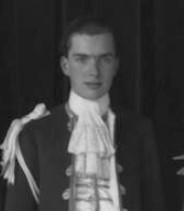

Member of the House of Lords
- Lord Temporal
- In office 15 March 1939 – 11 November 1999 as a hereditary peer
- Preceded by: Douglas Haig, 1st Earl Haig
- Succeeded by: Seat abolished (Note: Pursuant to the House of Lords Act 1999.)

Personal details
- Born: George Alexander Eugene Douglas Haig; 15 March 1918
- Died: 9 July 2009 (aged 91) Melrose, Scottish Borders, Scotland
- Resting place: Dryburgh Abbey; 55°34′37.5″N 2°38′58″W
- Party: Conservative
- Spouses: Adrienne Thérèse Morley (m. 1956; div. 1981) Donna Gerolama Lopez y Royo di Taurisano (m. 1981)
- Children: 3
- Parent: Douglas Haig, 1st Earl Haig (father)
- Education: Christ Church, Oxford

Military service
- Allegiance: United Kingdom
- Branch/service: British Army
- Years of service: 1939–1945
- Unit: Royal Scots Greys
- Battles/wars: Second World War (POW)

George Alexander Eugene Douglas Haig, 2nd Earl Haig, OBE, KStJ, DL, FRSA (15 March 1918 – 9 July 2009) was a Scottish artist and peer who succeeded to the earldom of Haig on 29 January 1928, at the age of nine upon the death of his father, Field Marshal the 1st Earl Haig. Until then he was styled Viscount Dawick. Throughout his life, he was usually known to his family and friends as Dawyck Haig.

== Early life ==
Haig spent his early years at Bemersyde in the Borders of Scotland. In 1937 he was a Page of Honour to George VI at his coronation. He was educated at Stowe School and at Christ Church, Oxford, receiving a BA in 1939 and a MA in 1950.

During World War II Haig served as a commissioned officer with the British Army's Royal Scots Greys Regiment in Palestine, and in North Africa during the Western Desert Campaign, where he was captured during an attack on the Afrika Corps' lines in 1941. He was subsequently held as a prisoner of war in Italy and Germany, including a spell at Oflag IV-C P.O.W. Camp (known to the British inmates as "Colditz"), where he was held as a member of the "Prominente" – a prisoner with family connections to powerful political/military figures in the Allied nations that were kept under special confinement conditions via the orders of Heinrich Himmler, for purposes undisclosed. It was at Colditz that Haig developed his talents as a painter and draughtsman.

== Later life ==
Haig was involved with charities that provided for ex-servicemen founded by his father. He was chairman of the British Legion in Scotland from 1962 to 1965 and president of the Earl Haig Fund from 1980 to 1986. In 1966 he was appointed an Officer of the Order of the British Empire for his services to the British Legion.

In 1977 he was dubbed a Knight of the Order of St John. In 2000 he published an autobiography entitled My Father's Son. Haig was also a distinguished artist and an Associate of the Royal Scottish Academy.

In September 2006, Earl Haig criticised the Ministry of Defence's decision to posthumously pardon all 306 British soldiers executed during World War I for cowardice, desertion or other offences. In reference to the soldiers pardoned, he stated that "It was a terribly sad situation and some of these soldiers were genuinely shell-shocked. But many were rogues, persistent deserters and criminals, or they were guilty of cowardice. They had to be made an example of." This remark drew criticism from Andrew MacKinlay MP, who had campaigned for the pardon and was reported as "astonished" by Earl Haig's remarks, claiming that they had not received due process.

== Death ==
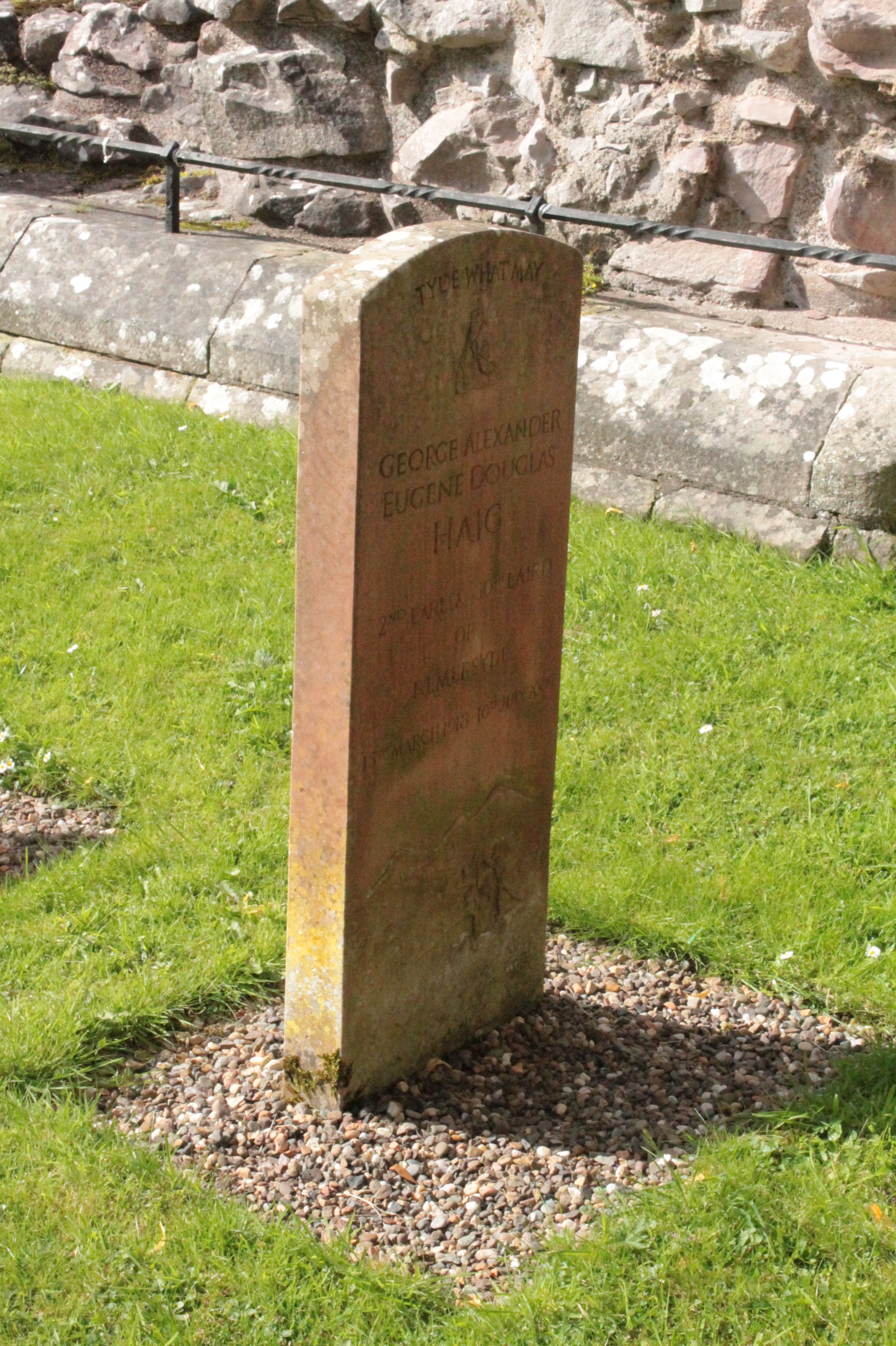
The grave of George Haig, 2nd Earl Haig, Dryburgh Abbey

He died on 9 July 2009 at Borders General Hospital, aged 91. His body was buried in the Haig family plot at Dryburgh Abbey in the Borders. The simple grave lies in front of his father's grave.

== Family ==
Earl Haig married, on 19 July 1956, Adrienne Thérèse Morley (4 May 1929 – 3 January 2010), daughter of Derrick Morley, formerly of Islanmore and Rockstown Castle, co. Limerick (great-great-nephew of the 1st Baron Fermoy), by Lesley, eldest daughter of Sir Nigel Leslie Campbell, of Woodrow High House, Amersham, Buckinghamshire (grandson of Lord Charles Pelham-Clinton), and had three children:

- Lady Adrienne Raina Haig,
- Lady Elizabeth Vivienne Thérèse Haig,
- Alexander Douglas Derrick Haig, 3rd Earl Haig.

The Earl and Countess Haig were divorced in 1981 and, on 24 March 1981, he married Donna Gerolama Lopez y Royo di Taurisano (of the Apulian Dukes di Taurisano e Monteroni). She died on 15 April 2023, at the age of 85.

== Publications ==
- My Father's Son (2000), memoir.

== Notes ==
Peerage of the United Kingdom
Preceded by Douglas Haig	Earl Haig; 1928–2009	Succeeded by Alexander Haig
