= Readeption of Henry VI =

1470 restoration of Henry VI to the throne of England

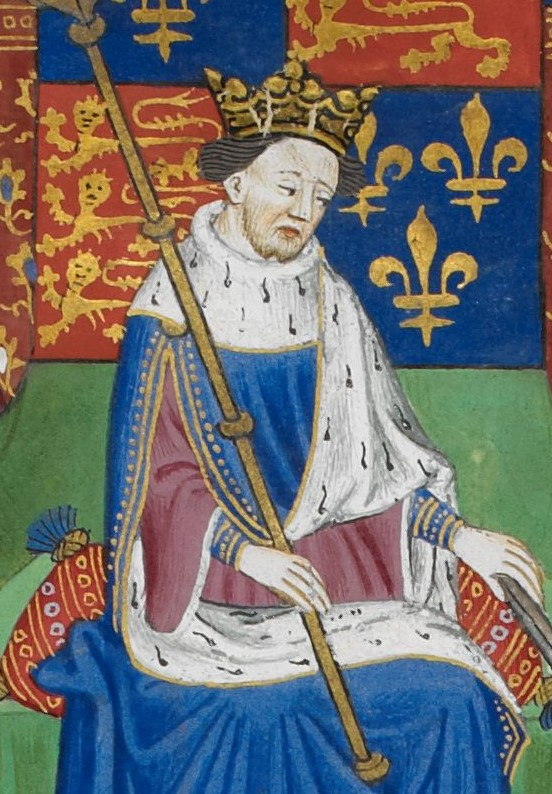
Henry VI of England

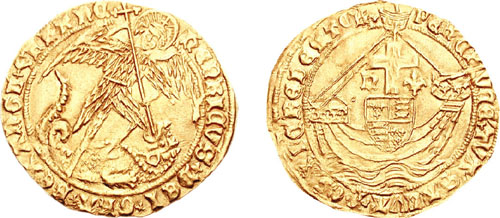
Gold "Angel" coin of Henry's later reign, struck in either London or York, showing the Archangel Michael slaying the Dragon (left) and Henry's shield being carried aboard a ship (right).

The Readeption was the restoration of Henry VI of England to the throne of England in 1470. Edward, Duke of York, had taken the throne as Edward IV in 1461. Henry had fled with some Lancastrian supporters and spent much of the next few years in hiding in Northern England or in Scotland, where there was still some Lancastrian support. Henry was captured in 1465 and was held as a prisoner in the Tower of London. Following dissent with his former key supporter, Richard Neville, 16th Earl of Warwick, Edward was forced to flee in 1470. Henry was then restored to the throne, although he was deposed again the following year.

== Nomenclature ==
The period known as the Readeption was so named because of the formula at the start of Henry VI's issuants, viz. "the forty-ninth year of the reign of King Henry VI and the first year of the readeption of his Royal power".

== Background ==
King Henry VI had been king of England nearly all his life: his father Henry V had died in 1422 on campaign in France when Henry VI was only a few months old. Henry VI was never a strong king like his father; he was unable to keep a firm hand on either government or the nobility, and by the mid-1450s civil war had broken out. The main protagonists were supporters of Henry and his Queen—Lancastrians—and those of the recalcitrant Richard, Duke of York, or Yorkists. These civil wars—known today as Wars of the Roses—broke out in 1455 when Henry's army was defeated by a Yorkist one at the First Battle of St Albans, and there were further bloody encounters between the two sides until, eventually, in March 1461, the Yorkist army led by Edward, Duke of York, beat the royal army at Towton. This decisive engagement has been described as the biggest battle ever fought on English soil: it resulted in Edward taking the throne for himself as King Edward IV, and King Henry and Queen Margaret escaping into Scottish exile.

Edward reigned for the next ten years, supported by his close allies the Neville family—pre-eminent amongst them, Richard, Earl of Warwick. It was not particularly peaceful; until 1464, there were continuous sieges, clashes and encounters in the North of England, until these were eventually crushed by Warwick's brother John. John was rewarded with the earldom of Northumberland, a title that had traditionally been held by the Nevilles' bitter territorial rivals in the north, the Percy family.

=== Warwick's discontent with Yorkist rule ===
Warwick, however, was increasingly discontented with his former protégé, King Edward. Not only did he disagree with the pro-Burgundian and anti-French foreign policy Edward was pursuing, but the king had made an unpopular marriage to Elizabeth Woodville, whom Warwick appears to have considered of parvenu stock. Edward's younger brother George of Clarence was also, for his own reasons, turning against Edward, and by the late 1460s, he and Warwick were in political alliance against the King. In late 1467, Warwick withdrew from the court to the north and his Yorkshire estates. George was equally dissatisfied with his lot under his brother's regime, particularly as Edward had recently forbidden a marriage between George and Warwick's eldest daughter, Isabel Neville. The king had also recently dismissed Warwick and John's brother George from the chancellorship—in (says historian Charles Ross) a "pointed" manner.

According to Jean de Wavrin, the earliest indication that Warwick had turned to treason was in July 1467: Wavrin relates that Warwick was even at that time promising to make the young Duke of Clarence king in place of his brother. Certainly, though, by 1468 relations between Warwick and the King had deteriorated to such an extent that the earl was actively plotting against Edward. A captured Lancastrian messenger at the siege of Harlech Castle alleged that Warwick was not only conspiring against the King, but was even by now negotiating with Margaret of Anjou. As a result, Edward summoned the Earl to appear before the Royal council; Warwick refused to do so. A second royal demand for Warwick to attend upon Edward early in 1468 also met with a similar response.

England at that time was less peaceful than the King would have wished, and there appears to have been a popular undercurrent of discontent; for example, a mob attacked and pillaged Earl Rivers' estates in Kent, with complaints about heavy levels of taxation being common. In the north, a group of malcontents gathered in arms and offered to fight with the Earl of Warwick. Whilst relations between the king and the Earl of Warwick appear to have improved slightly in 1468—for instance, both Warwick and John Neville regularly attended the Royal council, and the former also took part in the ceremonial departure of the king's sister, Margaret, who was to marry the duke of Burgundy that summer. Ross suggests that this was at least in part due to a failure of "political judgement" on the king's part.

=== Warwick's first uprising ===
Popular politics was not irrelevant in the 15th century: historian K. B. McFarlane noted that "with little to lose and grievances that were real enough" the common people were "easily incited to rebellion by magnates they admired", and Ross has suggested that the Earl of Warwick was both willing to exploit and capable of exploiting these feelings. In late April 1469 a large body of dissidents gathered under the leadership of one Robin of Redesdale in Yorkshire; however, Warwick's brother, John Neville, appears to have dispersed them with little trouble. Almost immediately, however, there was another, separate but larger gathering in the East Riding of Yorkshire, this time led by one Robin of Holderness. This rebellion may have been in support of the Percy family's traditional claim to the earldom of Northumberland; this group, too, was scattered by John Neville, and its leader beheaded in York. In the meantime, the remnants of Robin of Redesdale's original force had regrouped and re-emerged in Lancashire; this rising, at least, is generally considered by historians to have almost certainly been a Warwick construct. In any case, it gathered a large army around it, and included many retainers and men otherwise connected to the Neville family in Yorkshire, including Sir John Conyers, the son of Lord FitzHugh, and the Nevilles' own cousin, Sir Henry Neville; indeed it contained three Neville brothers-in-law.

King Edward was, however, slow in responding to these multiple threats ("and slower still to link them with Neville treason", says Ross). Warwick himself appears to have been pre-occupied with a naval command. In mid-June the King deemed it necessary to travel to the north in order to suppress Redesdale's rebellion; yet his actions have been described as "lacking urgency". Worse, by the time Edward reached Newark, his intelligence reported to him that the rebel force may have been five times the size of the king's own. He had also by now heard rumours of Warwick's involvement in the uprising, as he wrote to Warwick, Clarence and the Archbishop asking them for help and saying that they were not doing the things "as the rumour here runneth". But instead they set sail for Calais, where on 11 July George Neville, Archbishop of York, married George Plantagenet, 1st Duke of Clarence, to Isabelle Neville, in defiance of the King's expressed wishes. Soon afterwards, they wrote to the rebels in the north of England.

The rebel army grew larger and reached as far south as Oxfordshire. This alarmed the King, and the rebels defeated the Royal army at the Battle of Edgcote, six miles north-east of Banbury, on 24 July. Unaware of this disaster, Edward was captured by Warwick on 29 July and imprisoned in Warwick Castle. Earl Rivers and his son John Woodville were beheaded shortly afterwards. Warwick summoned a Parliament, which he probably hoped would depose Edward in Clarence's favour. But widespread rioting forced him to release the King by mid-September. Surprisingly, Edward forgave both Warwick and Clarence.

=== Warwick's allegiance to Lancaster ===
After another failed rebellion, thwarted by Edward at the Battle of Losecoat Field in March 1470, Warwick and Clarence fled to France. There in July they met with Margaret of Anjou, the wife of Henry VI and de facto leader of the Lancastrians. Warwick had played a huge role in deposing Henry from the throne in 1461. However, after tense negotiations Warwick, Clarence, and Margaret came to a deal: Warwick and Clarence would help restore Henry VI to the throne, with French aid; Henry VI's son, Edward of Westminster, would be his heir as Prince of Wales; but if Westminster died then Clarence would become heir to the throne. This alliance was sealed by the marriage of Warwick's youngest daughter Anne Neville to Prince Edward.

Edward IV sought to shore up his position. He had released Henry Percy from the Tower on 27 October 1469. On 27 March 1470, Edward IV restored Percy to the earldom of Northumberland, which had been granted to John Neville. Neville was compensated by elevation to Marquess of Montagu, as he had not taken part in his brother's uprisings. Between the restoration of Henry Percy and the return of Warwick, the King was "walking a tightrope" as to whether Montague would accept the Marquisate as compensation.

On 13 September, Warwick and Clarence docked in Dartmouth, Devon, and the Earl of Pembroke in Plymouth. Warwick entered London in triumph and freed Henry VI from the Tower on 6 October.

== Readeption ==
The Readeption of Henry VI took place on 3 October 1470. However, by this point Henry was mentally too feeble to rule unaided; for example, he had to be led by the hand when he paraded through London. Following his return to the throne, all official documents began to refer to his regnal year as "the 49th year of the reign of Henry VI and the first of his readeption to royal power".

Although the Lancastrian regime was reinstated, it has been described as "Lancastrian... in a Neville costume".

== Edward IV's return ==
Henry's return to the throne did not last long. After gaining Burgundian support, Edward IV landed at Ravenspurn on 14 March 1471. Local militias were raised in the north; one, led by Sir John Westerdale, may even have numbered a substantial "several thousand men", and others "to the number of 6,000–7,000 milled menacingly".

The royal propagandist of the Historie of the arrivall of Edward IV suggests the royal army was, "though small, well-armed and determined" and that Edward claimed he had returned solely for his duchy of York. However, the King could not start raising a force of any numbers until well to the south (of England), in Lord Hastings's estates in the Midlands (about 3,000 men in Nottingham, where he was joined by William Parr and James Harrington, with their personal forces of sixty men-at-arms). Whereas, in the north, came "not so many as supposed would have come", reported the Arrivalist.

Edward defeated Warwick in the Battle of Barnet on 14 April, in which both Warwick and his brother John Neville were killed, and the Lancastrians in the Battle of Tewkesbury. Edward of Westminster was killed there, the Beaufort family almost extinguished entirely, and Queen Margaret captured. Edward IV entered London on 21 May. Henry VI died that night, or soon afterwards, perhaps on Edward's orders.

== See also ==
- Regency government, 1422–1437
