= John Conyers (died 1490) =

Yorkshire gentry during the Wars of the Roses

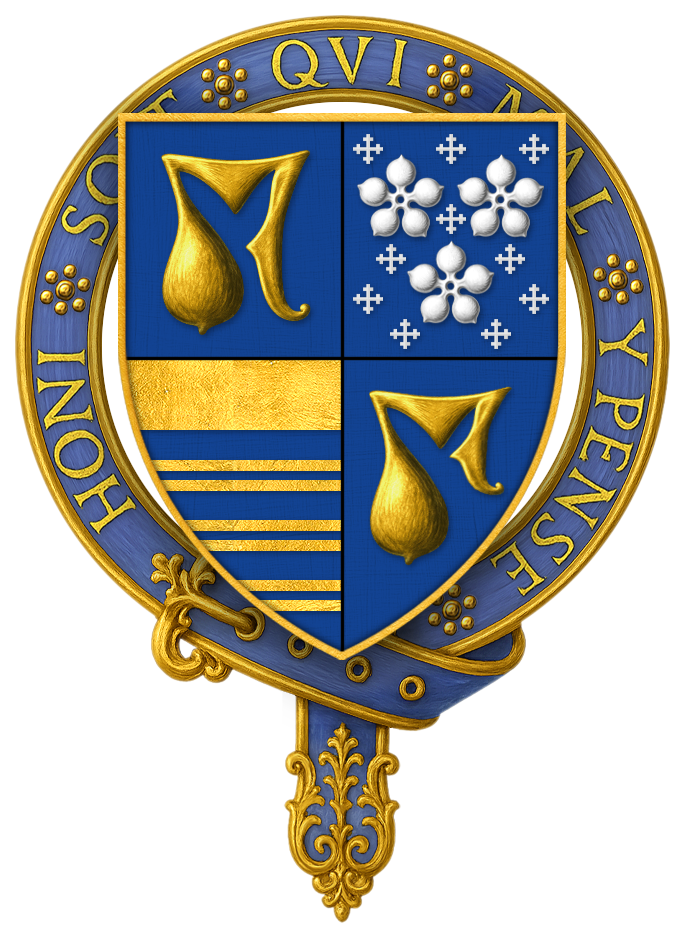
Coat of Arms of Sir John Conyers

Sir John Conyers KG (died 1490), one of twenty-five children of Christopher Conyers (died 1460), was a pre-eminent member of the gentry of Yorkshire, northern England, during the fifteenth century Wars of the Roses.

== Life and career ==
Based in Hornby Castle, he was originally retained by his patron, the regional magnate Richard Neville, Earl of Salisbury at a fee of £8 6s. 8d. By 1465, he was steward of the Honour of Richmond and was being retained, along with his brothers William and Richard, by Salisbury's son and successor as regional magnate, the earl of Warwick, for which he received £13 6s. 8d. He accompanied Salisbury on his journey from Middleham to Ludlow in September 1459, and took part in the Battle of Blore Heath on the 23rd of that month. He later took part in Warwick's rebellion against Edward IV in 1469 and the Battle of Edgcote, raising his 'Wensleydale connection, and possibly even being the ringleader, 'Robin of Redesdale.' He submitted to the King in March 1470. After Edward's successful return to power in 1471 he was a justice of the peace for Yorkshire's North Riding. A loyal retainer and probable ducal councillor of Edward's brother, Richard, Duke of Gloucester, later King Richard III, (who retained him for £20 annually) he was made a Knight of the Body, at 200 marks per annum annuity, and substantial estates in Yorkshire, "where he was very active on local commissions." He was also elected to the Order of the Garter. In August 1485 he appears to have fought in and survived the Battle of Bosworth Field in the army of Richard III, and was later granted offices in Richmondshire by the new king, Henry VII in February 1486, as a result of 'good and faithful service.' He supported Henry during the first rebellion of his reign, in spring 1486, a position that has been called 'particularly significant' and, according to Michael Hicks, it 'was a momentous decision'.
