= Battalion =

Military unit size designation

Standard NATO symbol for a friendly infantry battalion

A battalion is a military unit, typically consisting of up to 1,000 soldiers, commanded by a lieutenant colonel and subdivided into several companies, each typically commanded by a major or a captain. The typical battalion is built from three operational companies, one weapons company and one headquarters company. In some countries battalions consist exclusively of infantry, while in others battalions are unit-level organizations. The word battalion has its origins in the Late Latin word battalion, which derives from Late Latin battālia, meaning "battle" or "combat" The English-language term originally characterised a large group of soldiers ready for battle. Over time, its meaning evolved in military terminology.

The word "battalion" came into the English language in the 16th century from the French bataillon, meaning "battle squadron" (similar to the Italian battaglione meaning the same thing) and the Spanish batallón, derived from the Vulgar Latin noun battalia ("battle") and ultimately from the Classical Latin verb battuere ("to beat" or "to strike"). The first use of the word in English is attested in the 1580s.

== Description ==
A battalion is composed of two or more primary mission companies, which are often of a common type (e.g., infantry, tank, or maintenance), although there are exceptions, such as combined arms battalions in the U.S. Army. In addition to the primary mission companies, a battalion typically includes a headquarters staff and combat service support, which may be combined into a headquarters and service company. A battalion may contain a combat support company. With all these components, a battalion is the smallest military unit capable of "limited independent operations".

The battalion must have a source of resupply to enable it to sustain operations for more than a few days. This is because a battalion's complement of ammunition, expendable weapons (e.g., hand grenades and disposable rocket launchers), water, rations, fuel, lubricants, replacement parts, batteries, and medical supplies normally consists of only what the battalion's soldiers and the battalion's vehicles can carry.

The commander's staff coordinates and plans operations. A battalion's subordinate companies and their platoons are dependent upon the battalion headquarters for command, control, communications and intelligence, and the battalion's service and support structure. The battalion is usually part of a regiment, group, or brigade, depending on the branch of service.

== NATO ==
NATO map symbols
a friendly battalion
of unspecified composition
a friendly mechanised
infantry battalion
a friendly tank battalion
a hostile motor
infantry battalion
a friendly field ambulance

NATO defines a battalion as being "larger than a company, but smaller than a regiment" while "consisting of two or more company-, battery-, or troop-sized units along with a headquarters." The standard NATO symbol for a battalion represented by a pair of vertical lines above a framed unit icon. Member nations have specified the various names they will use for organisations of this size.

Names for battalions in NATO member armed forces
Belgium	Bataillon or escadrille
Bulgaria	Bataliyon (батальон) or diviziyon (дивизион)
Canada	Battalion or regiment
Croatia	Bojna or rarely bataljun
Czechia	Prapor, oddíl or letka
Denmark	Bataljon, afdeling or bataljons kampgruppe
Finland	Pataljoona or bataljon
France	Bataillon or groupement
Germany	Bataillon, Abteilung, Bootsgeschwader, Schiff, or Lehrgruppe
Greece	Taghma, moira, epilarchia
Hungary	Zászlóalj or osztály
Italy	Battaglione, gruppo, gruppo squadroni, autogruppo, or reparto
Lithuania	Batalionas or eskadrilė
Latvia	Bataljons or eskadriļe, divizions, lazerete
Netherlands	Bataljon, afdeling, groep, colonne, or commando
Norway	Bataljon, stridsgruppe
North Macedonia	батаљон, bataljon
Poland	Batalion or dywizjon
Portugal	Batalhão or grupo
Romania	Batalion
Spain	Batallón, grupo, or grupo táctico
Turkey	Tabur
United Kingdom	Battalion, regiment, field ambulance, wing, battle group, or commando
United States	Battalion or squadron

== General history ==
In the 16th and 17th centuries, a battalion represented a mass of 3,000–4,000 men, was divided into 15–20 companies, and (since the superstition of the time required odd numbers) was built so as to have 59 ranks in depth and 51 men at the front; while a pikemen, or spearmen, placed in the middle, were surrounded by three ranks of musketeers, other musketeers were located in separate, small quadrangles at the corners of a battalion and were often used as skirmishers (see also Pike and shot). Russia had a gulyay-gorod for a while, an analogue of Pike and shot. The increased effectiveness of artillery fire led to the use of a shallower formation and to the division of these large masses into several battalions. Large cavalry regiments (of 10 squadrons) also began to be divided into 2 battalions.

== British Army ==
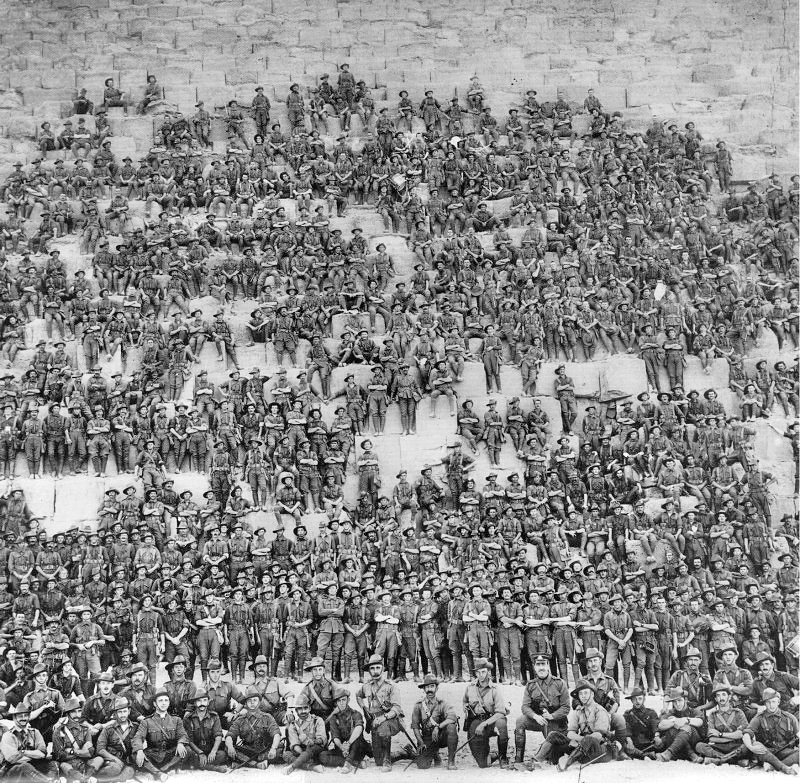
Australian 11th (Western Australia) Battalion, 3rd Infantry Brigade, Australian Imperial Force, posing on the Great Pyramid of Giza on 10 January 1915

The term battalion is used in the British Army Infantry and some corps including the Royal Electrical and Mechanical Engineers and Intelligence Corps. It was formerly used in the Royal Engineers (before they switched to regiments), and was also used in the now defunct Royal Army Ordnance Corps and Royal Pioneer Corps. Other corps usually use the term "regiment" instead.

An infantry battalion is numbered ordinarily within its regiment (e.g., 1st Battalion, The Rifles, usually referred to as 1 Rifles). It normally has a headquarters company, support company, and three rifle companies (usually, but not always, A, B and C companies). Each company is commanded by a major, the officer commanding (OC), with a captain or senior lieutenant as second-in-command (2IC). The HQ company contains signals, quartermaster, catering, intelligence, administration, pay, training, operations and medical elements. The support company usually contains anti-tank, machine gun, mortar, pioneer and reconnaissance platoons. Mechanised units usually have an attached light aid detachment (LAD) of the Royal Electrical and Mechanical Engineers (REME) to perform field repairs on vehicles and equipment. A British battalion in theatre during World War II had around 845 men; as of 2012, a British battalion had around 650 soldiers. With successive rounds of cutbacks after the war, many infantry regiments were reduced to a single battalion (others were amalgamated to form large regiments that maintained multiple battalions, e.g., the Royal Anglian Regiment).

Important figures in a battalion headquarters include:

- Commanding officer (CO) (invariably a lieutenant colonel)
- Second-in-command (2i/c) (major)
- Adjutant (captain)
- Quartermaster (QM) (LE major)
- Quartermaster (technical) (QM(T)) (LE captain)
- Medical officer (MO) (Royal Army Medical Service captain or major)
- Administrative officer (Adjutant General's Corps captain or major)
- Padre (Royal Army Chaplains Department chaplain 4th or 3rd class)
- Operations officer (OpsO) (senior captain)
- Intelligence officer (IO) (lieutenant or captain)
- Regimental Signals officer (RSO) (Royal Corps of Signals captain or senior captain of relevant corps)
- Regimental sergeant major (RSM) (warrant officer class 1)
- Regimental quartermaster sergeant (RQMS) (warrant officer class 2)
- Regimental quartermaster sergeant (technical) (RQMS(T)) (warrant officer class 2)

Battalions of other corps are given separate cardinal numbers within their corps (e.g., 101 Battalion REME).

=== Battle group ===
A battle group consists of an infantry battalion or armoured regiment with sub-units detached from other military units acting under the command of the battalion commander.

== Canadian Army ==
In the Canadian Army, the battalion is the standard unit organisation for infantry and combat service support and each battalion is divided into one or more sub-units referred to as companies. In the Canadian Forces, most battalions are reserve units of between 100 and 200 soldiers that include an operationally ready, field-deployable component of approximately a half-company apiece. The nine regular force infantry battalions each contain three or four rifle companies and one or two support companies. Canadian battalions are generally commanded by lieutenant-colonels, though smaller reserve battalions may be commanded by majors.

Those regiments consisting of more than one battalion are:

- The Royal Canadian Regiment (three regular and one reserve battalions)
- Princess Patricia's Canadian Light Infantry (three regular battalions)
- Royal 22^{e} Régiment (three regular and two reserve battalions)
- The Royal Newfoundland Regiment (two reserve battalions)

Tactically, the Canadian battalion forms the core of the infantry battle group, which also includes various supporting elements such as armour, artillery, combat engineers and combat service support. An infantry battle group will typically be commanded by the commander of the core infantry battalion around which it is formed and can range in size from 300 to 1,500 or more soldiers, depending on the nature of the mission assigned.

== Indian Army ==
A battalion in the Indian Army consists of four rifle companies. In turn, each rifle company consists three platoons. A battalion in the Indian Army is commanded by a colonel. Normally a battalion is attached to a regiment of infantry, which is organised, as a general rule, of a number of battalions and the regimental centre battalion.

== Royal Netherlands Army ==
In the Royal Netherlands Army, a mechanised infantry battalion usually consists of one command- and medical company, three mechanised infantry companies and one support company, which has three platoons with heavy mortars and three platoons with anti-tank missiles (TOW). With the Dutch artillery units, the equivalent of a battalion is called an afdeling (which translates to "section").

Combat companies consist of (usually mechanised) infantry, combat engineers, or tanks. In the latter case, the unit is called an eskadron, which translates roughly to "squadron". There are also support battalions in the Dutch Army, which specialise on a specific task: for example, supplies and transport or communications.

The Netherlands have four battalions that are permanently reserved for the United Nations, for the purpose of peacekeeping duties.

An infantry battalion, logistical battalion, combat battalion and the Netherlands Marine Corps all have a battalion structure. Each battalion usually consists of the following:

- Battalion command
  - Commander
  - Second in command
- General service
  - Personnel section
  - Intelligence section
  - Operations section
  - Materiel section
  - Communication section
- Command company
  - Command group
  - Administration group
  - Medical group
  - Communication group
  - Supply platoon
- Three infantry companies
- Support company
  - Command group
  - Recon platoon
  - Mortar platoon
  - Anti-tank platoon

== Russia ==
In the Russian Empire and almost everywhere then, its average number was 800–1,000 men. These were 4 companies. But there were battalions of 3 or 5 companies (before 1910 such were part of rifle, fortress and reserve units). Usually a battalion was part of a regiment (2–4 battalions); but there were also separate battalions.

== Soviet Armed Forces ==
=== Motorised rifle battalion ===
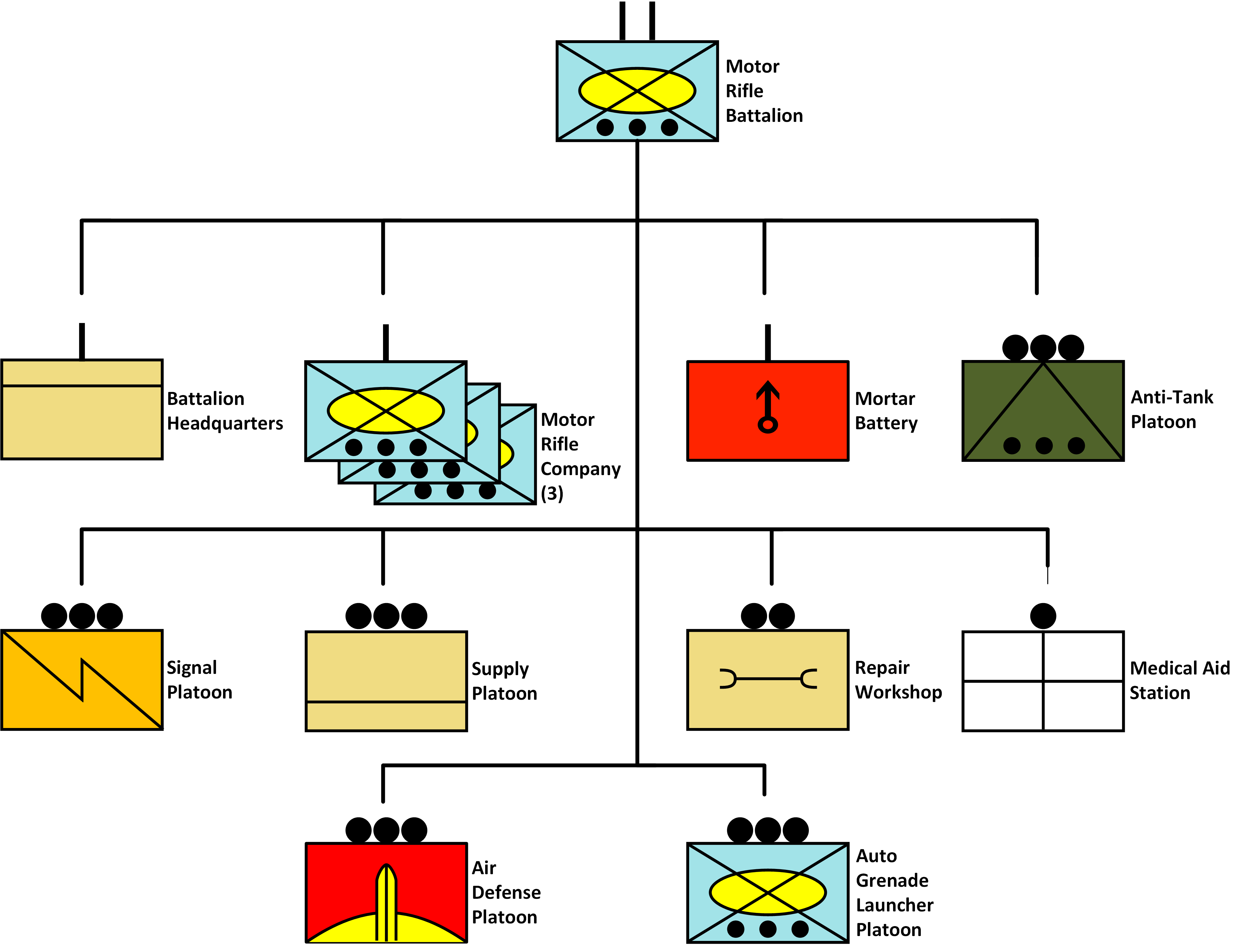
Organisation of Soviet Motor Rifle Battalion late 1980s

In the Soviet Armed Forces, a motorised rifle battalion could be mounted in either BTR armoured personnel carriers or BMP infantry fighting vehicles, with the former being more numerous into the late 1980s. Both consisted of a battalion headquarters of 12 personnel and three motorised rifle companies of 110 personnel each, along with a number of combat support units: a mortar battery consisting of eight 120 mm 120-PM-43 mortars or automatic 82 mm 2B9 Vasileks, an air defence platoon with nine MANPADs, either the SA-7 Grail, SA-14 Gremlin or SA-16 Gimlet and an automatic grenade launcher platoon with six 30 mm AGS-17 launchers. The BTR battalion also featured an anti-tank platoon with four AT-3 Sagger or AT-4 Spigot launchers and two 73 mm SPG-9 recoilless guns; BTR units on high-readiness status sometimes had six missile launchers and three recoilless guns. Both featured the same support units as well, with a signal platoon, supply platoon, repair workshop and medical aid station. The addition of the antitank platoon meant that a BTR battalion at full strength was 525 personnel and 60 BTRs, including three command variants, while a BMP battalion consisted of 497 personnel and 45 BMPs, including three command variants.

=== Tank battalion ===
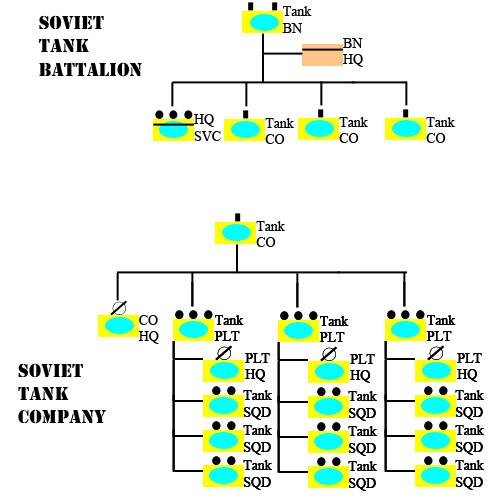
1980s Soviet tank battalion and company

Prior to the late 1980s, Soviet tank battalions consisted of three tank companies of 13 T-64, T-72 or T-80 tanks each, along with a battalion headquarters mounted in a command tank and a headquarters and service platoon, for a total of 165 personnel and 40 tanks; battalions using the older T-54, T-55 or T-62s tanks had 31 or 40 additional enlisted personnel. However, forces in Eastern Europe began to standardise to a smaller formation with 135 personnel and 31 tanks total, with each tank company consisting of 10 tanks total.

=== Artillery battalion ===
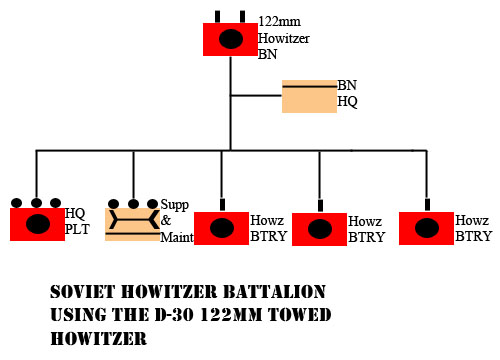
1980s Soviet 122 mm artillery battalion

A Soviet artillery battalion in the late 1980s consisted of a battalion headquarters, a headquarters platoon, a maintenance and supply platoon and three firing batteries, each with six artillery pieces, whether the self-propelled 2S1 Gvozdikas or the towed D-30 howitzers, and numbering 260 personnel or 240 personnel respectively. Rocket launcher artillery battalions consisted of a headquarters and headquarters platoon, a service battery and three firing batteries equipped with BM-21 Grads for a total of 255 personnel.

== Sweden ==
A Swedish battalion during the mid-17th century up to the mid-18th century was the smallest tactical unit in combat. The 600-man unit was formed, temporarily, at the inception of a battle by joining four-foot companies from a foot regiment of eight companies. The commander of the regiment, an överste (colonel), led the first battalion and his deputy, an överstelöjtnant (lieutenant colonel), the second battalion. Battalion commanders and all other officers marched in front of the formation. Non-commissioned officers (underofficers) marched beside and behind to prevent desertion, and to replace officers who were killed. In addition to his principal duties, senior officers, such as majorer, the överstelöjtnant and överste, also commanded a company. So that the överste could focus on the operations of his regiment and first battalion, command of his company was delegated to a kaptenlöjtnant. During battle, each officer, except the fänrikar, was in charge of a portion of his company. Underofficer (NCO) ranks consisted of furir, förare, fältväbel, sergeant and rustmästare.

== Swiss Army ==
With the major reform of its armed forces in 2004, the Swiss Army abandoned the old regimental system and adopted a combat team approach centred on battalions as the building blocks of mission-oriented task forces. Battalion sizes vary between branches.

== United States Armed Forces ==
=== United States Army ===
In the United States Army, a battalion is a unit composed of a headquarters and two to six batteries, companies, or troops. They are normally identified by ordinal numbers (1st Battalion, 2nd Squadron, etc.) and normally have subordinate units that are identified by single letters (Battery A, Company A, Troop A, etc.). Battalions are tactical and administrative organizations with a limited capability to plan and conduct independent operations and are normally organic components of brigades, groups, or regiments.

A U.S. Army battalion includes the battalion commander (lieutenant colonel), executive officer (major), command sergeant major (CSM), headquarters staff and usually three to five companies, with a total of 300 to 1,000 (but typically 500 to 600) soldiers.

During the American Civil War, an infantry or cavalry battalion was an ad hoc grouping of companies from the parent regiment (which had ten companies, A through K, minus J as described below), except for certain regular infantry regiments, which were formally organized into three battalions of six companies each (numbered 1–6 per battalion vice sequential letter designations). After 1882, cavalry battalions were renamed squadrons and cavalry companies were renamed troops. Artillery battalions typically comprised four or more batteries, although this number fluctuated considerably.

During World War II, most infantry regiments consisted of three battalions (1st, 2nd and 3rd) with each battalion consisting of three rifle companies and a heavy weapons company. That is, rifle companies A, B, C along with heavy weapons Company D were part of the 1st battalion, rifle companies E, F, G and heavy weapons Company H constituted the 2nd battalion, and rifle companies I, K, L and heavy weapons Company M were in the 3rd. There was no J Company: the letter J was traditionally not used because in 18th- and 19th-century old-style type, the capital letters I and J looked alike and were therefore easily confused with one another. It was common for a battalion to become temporarily attached to a different regiment. For example, during the confusion and high casualty rates of both the Normandy Landings and the Battle of the Bulge, in order to bolster the strength of a depleted infantry regiment, companies and even battalions were moved around as necessary.

The U.S. Army also created independent tank battalions to attach to infantry divisions during World War II in order to give them fire support.

From the 1960s through the early 1980s, a typical maneuver (infantry or tank) battalion had five companies: headquarters and headquarters company (HHC) and A, B and C Companies, plus a combat support company (CSC), with a scout platoon, 107 mm (4.2 inch) heavy mortar platoon, along with other elements that varied between organisations. These included heavy anti-tank TOW missile platoons, ground surveillance radar sections and man-portable air-defense system sections. Beginning in the early 1980s, some elements of the combat support companies (the mortar and scout platoons) were merged into the headquarters company with the staff and support elements, others were moved to their parent type organisation (ground surveillance radar and air defence), and in infantry battalions the heavy anti-tank missile platoon was organized as a separate company (E Company). In the late 1980s, there was a fourth "line" company added (D Company) in most infantry and tank battalions.

In this older structure, U.S. Army mechanised infantry battalions and tank battalions, for tactical purposes, task-organised companies to each other, forming a battalion-sized task force (TF).

Starting in 2005–2006, the U.S. Army's mechanised and tank battalions were reorganised into combined arms battalions (CABs). Tank battalions and mechanised infantry battalions no longer exist. These new combined arms battalions are modular units, each consisting of a headquarters company, two mechanized infantry companies, two tank companies and a forward support company attached from the battalion's parent brigade support battalion. This new structure eliminated the need to task-organize companies between battalions; each combined arms battalion was organically composed of the requisite companies. At a higher level, each armored brigade (formerly designated 'heavy brigade') is now composed of three CABs (versus the two CABs of a former heavy brigade), one reconnaissance squadron, one artillery battalion, one brigade engineer battalion (BEB) and one brigade support battalion (BSB).

=== United States Marine Corps ===
A United States Marine Corps battalion includes the battalion headquarters, consisting of the commanding officer (usually a lieutenant colonel, sometimes a colonel), an executive officer (the second-in-command, usually a major), the sergeant major and the executive staff (S-1 through S-4 and S-6). The battalion headquarters is supported by a headquarters and service company (battery). A battalion usually contains two to five organic companies (batteries in the artillery), with a total of 500 to 1,200 Marines in the battalion. A regiment consists of a regimental headquarters, a headquarters company (or battery) and two to five organic battalions (Marine infantry regiments – three battalions of infantry; Marine artillery regiments – three to five battalions of artillery; Marine combat logistics regiments – one to three combat logistics battalions). In the U.S. Marine Corps, the brigade designation is used only in "Marine Expeditionary Brigade" (MEB). An MEB is one of the standard Marine Air-Ground Task Forces (MAGTF), is commanded by a brigadier general or major general, and consists of command element, a ground combat element (usually one reinforced Marine infantry regiment), an aviation combat element (a reinforced Marine aircraft group including rotary wing, fixed wing and tiltrotor aircraft) and a combat logistics element (a Marine combat logistics regiment, which includes naval construction forces [Seabees] and naval medical elements).

In the U.S. Marine Corps, an infantry or "rifle" battalion typically consists of a headquarters and service company, three rifle or "line" companies (designated alphabetically A through M depending upon which battalion of the parent regiment to which they are attached) and a weapons company. Weapons companies do not receive a letter designation. Marine infantry regiments use battalion and company designations as described above under World War II, with company letters D, H and M not normally used but rather held in reserve for use in augmenting a fourth rifle company into each battalion as needed.

United States Marine Corps infantry battalions are task organised into Battalion Landing Teams (BLTs) as the ground combat element (GCE) of a Marine Expeditionary Unit (MEU). A standard U.S. Marine infantry battalion is typically supported by an artillery battery and a platoon each of tanks, amphibious assault vehicles, light armoured reconnaissance vehicles, reconnaissance Marines and combat engineers. The battalion structure is designed to readily expand to include a fourth rifle company, if required, as described above under battalion organisation. Often Air Naval Gunfire Liaison Company (ANGLICO) officers are assigned to the battalion, to coordinate naval gunfire support.

=== United States Navy ===
The United States Navy has construction battalions and navy cargo handling battalions. They are structured roughly analogous to an Army or Marine Corps battalion with staff and commanding officers of similar grade and experience.

== Myanmar ==
In Myanmar (Army, People's Defence Force and various EAOs), battalions (or regiments), called Tat Yinn (တပ်ရင်း), are the main maneuver units.

As for structure, infantry battalions were structured with 27 officers and 750 other ranks back in 1966 under a structure organisation named of ကဖ/၇၀(၈)/၆၆. This was revised in 1988 to 814 men and then revised again in 2001 as 31 officers and 826 other ranks under a structure organisation named ကဖ/၇၀-ဆ/၂၀၀၁.

Even though the authorised strength of the structure changed, the core of the battalion structure remains roughly the same with battalion/regimental HQ housing command elements (OC, 2IC, adjutant, quartermaster, RSM, RQMS, R.P sergeant etc.), an HQ company (containing support platoons such as engineer, signal, medical etc.) and 4 rifle companies (for example: No. (1) Rifle Company, No. (2) Rifle Company, No. (3) Rifle Company and No. (4) Rifle Company). The 4 rifle companies and the HQ company are for combat troops whereas the battalion/regimental HQ is for command elements.

According to some observers, the average manpower of the battalions has substantially declined: from 670+ in 1988, 350+ in 1998, to 250+ in 2008. A leaked document reported in the international media revealed that in late 2006, the Tatmadaw had 284 battalions with fewer than 200 personnel, and 220 battalions with between 200 and 300 personnel.

As of January 2024, most battalions/regiments of the army are reported to have less than 150 men. Within these battalions, only around 80 men are fit for actual combat. Due to such manpower shortages, the army has been reportedly drawing out 30,000 men from combat support service battalions as of late 2023 (signal, supply and transport battalions for example).

== See also ==
- Indonesian Army infantry battalions
- March battalion
- Military organization
