= Christopher Conyers =

Christopher Conyers may refer to:

- Christopher Conyers, 2nd Baron Conyers (c. 1491–1538), English baron and aristocrat
- Sir Christopher Conyers, 2nd Baronet (1621–1693), of the Conyers baronets
- Christopher Conyers of Hornby, owner of Crakehall c.1400 and ancestor of the Conyers baronets
- Christopher Conyers (bailiff of Richmond) (died 1461 or 1465), English fifteenth-century Yorkist knight
