= Battle of Edgcote =

1469 battle in the English Wars of the Roses

Coordinates: 52°06′52″N 1°14′50″W

- Part of the Wars of the Roses
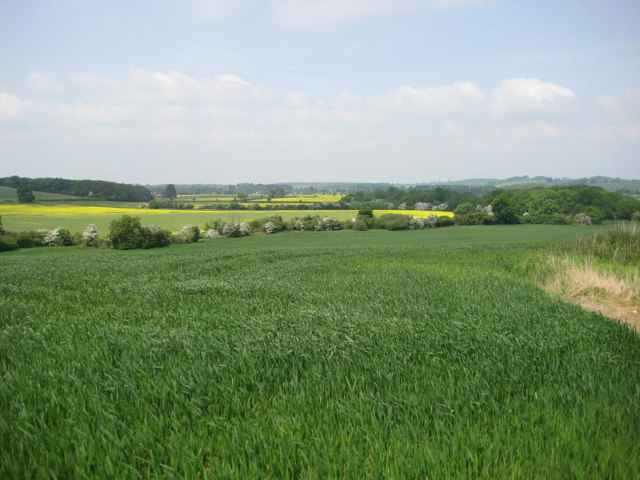
- Photograph of Danes Moor, site of the battle.
Date	24 July 1469
Location	Danes Moor, Northamptonshire, England
Result	Rebel victory

Belligerents
House of York (royal)	House of York (rebel)

Commanders and leaders
Earl of Pembroke (executed); Earl of Devon (executed)	Robin of Redesdale †; Sir William Conyers; Sir Geoffrey Gate; Sir William Parr

Strength
Pembroke; estimated 3,000–5,000; Devon; estimated 800–1,500	Estimated 3,000–5,000

Casualties and losses
168 knights and gentry, c. 2,000 others	Unknown

The Battle of Edgcote (also known as the Battle of Banbury or the Battle of Danes Moor) took place on 24 July 1469, during the Wars of the Roses. It was fought between a royal army, commanded by the earls of Pembroke and Devon, and a rebel force led by supporters of the Earl of Warwick.

The battle took place 6 miles (9.7 km) northeast of Banbury in Oxfordshire; it resulted in a rebel victory which temporarily handed power over to the Earl of Warwick. By September, though, Edward IV of England was back in control, and Warwick found himself in a situation similar to the one before the battle, prompting him to plan a second rebellion. After Edgcote there was no turning back. Edward could no longer trust him fully and he was inexorably moving towards becoming a Lancastrian.

Edgcote has a reputation for being one of the least well-documented battles of the period, though numerous contemporary, or near contemporary, records and chronicles refer to it. Details in accounts diverge in terms of numbers, leaders, casualties, and the course of the fighting, but not all of these "divergences" are contradictory. The heavy casualties suffered by Pembroke's Welsh forces made it a popular topic for Welsh poets.

== Background ==
Key locations, Edgcote campaign July 1469

Close allies in deposing Henry VI in 1461, by 1469 the relationship between Warwick and Edward IV had broken down. After marrying Elizabeth Woodville in 1464, Edward increasingly relied on her family, who competed with the Nevilles for lands and positions. Concerned by his close connection with Warwick, Edward blocked a proposed marriage between Clarence, his younger brother and heir, and Warwick's eldest daughter Isabel. For various reasons, Clarence greatly resented this.

In April 1469, a revolt broke out in Yorkshire, under a leader called Robin of Redesdale. His true identity is unknown. Numerous candidates have been suggested: Sir John Conyers, steward of Warwick's Middleham Castle, either of his sons, another John Conyers or Sir William Conyers of Marske (d. 1469), Sir Richard Welles, and Sir Henry Neville. Alternatively, he could have been an unknown commoner, a "villain called Robin of Riddesdale" as described in Jean de Waurin's Chronicle. In May, a second rebellion began, led by a figure known as Robin of Holderness, demanding the restoration of Henry Percy, traditional Earl of Northumberland.

John Neville, the current Earl, quickly suppressed this and executed its leader, although he made little attempt to intercept Robin of Redesdale. Confident the rebellion was well in hand and accompanied only by his personal household troops, Edward moved slowly north through Lincolnshire, reaching Crowland in early July. On 9 July, he discovered the rebel army was considerably larger than previously advised, followed by even more disturbing news from London.

Warwick and Clarence spent the summer assembling troops, allegedly to help suppress the revolt; in early July, they travelled to Calais, where Clarence married Isabel in a ceremony conducted by Warwick's brother George, Archbishop of York. The three men then issued a 'remonstrance', listing alleged abuses by the Woodvilles, William Herbert, Earl of Pembroke and Humphrey Stafford, Earl of Devon among others. They entered London on 12 July, and on 18th, marched north with to link up with the Yorkshire rebels.

Edward withdrew to Nottingham and sent urgent instructions to Pembroke in Raglan Castle and Devon in Dorchester, ordering them to meet him there with as many men as they could muster. The northern rebels headed for Northampton, intending to link up with Warwick and Clarence. A small skirmish was fought in the area of Northampton, before the Royal forces retreated towards Banbury. The army camped on Edgcote Lodge Hill and late in the afternoon of 23 July, a brief skirmish was fought between the Royal picquets and the rebel outriders. Sir Henry Neville was captured in the skirmish, and killed after attempting to yield. Pembroke himself, together with the other commander, Devon, were in lodgings in Banbury. According to most of the chroniclers they had a disagreement over lodgings, and Devon retired, taking his part of the army with him. Devon reportedly took his troops ten or twelve miles away. Tradition has it he retreated to Deddington Castle, but there is no contemporary evidence that this was his final location.

== Battle ==
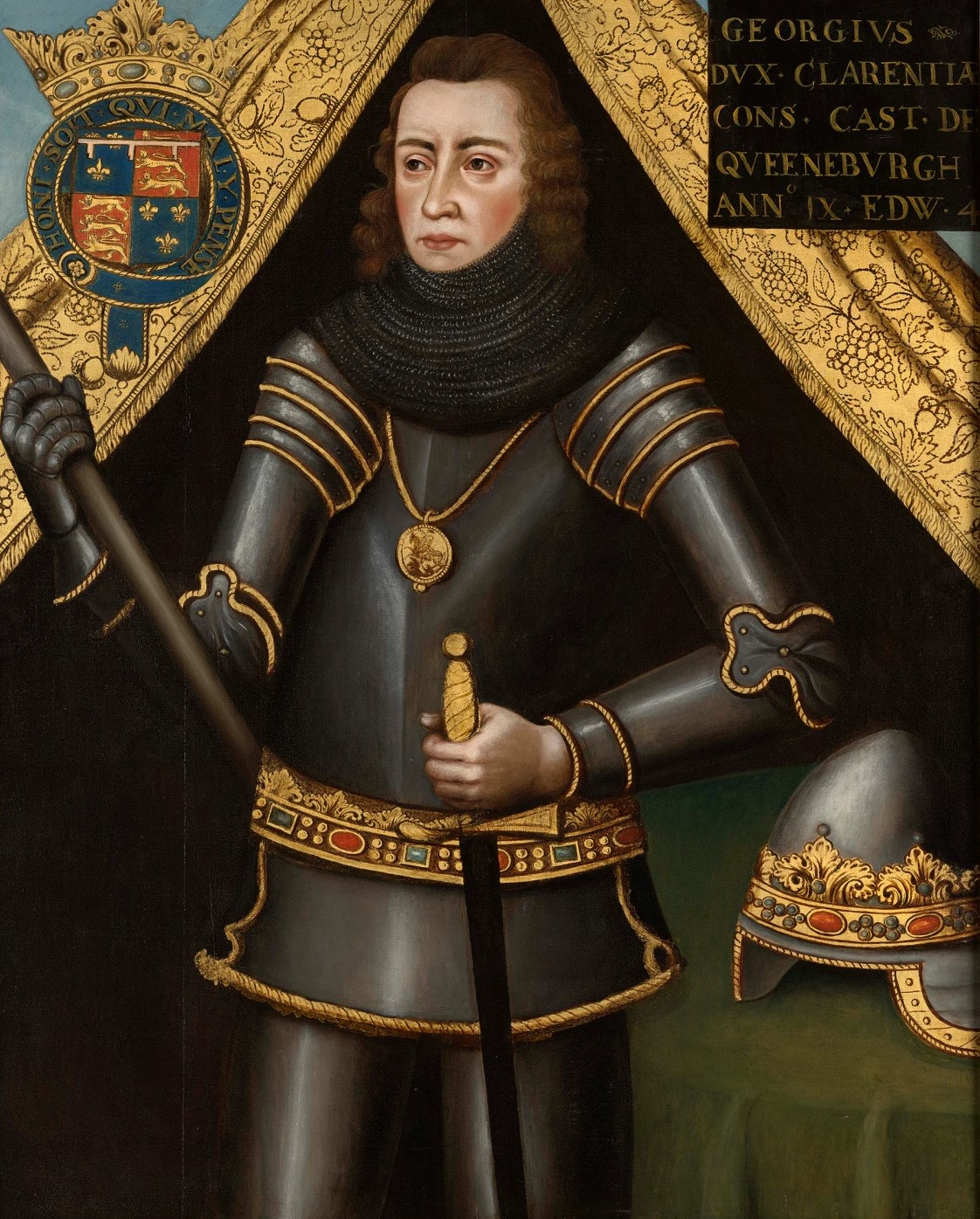
George, Duke of Clarence; his alliance with Warwick drove the rebellion

Estimates suggest Pembroke had some 3,000 to 5,000 Welsh knights and spearmen, with 800 to 1,500 under Devon, including most of the archers. Aware of the need to destroy the northern army before they were reinforced, Pembroke's army was camped overnight on high ground to the north-east. This overlooked the site of the 914 CE Battle of Danes Moor, with the two armies separated by a tributary of the River Cherwell.

The rebel army contained a large contingent of archers, putting Pembroke at a disadvantage; he ordered his troops forward and the two sides fought at close quarters for the rest of the morning. By early afternoon, the Royal army had gained control of the river crossing, but at this point, Warwick's advance guard arrived upon the field, led by Sir Geoffrey Gates and Sir William Parr. Gates and Parr were able to hold the rebels together, but they were still under severe pressure when further rebel reinforcements arrived, led by John Clapham.

In one account Devon was still present, and fled at this point. However, what ever was the case, the Royal army believed this to be Warwick and his forces. Pembroke's men broke. Casualties were reported as 168 knights and gentry, plus 2,000 rank and file, losses significant enough to be remembered and referenced by Welsh poets a century later. Pembroke was captured and executed at Northampton later in the week, on Thursday 27 July; his brother Sir Richard Herbert had been executed the previous day, Wednesday 26 July. Their half brother Sir Richard Vaughan died during the battle and Devon was beheaded at Bridgwater on 17 August.

There are few details on rebel casualties but they would have been considerably less than those suffered by Pembroke since most deaths occurred during a pursuit. Apart from Henry Neville, killed on the evening before the battle, these included Sir William Conyers, and Sir Oliver Dudley, youngest son of John Sutton, 1st Baron Dudley.

== Aftermath ==
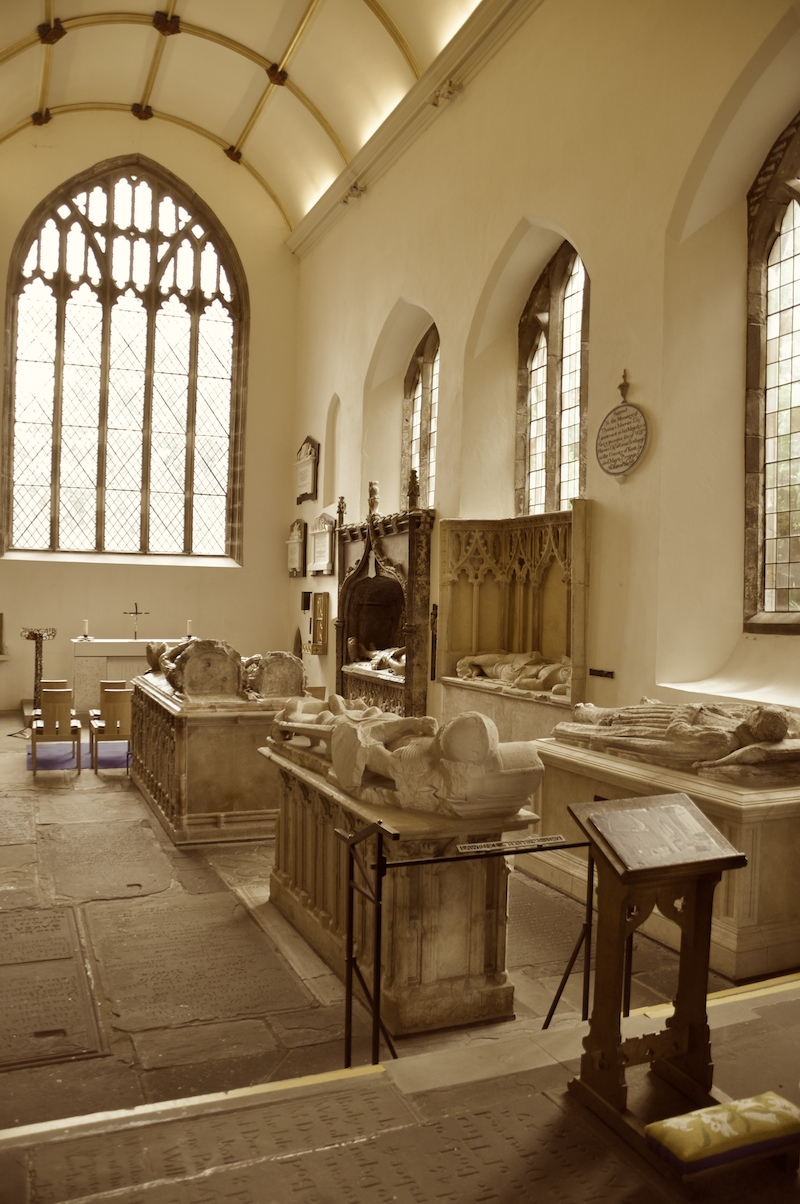
Herbert chapel, Abergavenny Priory

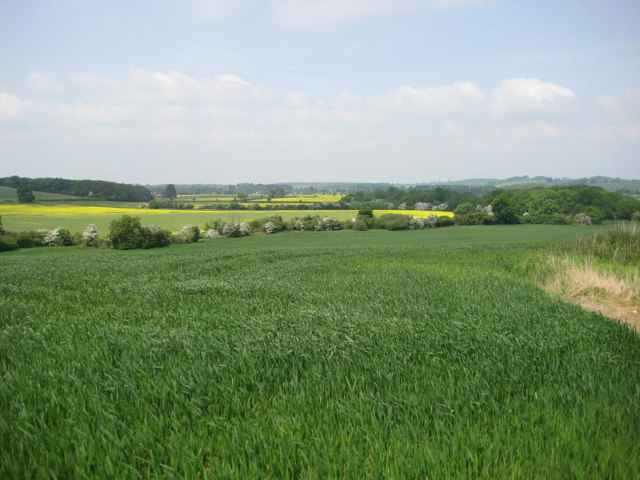
Danes Moor, site of the battle

Edward was taken into custody and held in Middleham Castle. His in-laws Earl Rivers and John Woodville were executed at Gosford Green Coventry on 12 August 1469. There is no evidence of any summary trial taking place. However, it soon became clear there was little support for Warwick or Clarence; Edward was released in September and resumed the throne.

Richard Herbert was buried in the Herbert chapel at Abergavenny Priory, which survived the damage caused during the Dissolution of the Monasteries in 1536 to 1541. It also includes the tomb of William Herbert's illegitimate son, Richard Herbert of Ewyas, who was brought up with Henry Tudor, later Henry VII and fought on his side at Bosworth in 1485.

== Commemoration and re-enactments ==
On 12 and 13 September 2009 there was a re-creation of the battle on the actual battlefield, staged by the Medieval Siege Society and the English Tournament Society to commemorate the 540th anniversary.

Following the success of the 2009 commemoration and re-enactment, a second recreation was staged on 11 and 12 September 2010 for the 541st anniversary.

The 550th anniversary was the subject of several activities organised by the Northamptonshire Battlefields Society, the Medieval Siege Society no longer being actively involved in events connected with Edgcote. These activities included a day conference highlighting new research, and the publication of a book. The Society also organises an annual walk to commemorate the battle on the anniversary itself. Details can be found on the Society's Facebook page.

In 2021 Edgcote was one of eight Wars of the Roses battles commemorated on stamps issued by the Royal Mail to mark the 550th anniversary of the Battle of Tewkesbury. The stamps used paintings by noted historical artist Graham Turner, and included a presentation pack with notes by historian David Grummitt. Controversy arose because the Edgcote stamp was incorrectly labelled "Edgecote Moor", and the accompanying presentation pack stated the date of the battle as being 26 July. These errors were highlighted by the Northamptonshire Battlefields Society, and the story was picked up by BBC Radio Northampton, and subsequently reported on the BBC website. The Royal Mail issued a statement saying they were aware of the controversy over the name, but had chosen to go with their expert's recommendation, although both the spelling of "Edgecote", and the place name "Edgecote Moor" do not appear in the Royal Mail postal address database.

== Threats ==
The Registered Battlefield area is described by Historic England as "largely undeveloped" and that " comparisons with other War of the Roses sites indicates that a high order of archaeological potential can be anticipated here". In August 2020 One Planet Ltd, experts in obtaining planning permission for renewable energy projects submitted a screening proposal on behalf of the landowners, Culworth Grounds, requesting the waiver of an Environmental Impact Assessment ahead of a full planning application. The proposal places the development on the "East Hill" mentioned in the sources, at the heart of the fighting. The development will have considerable visual impact on the location, as it will be surrounded by high "deer fences" and CCTV cameras on poles. Despite opposition from Historic England, NCC Archaeology, the Battlefields Trust, the Northamptonshire Battlefields Society and numerous members of the public, the waiver was granted, principally on the grounds that at 40 years lifespan the development is regarded as temporary and reversible. Heritage groups continue to express their concern, and objections to the formal planning application are anticipated.

The proposed route of HS2 passes along the North Eastern edge of the registered battlefield, but by-passes Danes Moor, the location of the fighting.

== Historiographical errors ==
Two major errors in respect of the battle have entered the historiography of the battle, through excessive reliance on one or two major sources in English. The first is the reference to the battle as "Edgecote Moor". A review of all of the primary or near primary records show that the battle was known as Edgcote (although contemporary spellings varied), Banbury or Danes Moor, as stated above. In the 19th century it was referred to as "The Battle of Edgecote", before the Ordnance Survey standardised the spelling to Edgcote on or before 1884. "Edgecote Moor" is a more recent affectation, combining "Edgecote" and "Danes Moor", and dates from the mid 1990s. Uniquely amongst battles in the Wars of the Roses modern writers have not consistently used the modern day spelling.

The second error relates to the date of the battle. Welsh sources, and contemporary English official records, such as the Coventry Leet Book, and early chronicles clearly place the battle of the eve of the Feast of Saint James, or Monday, 24 July 1469. The reference to 26 July comes from Warkworth's Chronicle, and is repeated in Hall, who places the battle the day after the Feast of Saint James. Hall's work, as it contains the most detail, has then formed the basis for most descriptions and accounts of the battle. The error in respect of the date was identified as early as 1982, and has been restated particularly by Welsh scholars. This has been overlooked by English writers, with the notable exception of Michael Hicks who places the battle on 24 July.

== Sources ==
- Evans, Graham (2019). The Battle of Edgcote 1469. Northamptonshire Battlefields Society. ISBN 978-1794611078.
- Gillingham, John (1982). The Wars of the Roses (1990 ed.). Weidenfeld & Nicolson. ISBN 978-0297820161.
- Lewis, Barry (2011). "The Battle of Edgecote or Banbury (1469) Through the Eyes of Contemporary Welsh Poets". In Curry, Anne; Bell, Adrian (eds.). Soldiers, Weapons and Armies in the Fifteenth Century. Journal of Medieval Military History. Vol. IX. Boydell Press. pp. 97–117. ISBN 978-1843836681.
- Penn, Thomas (2019). The Brothers York: An English Tragedy. Allen Lane. ISBN 978-1846146909.
- Weir, Alison (1995). Lancaster & York; the Wars of the Roses (2009 ed.). Vintage. ISBN 978-0099540175.
