= Christopher Conyers (Yorkist) =

Christopher Conyers of Hornby, Yorkshire (d. 1461 x 1465) was a member of the fifteenth century English gentry, prominent in the local politics of northern England (specifically Yorkshire) and the early years of the Wars of the Roses.

== Early years, marriages and children ==
The son and heir of John Conyers of Hornby (d. c. 1412), he married Ellen, the daughter of Roleston in November 1415. After Ellen's death in 1433, he married one Margaret Waddesley. Between his two wives he produced twenty-five children, twelve being sons; 'unusually,' notes Rosemary Horrox, he was able to provide for many of his younger sons, rather than just the eldest, as was usual. Horrox puts this down to the fact that his heir had married the daughter and coheir of Philip, Lord Darcy, which provided Conyers with a source of income, as well as the fact that he arranged good marriages for many of them. His ability to do so, she continues, demonstrates his 'good standing' in the region. This standing is also reflected in his acting as a feoffee for local man John Waddesford of Kirklington, North Yorkshire, and bearing witness to the exchange of deeds in a property exchange between Richard Clairvaux and John, Lord Scrope of Bolton.

== Service of the Nevilles ==
Although never knighted or made Sheriff of his county, he was appointed bailiff of the Honour of Richmond in 1436, during the earl of Salisbury's tenure of the Honour. The same year, Conyers acted as feoffee to uses of Salisbury's will, (due to Salisbury's appointment to royal service in France, in the latter days of the Hundred Years' War) which meant that if his mother died whilst the earl was abroad, her estates would be controlled by Conyers and others on Salisbury's behalf, rather than temporarily returning to the king.

== Later career ==
In 1464 he was commissioned (alongside Salisbury's son, the earl of Warwick, and Lords Greystoke and Fitzhugh) to recapture castles in Northumberland (Bamburgh, Alnwick and Dunstanburgh) that were held by the remnants of the Lancastrian army.
