= Robin of Redesdale =

English rebel leader

Robin of Redesdale (fl. 1469), sometimes called "Robin Mend-All", was the leader of an insurrection against Edward IV of England. His true identity is unknown, but is thought to have been either Sir John Conyers (d. 1490), steward of Middleham, his brother Sir William Conyers of Marske (d. 1469), or both; the two were long-serving retainers of Richard Neville, Earl of Warwick. Graham Evans lists a number of other possibilities such as Sir John Conyers (d. 1490), the father of the previous Sir John and Sir William; Sir Richard Welles (d. 1470), who married Baroness Willoughby de Eresby; her son, Sir Robert Welles (d. 1470), 8th Baron Willoughby de Eresby; or Lord Robert Ogle, Warden of the East March and Lord of Redesdale (d. 1469).

Close allies in deposing Henry VI in 1461, by 1469 Warwick and Edward had fallen out. After marrying Elizabeth Woodville in 1464, Edward increasingly relied on her family, who competed with the Nevilles for lands and positions. He also blocked a proposal that his younger brother and heir, George, Duke of Clarence, should marry Warwick's eldest daughter Isabel Neville.

In April 1469, a revolt broke out in Yorkshire, under Robin of Redesdale, protesting against taxes and 'abuses of power'. This was followed in May by a second rebellion, under a figure known as Robin of Holderness, demanding the restoration of Henry Percy, traditional Earl of Northumberland. This was quickly suppressed by John Neville, the Earl of Montagu, who killed its leader but Robin of Redesdale escaped him.

On 26 July, the rebels defeated a Royal army commanded by the Earl of Pembroke at the Battle of Edgcote. Although they were victorious, Robin was reported to have died in the battle, hence his identification with William Conyers who was killed at Edgcote. His mantle was temporarily assumed by someone else, apparently Sir John Conyers, when Warwick raised a further rebellion early in 1470. This second "Robin of Redesdale" submitted to Edward IV in March 1470.

== Sources ==
- Evans, Graham (2019). The Battle of Edgcote 1469. Northamptonshire Battlefields Society. ISBN 978-1-79461-107-8.
- Gillingham, John (1982). The Wars of the Roses (1990 ed.). London: Weidenfeld & Nicolson. ISBN 978-0-297-82016-1.
- Penn, Thomas (2019). The Brothers York: An English Tragedy. London: Allen Lane. ISBN 978-1-84614-690-9.
