= Spearman (military) =

A spearman is an ancient infantry or cavalry combat unit which was armed with a spear, and in some cases, a shield.

In popular culture a 'spearman' is an early melee unit found in Civilization games. Its primary role is to be used for attacking or defending against mounted units.
