= Richard Neville, 16th Earl of Warwick =

English nobleman, politician and military commander (1428–1471)

The Right Honourable The Earl of Warwick KG
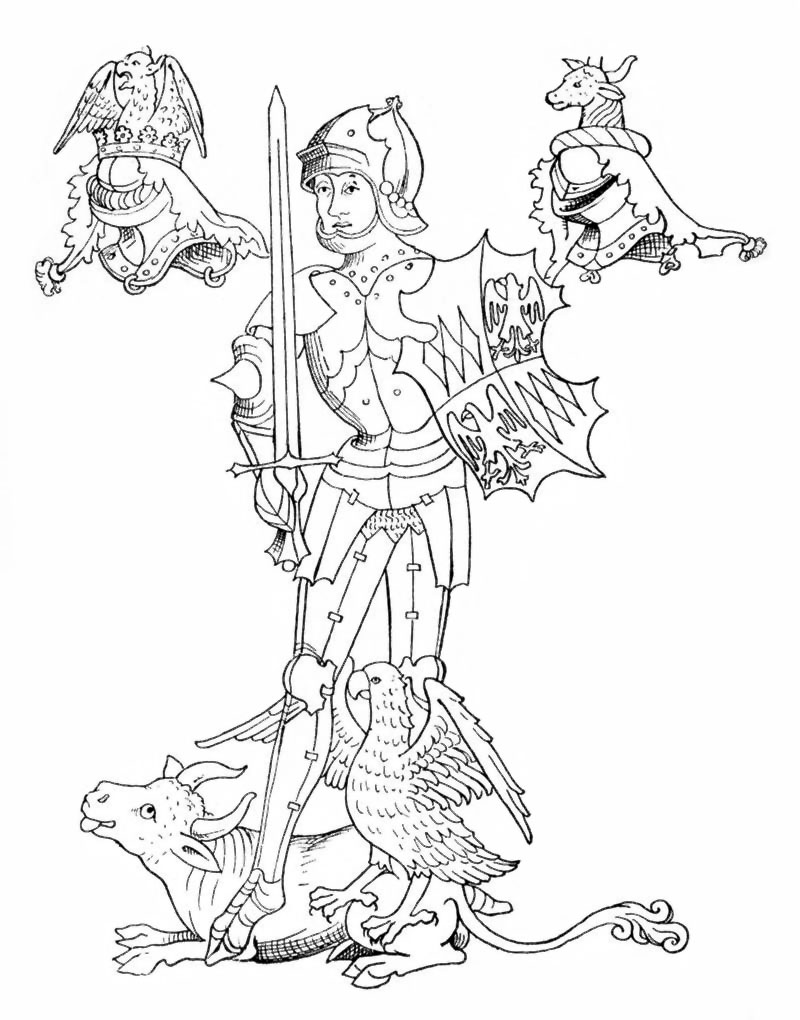
- Warwick as drawn in the Rous Roll. He displays on his shield the arms of Montagu quartering Monthermer. The bull's head is the crest of the Neville family, the eagle is the crest of Montagu.
- Tenure: 23 July 1449 – 14 April 1471
- Predecessor: Anne Beauchamp, 15th Countess of Warwick
- Successor: Edward Plantagenet, 17th Earl of Warwick
- Other titles: 6th Earl of Salisbury; 5th Baron Montagu; 7th Baron Monthermer
- Other names: Warwick the Kingmaker
- Known for: Influence during the Wars of the Roses
- Born: 22 November 1428
- Died: 14 April 1471 (aged 42); Barnet, Hertfordshire, England
- Buried: Bisham Abbey, Berkshire
- Residence: Middleham Castle, etc.
- Locality: Warwickshire; Yorkshire
- Wars and battles: Wars of the Roses: First Battle of St Albans; Battle of Ludford Bridge; Battle of Northampton; Second Battle of St Albans; Battle of Ferrybridge; Battle of Towton; Battle of Barnet †
- Offices: Captain of Calais; Lord High Admiral of England; Steward of the Duchy of Lancaster
- Noble family: Neville
- Spouse: Anne Beauchamp, 16th Countess of Warwick (m. 1436)
- Issue: Isabel, Duchess of Clarence; Anne, Queen of England; Margaret (illegitimate)
- Parents: Richard Neville, 5th Earl of Salisbury (father); Alice Montagu, 5th Countess of Salisbury (mother)
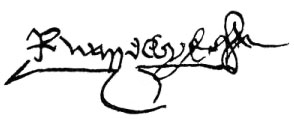
- Signature

Richard Neville, 16th Earl of Warwick, 6th Earl of Salisbury (22 November 1428 – 14 April 1471), known as Warwick the Kingmaker, was an English nobleman, administrator, landowner of the House of Neville fortune and military commander. The eldest son of Richard Neville, 5th Earl of Salisbury, he became Earl of Warwick through marriage, and was the wealthiest and most powerful English peer of his age, with political connections that went beyond the country's borders. One of the principal leaders in the Wars of the Roses (1455–1487), originally on the Yorkist side but later switching to the Lancastrian side, he was instrumental in the rise of a king and the deposition of two, which led to his epithet of "Kingmaker".

Through fortunes of marriage and inheritance, Warwick emerged in the 1450s at the centre of English politics. Originally, he was a supporter of King Henry VI; a territorial dispute with Edmund Beaufort, 2nd Duke of Somerset, led him to collaborate with his uncle, Richard, Duke of York, in opposing the king. From this conflict, he gained the strategically valuable post of Captain of Calais, a position that benefited him greatly in the years to come. The political conflict later turned into rebellion, where in battle York was slain, as was Warwick's father, Salisbury. York's son and Warwick's cousin later triumphed with Warwick's assistance and was crowned King Edward IV. Edward initially ruled with Warwick's support, but the two later fell out over foreign policy and the king's choice to marry Elizabeth Woodville. After a failed plot to crown Edward's brother, George, Duke of Clarence, Warwick instead restored Henry VI to the throne. The triumph was short-lived, on 14 April 1471, Warwick was defeated and killed by Edward at the Battle of Barnet.

Warwick's historical legacy has been a matter of much dispute. Historical opinion has alternated between seeing him as self-centred and rash, regarding him as a victim of the whims of an ungrateful king. It is generally agreed that he enjoyed great popularity in all layers of society, and that he was skilled at appealing to popular sentiments for political support.

== Background ==
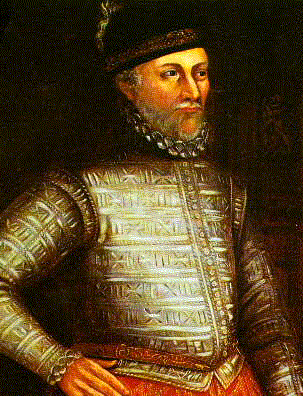
Warwick the Kingmaker, 16th century imaginary portrait

The Neville family, an ancient Durham family, came to prominence in England's fourteenth-century wars against the Scots. In 1397, King Richard II granted Ralph Neville the title of Earl of Westmorland. Ralph's son Richard, the later Earl of Warwick's father, was a younger son by a second marriage, and not heir to the earldom. (Note: This second marriage was to Joan Beaufort, daughter of John of Gaunt) He received a favourable settlement, however, and became jure uxoris ("by right of his wife") Earl of Salisbury through his marriage to Alice, daughter and heiress of Thomas Montagu, 4th Earl of Salisbury. (Note: He was created Earl of Salisbury 7 May 1429) (Note: Warwick was jure uxoris ("by right of his wife") 16th Earl of Warwick from 1449, and in his own right was 6th Earl of Salisbury and 5th Baron Montagu from 1463)

Salisbury's son Richard, the later Earl of Warwick, was born on 22 November 1428; little is known of his childhood. At the age of eight, in 1436, Richard was married to Lady Anne Beauchamp, daughter of Richard de Beauchamp, 13th Earl of Warwick, and of his wife Isabel Despenser. This made him heir not only to the earldom of Salisbury, but also to a substantial part of the Montague, Beauchamp, and Despenser inheritance.

Circumstances would, however, increase his fortune even further. Beauchamp's son Henry, who had married the younger Richard's sister Cecily, died in 1446. When Henry's daughter Anne died in 1449, Richard also found himself jure uxoris Earl of Warwick. (Note: Alice was also joint heir to the Abergavenny lordship) Richard's succession to the estates did not go undisputed, however. A protracted battle over parts of the inheritance ensued, particularly with Edmund Beaufort, 2nd Duke of Somerset, who had married a daughter from Richard Beauchamp's first marriage. The dispute centred on land, not on the Warwick title, as Henry's half-sisters were excluded from the succession.

By 1445 Richard had become a knight, probably at Margaret of Anjou's coronation on 30 May that year; also around this time, his illegitimate daughter, Margaret (who married Richard Huddleston on 12 June 1464) was born.

He is visible in the historical record of the service of King Henry VI in 1449, which makes mention of his services in a grant. He performed military service in the north with his father and might have taken part in the war against Scotland in 1448–1449. When Richard, Duke of York, unsuccessfully rose up against the king in 1452, both Warwick and his father rallied to the side of King Henry VI.

== Civil war ==
=== Discontent at court ===
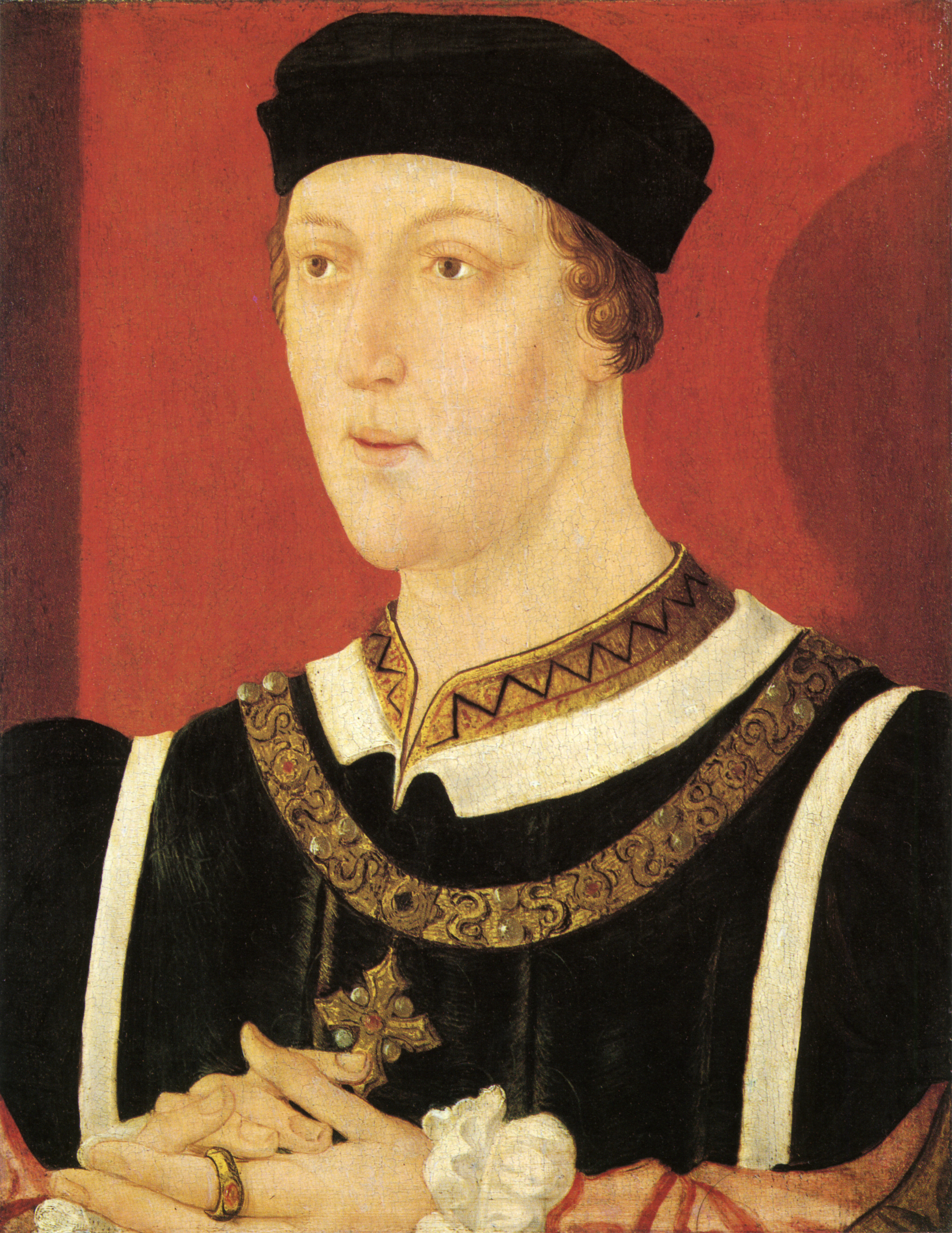
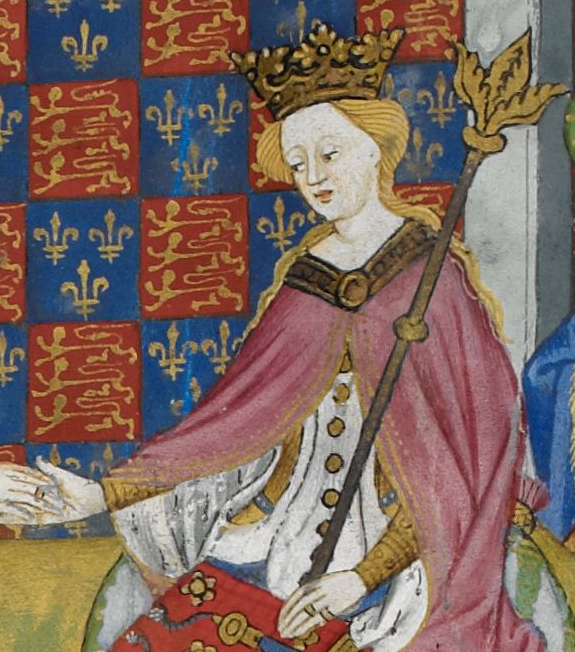
As Henry VI's incompetence and intermittent madness became clear, many of the responsibilities of government fell on his queen, Margaret of Anjou.

In June 1453, Somerset was granted custody of the lordship of Glamorgan—part of the Despenser heritage held by Warwick until then—and open conflict broke out between the two men. Then, in the summer of that year, King Henry fell ill. Somerset was a favourite of the king and Queen Margaret, and with the king incapacitated he was virtually in complete control of the government. This put Warwick at a disadvantage in his dispute with Somerset, and drove him into collaboration with York. The political climate, influenced by the military defeat in France, then started turning against Somerset. On 27 March 1454, a group of royal councillors appointed the Duke of York as protector of the realm. York could now count on the support not only of Warwick but also of Warwick's father Salisbury, who had become more deeply involved in disputes with the House of Percy in the north of England.

York's first protectorate did not last long. Early in 1455, the king rallied sufficiently to return to power, at least nominally, with Somerset again wielding real power. Warwick returned to his estates, as did York and Salisbury, and the three started raising troops. Marching towards London, they encountered the king at St Albans, where the two forces clashed. The battle was brief and not particularly bloody, but it was the first instance of armed hostilities between the forces of the Houses of York and Lancaster in the conflict known as the Wars of the Roses. It was also significant because it resulted in the capture of the king, and the death of Somerset.

=== Continuation of hostilities ===
York's second protectorate that followed was even shorter-lived than the first. At the parliament of February 1456 the king—now under the influence of Queen Margaret—resumed personal government of the realm. By this time Warwick had taken over Salisbury's role as York's main ally, even appearing at that same parliament to protect York from retributions. This conflict was also a pivotal period in Warwick's career, as it was resolved by his appointment as Constable of Calais. The post was to provide him with a vital power base in the following years of conflict. The continental town of Calais, conquered from France in 1347, was not only of vital strategic importance, it also held what was England's largest standing army. There were some initial disputes, with the garrison and with the royal wool monopoly, the Calais Staple, over payments in arrears, but in July Warwick finally took up his post.

After the recent events, Queen Margaret still considered Warwick a threat to the throne, and cut off his supplies. In August 1457, however, a French attack on the English seaport of Sandwich set off fears of a full-scale French invasion. Warwick was again funded to protect the garrison and patrol the English coast. In disregard of royal authority, he then conducted highly successful acts of piracy, against the Castilian fleet in May 1458, and against the Hanseatic fleet a few weeks later. He also used his time on the Continent to establish relations with Charles VII of France and Philip the Good of Burgundy. Developing a solid military reputation and with good international connections, he then brought a part of his garrison to England, where he met up with his father and York in the autumn of 1459.

=== Yorkist Triumph ===
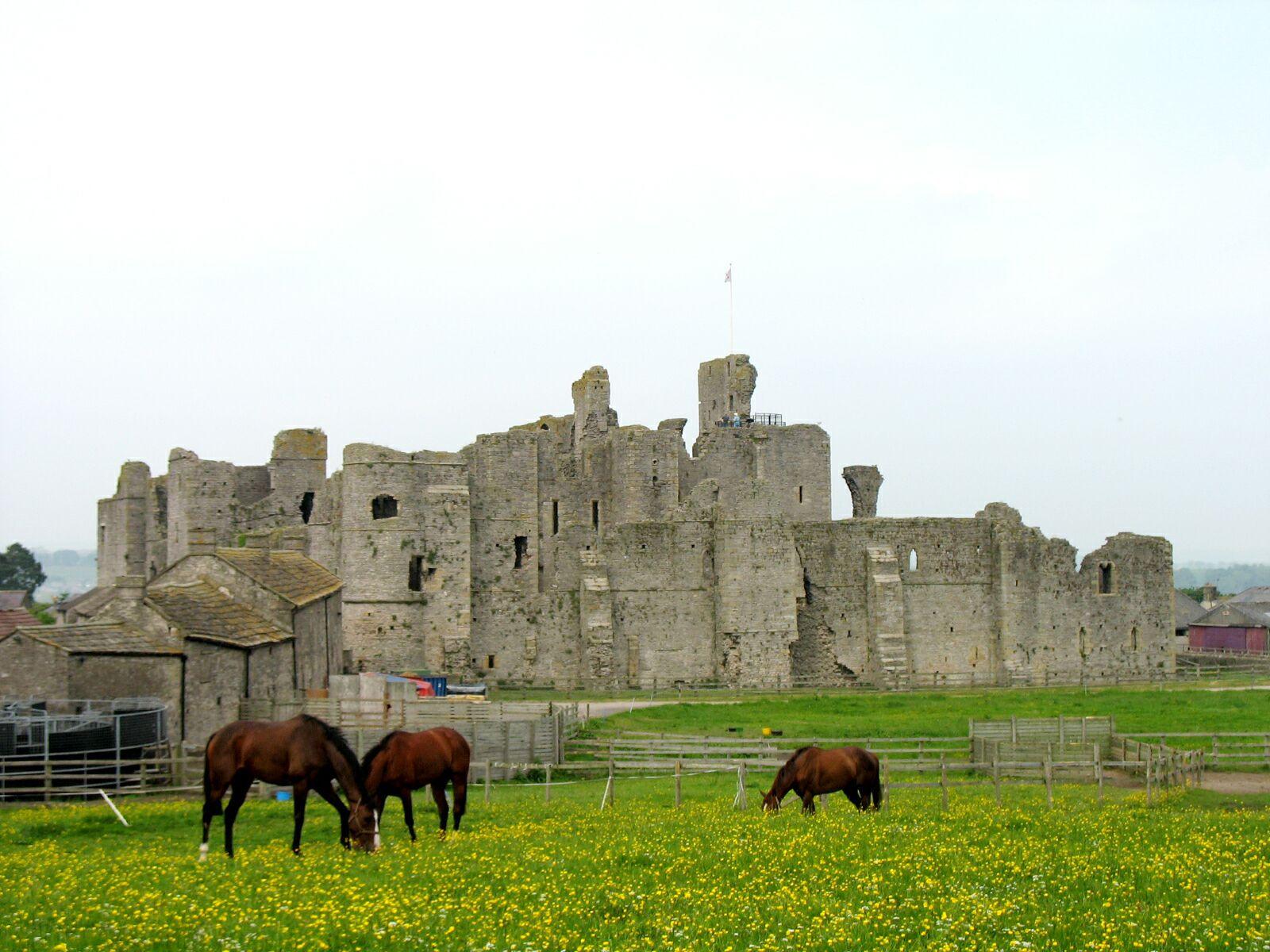
Middleham Castle, now in North Yorkshire, was Warwick's favourite residence in England. In the late 1450s business in Calais in France kept him away from it for periods.

In September 1459 Warwick crossed over to England and made his way north to Ludlow to meet up with York and Salisbury, the latter fresh from his victory over Lancastrians at the Battle of Blore Heath in Staffordshire. At the Battle of Ludford Bridge in Shropshire their forces were scattered by the king's army, partly because of the defection of Warwick's Calais contingent under the command of Andrew Trollope. As it turned out, the majority of the soldiers were still reluctant to raise arms against the king. Forced to flee the country, York left for Dublin, Ireland, with his second son Edmund, Earl of Rutland, while Warwick and Salisbury sailed to Calais, accompanied by the Duke's son, Edward, Earl of March (the future King Edward IV). Henry Beaufort, Duke of Somerset, was appointed to replace Warwick as Captain of Calais, but the Yorkists managed to hold on to the garrison.

In March 1460 Warwick visited York in Ireland to plan the way ahead and returned to Calais. Then, on 26 June, he landed at Sandwich with Salisbury and March, and from here the three earls rode north to London. Salisbury was left to besiege the Tower of London, while Warwick took March with him in pursuit of the king. At the Northampton, on 10 July, King Henry was taken captive, while Humphrey Stafford, 1st Duke of Buckingham and others were killed in battle.

In September York arrived from Ireland, and at the parliament of October that year, the Duke walked up to the throne and put his hand on it. (Note: York was of royal lineage, and—allowing for matrilineal descent—actually had a better claim to the throne than Henry) The act, signifying usurpation, left the assembly in shock. It is unclear whether Warwick had prior knowledge of York's plans, though it is assumed that this had been agreed upon between the two in Ireland the previous March. It soon became clear, however, that this regime change was unacceptable to the lords in parliament, and a compromise was agreed. The Act of Accord of 25 October 1460 stated that while Henry VI was allowed to stay on the throne for the remainder of his life, his son Edward, Prince of Wales, was to be disinherited. Instead, York would succeed the king, and act as protector.

This solution was not ideal to either party, and further conflict was inevitable. On 30 December, at the Battle of Wakefield, York was killed, as were York's second son Edmund, Earl of Rutland, and Warwick's younger brother Thomas. Salisbury was executed a day later. Warwick marched north to confront the enemy, but was defeated and forced to flee at the Second Battle of St Albans. He then joined forces with Prince Edward of York, the new Yorkist claimant to the crown, who had just won an important victory at the Battle of Mortimer's Cross.

While Queen Margaret was hesitating to make her next move, Warwick and Edward hastened to London. The citizens of the capital were scared by the brutal conduct of the Lancastrian forces, and were sympathetic to the House of York. On 4 March the prince was proclaimed King Edward IV by an assembly that gathered quickly. The new king now headed north to consolidate his title and met with the Lancastrian forces at Towton in Yorkshire. Warwick had suffered an injury to the leg the day before, in the Battle of Ferrybridge, and may have played only a minor part in the battle that followed. The unusually bloody battle resulted in a complete victory for the Yorkist forces, and the death of many important men on the opposing side, such as Henry Percy, Earl of Northumberland, and Andrew Trollope. Queen Margaret managed to escape to Scotland, with Henry and Prince Edward. Edward IV returned to London for his coronation, while Warwick remained to pacify the north.

== In power ==
=== Warwick's apex ===
"They have but two rulers, M. de Warwick and another whose name I have forgotten."

— The Governor of Abbeville in a letter to Louis XI

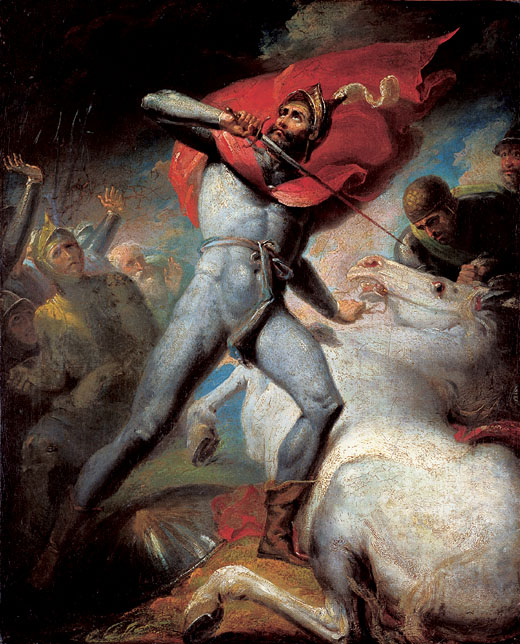
The Earl of Warwick's Vow by Henry Tresham depicting Warwick cutting the throat of his own horse and vowing not to abandon the battlefield prior to the Battle of Towton

Warwick's position after the accession of Edward IV was stronger than ever. He had now succeeded to his father's possessions—including his vast network of retainers—and in 1462 he also inherited his mother's lands and the Salisbury title. Altogether, he had an annual income from his lands of over £7,000, far more than any other man in the realm but the king. Edward confirmed Warwick's position as Captain of Calais, and made him High Admiral of England and Steward of the Duchy of Lancaster, along with several other offices. His brothers also benefited: John Neville, Lord Montagu, was made Warden of the East March in 1463, and the next year created Earl of Northumberland. George Neville, Bishop of Exeter, was confirmed in his post as chancellor by King Edward, and in 1465 promoted to the archbishopric of York.

By late 1461, risings in the north had been put down, and in the summer of 1462, Warwick negotiated a truce with Scotland. In October the same year, Margaret of Anjou invaded England with troops from France, and managed to take the castles of Alnwick and Bamburgh. Warwick had to organise the recapture of the castles, which was accomplished by January 1463. The leaders of the rebellion, including Ralph Percy, were pardoned and left in charge of the retaken castles. At this point, Warwick felt secure enough to travel south; in February he buried the remains of his father and brother at Bisham Priory, and in March he attended parliament at Westminster.

That same spring, however, the north rose up in rebellion once more, when Ralph Percy laid siege to Norham Castle. Warwick returned to the north and rescued Norham in July, but the Lancastrians were left in possession of Northumberland, and the government decided on a diplomatic approach instead. Separate truces were negotiated with Scotland and France by late 1463, which allowed Warwick to retake the Northumbrian castles held by the Lancastrian rebels in the spring of 1464. This time no clemency was given, and around thirty of the rebel leaders were executed.

=== Early tensions ===
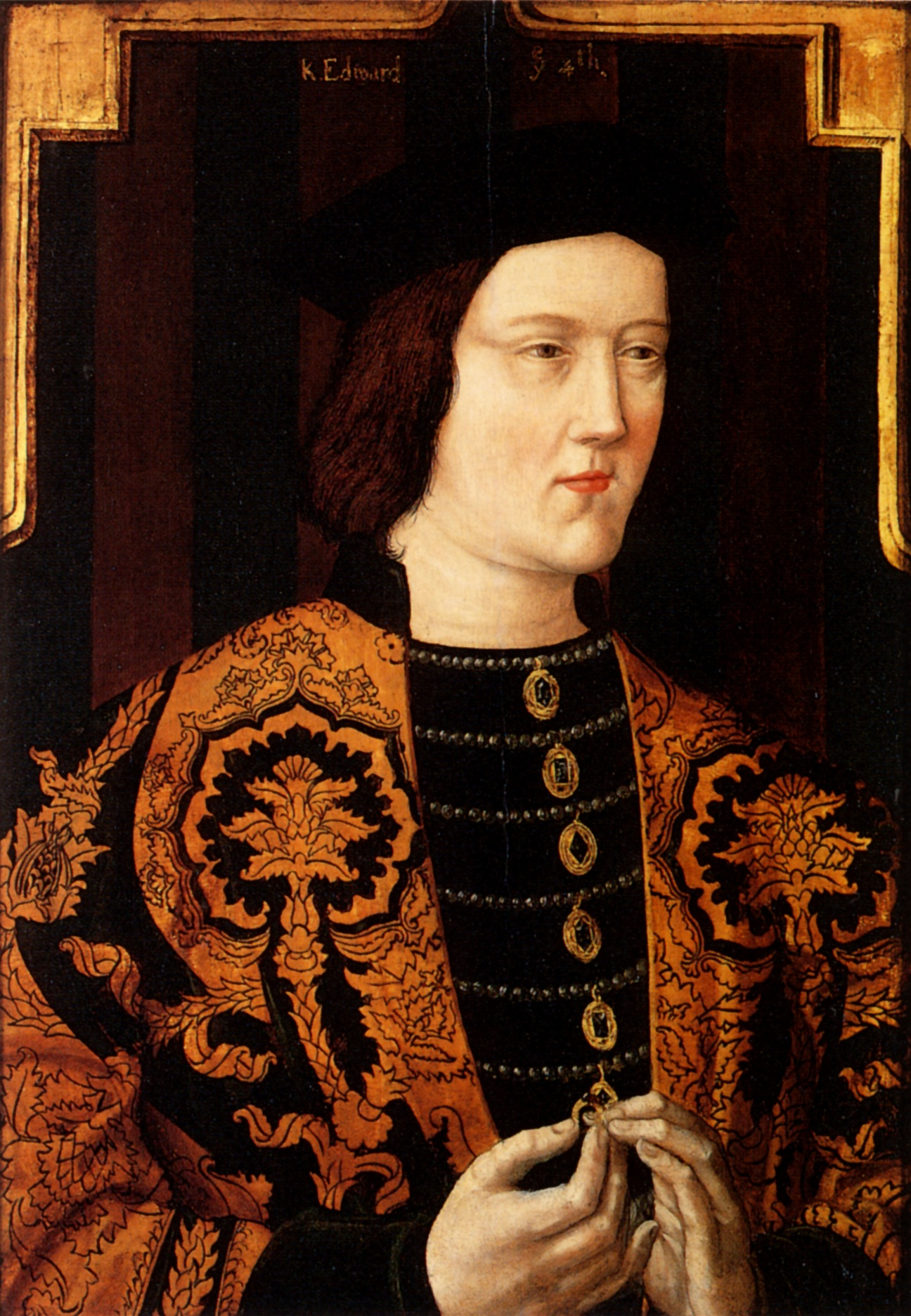
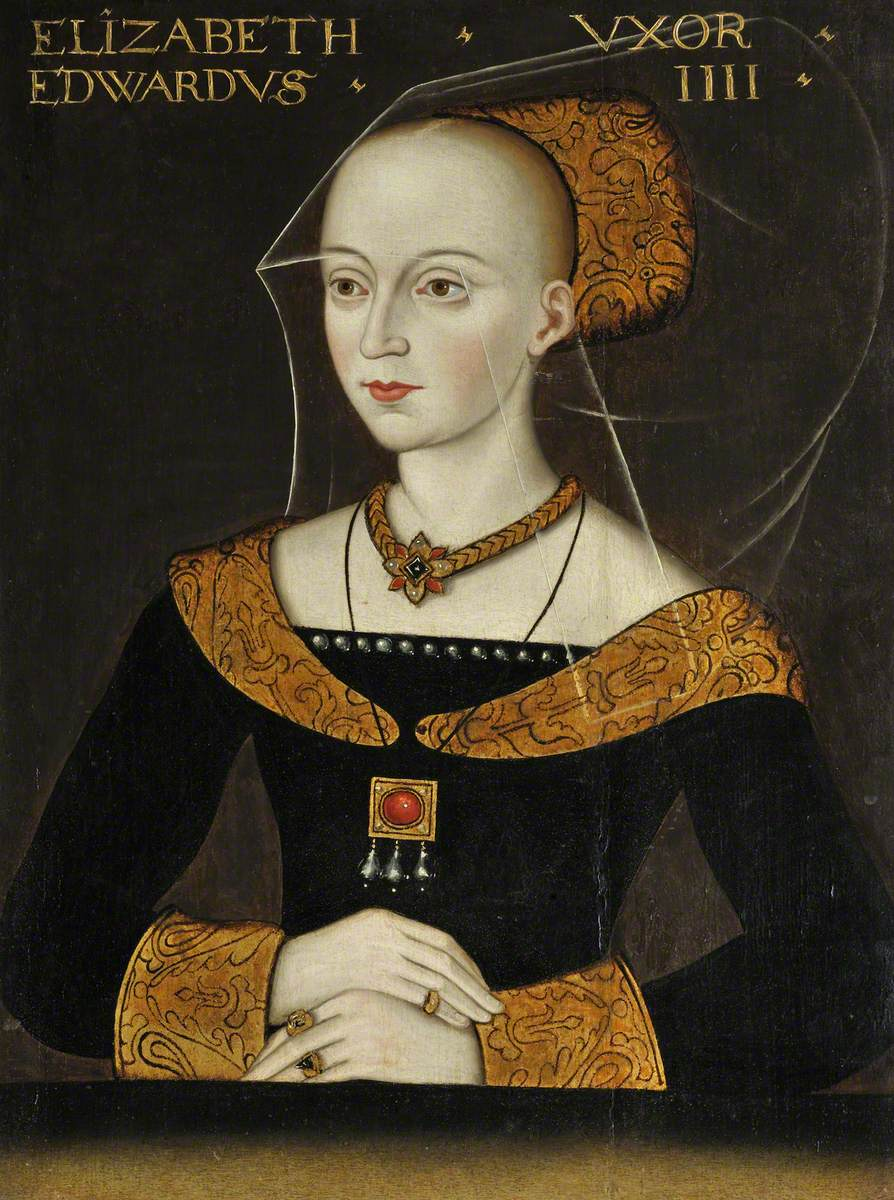
Edward IV's secret marriage to Elizabeth Woodville contributed to the growing tensions between Warwick and the king.

At the negotiations with the French, Warwick had intimated that King Edward was interested in a marriage arrangement with the French crown, the intended bride being Louis XI's sister-in-law, Bona, daughter of Louis, Duke of Savoy. This marriage was not to be, however, because in September 1464, Edward revealed that he was already married, to Elizabeth Woodville. The marriage caused great offence to Warwick: not only due to the fact that his plans had been sabotaged, but also the secrecy with which the king had acted. The marriage—contracted on 1 May of the same year—was not made public before Warwick pressed Edward on the issue at a council meeting, and in the meanwhile, Warwick had been unknowingly deceiving the French into believing the king was serious about the marriage proposal. For Edward the marriage may very well have been a love match, but in the long run, he sought to build the Woodville family into a powerhouse independent of Warwick's influence. The marriage of Edward IV and Elizabeth Woodville caused Warwick to lose his power and influence. He accused Elizabeth, and her mother Jacquetta of Luxembourg, of witchcraft to try to restore the power that he had lost.

This was not enough to cause a complete fallout between the two men, though from this point on Warwick increasingly stayed away from court. The promotion of Warwick's brother George to Archbishop of York shows that the earl was still in favour with the king. In July 1465, when Henry VI was once more captured, it was Warwick who escorted the fallen king to his captivity in the Tower.

Then, in the spring of 1466, Warwick was sent to the continent to carry out negotiations with the French and Burgundians. The negotiations centred around a marriage proposal involving Edward's sister Margaret. Warwick increasingly came to favour French diplomatic connections. Meanwhile, Edward's father-in-law, Richard Woodville, Earl Rivers, who had been created treasurer, was in favour of a Burgundian alliance. This set up an internal conflict within the English court, which was not alleviated by the fact that Edward had signed a secret treaty in October with Burgundy, while Warwick was forced to carry on sham negotiations with the French. Later, George Neville was dismissed as chancellor, while Edward refused to contemplate a marriage between Warwick's oldest daughter Isabel, and Edward's brother George, Duke of Clarence. It became increasingly clear that Warwick's position of dominance at court had been taken over by Rivers.

In the autumn of 1467, there were rumours that Warwick was now sympathetic to the Lancastrian cause, but even though he refused to come to court to answer the charges, the king accepted his denial in writing. In July 1468, it was revealed that Warwick's deputy in Calais, John, Lord Wenlock, was involved in a Lancastrian conspiracy, and early in 1469 another Lancastrian plot was uncovered, involving John de Vere, Earl of Oxford. It was becoming clear that the discontent with Edward's reign was widespread, a fact that Warwick could exploit.

== Defection ==
=== Rebellion ===
Warwick now orchestrated a rebellion in Yorkshire while he was away, led by a "Robin of Redesdale". Part of Warwick's plan was winning over King Edward's younger brother, George Plantagenet, possibly with the prospect of installing him on the throne. The nineteen-year-old George had shown himself to share many of the abilities of his older brother but was also jealous and overambitious.

In July 1469, the two sailed over to Calais, where George was married to Warwick's daughter, Lady Isabel Neville. From there, they returned to England, where they gathered the men of Kent to join the rebellion in the north. Meanwhile, the king's forces were defeated at the Battle of Edgecote, where William Herbert, Earl of Pembroke, was killed. The other commander, Humphrey Stafford, Earl of Devon, was caught in flight and lynched by a mob. Later, Earl Rivers and his son, John Woodville, were also apprehended and murdered. With his army now defeated, King Edward IV was taken under arrest by George Neville. Warwick then imprisoned the king in Warwick Castle, and in August, the king was taken north to Middleham Castle. In the long run, however, it proved impossible to rule without the king, and continuing disorder forced Warwick to release King Edward IV in September 1469.

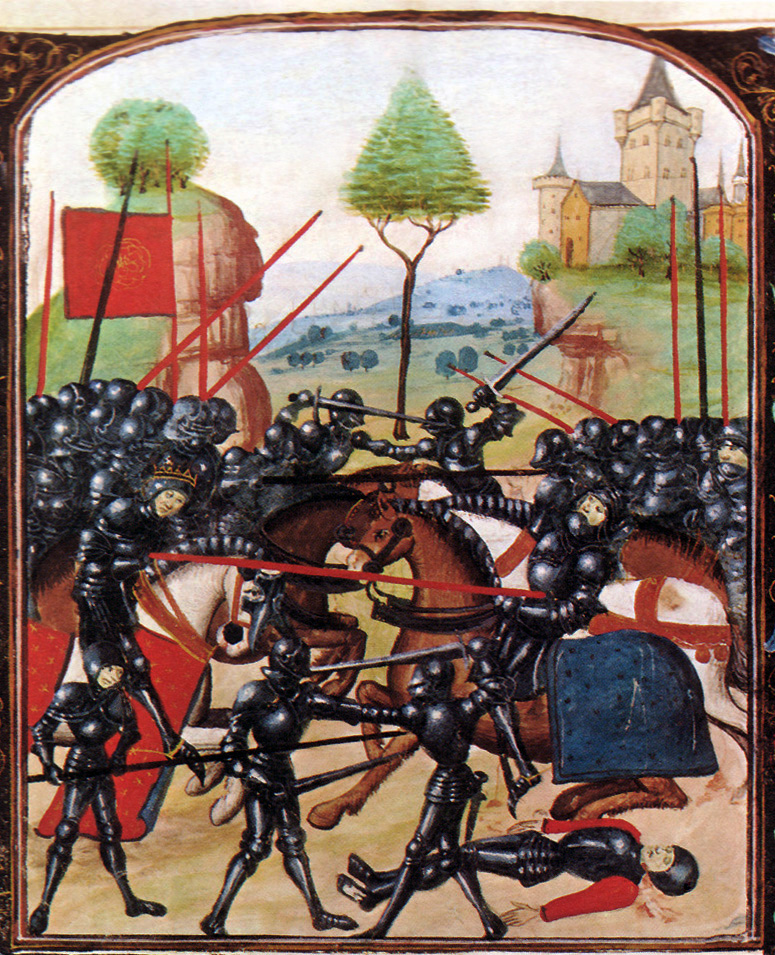
The Battle of Barnet, where Warwick was killed. Edward IV can be seen on the left, wearing a crown, and Warwick on the right being pierced by a lance. In reality, Edward did not kill Warwick.

A modus vivendi had been achieved between Warwick and the king for some months, but the restoration of Henry Percy to Montagu's earldom of Northumberland prevented any chance of full reconciliation. A trap was set for the king when disturbances in Lincolnshire led him north, where he could be confronted by Warwick's men. Edward, however, discovered the plot when Robert, Lord Welles, was routed at Losecote Field in Rutland in March 1470, and gave away the plan.

Warwick soon gave up, and once more fled the country with Clarence. Denied access to Calais, they sought refuge with King Louis XI of France. Louis arranged a reconciliation between Warwick and Margaret of Anjou, and as part of the agreement, Margaret and Henry's son, Edward, Prince of Wales, would marry Warwick's daughter Anne. The objective of the alliance was to restore Henry VI to the throne. Again, Warwick staged an uprising in the north, and with the king away, he and Clarence landed at Dartmouth and Plymouth on 13 September 1470.

Among the many who flocked to Warwick's side was his brother Montagu, who had not taken part in the last rebellion, but was disappointed when his loyalty to the king had not been rewarded with the restoration of his earldom. This time the trap set up for the king worked; as Edward hurried south, Montagu's forces approached from the north, and the king found himself surrounded. On 2 October he fled to Flanders, a part of the Duchy of Burgundy. King Henry was now restored, with Warwick acting as the true ruler in his capacity as lieutenant. At a parliament in November, Edward was attainted of his lands and titles, and Clarence was awarded the Duchy of York.

=== Death ===
At this point, international affairs intervened. Louis XI declared war on Burgundy, and Charles the Bold responded by granting an expeditionary force to Edward IV, in order to reclaim his throne. On 14 March 1471, Edward landed at Ravenspurn in Yorkshire, with the acquiescence of the Earl of Northumberland. Warwick was still waiting for Queen Margaret and her son Edward, who were supposed to bring reinforcements from France but were kept on the continent by bad weather. At this point, Edward received the support of his brother Clarence, who realised that he had been disadvantaged by the new agreement with the Lancastrians. Clarence's defection weakened Warwick, who nevertheless went in pursuit of Edward. On 14 April 1471 the two armies met at Barnet. Fog and poor visibility on the field led to confusion, and the Lancastrian army ended up attacking its own men. In the face of defeat Warwick attempted to escape the field but was struck off his horse and killed.

== Aftermath ==
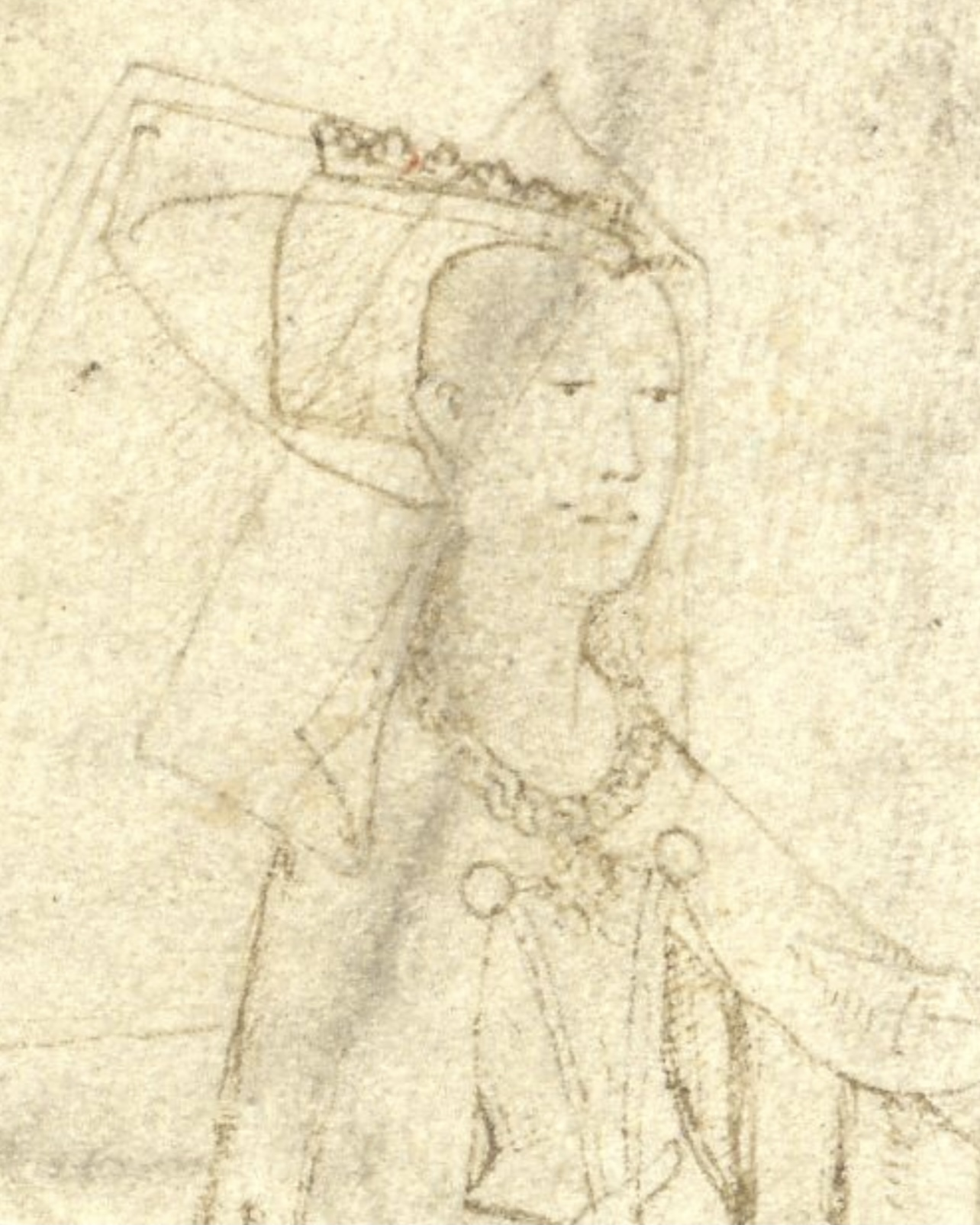
Isabel Neville

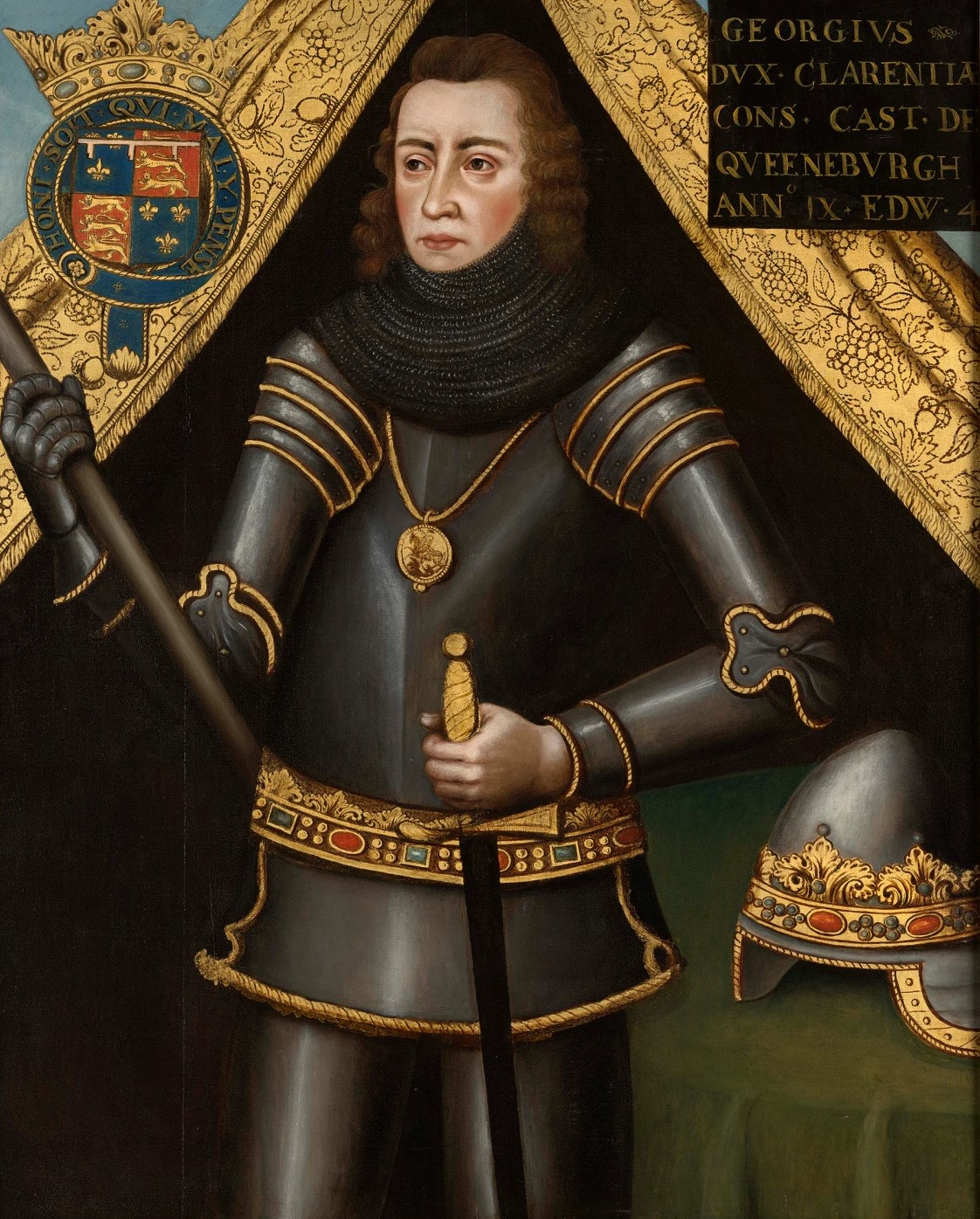
George Plantagenet, Duke of Clarence

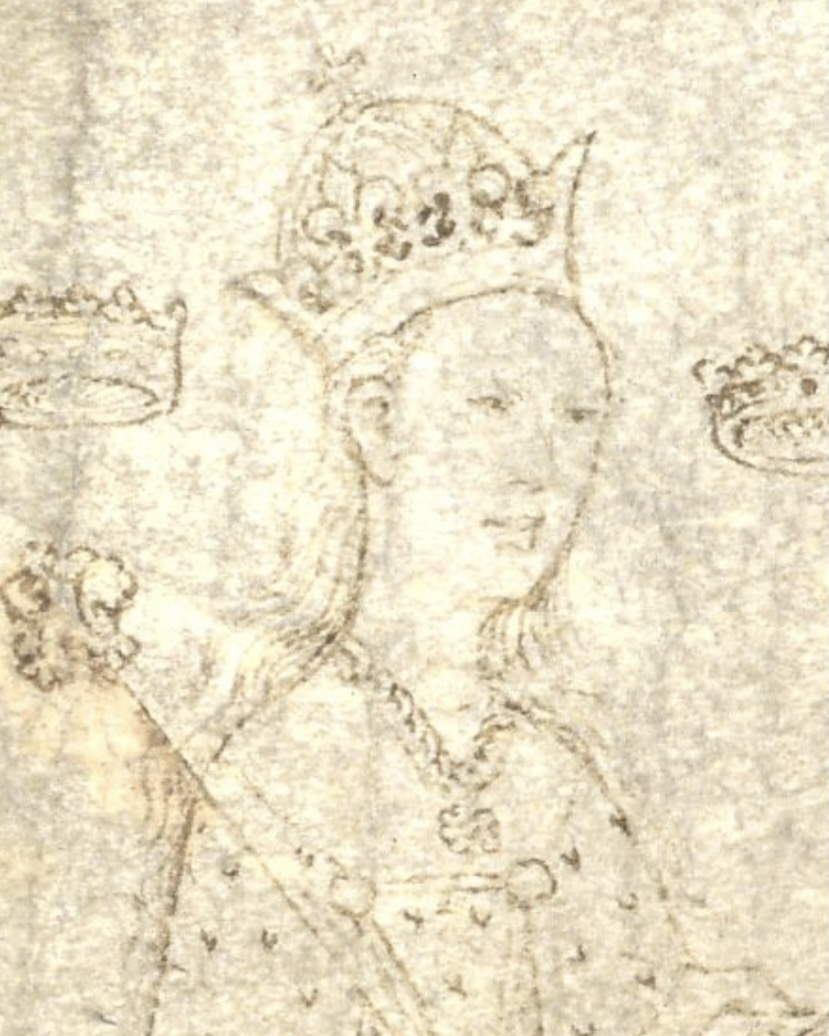
Anne Neville

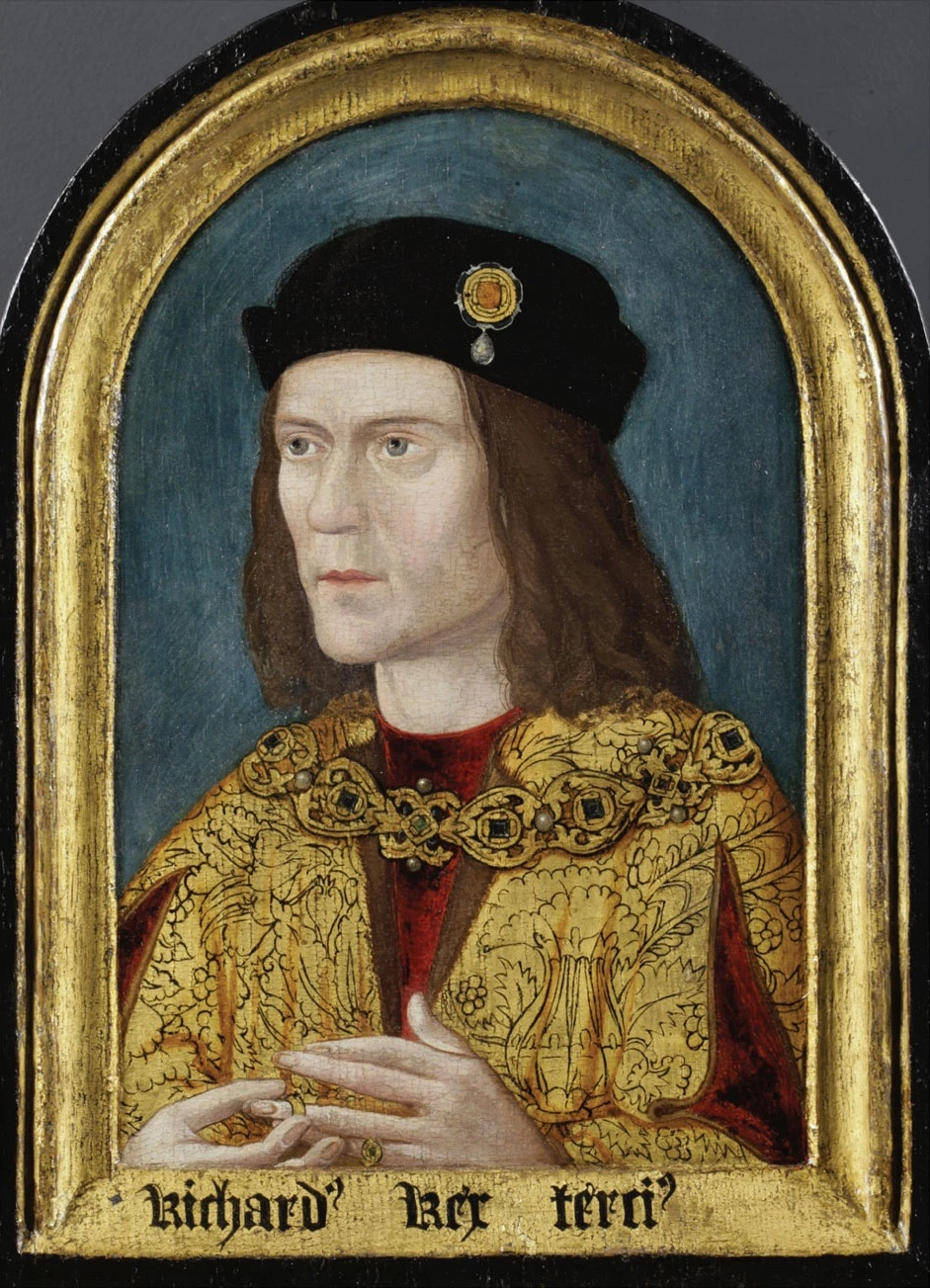
Richard Plantagenet, Duke of Gloucester, later King Richard III

Warwick's body—along with that of his brother Montagu, who had also fallen at Barnet—was displayed in London's St Paul's Cathedral to quell any rumours of their survival. Then they were handed over to Archbishop Neville, to be buried in the family vault at Bisham Priory near the river Thames in Berkshire. No trace now remains of either the tomb or the church in which it was housed. On 4 May 1471, Edward IV defeated the remaining Lancastrian forces of Queen Margaret and Prince Edward at the Battle of Tewkesbury, where the prince was killed. Soon afterwards, it was reported that King Henry VI had also died in the Tower. With the direct Lancastrian line exterminated, Edward could reign safely until his death in 1483.

Warwick had no sons. His offices were divided between King Edward's brothers George, Duke of Clarence (who had married Warwick's older daughter Isabel Neville), and Richard, Duke of Gloucester, the future Richard III (who would marry Warwick's younger daughter Anne Neville). Clarence received the chamberlainship of England and the lieutenancy of Ireland, while Gloucester was made Admiral of England and Warden of the West March. Clarence also received the earldoms of Warwick and Salisbury. The earl's land had been forfeited and taken into the king's custody. When Gloucester married Warwick's younger daughter Anne in 1472, who had been recently widowed by the death of Prince Edward, a dispute broke out between the two princes over the Beauchamp and Despenser inheritances. A compromise was eventually reached, whereby the land was divided, but Clarence was not pacified. In 1477 he once again plotted against his brother. This time the king could no longer act with lenience, and the next year the Duke of Clarence was executed.

== Legacy ==
=== Assessment ===
"Thou setter-up and plucker-down of kings"

— William Shakespeare; Henry VI

Early sources on Richard Neville fall into two categories. The first are the sympathetic chronicles of the early Yorkist years, or works based on these, such as the Mirror for Magistrates (1559). The other category originates with chronicles commissioned by Edward IV after Warwick's fall, such as the Historie of the arrivall of Edward IV, and take a more negative view of the earl. The Mirror portrayed Warwick as a great man: beloved by the people, and betrayed by the man he helped raise to the throne. The other perspective can be found in Shakespeare's Henry VI trilogy: a man driven by pride and egotism, who created and deposed kings at will.

In time, however, it is the latter view that dominated. The Enlightenment, or Whig historians of the eighteenth and nineteenth centuries, decried anyone who impeded the development towards a centralised, constitutional monarchy, the way Warwick did in his struggles with Edward. David Hume called Warwick "the greatest, as well as the last, of those mighty barons who formerly overawed the crown, and rendered the people incapable of any regular system of civil government." Later writers were split between admiration for some of Warwick's character traits, and condemnation of his political actions. The romantic novelist Lord Lytton picked up on Hume's theme in his The Last of the Barons. Though Lytton portrayed Warwick as a tragic hero who embodied the ideals of chivalry, he was nevertheless one whose time was past. The late-nineteenth-century military historian Charles Oman acknowledged the earl's ability to appeal to popular sentiments, yet pointed out his deficiencies as a military commander. Oman found Warwick a traditional strategist, "not attaining the heights of military genius displayed by his pupil Edward." Paul Murray Kendall's popular biography from 1957 took a sympathetic view of Warwick but concluded that he had ultimately fallen victim to his own overreaching ambition.

More recent historians, such as Michael Hicks and A. J. Pollard, have tried to see Warwick in light of the standards of his own age, rather than holding him up to contemporary constitutional ideals. The insults Warwick suffered at the hands of King Edward—including Edward's secret marriage, and the refusal of the French diplomatic channel—were significant. His claim to prominence in national affairs was not a product of illusions of grandeur; it was confirmed by the high standing he enjoyed among the princes on the continent. Furthermore, Warwick's cause was not considered unjust by his contemporaries, which can be seen by the earl's popularity exceeding that of the king at the time of his first rebellion in 1469. On the other hand, while Warwick could not easily suffer his treatment by the king, it was equally impossible for Edward to accept the earl's presence on the political scene. As long as Warwick remained as powerful and influential as he was, Edward could not fully assert his royal authority, and eventual confrontation became inevitable.

However, the memories written in Burgundy had a negative view of him. For example, according to Philippe de Commynes and Olivier de la Marche, Georges Chastellain, who all mention Edward's popularity and character, Warwick was sage and cunning, and much richer than Edward, but he was very hated. In addition, unlike his brother John Nevill and Edward, he was not brave. A Burgundy historian Jean de Wavrin criticized him more bitterly than other Burgundians.

=== Fictional depictions of the Earl of Warwick ===
==== Performing arts ====
- Henry VI, Part 2 and Henry VI, Part 3 by William Shakespeare

==== Prose fiction ====
- Harry Turtledove, Opening Atlantis (2007)
- Philippa Gregory:
  - The White Queen (2009), Book 1 in the Cousins' War series, about Elizabeth Woodville
  - The Kingmaker's Daughter (2012), Book 4 in the Cousins' War series, about Anne Neville
- Sharon Kay Penman, The Sunne in Splendour (1982)

=== Screen portrayals ===
==== Television ====
- The White Queen (2013): Warwick was portrayed by James Frain.
- Britain's Bloody Crown (2015): Warwick was portrayed by James Oliver Wheatley
- The Hollow Crown, Henry VI Part 1 and Henry VI Part 2 (2016): Warwick was played by Stanley Townsend.

== Coat of arms ==
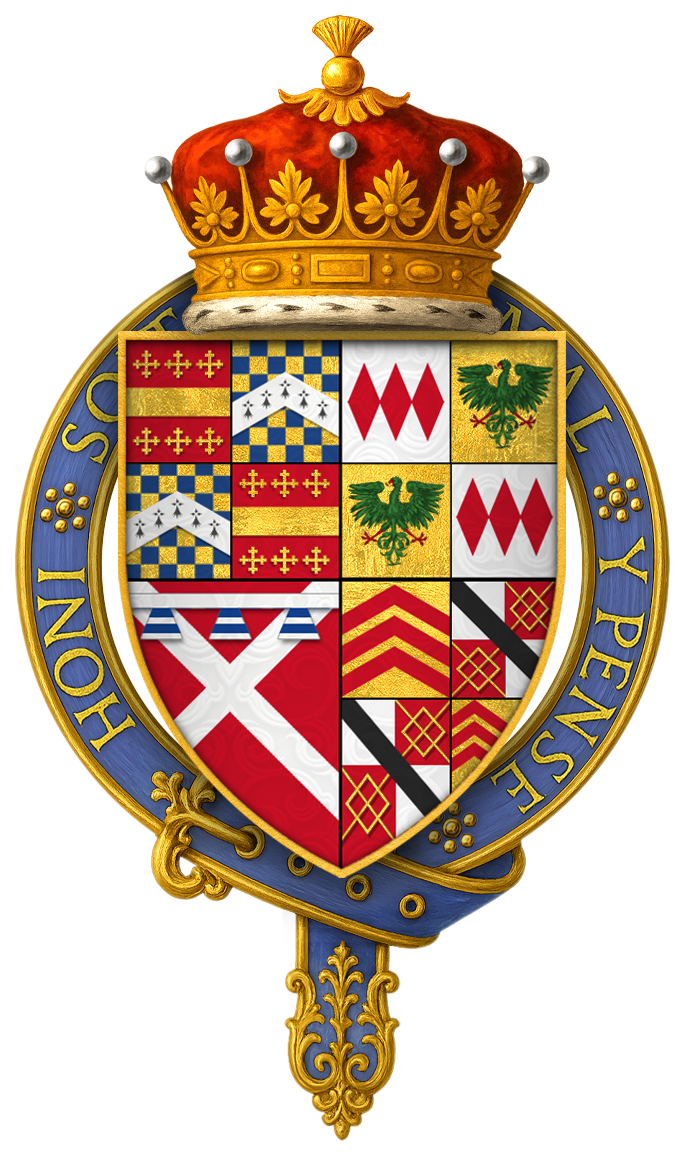
Warwick's coat of arms as Knight of the Garter

Heraldic shield

The Earl of Warwick's coat of arms was unusually complex for the period, with seven different quarterings in an unusual order. The first grand quarter consists of the arms of his father-in-law, Richard de Beauchamp, 13th Earl of Warwick, who bore his arms quartering Despenser (the arms of his wife Isabel le Despenser) with an inescutcheon of De Clare, which Warwick showed in the fourth quarter. The second grand quarter showed the arms of Montagu (quartering Monthermer). The third grand quarter showed the arms of Neville differenced – rather honourably augmented – by a label compony argent and azure for Beaufort (House of Lancaster) to signify the royal descent from Warwick's father Richard Neville, 5th Earl of Salisbury, who was the eldest son and heir of Ralph Neville, 1st Earl of Westmorland and his wife, Lady Joan Beaufort, daughter of John of Gaunt, 1st Duke of Lancaster, third son of King Edward III and great-grandfather of the last Lancastrian King Henry VI.

== Neville family tree ==
The chart below shows, in abbreviated form, the family background of Richard Neville and his family connections with the houses of York and Lancaster. Anne Neville is shown with her two husbands, in order from right to left.

John of Gaunt, 1st Duke of Lancaster (1340–1399)
Ralph Neville, 1st Earl of Westmorland (c. 1364–1425)	Joan Beaufort (c. 1379–1440)	King Henry IV (1367–1413)
Richard de Beauchamp, 13th Earl of Warwick (1382–1439)	Alice Montacute, 5th Countess of Salisbury (c. 1406–1462)	Richard Neville, 5th Earl of Salisbury (1400–1460)	Cecily Neville (1415–1495)	Richard Plantagenet, 3rd Duke of York (1411–1460)	King Henry V (1386–1422)
Anne Beauchamp, 16th Countess of Warwick (1426–1492)	Richard Neville, 16th Earl of Warwick (1428–1471)	John Neville, 1st Marquess of Montagu (c. 1431–1471)	Archbishop; George Neville (1432–1476)	King Henry VI (1421–1471)
King Edward IV (1442–1483)	Isabel Neville (1451–1476)	George, Duke of Clarence (1449–1478)	(2.) King Richard III (1452–1485)	Anne Neville (1456–1485)	(1.) Edward, Prince of Wales (1453–1471)

== Ancestry ==
Ancestors of Richard Neville, 16th Earl of Warwick

16. Ralph Neville, 2nd Baron Neville de Raby
8. John Neville, 3rd Baron Neville
17. Alice Audley
4. Ralph de Neville, 1st Earl of Westmorland
18. Henry de Percy, 2nd Baron Percy
9. Maud Percy
19. Idoine de Clifford
2. Richard Neville, 5th Earl of Salisbury
20. Edward III, King of England
10. John of Gaunt, 1st Duke of Lancaster
21. Philippa of Hainault
5. Joan Beaufort
22. Sir Paon de Roet
11. Katherine Swynford
1. Richard Neville, 16th Earl of Warwick
24. Sir John de Montacute, 1st Baron Montacute
12. John Montacute, 3rd Earl of Salisbury
25. Margaret de Monthermer
6. Thomas Montacute, 4th Earl of Salisbury
26. Sir Adam Francis
13. Maud Francis
27. Alice Champneis
3. Alice Montacute, 5th Countess of Salisbury
28. Thomas Holland, 1st Earl of Kent
14. Thomas Holland, 2nd Earl of Kent
29. Joan, Princess of Wales, 4th Countess of Kent
7. Lady Eleanor Holland
30. Richard Fitzalan, 10th Earl of Arundel
15. Lady Alice FitzAlan
31. Eleanor of Lancaster

== See also ==
- Percy–Neville feud
- Kingmaker board game

== Notes ==
Honorary titles
Preceded by Richard Woodville, 1st Earl Rivers	Lord Warden of the Cinque Ports; 1460–1471	Succeeded by John Scott
Political offices
Preceded by Richard of York, 3rd Duke of York	Captain of Calais; 1455–1458	Succeeded by Henry Beaufort, 3rd Duke of Somerset
Preceded by Henry Beaufort, 3rd Duke of Somerset	Captain of Calais; 1461–1471	Succeeded by Anthony Woodville, 2nd Earl Rivers
Preceded by Henry Holland, 3rd Duke of Exeter	Lord High Admiral; 1461–1462	Succeeded by William Neville, 1st Earl of Kent
Preceded by Richard, Duke of Gloucester	Lord High Admiral; 1470–1471	Succeeded by Richard, Duke of Gloucester
Peerage of England
Preceded by Anne Beauchamp, 15th Countess of Warwick	16th Earl of Warwick (jure uxoris by Anne Neville); 1449–1471	Succeeded by Edward Plantagenet, 17th Earl of Warwick
Preceded by Alice Montacute, 5th Countess of Salisbury	6th Earl of Salisbury; 1462–1471	Extinct
