= The Women of the Cousins' War =

- First UK edition cover
- Author: Philippa Gregory; David Baldwin; Michael K Jones
- Audio read by: Bianca Amato
- Language: English
- Genre: Biography
- Publisher: Simon & Schuster
- Publication date: 13 September 2011
- Publication place: United Kingdom
- Media type: Print (Hardcover)
- Pages: 352
- ISBN: 978-0857201775

The Women of the Cousins' War: The Duchess, the Queen and the King's Mother is a 2011 book by historical novelist Philippa Gregory and historians David Baldwin and Michael K. Jones. It is a non-fiction work that explores the lives of three prominent women of the historical Wars of the Roses, all of whom Gregory has featured in her Cousins' War series of novels.

== Contents ==
The book consists of an introduction by Gregory and three biographical essays: the first is about Jacquetta of Luxembourg, written by Gregory; the second is about Jacquetta's daughter Elizabeth Woodville, queen consort of Edward IV of England, written by Baldwin; and the third is about Margaret Beaufort, mother of Henry VII of England, written by Jones. These coincide with three of Gregory's Cousins' War novels, The Lady of the Rivers (2011), The White Queen (2009) and The Red Queen (2010), respectively. The book also contains illustrations, family trees, maps and timelines. Each woman is affiliated to a belligerent house: Jacquetta to the Lancasters, Elizabeth to the Yorks and Margaret to the Tudors.

== Critical reception ==
Publishers Weekly called The Women of the Cousins' War "an engrossing introduction to three courageous matriarchs who shaped English history," but also noted that it is "often repetitious and lacks a consistent voice and cohesive overview on the origins of the Wars of the Roses."

AudioFile magazine, reviewing the audiobook recording of the book, called Gregory's essay on Jacquetta of Luxembourg "fascinating" and Baldwin's piece on Elizabeth Woodville "equally informative, but less colorful." The review also praised the narrator, noting that "Bianca Amato's rich tones turn this book’s three essays into the best kind of nonfiction listening: engaging, informative, and entertaining."
