= The White Princess =

Book by Philippa Gregory

- First UK edition cover
- Author: Philippa Gregory
- Audio read by: Bianca Amato
- Language: English
- Series: The Cousins' War
- Genre: Historical fiction
- Publisher: Simon & Schuster
- Publication date: 1 August 2013
- Publication place: United Kingdom
- Media type: Print (hardcover/paperback); Audiobook; E-book
- Pages: 544
- ISBN: 978-0-85720-751-7
- Preceded by: The Kingmaker's Daughter
- Followed by: The King's Curse

The White Princess is a 2013 historical novel by Philippa Gregory, part of her series The Cousins' War. It is the story of Elizabeth of York, daughter of Edward IV of England and Elizabeth Woodville, and later wife of Henry VII and mother of Henry VIII.

In October 2013, The Telegraph reported that Starz was planning to develop a miniseries based on The White Princess. This adaptation would be a sequel to The White Queen, a 10-part 2013 television series which adapted Gregory's novels The White Queen (2009), The Red Queen (2010) and The Kingmaker's Daughter (2012). Production on the eight episode limited series began in June 2016.

== Plot ==
Richard III has been killed in the Battle of Bosworth, and his devastated niece and lover Elizabeth of York must marry Richard's conqueror Henry Tudor, the new king of England, to finally end the longrunning Wars of the Roses between the houses of Lancaster and York. As queen, Elizabeth can assure the safety of her mother, the Queen Dowager Elizabeth, and the rest of her family. However, she believes that Henry—who openly despises her for her former alliance with his fallen enemy—may be responsible for the presumed murder of her brother Edward, the former heir. As suggested by his mother, the imperious Margaret Stanley, Henry insists that Elizabeth get pregnant by him before he commits himself to marry her. She does, and they wed. Elizabeth bears him a son, Arthur, but Henry's rule remains less than secure. He imprisons young Edward (called "Teddy"), the son of George, Duke of Clarence and a potential York claimant to the throne, in the Tower of London as public support for the fallen Yorks seems to surge. Henry discovers that Elizabeth's mother has been secretly rallying and financing York supporters in exile, and sends her to Bermondsey Abbey. Elizabeth is torn between her mother's Yorkist cause and her own loyalty to Henry and their son, and is tortured by a secret. Though the Dowager Queen has purposely kept her daughter in the dark about her plots, Elizabeth knows that her mother had sent her younger brother Richard to safety in Flanders, while an impostor went missing and was presumably murdered in the Tower.

Elizabeth and Henry have a daughter, Margaret and a son, Henry. Elizabeth's mother dies. Rebellion builds as a boy claiming to be the lost Richard appears and is acknowledged by Margaret, Duchess of Burgundy, the sister of Elizabeth's father, Edward IV. His claim is embraced by James IV of Scotland and other monarchs, and lords supposedly loyal to Henry begin to escape to Scotland. With the forces against him growing and his support waning, a volatile Henry grows increasingly mistrustful of Elizabeth and her extended family. Despite the odds, Henry is ultimately triumphant and takes the pretender Richard prisoner. The charismatic young man renounces his claims and is welcomed at the English court as Perkin Warbeck, kept unharmed until Henry can determine how best to deal with him. Warbeck is clearly the presumed dead York heir, but Elizabeth dare not acknowledge him. Meanwhile, Henry has fallen in love with Warbeck's wife Katherine Huntly, who indulges the king's attentions to keep her husband alive. On his own merits, Warbeck begins to gain allies and influence at court, so when an assassination attempt on Warbeck fails, Henry first imprisons him in the Tower with Teddy, and then arranges for them both to be caught trying to escape. Charged as traitors, Warbeck and Teddy are executed.

== Critical reception ==
In 2013, Helen Brown of The Telegraph wrote that "with The White Princess, [Gregory] makes a psychologically involving page-turner of the reign that Shakespeare skipped." Of Elizabeth Woodville and Margaret Beaufort, the title characters of Gregory's The White Queen (2009) and The Red Queen (2010) respectively, Brown wrote, "it’s good to have them back." She also praised the novel's support of the controversial theory that Elizabeth of York's brother Richard survived his imprisonment in the Tower of London. Publishers Weekly noted, "Gregory believably depicts this mostly forgotten queen, her moody husband, and the future Henry VIII, shown here as a charmingly temperamental child. Something about the Tudors brings out the best in Gregory’s portraiture."

AudioFile magazine gave its Earphones Award to the audiobook recording of The White Princess, calling the novel "thrilling" and "richly imagined" and noting that "Philippa Gregory and [narrator] Bianca Amato have another winner."

== Adaptation ==
The 10-part 2013 television series The White Queen adapted Gregory's previous novels The White Queen (2009), The Red Queen (2010) and The Kingmaker's Daughter (2012). The series was broadcast on BBC One in the United Kingdom and on Starz in the United States, and features Freya Mavor as a young Elizabeth of York. Despite initial plans for a second series, on 20 August 2013 the BBC announced they were not commissioning one, possibly due to the lukewarm reception the series received.

However, in October 2013, The Telegraph reported that Starz was planning to develop a sequel miniseries called The White Princess, based on Gregory's novel. Starz CEO Chris Albrecht announced in January 2014 that the network was working with White Queen screenwriter Emma Frost on the project. Starz would produce the White Princess miniseries without involvement from the BBC. Gregory confirmed that the project was underway in August 2015. On 7 February 2016, Gregory announced on Facebook that the sequel was officially confirmed to be in production, with the scripts being written. Production on the eight episode limited series began in June 2016.
