= Bianca Amato =

South African actress

- Born: Cape Town, South Africa
- Education: University of Cape Town
- Occupation: Actress
- Years active: 1998–present
- Spouse: Neil Kuny
- Children: 1

Bianca Amato is a South African actress known for her work in American theatre, as a prolific audiobook performer and for her portrayal of Philippa De Villiers in the original cast of the South African soap opera Isidingo.

== Career ==
Amato was a member of the original cast of the long running South African soap opera Isidingo, portraying Philippa De Villiers from 1998 to 2001. The character's relationship with mine manager Derek Nyathi (Hlomla Dandala) featured the first interracial kiss, and was the first interracial romance, to be depicted on South African television. The storyline has been described as "groundbreaking and big news in post apartheid South African television". Of the experience Amato said, "It was wonderful to be part of the slow but healthy process that shifted people's attitudes." Her performance in Isidingo earned Amato an Avante for Best Actress in a Television Series.

In 2002, Amato was granted a United States Permanent Resident Card as an "Alien of Extraordinary Ability" in the arts and emigrated to the United States. After appearing in a 2002 episode of the HBO series Sex and the City, she played several leading roles with the Guthrie Theater in Minneapolis, Minnesota between 2003 and 2005. Since 2009 Amato has guest starred in several U.S. TV series. In 2015, Amato portrayed Delia Alexander in the 2015 PlayStation Network series Powers.

Amato appeared in the original Broadway production of Tom Stoppard's Tony Award-winning trio of plays The Coast of Utopia (2006–07), as well as the 2013–14 Broadway revival of Shakespeare's Macbeth. She also understudied the roles of Hannah Jarvis and Lady Croom in the 2011 Broadway revival of Stoppard's Arcadia. Off-Broadway, Amato has appeared in Bill Irwin's Mr. Fox: A Rumination (2004), and as Emma in Trumpery (2007). She later costarred as Calantha in The Broken Heart in 2012, and played the leading role of Olga Knipper in Neva in 2013. Amato also starred as Amanda in a production of Noël Coward's Private Lives directed by Maria Aitken, first presented in 2012 at the Huntington Theatre Company in Boston, and again in 2014 at the Shakespeare Theatre Company's Lansburgh Theatre in Washington, D. C. In 2014 she also portrayed Regan in the Theatre for a New Audience production of King Lear in New York.

Amato has narrated over 40 audiobooks, including most of the historical novels in the Cousins' War series written by Philippa Gregory, and Charles Stross' 2008 science fiction novel Saturn's Children. She also voiced the 2006 gothic novel The Thirteenth Tale by Diane Setterfield, which had risen to No. 1 on The New York Times Best Seller list in its second week of publication.

=== Television ===
Year	Project	Role	Notes	Ref.
1996	The Adventures of Sinbad	Casendra	Episode: "The Village Vanishes" (season 1)	
1997	The Adventures of Sinbad	Shirez	Episode: "Ali Rashid and the Thieves" (season 2)	
1998–2001	Isidingo	Philippa De Villiers	Original cast	
1999	Gegen den Wind	Jenny	Episode: "Sprung ins Risiko" (season 4)	
2002	Sex and the City	Julia Afton	Episode: "Critical Condition" (season 5)	
2009	The Good Wife	Ellen Whitton	Episode: "Unprepared" (season 1)	
2010	Blue Bloods	Cindy Perry	Episode: "Re-Do" (season 1)	
2013	The Big C	Susan Rand	(3) Episodes: "You Can't Take It with You", "Quality of Death", "The Finale" (season 4)	
2013	Unforgettable	Alison Sonnenland	Episode: "Bigtime" (season 2)	
2014	Alpha House	Senator Alice Graves	(2) Episodes: "The Civility Zone", "Bugged" (season 2)	
2015	Powers	Delia Alexander	(5) Episodes	
2016	Elementary	Elizabeth Resor	Episode: "Folie à Deux" (season 5)	
2018–2020	The River	Julia Hargreaves	Recurring	
2019	Warrior	Nancy	Episode: "The Blood and the Sh*t" (season 1)	
2019	Our Girl	Ursula Tait	Episode #4.12 (season 4)	
2022–2024	Binnelanders	Ewa Wozniak / Andrea Hayden		
2023	Classified	Marsha Brock	(4) episodes	

=== Film ===
Year	Project	Role	Ref.
2020	The Kissing Booth 3	Linda	
2026	How to Make a Killing	Cassandra Longfellow	

=== Theatre ===
Year	Production	Role	Notes	Ref.
2003	Top Girls	Marlene	Guthrie Theater, Minneapolis, MN	
2003	Pride and Prejudice	Elizabeth Bennet	Guthrie Theater, Minneapolis, MN	
2004	Pygmalion	Eliza Doolittle	Guthrie Theater, Minneapolis, MN	
2004	Mr. Fox: A Rumination	Columbine/Mattie/Young Woman/Maffitt	Signature Theatre Company (Peter Norton Space, Off-Broadway)	
2005	As You Like It	Rosalind	Guthrie Theater, Minneapolis, MN	
2006	The Importance of Being Earnest	Gwendolen Fairfax	Brooklyn Academy of Music (BAM Harvey Theater, Brooklyn, NY)	
2006–07	The Coast of Utopia (Part 1: Voyage)	Miss Chamberlain	Vivian Beaumont Theater (Broadway)	
2006–07	The Coast of Utopia (Part 2: Shipwreck)	Emma Herwegh	Vivian Beaumont Theater (Broadway)	
2007	The Coast of Utopia (Part 3: Salvage)	Joanna Kinkel	Vivian Beaumont Theater (Broadway)	
2007	Trumpery	Emma	Atlantic Theater Company (Linda Gross Theater, Off-Broadway)	
2010	A Midsummer Night's Dream	Titania/Hippolyta	Pittsburgh Public Theater (O'Reilly Theater, Pittsburgh, PA)	
2010	The Taming of the Shrew	Katharina	Chicago Shakespeare Theater (Courtyard Theater, Chicago, IL)	
2012	The Broken Heart	Calantha	Theatre for a New Audience (The Duke on 42nd Street, Off-Broadway)	
2012	Private Lives	Amanda	Huntington Theatre Company (Boston, MA); Elliot Norton Award; IRNE Award nomination	
2013	Neva	Olga Knipper	Joseph Papp Public Theater (Anspacher Theater, Off-Broadway)	
2013–14	Macbeth	Lady Macduff	Vivian Beaumont Theater (Broadway)	
2014	King Lear	Regan	Theatre for a New Audience (Polonsky Shakespeare Center, Brooklyn, NY)	
2014	Private Lives	Amanda	Shakespeare Theatre Company (Lansburgh Theatre, Washington, D. C.); Emery Battis Award	
2014	Shakespeare at Fenway	Beatrice/Much Ado About Nothing	Commonwealth Shakespeare Company (Fenway Park, Boston, MA)	
2016	Stupid Fucking Bird	Emma Arkadina (The Seagull)	Pearl Theatre, Manhattan	

=== Audiobooks ===
Year	Title	Author	Notes	Ref.
2004	The Queen's Fool	Philippa Gregory	Novel originally printed in 2003	
2006	Listening for Lions	Gloria Whelan	AudioFile Earphones Award, Audie Award; Novel originally printed in 2005	
2006	The Boleyn Inheritance	Philippa Gregory	Abridged (2006) and unabridged (2011) versions	
2006	Swan Town	Michael Ortiz		
2007	The Thirteenth Tale	Diane Setterfield	Novel originally printed in 2006	
2007	Dragon's Keep	Janet Lee Carey		
2007	A Dangerous Beauty	Sophia Nash		
2008	The Other Queen	Philippa Gregory	Abridged version	
2008	Sovay	Celia Rees		
2009	Saturn's Children	Charles Stross	Novel originally printed in 2008	
2009	The White Queen	Philippa Gregory	Abridged version	
2009	Her Fearful Symmetry	Audrey Niffenegger		
2009	The Secret Diaries of Charlotte Brontë	Syrie James	AudioFile Earphones Award, Audie Award	
2010	The Red Queen	Philippa Gregory	AudioFile Earphones Award	
2010	Dracula in Love	Karen Essex	AudioFile Earphones Award	
2011	The Lady of the Rivers	Philippa Gregory	AudioFile Earphones Award	
2011	Death in the Floating City	Tasha Alexander		
2011	The Women of the Cousins' War	Philippa Gregory; David Baldwin; Michael Jones	Non-fiction	
2011	Cocktail Hour Under the Tree of Forgetfulness	Alexandra Fuller		
2011	Steamed	Katie MacAlister		
2011	Cartwheeling in Thunderstorms	Katherine Rundell		
2012	The Kingmaker's Daughter	Philippa Gregory	AudioFile Earphones Award	
2012	Changeling	Philippa Gregory		
2013	The White Princess	Philippa Gregory	AudioFile Earphones Award	
2013	Behind the Shattered Glass	Tasha Alexander		
2014	The King's Curse	Philippa Gregory	AudioFile Earphones Award	
2014	The Counterfeit Heiress	Tasha Alexander		
2014	Midnight Thief	Livia Blackburne		
2015	The Taming of the Queen	Philippa Gregory	AudioFile Earphones Award	
2015	A School for Brides	Patrice Kindl		
2016	Three Sisters, Three Queens	Philippa Gregory		
2017	The Last Tudor	Philippa Gregory	AudioFile Earphones Award	
2017	Death in St. Petersburg	Tasha Alexander		
2018	Uneasy Lies the Crown	Tasha Alexander		
2019	In the Shadow of Vesuvius	Tasha Alexander		
2020	Afterland	Lauren Beukes		
2020	A Pinch of Magic	Michelle Harrison		
2021	The Joy and Light Bus Company	Alexander McCall Smith	The No. 1 Ladies' Detective Agency #22	
2024	The Great Hippopotamus Hotel	Alexander McCall Smith	The No. 1 Ladies' Detective Agency #25	
2025	In the Time of Five Pumpkins	Alexander McCall Smith	The No. 1 Ladies' Detective Agency #26	

=== Acclaim ===
Charles Isherwood of The New York Times wrote in his review of 2012's The Broken Heart that "Amato exudes imperial grandeur as Calantha", and Andy Propst of TheaterMania noted that "audiences will also find themselves intrigued by Amato's warmly imperious turn as the Spartan princess." In 2013 Isherwood called the cast of Neva "terrifically good", noting Amato to be "captivating from the opening moments" and writing that she "manages to make Olga's self-dramatizing histrionics absurdly funny, but also tinged with real pathos." In 2012 The Boston Globe called Amato and her costar James Waterston "just about perfect" in their roles as Amanda and Elyot in Private Lives, praising their "style, dexterity, subtlety, and sizzling chemistry." The review went on to say that "Amato cuts a regal, soignée figure — she can wring a laugh out of a single word, like 'inveterate' — but she is also skilled at physical comedy." BroadwayWorld.com called Amato and Waterston "an unparalleled pair" in 2014, adding that "Amato is both grit and glamour, portraying a character that is brusque for her time, but immense fun to watch." Ben Brantley of The New York Times called Amato's 2014 performance in King Lear "superb", and the Brooklyn Daily Eagle called her Regan "icily alluring". Joe Dziemianowicz of the New York Daily News wrote of the performance that "as second-born Regan, Bianca Amato's clipped and exasperated speech and body language suggest a woman who's up to her eyeballs in middle-child neglect. She's Jan Brady in period clothes."

==== Awards ====
Amato won the Vita Award for Best Newcomer for Under Milk Wood and the Fleur du Cap Theatre Award for Best Supporting Actress for Greek, both performed at the Baxter Theatre in Cape Town, South Africa. Her portrayal of Philippa De Villiers on Isidingo earned her an Avante for Best Actress in a Television Series and a Duku Duku Award for South Africa's Most Popular Actress. She later won the Star Tribune Award for best performance of 2004 for playing Eliza Doolittle in Pygmalion at the Guthrie Theater in Minneapolis, Minnesota. Her performance in Private Lives earned her an Elliot Norton Award for Outstanding Actress in 2013, and the Shakespeare Theatre Company's Emery Battis Award in 2014. Amato was also nominated for a 2013 Best Actress IRNE Award for Private Lives.

Amato has received ten AudioFile Earphones Awards and two Audie Awards for her audiobook performances.

== Personal life ==
Amato was born in Cape Town, South Africa. The daughter of "politically active parents", she "grew up keenly aware of the 'deep, deep troubles' of apartheid", and as a teen was a member of a left-wing organization called Pupils Awareness and Action Group. Amato graduated from the University of Cape Town. Amato is married to Neil Kuny, with whom she has a daughter.
