= Lady Margaret Beaufort =

English noblewoman and politician (1443–1509)

- The King's Mother; Countess of Richmond and Derby
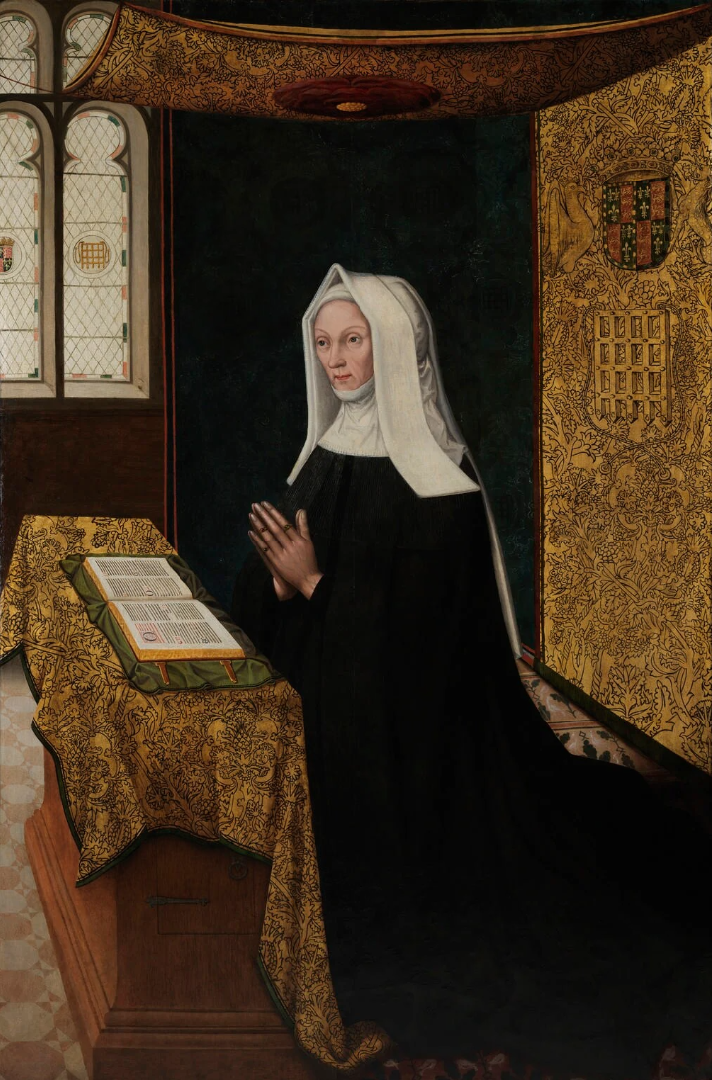
- Portrait by Meynnart Wewyck, c. 1510
- Born: 31 May 1443; Bletsoe Castle, Bedfordshire, England
- Died: 29 June 1509 (aged 66); Westminster Abbey, London, England
- Buried: Henry VII Lady Chapel, Westminster Abbey
- Noble family: Beaufort; Tudor (by marriage)
- Spouses: John de la Pole (m. 1450; ann. 1453) Edmund Tudor, 1st Earl of Richmond (m. 1455; died 1456) Sir Henry Stafford (m. 1458; died 1471) Thomas Stanley, 1st Earl of Derby (m. 1472; died 1504)
- Issue: Henry VII of England
- Father: John Beaufort, 1st Duke of Somerset
- Mother: Margaret Beauchamp of Bletso

Lady Margaret Beaufort (/ˈboʊfərt/ BOH-fərt or /ˈbjuːfərt/ BEW-fərt; 31 May 1443 – 29 June 1509) was a major figure in the Wars of the Roses of the late 15th century, and mother of Henry VII of England, the first Tudor monarch. She was instrumental in securing her son's accession to the throne, and is an ancestor of all English and British monarchs from Henry VII onwards.

A descendant of King Edward III, Lady Margaret passed a disputed claim to the English throne to her son, Henry Tudor. Capitalising on the political upheaval of the period, she actively manoeuvred to secure the crown for her son. Margaret's efforts ultimately culminated in Henry's decisive victory over King Richard III at the Battle of Bosworth Field in 1485. She was thus instrumental in orchestrating the rise to power of the Tudor dynasty. With her son crowned Henry VII, Margaret wielded a considerable degree of political influence and personal autonomy. She was also a major patron and cultural benefactor during her son's reign, initiating an era of extensive Tudor patronage.

Margaret is credited with the establishment of two prominent Cambridge colleges, founding Christ's College in 1505 and beginning the development of St John's College, which was completed posthumously by her executors in 1511. Lady Margaret Hall, Oxford, a 19th-century foundation named after her, was the first Oxford college to admit women.

== Origins ==
Lady Margaret Beaufort was the daughter and sole heiress of John Beaufort, Duke of Somerset (1404–1444), (a legitimised grandson of John of Gaunt and Gaunt's mistress Katherine Swynford), and John Beaufort's wife Margaret Beauchamp. Lady Margaret was born at Bletsoe Castle, Bedfordshire, either on 31 May 1441 or, more likely, on 31 May 1443. The day and month are not disputed, since she required Westminster Abbey to celebrate her birthday on 31 May, but the year of her birth is less certain. William Dugdale, the 17th-century antiquary, suggested that she had been born in 1441, based on evidence of inquisitions post mortem taken after the death of her father. Dugdale has been followed by a number of Lady Margaret's biographers; however, it is more likely that she was born in 1443, as in May 1443 her father had negotiated with the king concerning the wardship of his unborn child should he die on campaign.

== Early years ==
At the moment of her birth, Margaret's father was preparing to go to France and lead an important military expedition for King Henry VI. Somerset negotiated with the king to ensure that if he were to die, the rights to Margaret's wardship and marriage would be granted only to his wife.

As Somerset was a tenant-in-chief of the crown, the wardship of his heir fell to the crown under the feudal system. Somerset fell out with the king after coming back from France and was banished from the royal court pending a charge of treason against him. He died shortly afterwards. According to Thomas Basin, Somerset died of illness, but the Crowland Chronicle reported that his death was a suicide. As his only surviving child, Margaret was heiress to his considerable fortune and inheritor of his contested claim to the throne. Both effectively rendered Margaret, as her biographers Jones and Underwood write, "a pawn in the unstable political atmosphere of the Lancastrian court".

Upon her first birthday, the king broke the arrangement with Margaret's father and granted the wardship of her extensive lands to William de la Pole, 1st Duke of Suffolk, although Margaret herself remained in the custody of her mother. Margaret's mother was pregnant at the time of Somerset's death, but the child did not survive and Margaret remained the sole heir. Although she was her father's only legitimate child, Margaret had two maternal half-brothers and three maternal half-sisters from her mother's first marriage whom she supported after her son's accession to the throne.

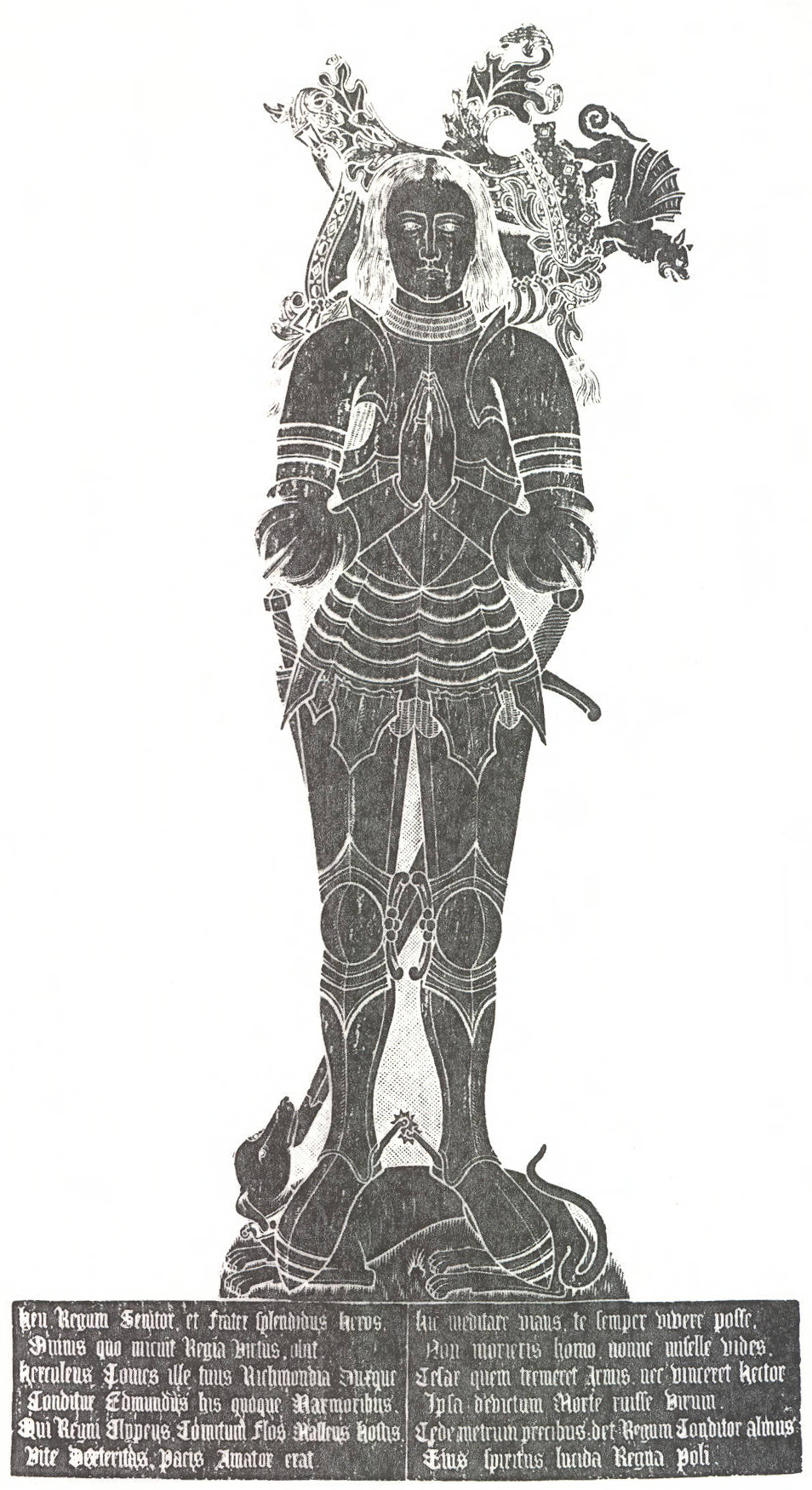
Monumental brass of Edmund Tudor, 1st Earl of Richmond, second husband of Lady Margaret Beaufort, in St David's Cathedral, Pembrokeshire

Margaret was married to Suffolk's son, John de la Pole. The wedding may have been held between 28 January and 7 February 1444, when she was perhaps a year old but certainly no more than three. However, there is more evidence to suggest they were married in January 1450, after Suffolk had been arrested and was looking to secure his son's future by betrothing him to a conveniently wealthy ward whose children could be potential claimants to the throne. Papal dispensation was granted on 18 August 1450, necessary because the spouses were closely related (Lady Margaret and de la Pole being the great-grandchildren of two sisters, Katherine Swynford and Philippa Chaucer, respectively), and this concurs with the later date of marriage. Three years later, her marriage to de la Pole was annulled, and King Henry VI granted Margaret's wardship to his own half-brothers, Jasper and Edmund Tudor.

Margaret never recognised the marriage to de la Pole. In her will, made in 1472, Margaret refers to Edmund Tudor as her first husband. Under canon law, Margaret was not bound by her first marriage contract as she was entered into the marriage before reaching the age of 12.

Even before the annulment of her first marriage, Henry VI chose Margaret as a bride for his half-brother, Edmund Tudor, 1st Earl of Richmond. This was likely to strengthen Edmund's claim to the throne should Henry be forced to designate Edmund his heir; the king was then without child or legitimate siblings. Edmund was the eldest son of the king's mother, Catherine of Valois, by Owen Tudor.

At nine years of age, Margaret was required to assent formally to the marriage. Later, she claimed she was divinely guided to do so.

At the age of 12, Margaret married Edmund Tudor, who was 12 years her senior, on 1 November 1455. The Wars of the Roses had just broken out. Edmund, a Lancastrian, was taken prisoner by Yorkist forces less than a year later. He died of the plague in captivity at Carmarthen on 3 November 1456, leaving a 13-year-old widow who was pregnant with their child.

The Countess always respected the name and memory of Edmund as the father of her only child. In 1472, 16 years after his death, Margaret specified in her will that she wanted to be buried alongside Edmund, even though she had enjoyed a long, stable and close marriage with her third husband, who had died in 1471.

=== Motherhood ===
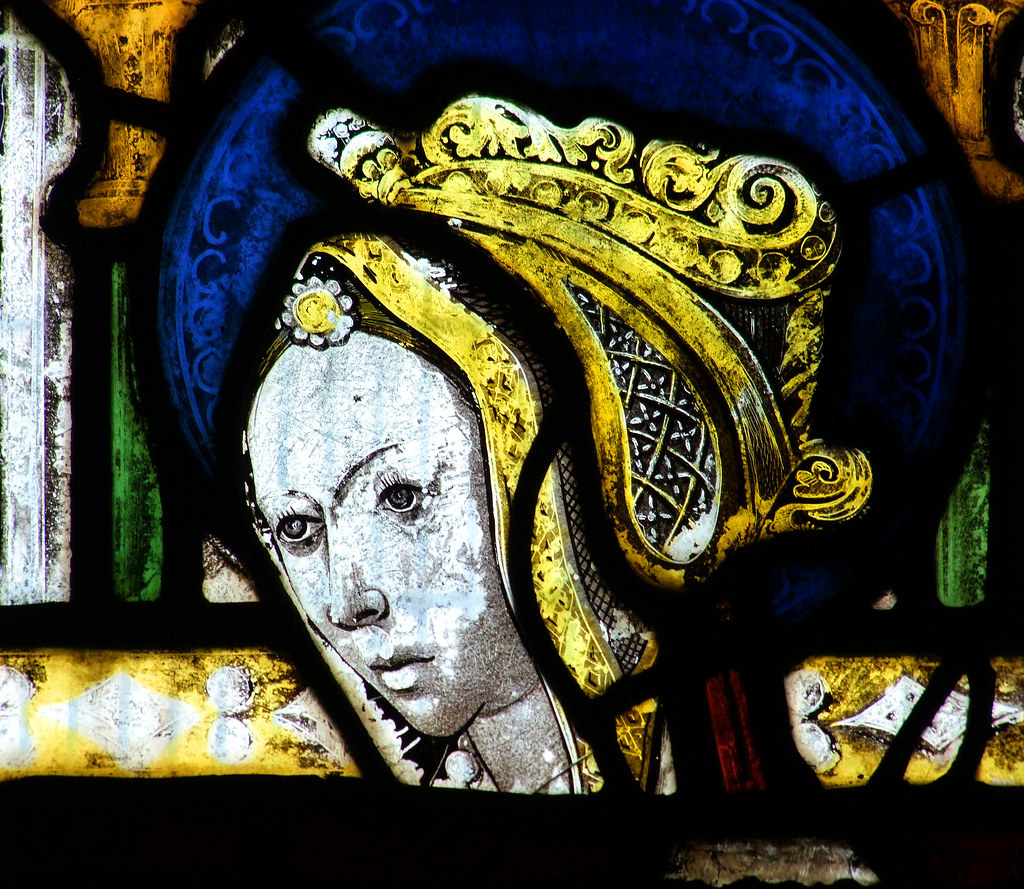
Stained-glass panel in All Saints' Church at Landbeach, Cambridgeshire, thought to depict a younger Margaret.

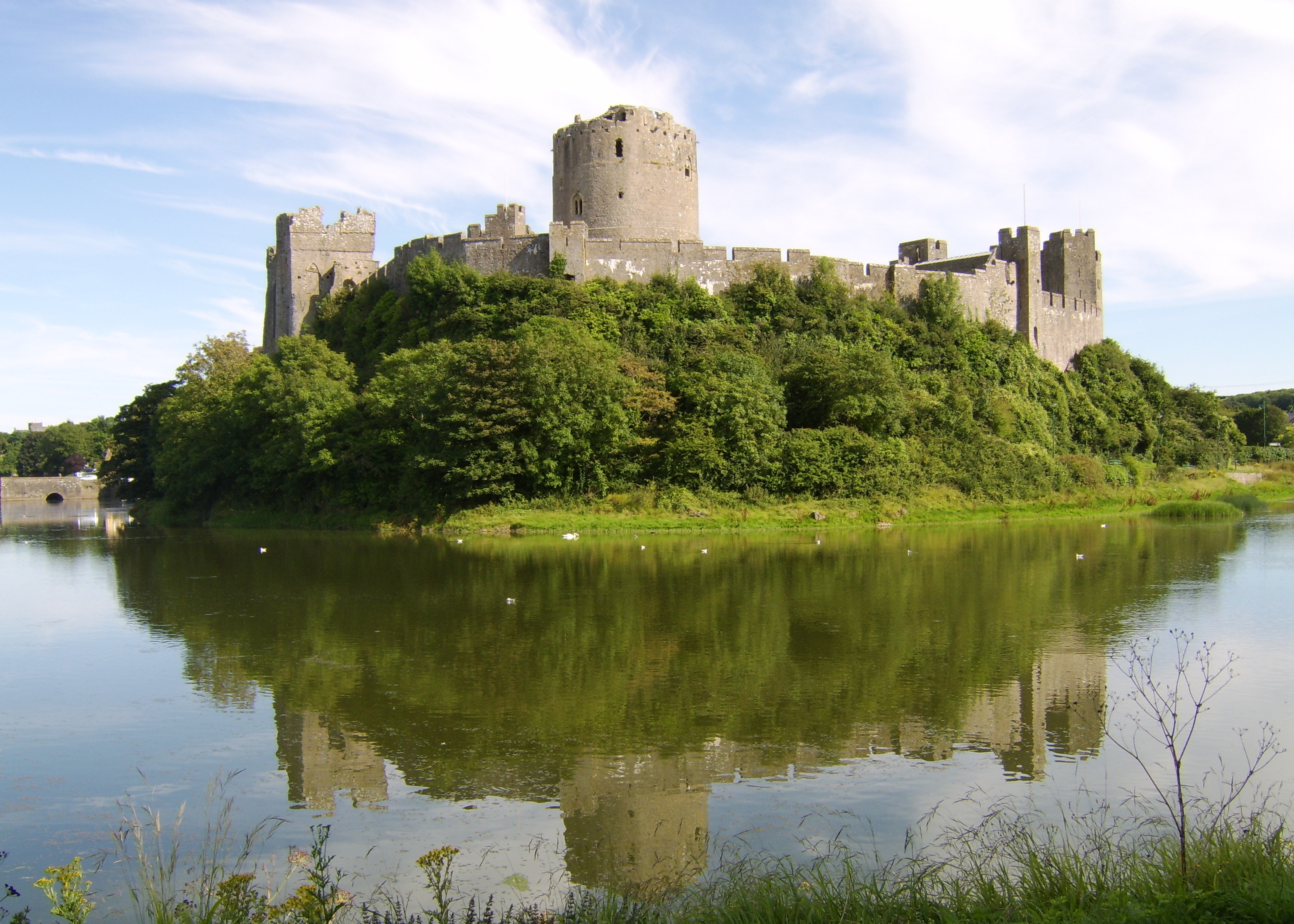
Pembroke Castle in 2007, the Norman castle where Margaret gave birth to Henry Tudor in 1457

While in the care of her brother-in-law Jasper Tudor, Earl of Pembroke, on 28 January 1457, the 13-year-old Margaret gave birth to a son, Henry Tudor, at Pembroke Castle. As she was not yet physically mature, the birth was extremely difficult. In a sermon delivered after her death, Margaret's confessor, John Fisher, deemed it a miracle that a baby could be born "of so little a personage". Her son's birth may have done permanent physical injury to Margaret; despite two later marriages, she never had another child. Years later, she enumerated a set of proper procedures concerning the delivery of potential heirs, perhaps informed by the difficulty of her own experience.

Shortly after her re-entry into society after the birth, Jasper helped arrange another marriage for her to ensure her son's security. She married Sir Henry Stafford (c. 1425–1471), the second son of Humphrey Stafford, 1st Duke of Buckingham, on 3 January 1458, at the age of 14. A dispensation for the marriage was necessary because Margaret and Stafford were second cousins; it was granted on 6 April 1457. They enjoyed a fairly long and harmonious marital relationship and were given Woking Palace, to which Margaret sometimes retreated and which she restored. Margaret and her husband were given 400 marks' worth of land by Buckingham, but her own estates were still their main source of income. For a time the Staffords were able to visit Margaret's son, who had been entrusted to Jasper Tudor's care at Pembroke Castle in Wales.

== Involvement in the Wars of the Roses ==
=== Reign of Edward IV ===
Years of Yorkist forces fighting Lancastrian for power culminated in the Battle of Towton in 1461, where the Yorkists were victorious. Edward IV was King of England. The fighting had taken the life of Margaret's father-in-law and forced Jasper Tudor to flee to Scotland and France to muster support for the Lancastrian cause. Edward IV gave the lands belonging to Margaret's son to his own brother, the Duke of Clarence. Henry became the ward of Sir William Herbert. Again, Beaufort was allowed some visits to her son.

In 1469 the discontented Duke of Clarence and Earl of Warwick incited a rebellion against Edward IV, capturing him after a defeat of his forces. Beaufort used this opportunity to attempt to negotiate with Clarence, hoping to regain custody of her son and his holdings. Soon, however, Edward was back in power.

Warwick's continued insurrection resulted in the brief reinstallation of the Lancastrian Henry VI in 1470–71, which was effectively ended with the Yorkist victory at the Battle of Barnet. Faced with York rule once again, Margaret allegedly begged Jasper Tudor, forced to flee abroad once more, to take 13-year-old Henry with him. It would be 14 years before Beaufort saw her son again.

In 1471, Margaret's husband, Lord Stafford, died of wounds suffered at the Battle of Barnet, fighting for the Yorkists. At 28 years old, Margaret became a widow again.

In June 1472, Margaret married Thomas Stanley, the Lord High Constable and King of Mann. Jones and Underwood have suggested that Margaret never considered herself a member of the Stanley family. Their marriage was primarily one of convenience; marrying Stanley enabled Margaret to return to the court of Edward IV and Elizabeth Woodville. Indeed, Gristwood speculates Beaufort organised the marriage with the sole aim of rehabilitating her image and securing herself a prime position from which to advocate for her son. Evidently her efforts were successful; Margaret was chosen by Queen Elizabeth to be godmother to one of her daughters.

Holinshed, a Tudor chronicler, claims King Edward IV later proposed a marriage between Beaufort's son and his own daughter, Elizabeth of York, intending to force Henry Tudor out of his safe haven on the continent. Poet Bernard Andre seems to corroborate this, writing of Tudor's miraculous escape from the clutches of Edward's envoys, allegedly warned of the deception by none other than his mother.

=== Reigns of Edward V and Richard III ===
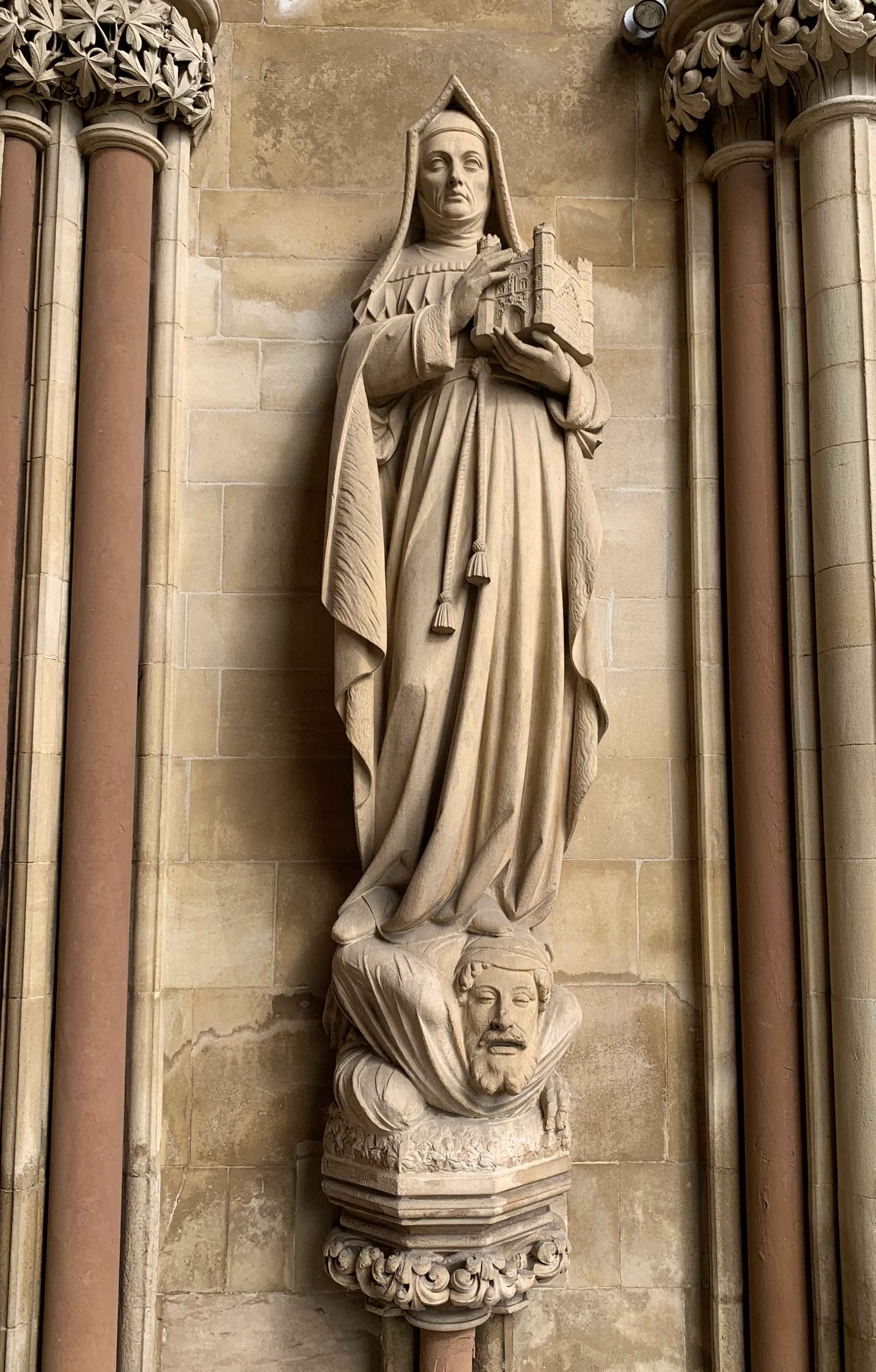
Statue of Margaret Beaufort in the Chapel of St John's College, Cambridge, which she founded

Following Edward IV's death in April 1483 and the seizure of the throne in June by Richard III from Edward V, Margaret was soon back at court serving the new queen, Anne Neville. Margaret carried Anne's train at the coronation. Seeking her son's return to England, Margaret appears to have negotiated with Richard.

Despite what these negotiations may suggest, Lady Margaret is known to have conspired with Elizabeth Woodville, mother of the two York princes whom Richard confined to the Tower of London, after rumours spread of the boys' murder. It was at this point, according to Polydore Vergil, that Beaufort "began to hope well of her son's fortune".

Beaufort is believed to have initiated discussions with Woodville, via mutual physician, Lewis Caerleon, who conveyed secret correspondences between the two women. Together they conspired to supplant King Richard and by joint force replace him with Margaret's son, Henry Tudor. Their solidified alliance further secured the subsequent dynasty by the agreed betrothal of Henry to Elizabeth of York. They hoped this proposal would attract both Yorkist and Lancastrian support.

As to the fate of the princes, it is widely held that Richard III ordered the death of his two nephews to secure his own reign. Gristwood, however, suggests that another was responsible; Henry Tudor's path to the throne was certainly expedited by their disappearance, perhaps motive enough for his mother – his "highly able and totally committed representative" – to give the order.

Despite this suggestion, no contemporary sources corroborate the implication, whilst most contemporary accounts outline "her outstanding qualities, her courage, presence of mind, family loyalty, and a deeply felt awareness of the spiritual responsibilities of high office," as clarified by Jones and Underwood. Before Jones and Underwood, there was no consensus within the scholarly community regarding Margaret's role or character: historiographical opinions ranged from celebrating her to demonising her.

It was not until the 17th century that religious retrospective speculations began to criticise Lady Margaret, but even then only as a "politic and contriving woman," and never anything beyond shrewd or calculating. All things considered, the words of her own contemporaries, such as Tudor historian Polydore Vergil, continue to extol Lady Margaret's noble virtues as "the most pious woman," further removing her from accusations of wickedness.

Erasmus, in writing about his friend the Bishop, Saint John Fisher, praised Margaret's support of religious institutions and the Bishop, further attesting the simultaneously pragmatic and charitable nature testified in the funerary sermon dedicated by the Bishop himself, as laid out in a following section.

In 1483 Margaret was certainly involved in – if not the mastermind behind – Buckingham's rebellion. Indeed, in his biography of Richard III, historian Paul Murray Kendall describes Beaufort as the "Athena of the rebellion". Perhaps with duplicitous motives (as he may have been desirous of the crown for himself), Buckingham conspired with Beaufort and Woodville to dethrone Richard. Margaret's son was to sail from Brittany to join forces with him, but he arrived too late.

In October, Beaufort's scheme proved unsuccessful; the Duke was executed and Tudor was forced back across the English Channel. Beaufort appears to have played a large role in financing the insurrection. In response to her betrayal, Richard passed an act of Parliament stripping Margaret of all her titles and estates, declaring her guilty of the following:

Forasmoch as Margaret Countesse of Richmond, Mother to the Kyngs greate Rebell and Traytour, Herry Erle of Richemond, hath of late conspired, consedered, and comitted high Treason ayenst oure Soveraigne Lorde the King Richard the Third, in dyvers and sundry wyses, and in especiall in sendyng messages, writyngs and tokens to the said Henry... Also the said Countesse made chevisancez of greate somes of Money... and also the said Countesse conspired, consedered, and imagyned the destruction of oure said Soveraign Lorde...

Richard did, however, stop short of a full attainder by transferring Margaret's property to her husband, Lord Stanley. He also effectively imprisoned Margaret in her husband's home with the hope of preventing any further correspondence with her son. However, her husband failed to stop Margaret's continued communication with her son. When the time came for Henry to press his claim, he relied heavily on his mother to raise support for him in England.

Margaret's husband Stanley, despite having fought for Richard III during the Buckingham rebellion, did not respond when summoned to fight at the Battle of Bosworth Field in 1485, remaining aloof from the battle, even though his eldest son, George Stanley (styled Lord Strange), was held hostage by Richard. After the battle, it was Stanley who placed the crown on the head of his stepson (Henry VII), who later made him Earl of Derby. Margaret was then styled "Countess of Richmond and Derby". She was invested as a Lady of the Order of the Garter (LG) in 1488.

English royal families in the Wars of the Roses

Dukes (except Aquitaine) and Princes of Wales are noted, as are the monarchs' reigns.
†=Killed in action; =Executed
See also Family tree of English monarchs

Henry of Grosmont; Duke of Lancaster	Edward III; King of England r. 1327–1377
Edward of Woodstock "The Black Prince"; Prince of Wales	Thomas of Woodstock; Duke of Gloucester	Blanche of Lancaster	John of Gaunt; Duke of Lancaster	Katherine Swynford	Edmund of Langley; Duke of York	Lionel of Antwerp; Duke of Clarence
Edward of Angoulême	Richard II; Prince of Wales, King of England r. 1377–1399	Henry IV; Duke of Lancaster, King of England r. 1399–1413	John Beaufort	Thomas Beaufort; Duke of Exeter	Joan Beaufort	Ralph Neville	Philippa of Clarence
Owen Tudor; Lancastrian	Catherine of Valois	Henry V Duke of Lancaster, Prince of Wales, King of England r. 1413–1422	Humphrey; Duke of Gloucester	Henry Percy "Hotspur"	Elizabeth Mortimer	Roger Mortimer
Edward of Norwich; Duke of York	Richard of Conisburgh	Anne de Mortimer
John Beaufort; Duke of Somerset; Lancastrian	Margaret of Anjou; Lancastrian	Henry VI; King of England r. 1422–1461, r. 1470–1471; Lancastrian	Edmund Beaufort; Duke of Somerset; Lancastrian †1st St Albans	William Neville; Yorkist	Anne Neville	Henry Percy; Lancastrian †1st St Albans	Eleanor Neville	Richard Neville; Yorkist; (executed) Wakefield	Cecily Neville	Richard of York; Duke of York, Prince of Wales; Yorkist †Wakefield
Henry Beaufort; Duke of Somerset; Lancastrian; (executed) Hexham	Richard Woodville; (executed) Edgecote	Edmund Beaufort; Duke of Somerset; Lancastrian; (executed) Tewkesbury	Margaret Beaufort	Humphrey Stafford	Henry Percy; Lancastrian †Towton	John Neville; Yorkist, then Lancastrian †Barnet	Richard Neville "Kingmaker"; Yorkist, then Lancastrian †Barnet
Margaret Beaufort; Lancastrian	Edmund Tudor; Lancastrian	Jasper Tudor; Duke of Bedford; Lancastrian	Catherine Woodville	Henry Stafford; Duke of Buckingham; Yorkist, then Lancastrian (executed)	Elizabeth Woodville	Edward IV; Duke of York, King of England r. 1461–1470, r. 1471–1483; Yorkist	George Plantagenet; Duke of Clarence; Yorkist, then Lancastrian; (executed) Tower	Edward of Westminster; Prince of Wales; Lancastrian †Tewkesbury	Anne Neville	Richard III; Duke of Gloucester, King of England r. 1483–1485; Yorkist †Bosworth Field
Henry VII; King of England; Lancastrian r. 1485–1509	Elizabeth of York	Edward V Prince of Wales, King of England r. 1483; Yorkist; (executed) Tower	Richard of Shrewsbury; Duke of York; (executed) Tower

== Margaret Beaufort in power ==
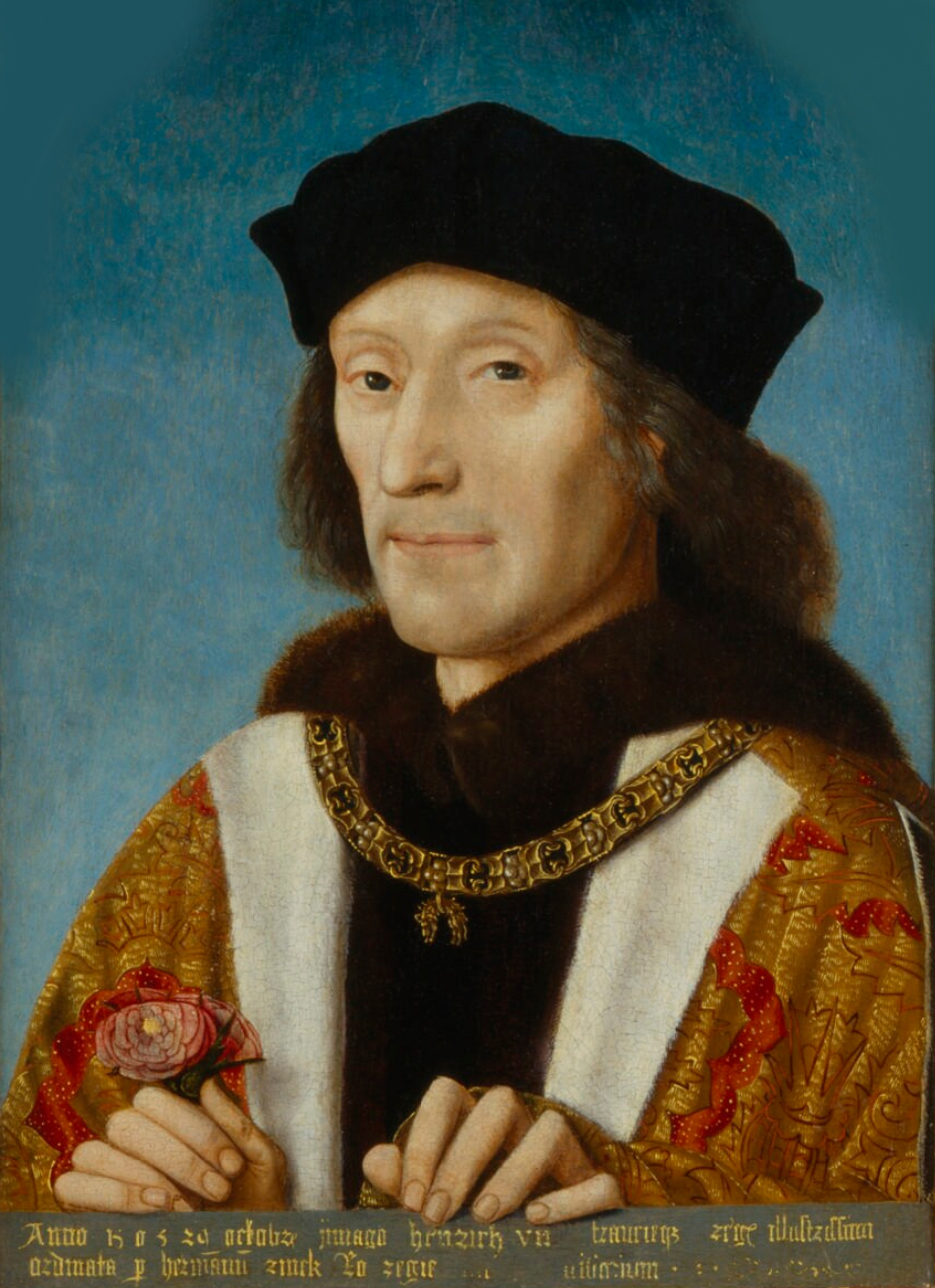
Henry VII of England, Margaret's only child

Countess of Richmond and Derby Act 1491
- Act of Parliament
- Parliament of England
- Long title: Pro Comitissa Richemond & Derby.
- Citation: 7 Hen. 7. c. 15 (Note: This is the citation in The Statutes of the Realm.); 7 Hen. 7. c. 8 Pr. (Note: This is the citation in The Statutes at Large.)
- Territorial extent: England and Wales; Ireland

Dates
- Royal assent: 5 March 1492
- Commencement: 17 October 1491
- Repealed: 30 July 1948
Other legislation
Repealed by	Statute Law Revision Act 1948

Status: Repealed

Text of statute as originally enacted

After her son's victory at the Battle of Bosworth Field, the Countess was referred to in court as "My Lady the King's Mother". Her son's first Parliament reversed the attainder against her and declared her a feme sole. This status granted Beaufort considerable legal and social independence from men. She was allowed to own property separately from her husband (as though she were unmarried) and sue in court – two rights denied to contemporary married women.

Coat of arms of Lady Margaret Beaufort

As arranged by their mothers, Henry married Elizabeth of York. The Countess was reluctant to accept a lower status than the dowager queen Elizabeth or even her daughter-in-law, the queen consort. She wore robes of the same quality as the queen consort and walked only half a pace behind her. Elizabeth's biographer, Amy Licence, states that this "would have been the correct courtly protocol", adding that "only one person knew how Elizabeth really felt about Margaret and she did not commit it to paper."

Margaret had written her signature as M. Richmond for years, since the 1460s. In 1499, she changed her signature to Margaret R., perhaps to signify her royal authority (R standing either for regina – queen in Latin as customarily employed by female monarchs – or for Richmond). Furthermore, she included the Tudor crown and the caption et mater Henrici septimi regis Angliæ et Hiberniæ ("and mother of Henry VII, king of England and Ireland").

Many historians believe the departure from court of dowager queen Elizabeth Woodville in 1487 was partly at the behest of Henry's influential mother, though this is uncertain.

Beaufort exerted considerable political influence within the Tudor court. The power she exercised was evidently obvious; a report from Spanish envoy Pedro de Ayala dating to 1498 claimed Henry was "much influenced by his mother and his followers in affairs or personal interest and in others." In the earlier years of her son's reign, records indicate Margaret usually accompanied the royal couple when they traveled.

While Margaret's position in the royal court was, to some extent, an expression of gratitude by her son, she was likely far less the passive recipient of Henry's favor one might expect. As Gristwood suggests in the following, Beaufort instead actively contrived to further her standing:

"A place had to be created for the sort of 'king's mother' Margaret was determined to be. Perhaps if Margaret had become a queen, a role that she clearly felt Fortune had denied her, she would not have felt the need to press for her rights quite so stridently."

However, Lady Margaret's immediate petitions were not for queenly powers of rule over others, but were two succinct demands for independence and liberty of self, which were products of expert legal advice, as opposed to a desperate desire to rule.

The first act reversed the legislation that had robbed Margaret of her properties under the reign of Richard III, deeming it "entirely void, annulled and of no force or effect". The second act of November 1485 stated that she would enjoy all her properties and titles, and could pursue any legal action as any "single unmarried person might or may do at any time", despite still being married.

Moreover, as with many decisions made to secure the new dynasty, these Acts of Parliament passed appear to be a collaborative effort, mutually beneficial to both mother and son, as by granting Margaret the status of a femme sole, Henry and his Parliament made it possible to empower the King's Mother without giving further leverage to the Stanleys, since Margaret could use any wealth granted to her for her own purposes, thereby circumventing the prevailing idea of coverture.

In his chronicle, Polydore Vergil assessed the partnership between the Tudor king and his mother, noting that Henry gave her a share of most of his public and private resources, contrary to any assertion that Margaret desired greater power. Or, as King Henry Tudor states in a letter to his mother: "...not only in this but in all other things that I may know should be to your honour and pleasure, and will of your self, I shall be as glad to please you as your heart can desire."

Lady Margaret's wardship of brothers Edward Stafford, 3rd Duke of Buckingham, and Henry Stafford, 1st Earl of Wiltshire, is an example of how her position allowed her to operate beyond the scope of her role as queen, a position which proved advantageous to the state of the Crown and delineated her as one of its agents, as she refused monetary recompense for her stewardship in this area and secured the allegiance of the Duke of Buckingham to King Henry Tudor, a loyalty that would fade away from the Crown once she and her son were dead.

Later in her marriage, the Countess preferred living alone. In 1499, with her husband's permission, she took a vow of chastity in the presence of Richard FitzJames, Bishop of London. Taking a vow of chastity while being married was unusual but not unprecedented. The Countess moved away from her husband and lived alone at Collyweston, Northamptonshire (near Stamford). She was regularly visited by her husband, who had rooms reserved for him. Margaret renewed her vows in 1504. From her principal residence at Collyweston, she was given a special commission to administer justice over the Midlands and the North.

Beaufort was also actively involved in the domestic life of the royal family. She created a proper protocol regarding the birth and upbringing of royal heirs. Though their relationship is often portrayed as antagonistic, Beaufort and her daughter-in-law Elizabeth worked together when planning the marriages of the royal children. They wrote jointly of the necessary instruction for Catherine of Aragon, who was to marry Elizabeth's son Prince Arthur. Both women also conspired to prevent Elizabeth and Henry's daughter Margaret from being married to the Scottish king at too young an age; in this matter, Gristwood writes, Beaufort was undoubtedly resolved that her granddaughter "should not share her fate".

After Elizabeth's death in 1503, Margaret became the principal female presence at court. When Arthur died, Margaret played a part in ensuring her grandson Henry, the new heir apparent, was raised appropriately by selecting some members of his new household.

The Countess was known for her education and her piety. Biographers Jones and Underwood claim the entirety of Beaufort's life can be understood in the context of her "deeply-felt love and loyalty to her son". Henry is said to have been likewise devoted. A surviving letter written by Henry to his mother reveals his sense of gratitude and appreciation:

"All which thyngs according to your desire and plesure I have with all my herte and goode wille giffen and graunted unto you... I shall be as glad to plese you as youre herte can desire hit, and I knowe welle that I am as much bounden so to doe as any creture lyvyng, for the grete and singular moderly love and affection that hit hath plesed you at all tymes to ber towards me".

Henry VII died on 21 April 1509, having designated his mother chief executrix of his will. For two days after the death of her son, Margaret scrambled to secure the smooth succession of her grandson, Henry VIII. She arranged her son's funeral and her grandson's coronation. At her son's funeral she was given precedence over all the other women of the royal family.

Before her death, Beaufort also left her mark on the early reign of Henry VIII; when her 18-year-old grandson chose members of his privy council, it was Margaret's suggestions he took.

== Death ==
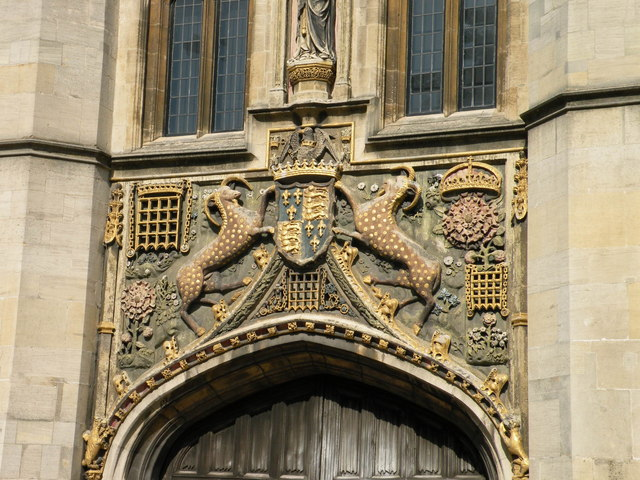
Coat of arms at Christ's College, Cambridge with two yales as supporters

Margaret had been ill for several days, as legend has it, after eating a cygnet (a young swan) for dinner. The Countess died in the Deanery of Westminster Abbey on 29 June 1509. This was the day after her grandson Henry VIII's 18th birthday, 5 days after his coronation and just over two months after the death of her son.

She had made her will and a schedule of bequests in February 1509, making arrangements for her funeral and donations to religious foundations. She made bequests of her jewellery and gold cups to Catherine of Aragon, Margaret Tudor, and Mary Tudor, and a chalice to the parish church at Collyweston.

Margaret is buried in the Henry VII Chapel of the Abbey. Her tomb is now situated between the later graves of William III and Mary II and the tomb of her great-great-granddaughter Mary, Queen of Scots.

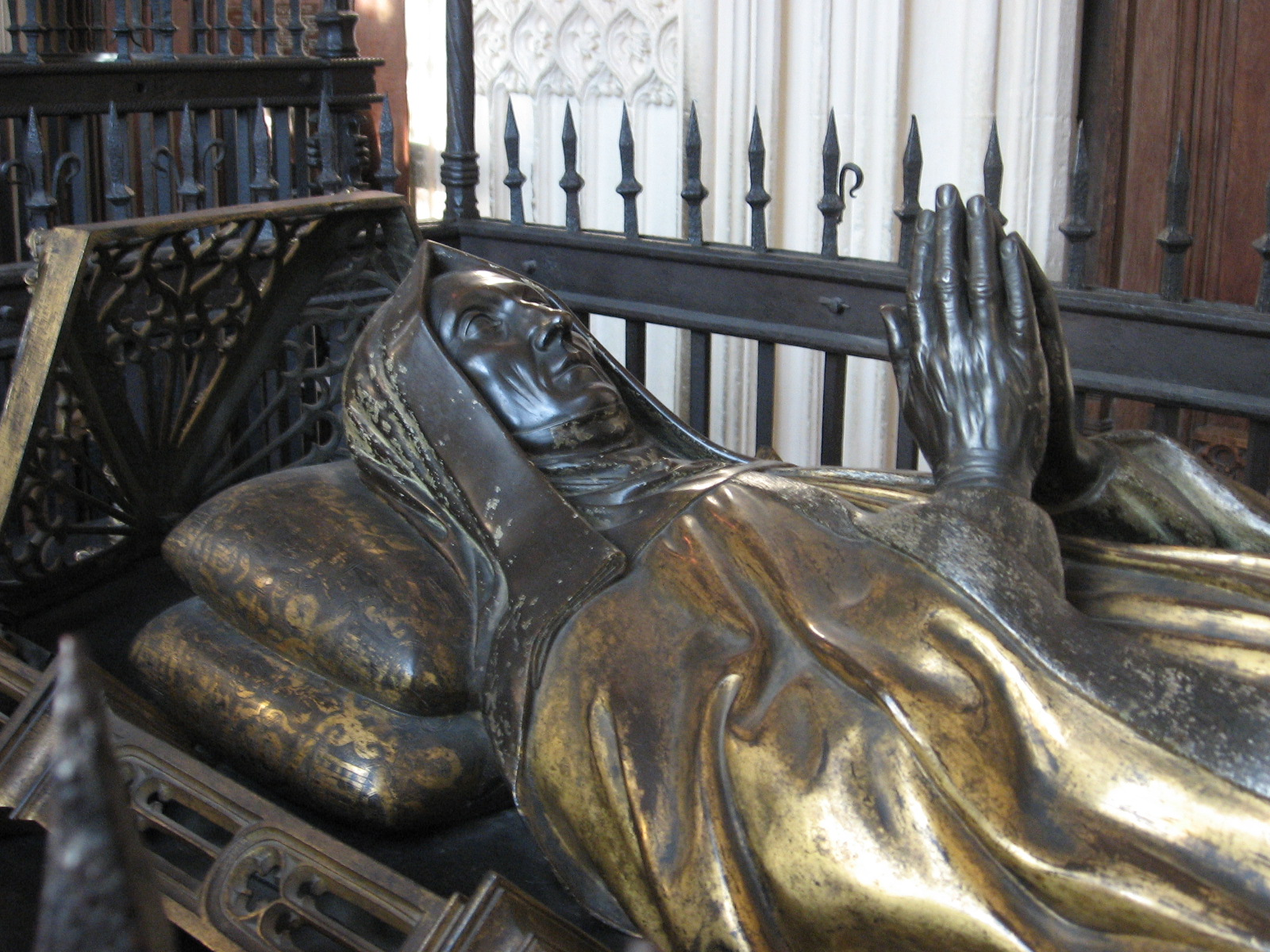
Tomb of Lady Margaret Beaufort, Westminster Abbey

Her tomb was created by Pietro Torrigiano, who probably arrived in England in 1509 and received the commission in the following year. The gilded bronze sculpture on the tomb depicts Margaret with her head resting on pillows and her hands raised in prayer, wearing garments characteristic of widowhood; the face was probably sculpted from a death mask. The black marble tomb is embellished with heraldic bronze insignia, including a yale, her heraldic badge, at her feet.

Erasmus wrote the Latin inscription on her tomb. In English it reads: "Margaret, Countess of Richmond, mother of Henry VII, grandmother of Henry VIII, who donated funds for three monks of this abbey, a grammar school in Wimborne, a preacher in the whole of England, two lecturers in Scripture, one at Oxford, the other at Cambridge, where she also founded two colleges, one dedicated to Christ, and the other to St John, the Evangelist."

In 1539 iron railings, elaborately painted with coats of arms and other ornaments, were erected around the tomb. The ironwork was sold off by the Abbey in 1823 but recovered and restored a century later.

== Legacy ==
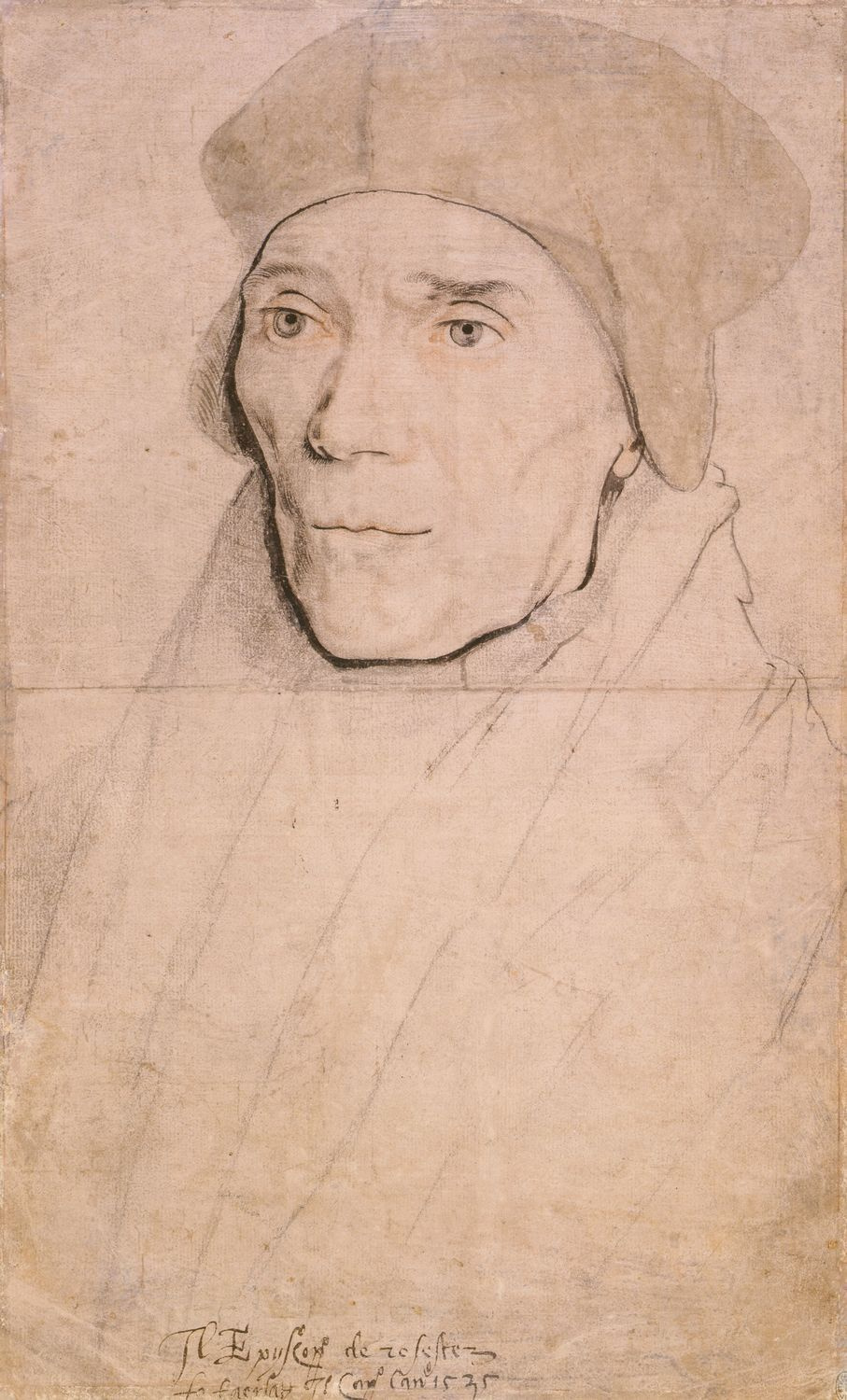
John Fisher, Margaret's chaplain and confessor from 1497 until her death. Hans Holbein the Younger, Royal Collection

She was bounteous and lyberal to every Person of her Knowledge or acquaintance. Avarice and Covetyse she most hated, and sorowed it full moche in all persons, but specially in ony that belong'd unto her. She was of syngular Easyness to be spoken unto, and full curtayse answere she would make to all that came unto her. Of marvayllous gentyleness she was unto all folks, but specially unto her owne, whom she trustede, and loved ryghte tenderly. Unkynde she woulde not be unto no creature, ne forgetful of ony kyndeness or servyce done to her before, which is no lytel part of veray nobleness. She was not vengeable ne cruell, but redy anone to forgete and to forgyve injuryes done unto her, at the least desyre or mocyon made unto her for the same. Mercyfull also and pyteous she was unto such as was greyved and wrongfully troubled, and to them that were in Poverty and sekeness, or any other mysery.

— John Fisher, 1509, extract from funeral sermon

Lady Margaret Beaufort was a lifelong artistic patron and supporter of academia. Margaret commissioned the first English parody mass from Robert Fayrfax based on his earlier motet, O bone Jesu.

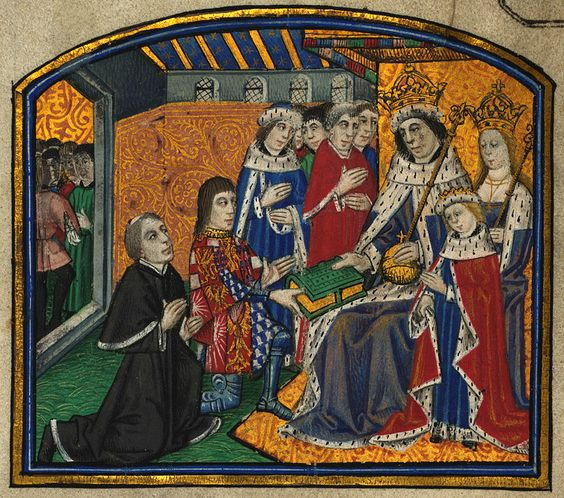
Presentation miniature of Dictes and Sayings of the Philosophers, the earliest dated book printed in the English language, by William Caxton. The miniature depicts Anthony Woodville presenting the book to Edward IV, accompanied by his wife Elizabeth Woodville, his son Edward, Prince of Wales and his brother Richard, Duke of Gloucester

While married to Lord Stanley, Margaret endowed the building of chapels in Wales. Like Edward IV and his court, she was also involved with the advances in printing of William Caxton and his successor Wynkyn de Worde, not only as a patroness but for her own acquisition. The first book she commissioned from Caxton in 1483 was the 13th-century French romance Blanchardin et Eglantine, which mirrored fairly closely the match she was forging in secret between her son Henry and Elizabeth of York, with the aid of Elizabeth Woodville, then in sanctuary from Richard III in Westminster Abbey. Six years later, after Richard's defeat by Henry at Bosworth, she commissioned an English translation of the romance from Caxton: it heralded the beginning of a period of Tudor patronage. Apart from encouraging book production and building her own library, Margaret also achieved considerable success as a translator, becoming the first English translator of the Imitation of Christ known by name, as well as translating the 15th-century Netherlandish treatise The Mirror of Gold for the Sinful Soul from a French intermediary. She published those translations at Richard Pynson, then returned to Wynkyn de Worde for commissions of translation of more religious works. Margaret Beaufort not only supported individual printers, but also the competition between them, playing an active role in the development of the early modern print market.

In 1497 she announced her intention to build a free school for the general public of Wimborne. Following her death in 1509, Wimborne Grammar School came into existence, to become Queen Elizabeth's School, Wimborne Minster.

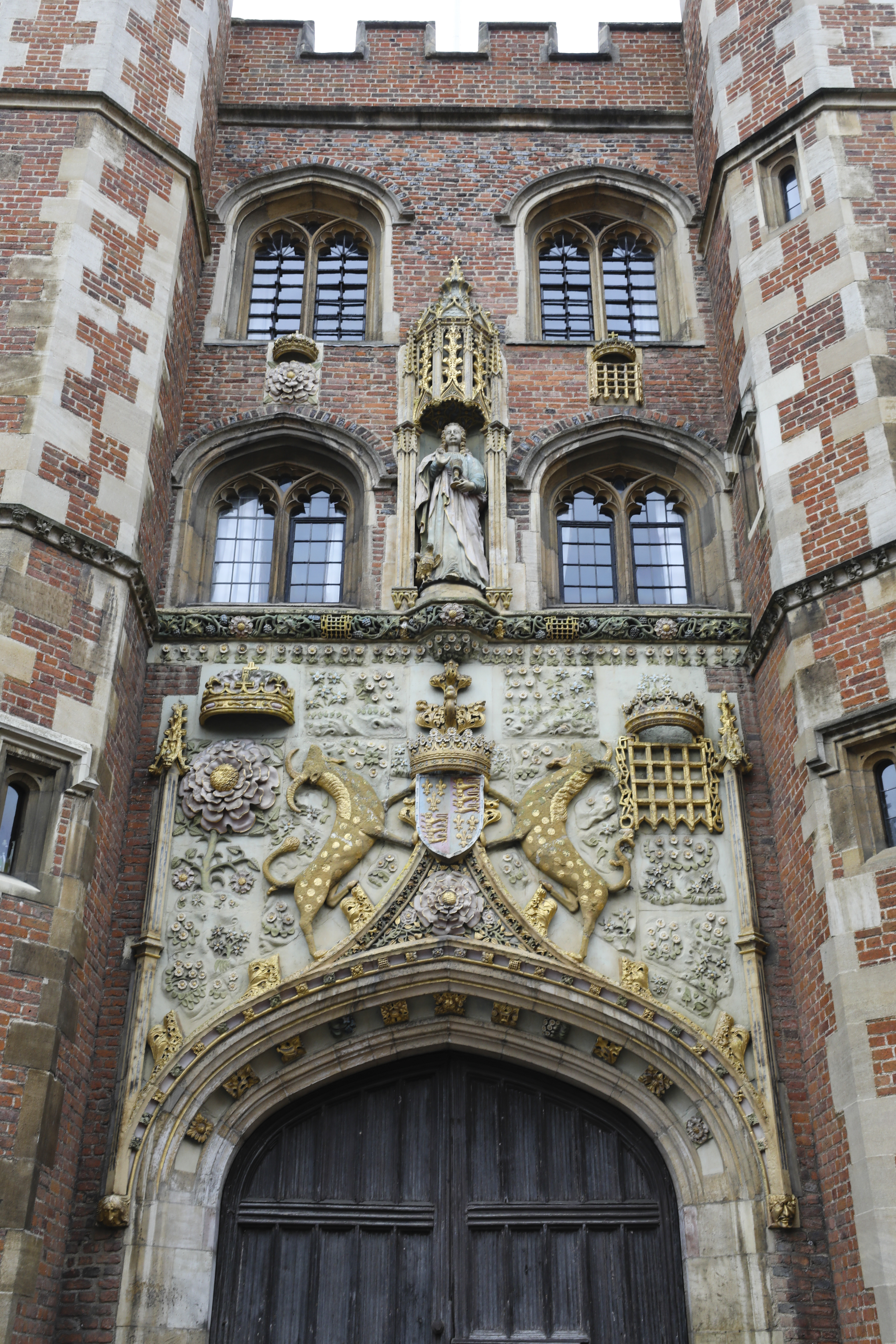
The Great Gate of St. John's College, Cambridge

In 1502 she established the Lady Margaret's Professorship of Divinity at the University of Cambridge. In 1505 she refounded and enlarged God's House, Cambridge as Christ's College, Cambridge with a royal charter from the king. She has been honoured ever since as the Foundress of the college. A copy of her signature can be found carved on one of the buildings (4 staircase, 1994) within the college. In 1511, St. John's College, Cambridge was founded by her estate, either at her direct behest or at the suggestion of her chaplain, John Fisher. Land that she owned around Great Bradley in Suffolk was bequeathed to St. John's upon its foundation. Her portraits hang in the Great Halls and other college rooms of both Christ's and St. John's, accompanied by portraits of John Fisher. Unusually, both colleges have the same coats of arms, using her crest and motto. Furthermore, various societies, including the Lady Margaret Society as well as the Beaufort Club at Christ's, and the Lady Margaret Boat Club at John's, were named after her.

In 1540, funds she had bequeathed endowed a lectureship in divinity at the University of Oxford, first held by John Roper; it became the Lady Margaret Professorship of Divinity, held concurrently with a canonship at Christ Church, Oxford. Lady Margaret Hall, the first women's college at the University of Oxford (founded in 1878), was named in her honour.

A practical woman, when faced with problems of flooding in parts of the Fens that threatened some of her properties, she was able to initiate an ambitious drainage scheme, involving foreign engineers, that saw the construction of a large sluice at Boston. She funded the restoration of Church of All Saints, Martock in Somerset, and the construction of the church tower.

In 1993, the Margaret Beaufort Institute of Theology on Grange Road, Cambridge, was founded and named in her honour. It is now a coeducational interdenominational theological college, having originally begun as a centre for training Catholic laywomen in religion and theology.

== Portraits ==
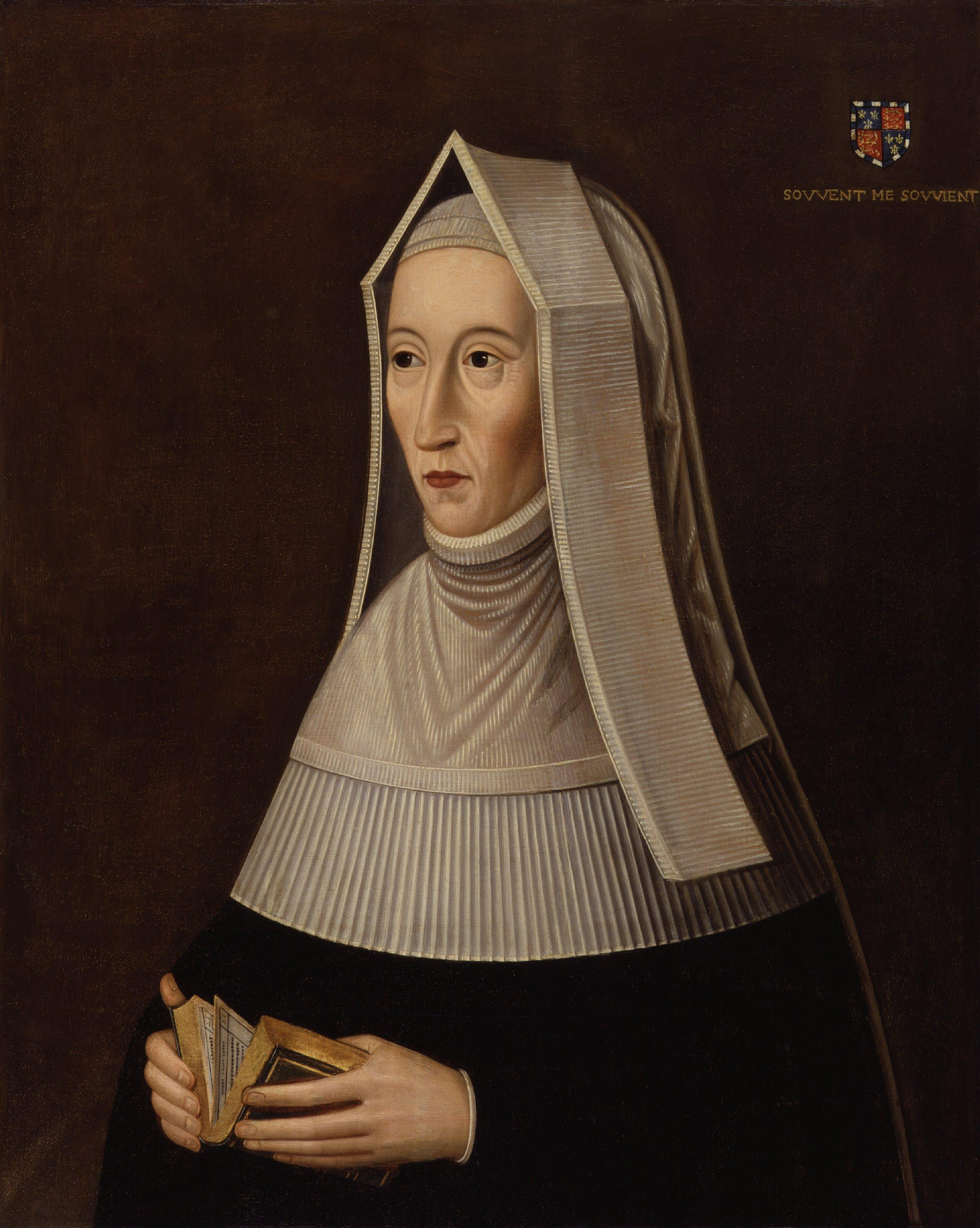
Anonymous 17th-century portrait of Margaret in widow's garb

There is no surviving portrait of Margaret Beaufort dating from her lifetime. All known portraits, however, are in essentially the same format, depicting her in her later years, wearing a long, peaked, white headdress and in a pose of religious contemplation. Most of these were made in the reign of Henry VIII and Elizabeth I as symbols of loyalty to the Tudor regime. They may be based on a lost original, or be derived from the sculpture on her tomb in Westminster Abbey, in which she wears the same headdress.

One portrait by Meynnart Wewyck in 1510 shows her at prayer in her richly furnished private closet behind her chamber. The plain desk at which she kneels is draped with a richly patterned textile that is so densely encrusted with embroidery that its corners stand away stiffly. Her lavishly illuminated Book of Hours is open before her, with its protective cloth wrapper (called a "chemise" binding), spread out around it. The walls are patterned with oak leaf designs, perhaps in lozenges, perhaps of stamped and part-gilded leather. Against the wall hangs the dosser of her canopy of estate, with the tester above her head (the Tudor rose at its centre) supported on cords from the ceiling. The coats-of-arms woven into the tapestry are of England (parted as usual with France) and the portcullis badge of the Beauforts, which the early Tudor kings later used in their arms. Small stained-glass roundels in the leaded glass of her lancet windows also display elements of the arms of both England (cropped away here) and Beaufort. The painting, which measures 180 cm by 122 cm, is notable as the first large-scale portrait of an Englishwoman.

In 2023, restoration work on the Wewyck portrait revealed that it had been overpainted several times throughout its history, with Margaret's original facial expression made more sombre and pious.

== Ancestry ==
Ancestors of Margaret Beaufort

8. John of Gaunt, 1st Duke of Lancaster
4. John Beaufort, 1st Earl of Somerset
9. Katherine Roet
2. John Beaufort, 1st Duke of Somerset
10. Thomas Holland, 2nd Earl of Kent
5. Margaret Holland
11. Alice FitzAlan
1. Lady Margaret Beaufort
12. Sir Roger Beauchamp
6. John Beauchamp
13. Mary
3. Margaret Beauchamp
14. John Stourton
7. Edith Stourton

== Depictions in later media ==
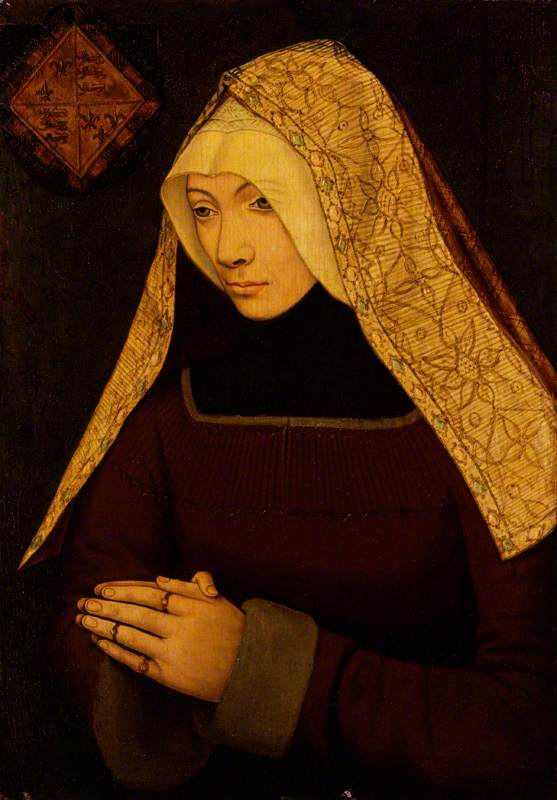
19th-century portrait, perhaps intended as Lady Margaret Beaufort, National Portrait Gallery, London

=== In historical fiction ===
- Betty King, The Lady Margaret (1965), a story about the marriage of Margaret Beaufort and Edmund Tudor, parents of King Henry VII
- Betty King, The King's Mother (1969), sequel to the above, the story of the widowed Margaret Beaufort, mother of the future King Henry VII
- Iris Gower, Destiny's Child (1999). This novel was originally published in 1974 as Bride of the Thirteenth Summer, under the name Iris Davies.
- Philippa Gregory, in the series The Plantagenet and Tudor Novels (in publication order):
  - The Constant Princess (2005), about the young Catherine of Aragon and her early life in England
  - The White Queen (2009), about Elizabeth Woodville
  - The Red Queen (2010), about Margaret Beaufort herself
  - The Lady of the Rivers (2011), about Jacquetta of Luxembourg
  - The Kingmaker's Daughter (2012), about Anne Neville
  - The White Princess (2013), about Elizabeth of York
- Rebecca Gablé, Das Spiel der Könige (translated: The Game of Kings) (2007), the third installment (1455–1485) of the Waringham series by the German author; Margaret ("Megan") Beaufort is one of the characters
- Livi Michael, Succession (2014), about Margaret of Anjou and Margaret Beaufort
- Paul C. Doherty, in the Margaret Beaufort series (in publication order):
  - Dark Queen Rising (2018)
  - Dark Queen Waiting (2019)
  - Dark Queen Watching (2021)
  - Dark Queen Wary (2023)

=== On screen ===
- Lady Margaret was portrayed by Marigold Sharman in eight of the 13 episodes of the BBC's Shadow of the Tower (1972), with James Maxwell as her son Henry VII.
- Channel 4 and RDF Media produced a drama about Perkin Warbeck for British television in 2005, Princes in the Tower. It was directed by Justin Hardy and starred Sally Edwards as Lady Margaret, opposite Paul Hilton as Henry VII, Mark Umbers as Warbeck, and Nadia Cameron Blakey as Elizabeth of York.
- In 2013, Amanda Hale portrayed Lady Margaret Beaufort in the television drama series, The White Queen, an adaptation of Gregory's novels, which was shown on BBC One, Starz, and VRT.
- In the 2017 series The White Princess (a follow-up to The White Queen), Margaret is portrayed by Michelle Fairley. She is portrayed later in life by Harriet Walter in 2019's The Spanish Princess, a follow-up to both The White Queen and The White Princess.
- Margaret is the main protagonist of the three-part 2021 series Royal Bastards: Rise of the Tudors, in which the story of the Wars of the Roses is dramatised and told from three viewpoints: the House of York, the House of Lancaster and Margaret herself. Margaret is portrayed by two actors (younger and older); Nina Marlin and Phoebe Sparrow.

=== In music ===
- In 2020, Renée Lamb portrayed Margaret Beaufort on the cast recording of A Mother's War, a musical based on the Wars of the Roses.

== See also ==
- Christopher Urswick – priest and confessor of Margaret Beaufort. Messenger between her and Henry Tudor in exile.
