= The Lady of the Rivers =

2011 novel by Philippa Gregory

- First UK edition cover
- Author: Philippa Gregory
- Audio read by: Bianca Amato
- Language: English
- Series: The Cousins' War
- Genre: Historical fiction
- Published: 2011
- Publisher: Simon & Schuster
- Publication place: United Kingdom
- Media type: Print (hardcover/paperback); Audiobook; E-book
- Pages: 512
- ISBN: 978-1-84737-459-2
- Preceded by: The Red Queen
- Followed by: The Kingmaker's Daughter

The Lady of the Rivers is a 2011 historical novel by Philippa Gregory, part of her series The Cousins' War. The story is narrated by Jacquetta of Luxembourg, mother of Elizabeth Woodville, and covers the reign of the Lancastrian King Henry VI. The novel serves as a prequel to Gregory's The White Queen (2009), the story of Elizabeth's reign as Queen consort of England.

== Plot ==
Fourteen-year-old Jacquetta, whose noble family claims descendance from the water goddess Melusine, learns the secrets of her inherited powers from her great-aunt Jehanne, the Demoiselle of Luxembourg. Jacquetta befriends Joan of Arc, who is a prisoner at her uncle's castle, but later watches in horror as Joan is burned at the stake by the English-backed church. Three years later at age 17, Jacquetta is given in marriage to John, Duke of Bedford, the uncle to King Henry VI and the English regent in France.

On their wedding night, however, the Duke explains that he wishes to keep her a virgin so that she may use the powers of her family in their purest form in his alchemical experiments seeking the ability to turn iron into gold. He later dies and leaves Jacquetta a wealthy widow at 20. She and the Duke's handsome squire Richard Woodville realize that they have fallen in love and become lovers. Returning to England, they marry in secret before the king can remarry her to someone else. Exiled from court in disgrace, Jacquetta and Richard soon have their first child, Elizabeth.

Once Jacquetta and Richard are forgiven and allowed back to court, the pair become close companions of the young king Henry VI and his new French bride Margaret of Anjou, a kinswoman of Jacquetta's. Soon after their marriage, however, the royal couple become increasingly unpopular and there are several uprisings. They rely heavily on the advice of favourites and lavish wealth and titles on them, including Richard and Jacquetta. Margaret becomes frustrated with her husband and when she eventually becomes pregnant, it is strongly implied that the baby has actually been fathered by Edmund Beaufort, 2nd Duke of Somerset. After the King slips into a coma, Jacquetta is a constant companion to the pregnant Queen and remains by her side for the next few years. When the King eventually awakens, the country is plunged into civil war between Lancaster and York led by Richard of York.

Margaret becomes Queen Militant and raises armies to fight in her husband's name, including an army of Scots to fight the Yorkists, which makes her even more unpopular with the people. A defeated Margaret is forced to flee to France, and Jacquetta returns to Grafton manor. A widowed Elizabeth also returns with her children, and petitions the new King Edward IV for the return of her lands. Jacquetta looks from the window of her house to see Elizabeth walking up with Edward, finishing where The White Queen begins.

== Critical reception ==
Publishers Weekly wrote of the novel, "Gregory portrays spirited women at odds with powerful men, endowing distant historical events with drama, and figures long dead or invented with real-life flaws and grand emotions." The review adds that the author "makes history (mostly accurate) come alive for readers (mostly women) by giving credence to persistent rumors that academic historians (mostly men) have brushed aside."

AudioFile magazine gave its Earphones Award to the audiobook recording of The Lady of the Rivers, calling the story "fabulous" and praising narrator Bianca Amato, noting that "Amato’s striking performance draws lifelike portraits from Gregory’s blend of research and imagination."
