= David Baldwin (historian) =

British historian, author, and former university lecturer

David Baldwin FRHistS (22 December 1946 (?) – 4 April 2016) was a British historian, author and university lecturer, who lived near Leicester, England.

Baldwin specialised in late Medieval history—"the great medieval families of the Midlands"—and wrote several books about the people and events of the Wars of the Roses. Before retiring from teaching, Baldwin had previously worked as a lecturer at both the University of Leicester and the University of Nottingham. In 1986, over 25 years before the 2012 excavation and the discovery of the king's body, he predicted that Richard III's remains would be found at Greyfriars, Leicester.

In his 2010 book, Robin Hood: The English Outlaw Unmasked, Baldwin argued that the 'real' Robin Hood was Roger Godberd, a disinherited supporter of Simon de Montfort. He drew attention to the many similarities between Godberd's career and the stories told of Robin in the earliest ballads, and to a grave slab in Loxley churchyard in Warwickshire which appeared to be identical to one associated with Robin in earlier centuries.

In his 2007 book, The Lost Prince: The Survival of Richard of York, Baldwin discussed the possibility that the younger of the Princes in the Tower, Prince Richard, survived, and was the "Richard Plantagenet" who died in December 1550 at Eastwell in Kent. Richard had worked as a bricklayer at St. John's Abbey, Colchester, until 1539, but, unusually for someone of his class, could read Latin. He is sometimes said to have been an illegitimate son of King Richard III.

Baldwin was elected a Fellow of the Royal Historical Society in 2012.

A religious man, Baldwin was a member of a Christadelphian congregation in Leicester.

== Works ==
Baldwin was the author of several books and contributed to a number of historical journals. In addition to teaching at Leicester and Nottingham Universities, he professionally lectured for societies and conferences.

- "King Richard's Grave in Leicester", Transactions of the Leicester Archaeological and Historical Society; Volume 60, (1986)
- Elizabeth Woodville, The History Press: 2004 – ISBN 0750938862
- The Kingmaker's Sisters: Six Powerful Women in the Wars of the Roses, The History Press: 2006 – ISBN 0750950765
- Stoke Field: The Last Battle of the Wars of the Roses, Pen and Sword Books: 2006 – ISBN 1844151662
- The Lost Prince: The Survival of Richard of York, The History Press: 2007 – ISBN 0750943351
- Robin Hood: The English Outlaw Unmasked, Amberley Publishing: 2010 – ISBN 1848683782
- Richard III, Amberley Publishing: 2012 – ISBN 9781445601823
- The Women of the Cousins' War: The Duchess, the Queen and the King's Mother, with Philippa Gregory and Michael Jones, Simon & Schuster:2012 – ISBN 1849833346
- The White Queen – What happened to the Princes in the Tower?, BBC History, 9 August 2013.
- Richard III. The Leicester Connection. Pitkin 2013. ISBN 9781841654485. New edition 2015, ISBN 9781841656212.
- Henry VIII's Last Love. The Extraordinary Life of Katherine Willoughby. Amberley Publidhing 2015. ISBN 9781841656212.
