= The White Queen (novel) =

2009 novel by Philippa Gregory

- First UK edition cover
- Author: Philippa Gregory
- Audio read by: Bianca Amato (abridged); Susan Lyons (unabridged)
- Language: English
- Series: The Cousins' War
- Genre: Historical fiction
- Publisher: Simon & Schuster
- Publication date: 18 August 2009
- Publication place: United Kingdom
- Media type: Print (hardcover/paperback); Audiobook; E-book
- Pages: 432
- ISBN: 978-1-84737-455-4
- Followed by: The Red Queen

The White Queen is a 2009 historical novel by Philippa Gregory, the first of her series The Cousins' War. It tells the story of Elizabeth Woodville, queen consort of King Edward IV of England. The 2013 BBC One television series The White Queen is a 10-part adaptation of Gregory's novels The White Queen, The Red Queen (2010) and The Kingmaker's Daughter (2012), and features Rebecca Ferguson as Elizabeth Woodville.

Gregory's 2011 novel The Lady of the Rivers is a prequel to The White Queen, narrated by Elizabeth's mother Jacquetta of Luxembourg.

== Plot ==
Young widow Lady Elizabeth Grey puts herself in the path of King Edward IV to seek his assistance in reclaiming her late husband's estate for her sons, but it is love at first sight for both of them. They marry in secret, which later puts Edward, Elizabeth and Elizabeth's entire family at odds with Richard Neville, 16th Earl of Warwick, who had helped place Edward on the throne while expecting to control the young king. Masterminded by Elizabeth's mother Jacquetta, an experienced courtier formerly allied with the ousted queen Margaret of Anjou, Edward and Elizabeth secure strategic marriages and positions for Elizabeth's siblings and other relatives to bolster Edward's power and alliances against Warwick.

Edward and Elizabeth have three daughters, and Warwick rebels, attempting to put Edward's malleable younger brother George, Duke of Clarence on the throne instead. Edward foils their plan and reconciles with Warwick and George to consolidate his power, but not before Warwick executes Elizabeth's father, Richard Woodville, Earl Rivers and brother, John Woodville. Elizabeth vows revenge.

Warwick marries his elder daughter Isabel to George and rebels again, luring Edward into an arranged uprising where he plans to kill Edward. The plot fails, and Warwick and George flee to France. Isabel gives birth during the journey, but the child dies. Warwick marries his second daughter Anne to Edward of Lancaster, son and heir to the deposed king Henry VI, to secure Warwick's new alliance with Henry's exiled queen, Margaret of Anjou. Warwick invades England. Caught off guard, Edward is forced to flee to Flanders with Elizabeth's brother Anthony. Warwick arrests Jacquetta on charges of witchcraft, but she is soon released on the orders of her old friend Margaret.

Jacquetta joins a pregnant Elizabeth and her children in sanctuary in Westminster Abbey, where they are left unmolested by Warwick. Elizabeth gives birth to Edward's son, also named Edward. Returning to England, Edward is reunited with George and first defeats the forces of Warwick, who is killed, and then Margaret's army. Her son Edward of Lancaster is killed on the battlefield, and Edward murders the captive simpleton Henry VI to end the Lancastrian claim to the throne once and for all.

England is at peace, but a covetous George continues his plotting to undermine Edward's rule. Their younger brother Richard marries the widowed Anne Neville, and disapproves of Edward's choice to broker peace with France, rather than fight for English holdings there. Isabel's death drives George over the edge, and his plots and slanders against Edward and Elizabeth result in his conviction for treason. Despite the protestations of their mother Cecily, Edward has George executed. Edward later dies himself, leaving his brother Richard as guardian to his surviving sons Edward and Richard despite Elizabeth's protestations.

Richard seizes young Edward from the custody of Elizabeth's brother Anthony, and from sanctuary Elizabeth eventually relinquishes to Richard a page boy posing as her younger son, whom she actually sends to Flanders to be raised in secret under an assumed name. Believing he has both of Edward's heirs under his control in the Tower of London, Richard has Edward and Elizabeth's marriage declared invalid, and accedes the throne himself as Richard III.

Meanwhile, Elizabeth plots with her brother-in-law and former ward, the Duke of Buckingham, and Margaret Beaufort, the mother of the exiled Lancastrian claimant Henry Tudor, to overthrow Richard and free the young princes in the Tower. They betroth Tudor to Elizabeth of York, Edward and Elizabeth's eldest daughter, in part to seek the support of Yorkists for Tudor's cause. The young princes vanish and are presumed murdered, and though Elizabeth has not forgiven Richard for his execution of her brother Anthony and her son Richard Grey, she suspects that Buckingham, Margaret and Henry are more likely responsible for the disappearance of the boys as part of their own plotting to wrest the throne from Richard.

Elizabeth leaves sanctuary and sends her older daughters to Richard's court as ladies-in-waiting to Queen Anne. Richard's and Anne's son Edward dies, followed by Anne herself. In the meantime, Richard and the younger Elizabeth have fallen in love, but he fears losing the support of the northern lords loyal to Anne's family if he marries Elizabeth right away. Henry Tudor's forces arrive in England.

== Critical reception ==
Publishers Weekly wrote of the novel, "Gregory earned her international reputation evoking sex, violence, love and betrayal among the Tudors; here she adds intimate relationships, political maneuvering and battlefield conflicts as well as some well-drawn supernatural elements." The review adds that the author "is especially poignant depicting Elizabeth in her later years" and that "she captures vividly the terrible inertia of war," but notes that the novel "may not be as fresh as earlier efforts." Maureen Waller of The Telegraph called the novel "entrancing" and its heroine "intriguing," adding that "Gregory is very good at describing the bitchiness of the women in this tale of dynastic rivalry."

The White Queen has been released in audiobook form in both abridged (performed by Bianca Amato) and unabridged (narrated by Susan Lyons) versions. AudioFile magazine wrote of the novel, "Gregory has become wildly popular in the U.S. It's easy to see why in her latest heady mix of history, romance, and political intrigue as she teases apart the tangled skeins of the War of the Roses." The magazine praised both recordings, calling Amato's performance "powerful and compellingly believable" and Lyon's voice "regal" and "self-possessed."

== Adaptations ==
- The White Queen (2013), drama directed by Colin Teague, James Kent and Jamie Payne, based on novels The White Queen, The Red Queen and The Kingmaker's Daughter
