= The Kingmaker's Daughter =

2012 novel by Philippa Gregory

- First UK edition cover
- Author: Philippa Gregory
- Audio read by: Bianca Amato
- Language: English
- Series: The Cousins' War
- Genre: Historical fiction
- Publisher: Simon & Schuster
- Publication date: 16 August 2012
- Publication place: United Kingdom
- Media type: Print (hardcover/paperback); Audiobook; E-book
- Pages: 448
- ISBN: 978-0-85720-746-3
- Preceded by: The Red Queen (Gregory novel)
- Followed by: The White Princess

The Kingmaker's Daughter is a 2012 historical novel by English writer Philippa Gregory, part of her series The Cousins' War. It is the story of Anne Neville, wife of Richard III of England. The 2013 BBC One television series The White Queen is a 10-part adaptation of Gregory's novels The White Queen (2009), The Red Queen (2010) and The Kingmaker's Daughter, and features Faye Marsay as Anne Neville.

== Plot ==
Richard Neville, 16th Earl of Warwick—called "The Kingmaker"—puts young Edward IV on the throne of England. But before Neville can arrange for one of his daughters to marry the new king, Edward marries Elizabeth Woodville in secret. As Neville begins losing his control of Edward, he plots to secure his daughters' futures.

Anne, his younger daughter, is married off to Edward, Prince of Wales. Following the deaths in battle of both her father and her husband, she is courted by the future King Richard III of England.

== Critical reception ==
Publishers Weekly wrote of the novel, "In addition to Gregory handling a complicated history, she convincingly details women’s lives in the 1400s and the competitive love between sisters."

AudioFile magazine gave its Earphones Award to the audiobook recording of The Kingmaker's Daughter, calling the novel "another fascinating perspective of the behind-the-scene machinations of the War of the Roses" and praising narrator Bianca Amato as "simply outstanding as Anne sheds her innocence."

== Adaptations ==
- The White Queen (2013), drama directed by Colin Teague, James Kent and Jamie Payne, based on novels The White Queen, The Red Queen and The Kingmaker's Daughter
