= The Red Queen (Gregory novel) =

2010 historical novel by Philippa Gregory

- First UK edition cover
- Author: Philippa Gregory
- Audio read by: Bianca Amato
- Language: English
- Series: The Cousins' War
- Genre: Historical fiction
- Publisher: Simon & Schuster
- Publication date: 2010
- Publication place: United Kingdom
- Media type: Print (hardcover/paperback); Audiobook; E-book
- Pages: 400
- ISBN: 978-1-84737-457-8
- Preceded by: The White Queen
- Followed by: The Kingmaker's Daughter

The Red Queen is a 2010 historical novel by Philippa Gregory, the second of her series The Cousins' War. It is the story of Margaret Beaufort, mother of Henry VII of England. The 2013 BBC One television series The White Queen is a 10-part adaptation of Gregory's novels The White Queen (2009), The Red Queen and The Kingmaker's Daughter (2012), and features Amanda Hale as Margaret Beaufort.

== Critical reception ==
Publishers Weekly noted of The Red Queen that "Gregory puts her many imitators to shame by dint of unequalled energy, focus, and unwavering execution."

AudioFile magazine gave its Earphones Award to the audiobook recording of the novel, calling Gregory "the queen of British historical fiction" and praising narrator Bianca Amato's performance as "regal and riveting".

== Adaptations ==
- The White Queen (2013), drama directed by Colin Teague, James Kent and Jamie Payne, based on novels The White Queen, The Red Queen and The Kingmaker's Daughter
