= AudioFile (magazine) =

Magazine that focuses on audiobooks

- Editor: Robin F. Whitten
- Categories: Literary magazine
- Frequency: Bimonthly
- Publisher: AudioFile Publications, Inc.
- Founded: 1992; 34 years ago
- Country: United States
- Based in: Portland, Maine
- Language: English
- Website: AudioFile
- ISSN: 1063-0244

AudioFile was a print and online magazine whose mission is to review "unabridged and abridged audiobooks, original audio programs, commentary, and dramatizations in the spoken-word format. The focus of reviews is the audio presentation, not the critique of the written material." AudioFile was published six times a year in Portland, Maine. In 2026, Kirkus Reviews bought AudioFile and began merging its features into the company's reviews coverage.

== Launch ==
The publication was launched in 1992 as a 12-page black & white newsletter containing about 50 critical reviews of audiobooks, focused on new releases. In 1997, it switched to a 36-page color magazine format containing about 60 reviews per issue and interviews with authors, readers, and publishers.

== Online ==
In 2000, AudioFile launched an online database of past issues. Current issues were offered online beginning in 2001. By 2026, the magazine had published over 60,000 reviews. AudioFile also began a weekly podcast, Behind the Mic.

In January 2026, Kirkus Reviews bought AudioFile, intending to merge it into an audiobook reviews section of the Kirkus Reviews website.

== Earphones Awards ==
AudioFile bestows monthly Earphones Awards as its equivalent to a to starred review for audio books. They given for works which are deemed to excel in the following criteria:

- Narrative voice and style
- Vocal characterizations
- Appropriateness for the audio format
- Enhancement of the text

== SYNC Audiobooks for Teens ==
AudioFile sponsored the SYNC Audiobooks for Teens, a "free summer program for teens 13+." The program discontinued in 2022. The program provided subscribers with two free and complete audiobook downloads paired thematically each week during its summer season. The season varied in length from 10 to 16 weeks. The audiobook files were delivered via the OverDrive Media Console.
