= The White Princess (miniseries) =

2017 British-American television series

- Based on: The White Princess & The King's Curse by Philippa Gregory
- Written by: Emma Frost; Sarah Dollard; Loren McLaughlan; Amy Roberts; Alice Nutter; Sarah Phelps
- Directed by: Jamie Payne; Alex Kalymnios
- Starring: Jodie Comer; Rebecca Benson; Jacob Collins-Levy; Kenneth Cranham; Essie Davis; Rossy de Palma; Richard Dillane; Anthony Flanagan; Patrick Gibson; Caroline Goodall; Amy Manson; Adrian Rawlins; Vincent Regan; Suki Waterhouse; Joanne Whalley; Andrew Whipp; Michelle Fairley
- Composer: John Lunn
- Countries of origin: United States; United Kingdom
- Original language: English
- No. of episodes: 8

Production
- Executive producers: Emma Frost; Jamie Payne; Colin Callender; Scott Huff; Michele Buck
- Producers: Lachlan MacKinnon; Rashida Acharya
- Cinematography: Chris Seager
- Editors: St. John O'Rorke; Anne Sopel; Jamie Trevill
- Running time: 60 minutes
- Production companies: Company Pictures; Playground Entertainment

Original release
- Network: Starz (US); U&Drama (UK)
- Release: 16 April – 4 June 2017

Related
- The White Queen; The Spanish Princess

The White Princess is a historical drama television miniseries developed for Starz. It is based on Philippa Gregory's 2013 novel of the same name and, to a lesser extent, its 2014 sequel The King's Curse. It is a sequel to the 2013 miniseries The White Queen, which adapted three of Gregory's previous novels, and begins immediately where The White Queen finished.

In the series, the marriage of Henry VII and Elizabeth of York effectively ends the Wars of the Roses by uniting the houses of Lancaster and York. However, their mutual enmity and distrust, as well as the political plots of their mothers, threaten to tear both the marriage and the kingdom apart.

== Cast and characters ==
=== Main ===
- Jodie Comer as Elizabeth "Lizzie" of York, the Queen of England from 1486–1503
- Jacob Collins-Levy as Henry VII, the King of England, Elizabeth's husband
- Michelle Fairley as Margaret Beaufort, the King's mother
- Rebecca Benson as Margaret "Maggie" Plantagenet, the Queen's paternal cousin, sister of Teddy
- Kenneth Cranham as Bishop (later Cardinal) John Morton, a confidant of the King's mother
- Essie Davis as Elizabeth Woodville, the Queen dowager
- Rossy de Palma as Isabella I of Castile, the Queen of Castile
- Richard Dillane as Thomas Stanley, Margaret Beaufort's husband
- Anthony Flanagan as Francis Lovell, a Yorkist supporter
- Patrick Gibson as Perkin Warbeck, a pretender to the English crown who claims to be Richard of York.
- Caroline Goodall as Cecily Neville, Duchess of York, the Queen's paternal grandmother. Goodall was the only actor to appear in both The White Queen and The White Princess.
- Amy Manson as Catherine "Cathy" Gordon, wife of Perkin Warbeck
- Adrian Rawlins as John de la Pole, Duke of Suffolk, husband of Eliza de la Pole
- Vincent Regan as Jasper Tudor, the King's uncle
- Suki Waterhouse as Cecily of York, the Queen's sister
- Joanne Whalley as Margaret, Duchess of Burgundy, the Queen's paternal aunt
- Andrew Whipp as Sir Richard Pole, husband of Maggie Plantagenet
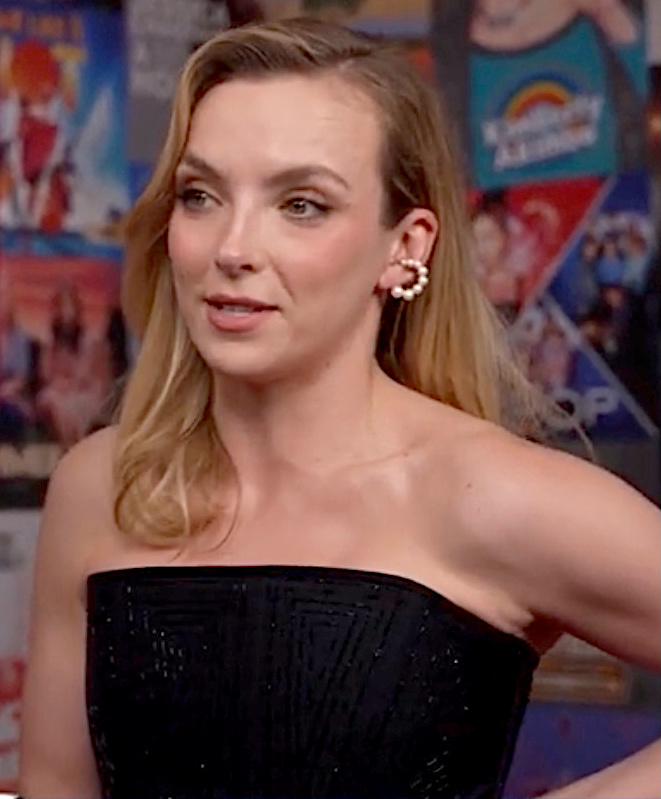
Jodie Comer portrays Elizabeth of York, the White Princess.

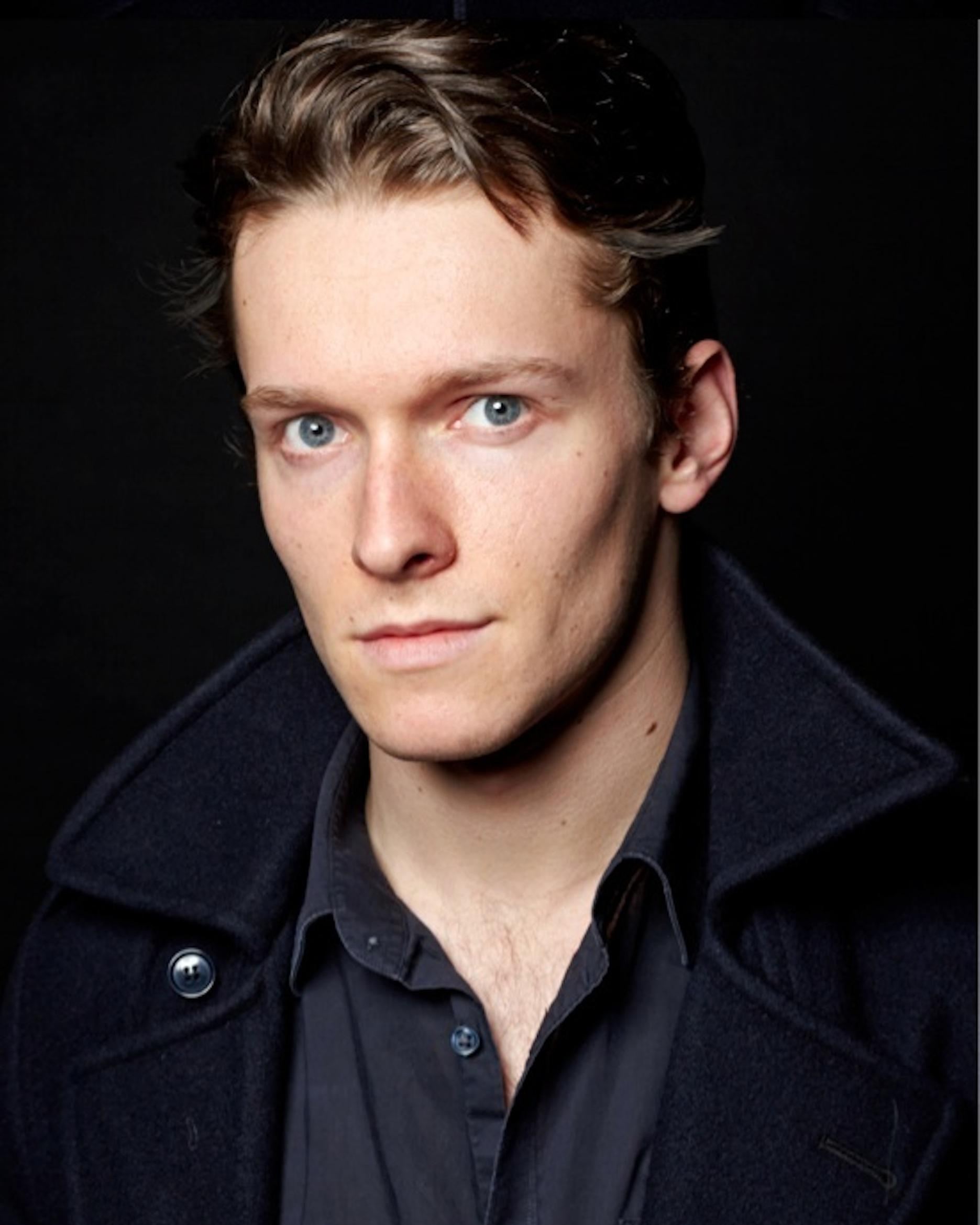
Jacob Collins-Levy portrays Henry VII.

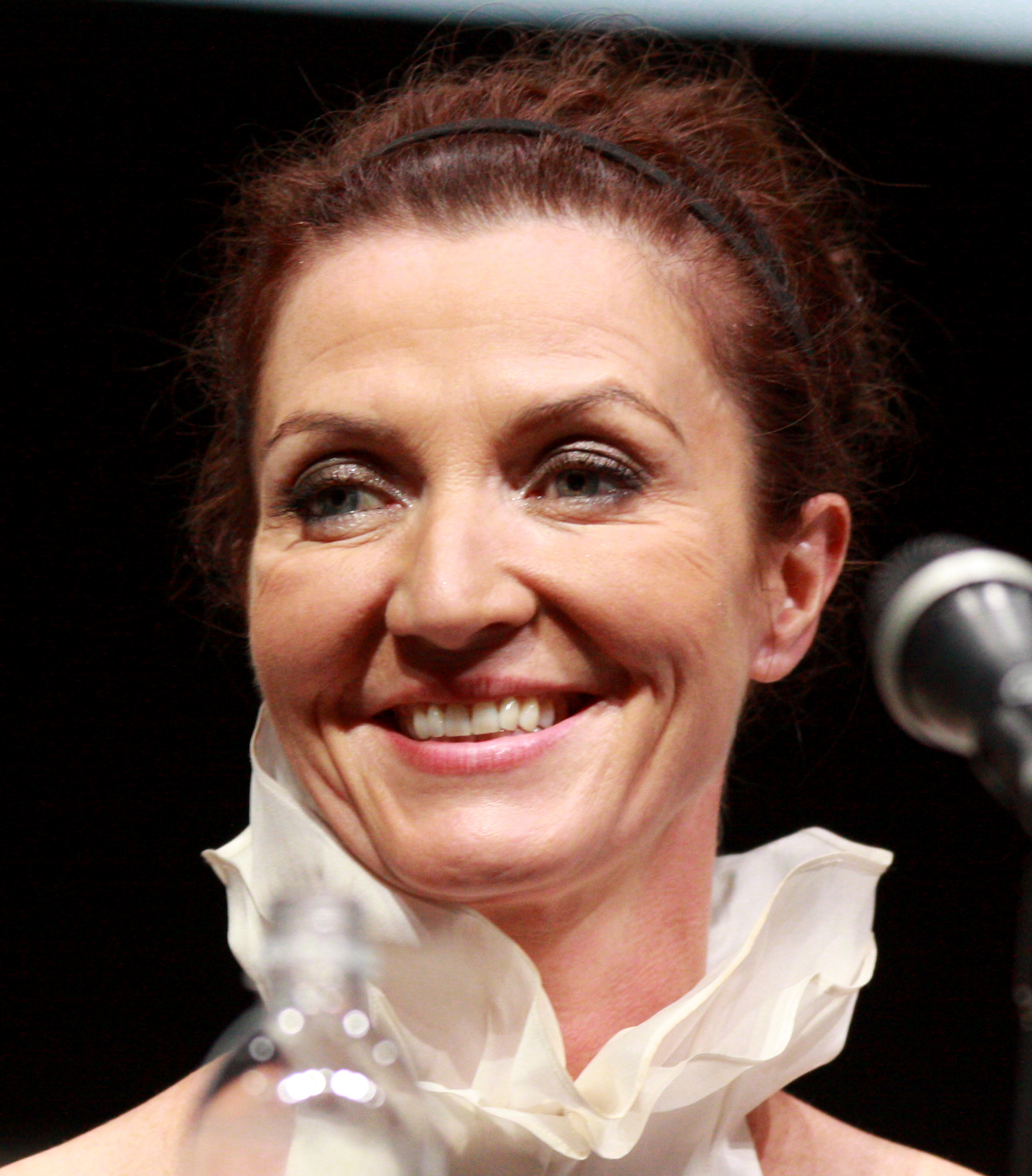
Michelle Fairley portrays Margaret Beaufort.

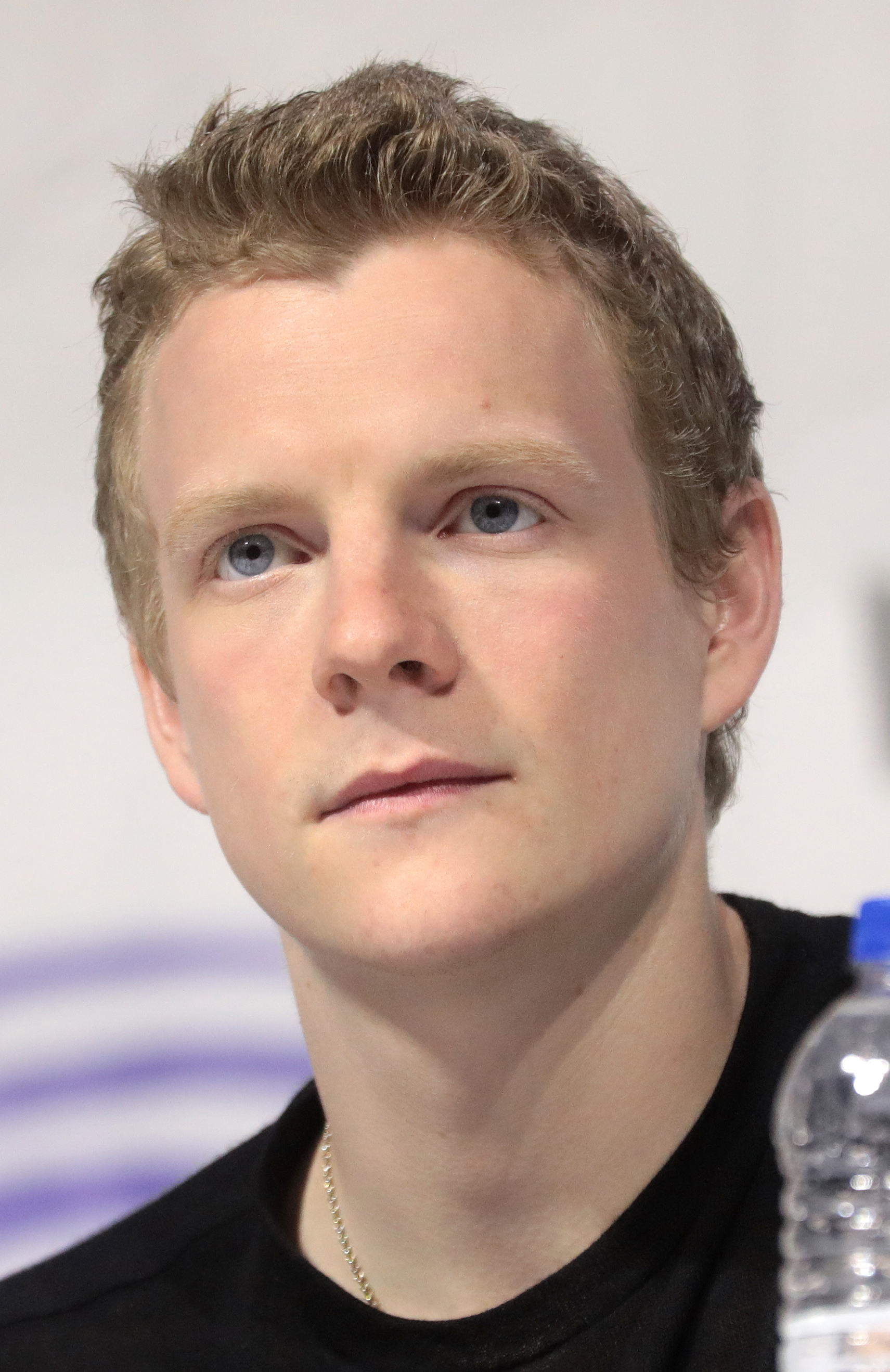
Patrick Gibson portrays Perkin Warbeck.

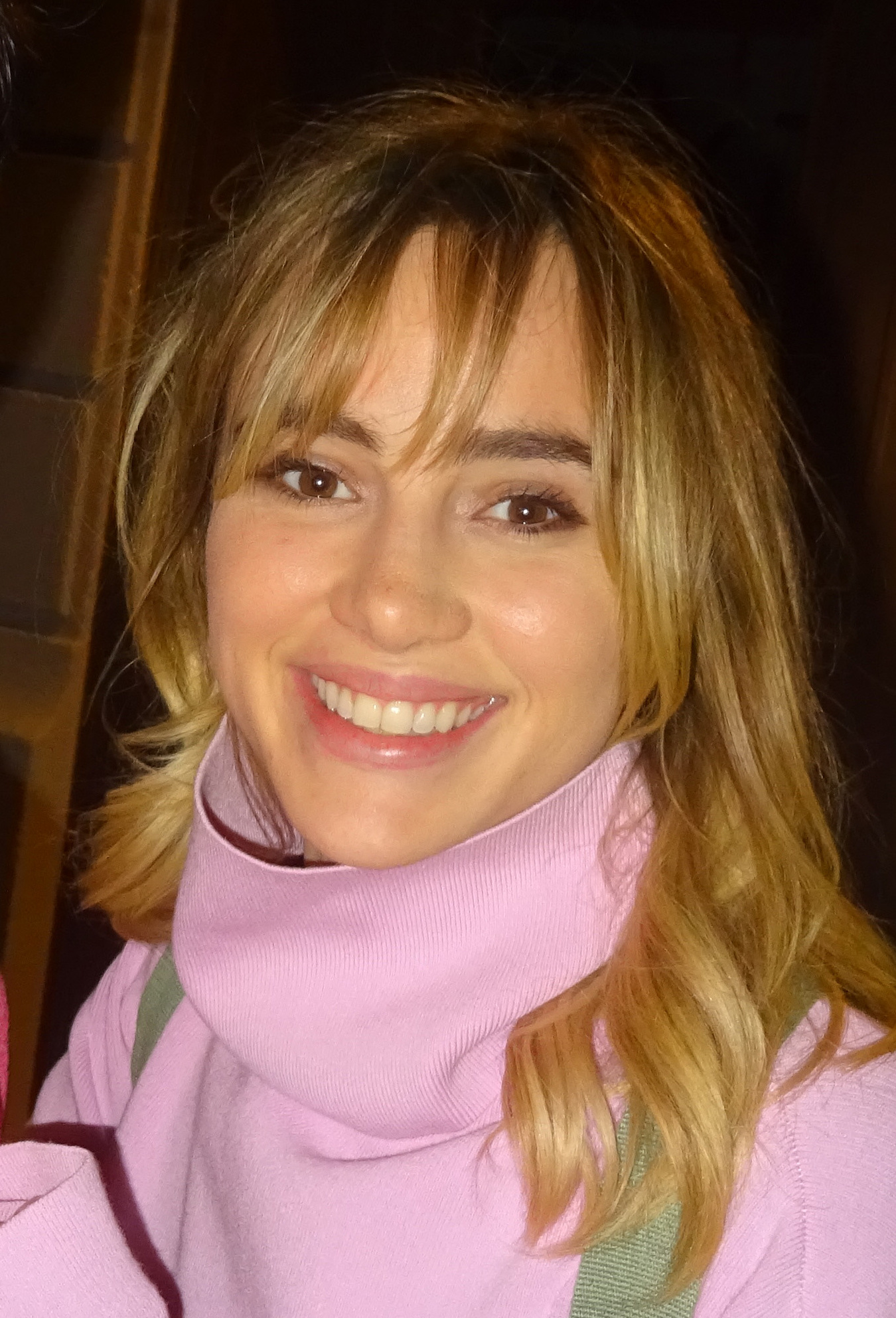
Suki Waterhouse portrays Cecily of York.

=== Recurring ===
- Nicholas Audsley as Lord Strange
- Rhys Connah (child) and Albert de Jongh (teen) as Edward "Teddy" Plantagenet, Earl of Warwick, the Queen's cousin, brother of Maggie
- Heidi Ely as Princess Bridget, the Queen's sister
- Oliver Hembrough as John de la Pole, Earl of Lincoln, the Duke of Suffolk's son
- Rosie Knightley as Princess Anne, the Queen's sister
- Ava Masters as Princess Catherine, the Queen's sister
- Rollo Skinner as Ned, a stable boy
- Susie Trayling as Elizabeth "Eliza" de la Pole, Duchess of Suffolk, the Queen's paternal aunt
- Guy Williams as William Stanley, Lord Thomas's brother
- Iain Batchelor as Maximilian I, Holy Roman Emperor
- Dorian Grover as Philip
- Zazie Hayhurst as Rettie
- Billy Barratt as Prince Arthur, the King's first son
- Woody Norman as Prince Harry, the King's second son
- Philip Arditti as Rodrigo de Puebla, the Spanish ambassador

=== Guest ===
- Ned Elliott as Prince Richard, the Queen's brother
- Luc Webb as Prince Edward, the Queen's brother
- Derek Frood as the Mayor of York
- Kitty Smith as Ruth
- Emmanuelle Bouaziz as Mary of Burgundy
- Max True as Lambert Simnel
- Nia Roberts as Catherine "Kate" Woodville, Duchess of Buckingham
- Norman Arthur Eshley as the Abbot
- Marc Danbury as the Priest
- Juan Echenique as Ferdinand II of Aragon, the King of Aragon
- Nicholas Gecks as the Wimborne Priest
- Alex Sawyer as Kofi, Novice Monk
- Mark Edel-Hunt as Thomas Wolsey
- Alasdair McLaughlin as Noah Luff

== Episodes ==
No.	Title	Directed by	Written by	Original release date	US viewers (millions)
1	"In Bed With The Enemy"	Jamie Payne	Emma Frost	April 16, 2017	0.633
22 August 1485 – 18 January 1486: Arriving triumphantly in London after defeating Richard III at the Battle of Bosworth, the new king Henry Tudor is compelled to wed Elizabeth of York—whom he despises due to her purported affair with Richard—to join the warring houses of Lancaster and York. Lizzie hates Henry as well, even more so when he insists on getting her pregnant before committing himself to marry her. Recognizing the influence over Henry that her new pregnancy gives her, Lizzie decides to play the part of dutiful wife as she and her mother, the former Queen consort Elizabeth, plot against the Tudors.
2	"Hearts and Minds"	Jamie Payne	Emma Frost	April 23, 2017	0.712
1486: Henry embarks on a tour of the kingdom to assert his sovereignty. Planning to accompany him to secretly rally York supporters, Lizzie's mother Elizabeth is instead neutralized by Henry's own mother Margaret Beaufort and locked up in Westminster Palace. Henry survives an assassination attempt by Yorkist Francis Lovell but suspects Lizzie's involvement; she recognizes it as her mother's handiwork, and denounces any intentions to actually kill Henry. In his absence, Lizzie wins favor with the common people by seizing funds from the royal treasury to aid those threatened by the sweating sickness. Though she is unable to convince Henry to free her young cousin Edward Plantagenet from the Tower of London, Lizzie reinforces Henry's growing attachment to her.
3	"Burgundy"	Jamie Payne	Emma Frost	April 30, 2017	0.784
September 1486: Lizzie gives birth to Prince Arthur, and finds common ground with Henry. Jasper Tudor visits Margaret of Burgundy, seeking an alliance, but peace negotiations are suddenly aborted by the death of Margaret's stepdaughter Mary. In the meantime, Henry's mother convinces him to imprison Lizzie's mother Elizabeth, but Lizzie sways him enough to have her moved to Bermondsey Abbey. Lizzie is crowned Queen of England. That night, Lizzie, unable to sleep, goes to Henry's, who also can't sleep, room and climbs into bed with him. Henry embraces her and they fall asleep in each other's arms.
4	"The Pretender"	Alex Kalymnios	Sarah Dollard & Emma Frost	May 7, 2017	0.845
1487: As plans are made to safely marry the York princesses to Tudor loyalists, Margaret of Burgundy raises an army behind a peasant boy she has declared is Teddy Plantagenet. Lizzie convinces Henry to release the real Teddy from the Tower and make a public display that he is reconciled with the Tudors. Margaret Beaufort, the King's Mother, arranges a crowd disturbance that sends Teddy back to the Tower as a threat to Henry's rule. Henry defeats the pretender's forces and shows mercy to the boy, putting him to work in the kitchens under the care of the castle servants. Although Margaret declares the Dowager Queen Elizabeth complicit in the conspiracy, Henry declines to execute his wife's mother. Henry then has his mother removed from the queen's bedchambers, so Elizabeth can move in. As they stand in Elizabeth's new rooms, Henry and Elizabeth kiss after promising each other that they will now be happy.
5	"Traitors"	Alex Kalymnios	Loren McLaughlan & Amy Roberts	May 14, 2017	0.951
1492–1495: Years have now passed, with Elizabeth and Henry's love and marriage strengthened to where they are truly happy with each other. Their family has now grown to include Prince Henry and Princess Mary and both are enjoying parenthood. Meanwhile, Margaret of Burgundy is rallying European support around a boy she recognizes as the true heir to the English throne, Lizzie's brother Richard Plantagenet, the Duke of York. Henry sends Lizzie's cousin Maggie, now Lady Pole, to prove that the boy is an impostor. Henry enobles his own second son Henry as the Duke of York, but Lizzie's mother, the Dowager Queen, interrupts the ceremony with a pronouncement that her son, the rightful King of England, is alive in Burgundy. Though partially convinced of Richard's authenticity, Maggie declares him an impostor when questioned by Henry. Jasper learns that Margaret Beaufort, the King's Mother, ordered the murders of the Princes in the Tower and is outraged; to preserve her secret, Margaret smothers a sick Jasper to death while he is in bed.
6	"English Blood on English Soil"	Alex Kalymnios	Emma Frost & Alice Nutter	May 21, 2017	0.792
1496: William Stanley is executed for his support for the pretender Perkin Warbeck, who with the help of a marriage with the Scottish noblewoman Catherine Gordon, is gaining the support of most European kingdoms except Spain. Lizzie and Henry travel to Spain to seek an alliance, but Queen Isabella of Castile refuses to help the king until his traitors are dealt with. After the death of the Dowager Queen Elizabeth, Lizzie inspires Henry's men to fight against the pretender, who ultimately finds sanctuary in a monastery. Warbeck is later retrieved by the King's Mother, who drags him to London pending Henry's reckoning.
7	"Two Kings"	Jamie Payne	Emma Frost	May 28, 2017	0.722
1496: Though Warbeck, his wife, and their son are prisoners, he refuses to renounce his claim to the throne. Maggie becomes an unlikely spy for her aunt, Margaret of Burgundy. Lizzie is convinced that Warbeck is her brother, but knows that his existence threatens her husband and sons. She starts a fire to allow him to escape, but he refuses.
8	"Old Curses"	Jamie Payne	Sarah Phelps	June 4, 2017	0.868
December 1496 Lizzie finally admits to Henry that she and her mother cursed her brothers' murderers; if Henry kills Warbeck—who she believes is Richard—he will visit the curse on their sons. Lizzie offers up an imposter to be executed in Warbeck's place, but Margaret of Burgundy is not fooled. Henry nearly strangles his mother as he realizes that she murdered the Princes in the Tower, cursing his bloodline. With the ruse discovered, Lizzie realizes that the only way to secure the alliance with Spain and assure her sons' futures is to allow her brother and Teddy to be executed. The King's Mother remarks to a furious Lizzie how alike they are.

== Production ==
=== Development ===
The 10-part 2013 television series The White Queen adapted Gregory's previous novels The White Queen (2009), The Red Queen (2010) and The Kingmaker's Daughter (2012). The series was broadcast on BBC One in the United Kingdom and on Starz in the United States, and features Freya Mavor as a young Elizabeth of York. Despite initial plans for a second series, on 20 August 2013 the BBC announced they were not commissioning one, possibly because of the lukewarm reception the series received.

However, in October 2013, The Telegraph reported that Starz was planning to develop a sequel miniseries called The White Princess, based on Gregory's novel. Starz CEO Chris Albrecht announced in January 2014 that the network was working with White Queen screenwriter Emma Frost on the project. Starz would produce the White Princess miniseries without involvement from the BBC. Gregory confirmed that the project was underway in August 2015. On 7 February 2016, Gregory announced on Facebook that the sequel was officially confirmed to be in production, with the scripts being written. The series was confirmed to be eight episodes in May 2016.

Jamie Payne, who directed three episodes of The White Queen, directed episodes 1, 2, 3, 7, and 8. Frost was the showrunner and executive producer. Lachlan MacKinnon is served as producer, with Gregory as executive producer. Playground's Colin Callender and Scott Huff also executive produced with Company Pictures' Michele Buck.

=== Casting ===
Jodie Comer was cast in the title role of Elizabeth of York in April 2016, with Michelle Fairley added as Margaret Beaufort in May. In June 2016, Starz announced the casting of Essie Davis as Dowager Queen Elizabeth, Jacob Collins-Levy as Henry VII, Suki Waterhouse as Cecily of York, Rebecca Benson as Margaret Plantagenet, and Joanne Whalley as Margaret, Duchess of Burgundy. The remaining cast includes Caroline Goodall as Duchess Cecily, Kenneth Cranham as Bishop Morton, Vincent Regan as Jasper Tudor and Rhys Connah as Teddy Plantagenet.

=== Filming ===
Principal photography began in June 2016, with locations including Bradford on Avon, Bristol, Berkeley Castle, Gloucester Cathedral, Lacock, Salisbury Cathedral, and Wells.

== Release ==
In early January 2017, the producers released a video clip from the series as a teaser trailer. In February 2017, Starz announced that The White Princess would premiere on 16 April 2017. In the UK the series began its satellite and terrestrial broadcasts on the U&Drama channel on 18 November 2017.

== Reception ==
The miniseries received generally favorable reviews. On Rotten Tomatoes, it has an approval rating of 76% based on reviews from 17 critics, with an average rating of 6.95/10. The website's critics consensus indicated the series was "well-acted and enlivened by its fresh perspective" and "delivers more than enough intrigue to satisfy fans of period British royal court drama." On Metacritic, the show has a weighted average score of 71 based on reviews from 9 critics.

== Continuation ==
On 15 March 2018, Starz announced that it will create a continuation of The White Queen and The White Princess to be titled The Spanish Princess, which will be based on Gregory's novels The Constant Princess and The King's Curse and center on Catherine of Aragon.
