= Philippa Gregory =

English historical novelist (born 1954)

Philippa Gregory CBE
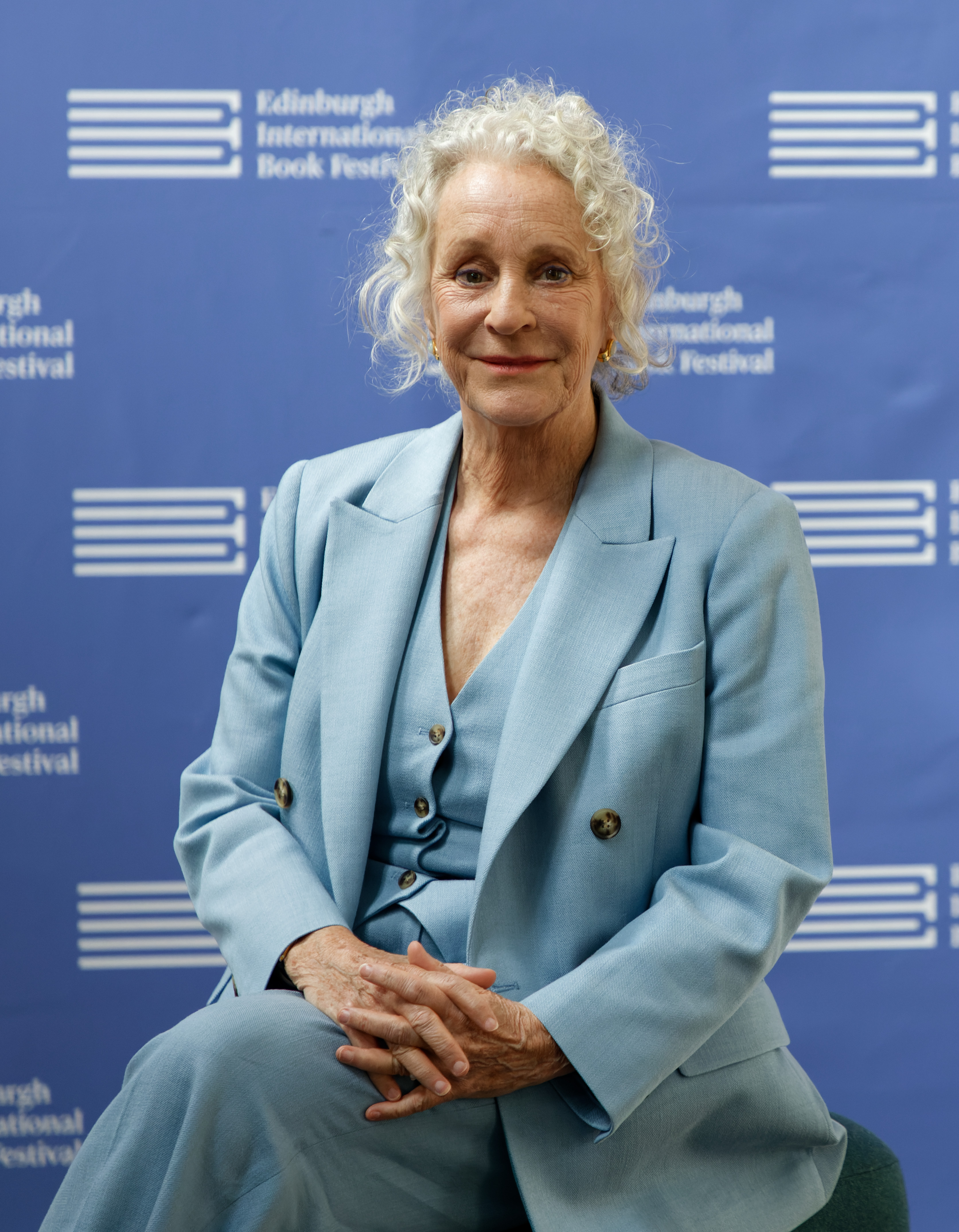
- Gregory at the 2024 Edinburgh International Book Festival
- Born: 9 January 1954 (age 72); Nairobi, Colony of Kenya
- Education: University of Sussex (B.A.); University of Edinburgh (Ph.D.)
- Occupation: Novelist
- Spouses: Peter Chislett (divorced); Paul Carter (divorced); Anthony Mason (divorced)
- Children: 2
- Writing career
- Language: English
- Period: 1987–present
- Genres: Historical fiction, romance, fantasy
- Notable awards: RoNA Award
- Philippa Gregory's voice Recorded June 2012 from the BBC Radio 4 programme Bookclub
- Website: www.philippagregory.com

Philippa Gregory (born 9 January 1954) is a Kenyan-born English historical novelist who has been publishing since 1987. The best known of her works is The Other Boleyn Girl (2001), which in 2002 won the Romantic Novel of the Year Award from the Romantic Novelists' Association and has been adapted into two films.

AudioFile magazine has called Gregory "the queen of British historical fiction".

== Early life and education ==
Philippa Gregory was born on 9 January 1954 in Nairobi, at that time serving as capital city of the Colony and Protectorate of Kenya (modern-day Republic of Kenya), the second daughter of Elaine (Wedd) and Arthur Percy Gregory, a radio operator and navigator for East African Airways. When she was two years old, her family moved to Bristol, UK.

She was a "rebel" at Colston's Girls' School where she obtained a B grade in English and two E grades in History and Geography at A-level. She then went to journalism college in Cardiff and spent a year as an apprentice with the Portsmouth News before she managed to gain a place on an English literature degree course at the University of Sussex, where she switched to a history course. In 1982, she received a B.A. degree in history from Sussex University.

She worked for BBC radio for two years before attending the University of Edinburgh, where she obtained a Ph.D. degree in 18th-century literature in 1985 for her thesis entitled The popular fiction of eighteenth-century commercial circulating libraries. Gregory has taught at the University of Durham, the University of Teesside, and the Open University, and was made a fellow of Kingston University in 1994.

== Career ==
=== Writing ===
She has written novels set in several different historical periods, though primarily the Tudor period and the 16th century. Reading a number of novels set in the 17th century led her to write the best-selling Lacey trilogy Wideacre, which is a story about the love of land and incest, The Favoured Child and Meridon. This was followed by The Wise Woman. A Respectable Trade, a novel of the slave trade in England, set in 18th-century Bristol, was adapted by Gregory for a four-part drama series for BBC television. Gregory's script was nominated for a BAFTA, won an award from the Committee for Racial Equality, and the film was shown worldwide.

Two novels about a gardening family are set during the English Civil War: Earthly Joys and Virgin Earth, while she has in addition written contemporary fiction – Perfectly Correct, Mrs Hartley and the Growth Centre, The Little House and Zelda's Cut. She has also written for children.

Some of her novels have won awards and have been adapted into television dramas. The most successful of her novels has been The Other Boleyn Girl, published in 2001 and adapted for BBC television in 2003 with Natascha McElhone, Jodhi May and Jared Harris. In the year of its publication, The Other Boleyn Girl also won the Romantic Novel of the Year and it has subsequently spawned sequels – The Queen's Fool, The Virgin's Lover, The Constant Princess, The Boleyn Inheritance, and The Other Queen. Miramax bought the film rights to The Other Boleyn Girl and released a film of the same name in February 2008 starring Eric Bana, Natalie Portman and Scarlett Johansson.

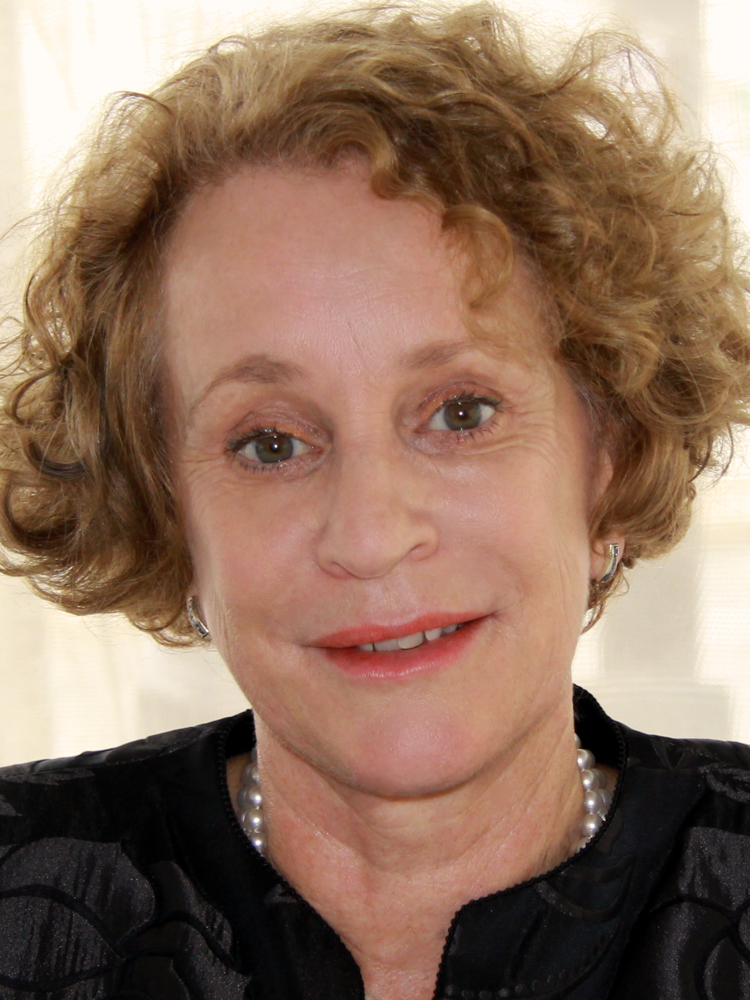
Gregory in 2011

Gregory has also published a series of books about the Plantagenets, the ruling houses that preceded the Tudors, and the Wars of the Roses. Her first book The White Queen, published in 2009, centres on the life of Elizabeth Woodville, the wife of Edward IV. The Red Queen, published in 2010, is about Margaret Beaufort the mother of Henry VII and grandmother to Henry VIII. The Lady of the Rivers (2011), is the life of Jacquetta of Luxembourg, mother of Elizabeth Woodville. The Kingmaker's Daughter, published in 2012, is about Anne Neville, the wife of Richard III, and The White Princess (2013) centres on the life of Elizabeth of York, wife of Henry VII and the mother of Henry VIII. The Last Tudor is a novel about Jane Grey and her sisters Katherine and Mary. The 2013 BBC One television series The White Queen is a 10-part adaptation of Gregory's novels The White Queen, The Red Queen and The Kingmaker's Daughter (2012).

In 2013, Helen Brown of The Telegraph wrote that "Gregory has made an impressive career out of breathing passionate, independent life into the historical noblewomen whose personalities had previously lain flat on family trees, remembered only as diplomatic currency and brood mares." She added: "Gregory’s historical fiction has always been entertainingly speculative (those tempted to sneer should note that she’s never claimed otherwise) and comes with lashings of romantic licence."

In 2011, she contributed a short story "Why Holly Berries are as Red as Roses" to an anthology supporting the Woodland Trust. The anthology Why Willows Weep has so far helped The Woodland Trust plant approximately 50,000 trees.

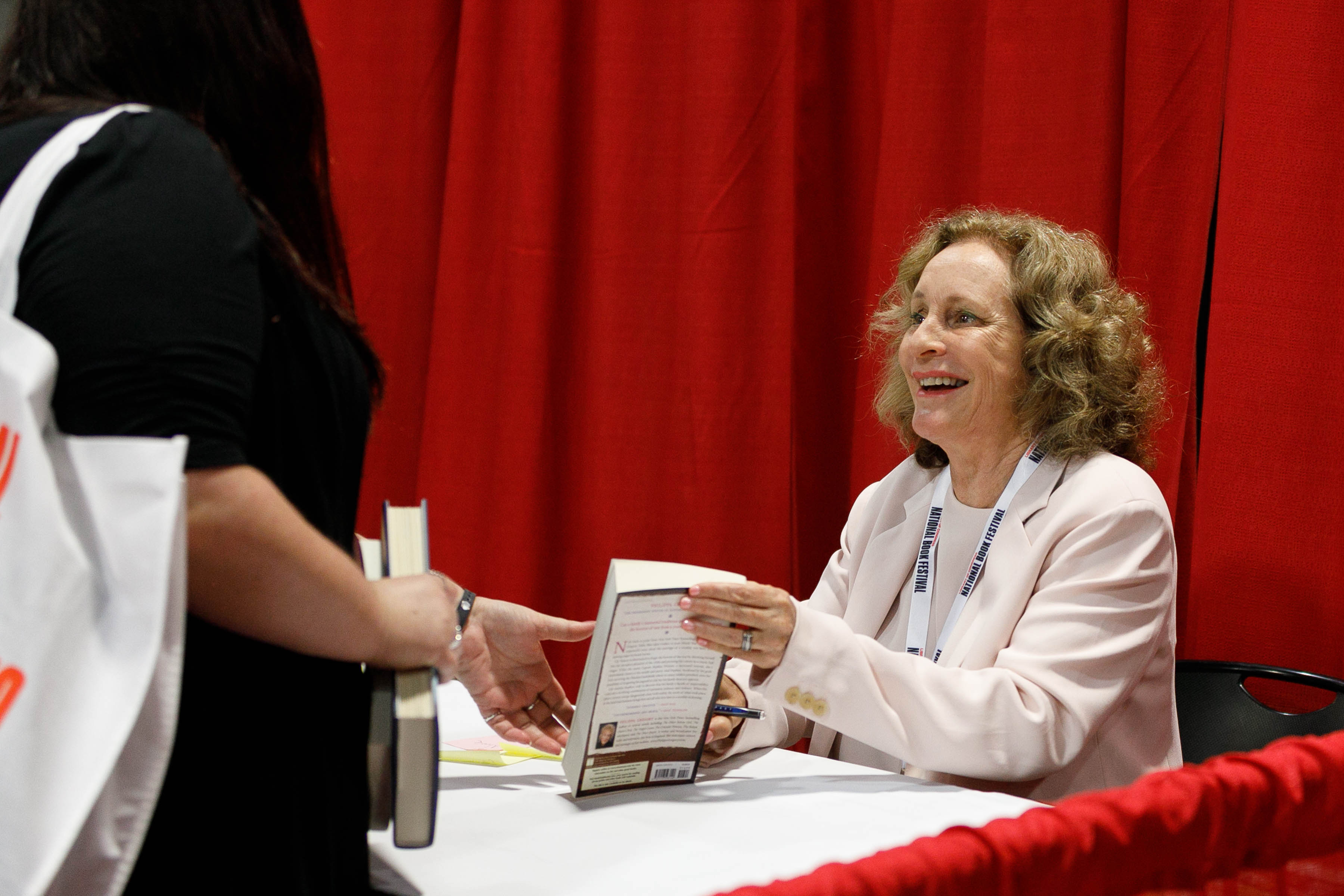
Gregory signs books at the 2019 National Book Festival

Gregory was appointed Commander of the Order of the British Empire (CBE) in the 2021 Birthday Honours for services to literature and to charity in the UK and the Gambia.

In 2023, Gregory published Normal Women, a Sunday Times bestselling non-fiction book on the lives of women in England for 900 years. Critically acclaimed, the book "radically reframes our national story" putting the lives of women in England from the Norman Conquest to the modern day onto the historical record. Normal Women was shortlisted for a Parliamentary Book Award in 2023 and best non-fiction narrative at the British Book Awards in 2024. Gregory also hosted a Normal Women podcast series, which was nominated for 'Best New Podcast' Aria in 2024. Gregory subsequently published an illustration version of Normal Women for teen readers.

In 2024, Gregory's play on Richard III, Richard, My Richard, was performed at Shakespeare North Playhouse and Theatre Royal, Bury St Edmunds.

==== Criticism of historical fiction ====
Gregory's novels are published as historical fiction, and include an author's note in each book about the difference between history and fiction in the book, and a suggested further reading list for readers who want to read more history. In an interview with The Times in 2017 Gregory described her books as a "gateway drug", adding that people start with her books and go on to study history.

Nevertheless, she has been criticised for what is perceived as the intentional blurring of the line between historical fact and artistic license in her various works. The controversial historian David Starkey told The Telegraph in 2013 that "we really should stop taking historical novelists seriously as historians", and described Gregory's work as "good Mills and Boon". Susan Bordo criticised Gregory's claims to historical accuracy as "self-deceptive and self-promoting chutzpah", and notes that it is not so much the many inaccuracies in her work as "Gregory's insistence on her meticulous adherence to history that most aggravates the scholars."

In her novel The Other Boleyn Girl, released in 2001, her portrayal of Henry VIII's second wife Anne Boleyn received criticism. The novel is written from Anne's sister Mary's point of view and depicts Anne as cold and ruthless, as well as implying that Mary may have believed the accusations that Anne committed adultery and incest with her brother, despite it being widely accepted that she was innocent of the charges. The novelist Robin Maxwell, who acknowledges that Gregory's books "brought many readers who otherwise wouldn’t have read historical fiction to our genre", refused to write a blurb for The Other Boleyn Girl, describing its characterisation of Anne as "vicious, unsupportable". David Loades, who was a historian of the Tudor era at the University of Wales, said of the book: "What is important is that the author should be honest, and not claim a historical basis which does not in fact exist. It would have been safer if Philippa Gregory had claimed to be writing fiction, because that is what she was doing."

Gregory's 2013 novel The White Princess and its 2017 television adaptation of the same name have been contentious for both portraying Elizabeth of York as having had a relationship with her uncle Richard III and suggesting that sex between Elizabeth and her eventual husband Henry VII, who was the unexpected victor at the Battle of Bosworth, taking the crown from Richard, may initially have been non-consensual. Gregory's source for the relationship between uncle and niece is the contemporaneous rumours of the period, but it is thought these may have been created by Richard's enemies. The author Samantha Wilcoxson stated in a review of the series on her own website: "I understand there are gaps to fill and interpretations to make, but making someone a rapist when there is no reason to believe that they ever were is defamation of the dead, not literary license."

== Philanthropy ==
Gregory runs a small charity building wells in school gardens in The Gambia. Gardens for The Gambia was established in 1993 when Gregory was in The Gambia, researching for her book A Respectable Trade.

Since then, the charity has dug almost 200 low technology, low budget and therefore easily maintained wells, which are on-stream and providing water to irrigate school and community gardens to provide meals for the poorest children and harvest a cash crop to buy school equipment, seeds and tools.

In addition to wells, the charity has piloted a successful bee-keeping scheme, funded feeding programmes and educational workshops in batik and pottery and is working with larger donors to install mechanical boreholes in some remote areas of the country where the water table is not accessible by digging alone.

Gregory was a patron of the UK Chagos Support Association, which supported the Chagos islanders in their legal disputes with the British government.

== Personal life ==
Gregory wrote her first novel Wideacre while completing her doctorate and lived during that time in a cottage on the Pennine Way with her first husband Peter Chislett, editor of the Hartlepool Mail, and their baby daughter. They divorced before the book was published.

In February 2026, she called for the abolition of the monarchy.

== Works ==
=== Novels ===
The Wideacre trilogy

1. Wideacre (1987)
2. The Favoured Child (1989)
3. Meridon (1990)

Tradescant series

1. Earthly Joys (1998)
2. Virgin Earth (1999)

The Plantagenet and Tudor novels

Previously separated as the Tudor Court and Cousins' War series, as of August 2016 Gregory lists these novels as one series, The Plantagenet and Tudor Novels.

1. The Other Boleyn Girl (2001)
2. The Queen's Fool (2003)
3. The Virgin's Lover (2004)
4. The Constant Princess (2005)
5. The Boleyn Inheritance (2006)
6. The Other Queen (2008)
7. The White Queen (2009)
8. The Red Queen (2010)
9. The Lady of the Rivers (2011)
10. The Kingmaker's Daughter (2012)
11. The White Princess (2013)
12. The King's Curse (2014)
13. The Taming of the Queen (2015)
14. Three Sisters, Three Queens (2016)
15. The Last Tudor (2017)
16. Boleyn Traitor (2025)
17. Royal Witch (2026)

Gregory has suggested a "reading order" for the series, based on the real-world chronology of historical figures and events.

1. Royal Witch (Eleanor Cobham)
2. The Lady of the Rivers (Jacquetta of Luxembourg)
3. The White Queen (Elizabeth Woodville)
4. The Red Queen (Margaret Beaufort)
5. The Kingmaker's Daughter (Anne Neville; featuring her sister Isabel)
6. The White Princess (Elizabeth of York)
7. The Constant Princess (Katherine of Aragon)
8. The King's Curse (Margaret Pole)
9. Three Sisters, Three Queens (Margaret Tudor, featuring Mary Tudor and Katherine of Aragon)
10. The Other Boleyn Girl (Mary and Anne Boleyn)
11. Boleyn Traitor (Jane Boleyn, featuring Thomas Cromwell, Anne Boleyn, Jane Seymour, Anne of Cleves and Katherine Howard)
12. The Boleyn Inheritance (Jane Boleyn, Anne of Cleves and Katherine Howard)
13. The Taming of the Queen (Kateryn Parr)
14. The Queen's Fool (A young Jewish girl's story of her service in the courts of Edward VI, Mary I and Elizabeth I)
15. The Last Tudor (Jane, Katherine and Mary Grey)
16. The Virgin's Lover (Elizabeth I, Robert Dudley and Amy Robsart)
17. The Other Queen (Mary, Queen of Scots, George Talbot and Bess of Hardwick)

The Order of Darkness series

1. Changeling (2012)
2. Stormbringers (2013)
3. Fools' Gold (2014)
4. Dark Tracks (2018)

Fairmile series

1. Tidelands (2019)
2. Dark Tides (2020)
3. Dawnlands (2022)

Stand-alones

- Mrs. Hartley and the Growth Centre, or Alice Hartley's Happiness (1992)
- The Wise Woman (1992)
  A young girl forced out of her nunnery and into the real world during the reformation during Anne Boleyn's time of being queen.
- Fallen Skies (1994)
- A Respectable Trade (1995)
- Perfectly Correct (1996)
- The Little House (1998)
- Zelda's Cut (2000)

=== Short stories ===
Collections:

- Bread and Chocolate (2000)

=== Children's books ===
Princess Florizella series (picture books):

1. Princess Florizella (1988)
2. Florizella and the Wolves (1991)
3. Florizella and the Giant (1992)

Stand-alones:

- Diggory and the Boa Conductor (1996), picture book
- The Little Pet Dragon (1997), picture book
- A Pirate Story (1999), picture book

=== Plays ===
- Richard, My Richard (2024)

=== Non-fiction ===
- The Women of the Cousins' War: The Duchess, the Queen and the King's Mother (2011), with David Baldwin and Michael Jones, history
- "Early Women Writers" in The Women Writers Handbook. Aurora Metro Books. 2020. ISBN 971912430338
- Normal Women – 900 Years of Making History. HarperCollins. 2023. ISBN 9780008601706.

== Adaptations ==
- A Respectable Trade (1998), drama directed by Suri Krishnamma, based on novel A Respectable Trade
- The Other Boleyn Girl (2003), telefilm directed by Philippa Lowthorpe, based on novel The Other Boleyn Girl
- The Other Boleyn Girl (2008), film directed by Justin Chadwick, based on novel The Other Boleyn Girl
- The Little House (2010), miniseries directed by Jamie Payne, based on novel The Little House
- The White Queen (2013), drama directed by Colin Teague, James Kent and Jamie Payne, based on novels The White Queen, The Red Queen and The Kingmaker's Daughter
- The White Princess (2017), miniseries directed by Jamie Payne and Alex Kalymnios, based on novel The White Princess
- The Spanish Princess (2019–2020), series directed by Birgitte Stærmose, Daina Reid, Lisa Clarke, Stephen Woolfenden, Chanya Button and Rebecca Gatward, based on novels The Constant Princess and The King's Curse
