= The King's Curse =

2014 novel by Philippa Gregory

- First UK edition cover
- Author: Philippa Gregory
- Audio read by: Bianca Amato
- Language: English
- Series: The Cousins' War
- Genre: Historical fiction
- Publisher: Simon & Schuster
- Publication date: 14 August 2014
- Publication place: United Kingdom
- Media type: Print (hardcover/paperback); Audiobook; E-book
- Pages: 608
- ISBN: 978-0-85720-756-2
- Preceded by: The White Princess

The King's Curse is a 2014 historical novel by Philippa Gregory, part of her series The Cousins' War. A direct sequel to The White Princess, it follows the adult life of Margaret Pole, Countess of Salisbury, the daughter of George Plantagenet, 1st Duke of Clarence and Isabel Neville.

== Plot ==
Since Henry Tudor's accession to the English throne as Henry VII, Margaret Plantagenet has had to distance herself from her connection to the former royal family to survive. Married to a minor Tudor knight, she now mourns her younger brother, Edward, a potential claimant to the throne who has been executed by Henry on false charges of treason after 14 years imprisoned in the Tower of London. Margaret and her husband, Sir Richard Pole, manage the household of teenage Arthur, Prince of Wales, Henry's son and heir by his queen Elizabeth of York, Margaret's Plantagenet first cousin. Margaret makes fast friends with Arthur's new young bride, the Spanish princess Katherine of Aragon, but Arthur's sudden death leaves both women on uncertain ground.

Commanded by Arthur on his deathbed to marry his young brother Henry and someday become queen, Katherine asserts publicly that their marriage was never consummated. With Elizabeth now dead, King Henry considers preserving the alliance with Spain by marrying Katherine himself; his imperious mother Margaret Beaufort believes Katherine is lying, and fiercely opposes this therefore sinful marriage to her son or grandson. Richard's death leaves Margaret with five young children and a dwindling income. The King's Mother offers to relieve her burdens in exchange for a statement contradicting Katherine, but Margaret remains loyal. She is forced to foster her two oldest sons with a cousin, place her third son in Sheen Priory, and take her daughter and infant son with her to live in Syon Abbey.

Prince Henry succeeds his father as Henry VIII, and immediately marries Katherine. Margaret's maternal family fortunes and titles are restored to her, making her Countess of Salisbury in her own right. Her eldest son Henry Pole, 1st Baron Montagu, becomes a friend and confidante of the young king, and her son Reginald is sent to Oxford to become a scholar for the king. Margaret sets to make advantageous marriages for all of her children. Katherine loses several children before giving birth to Princess Mary, to whom Margaret is named governess. The execution for treason of their cousin Edward Stafford, 3rd Duke of Buckingham puts Margaret and her family in danger, but the scandal blows over. Margaret's son Arthur dies. Not having a legitimate male heir, Henry seeks to somehow put Katherine aside and marry the courtier Anne Boleyn; refused any such dispensation by the pope, Henry ultimately declares himself head of the Church of England, proclaims his marriage to Katherine invalid, and Mary illegitimate. Though scandalized, Margaret, her family, and everyone in England is compelled to swear an oath asserting Henry's right to do so; anyone who does not swear is executed.

Thomas Cromwell has begun a systematic dissolution of the monasteries in Henry's name, which causes increasing unrest among the common people. It has become a treasonous crime to disagree with the king, and even after Katherine's death, Margaret and her relations must hide their support for Mary and the Catholic Church. Henry has fathered only a daughter, Elizabeth, with Anne, and the vindictive greed of the Boleyns has left them with few allies. When Henry decides on a new consort, Jane Seymour, Anne is executed for adultery, and Elizabeth is also declared illegitimate. Henry is devastated when his illegitimate son Henry FitzRoy dies, but Jane finally gives him a legitimate son. Meanwhile, in self-imposed exile, Reginald has made an enemy of the king by writing and acting against Henry's split from papal authority. Margaret and her sons distance themselves from Reginald's disloyalty, but Cromwell focuses his attentions on them. Soon Margaret's youngest son Geoffrey has been arrested, and implicates Montagu, their cousins Henry Courtenay, Edward Neville, and others in seditious conversations going back years. Despite a lack of concrete evidence, all but Geoffrey are beheaded. Though protesting her innocence of any wrongdoing, Margaret is stripped of her fortune, imprisoned in the Tower of London, and attainted. Though Cromwell himself is executed for treason in the meantime, after two years in the Tower, Margaret is beheaded.

== Critical reception ==
Publishers Weekly called The King's Curse "carefully researched" and "an illuminating portrait" of Margaret Pole, adding that "Gregory moves confidently through a tangle of intrigue, revenge, and tyranny toward a shocking betrayal that brings Margaret face-to-face with the king’s ire."

AudioFile magazine gave its Earphones Award to the audiobook recording of The King's Curse, noting Gregory's "steady grasp of history" and praising narrator Bianca Amato's performance.

== Adaptations ==
- The Spanish Princess (2019-2020), series directed by Birgitte Stærmose, Daina Reid, Lisa Clarke, Stephen Woolfenden, Chanya Button and Rebecca Gatward, based on novels The Constant Princess and The King's Curse
