= Nadia Parkes =

English actress

- Born: Nadia Sofia Parkes; 31 December 1995 (age 30)
- Education: London Academy of Music and Dramatic Art
- Occupation: Actress
- Years active: 2019–present
- Known for: Kidnapped: The Chloe Ayling Story; The Spanish Princess; The Haunting of Villa Diodati; The Bastard Son & The Devil Himself

Nadia Sofia Parkes (born 31 December 1995) is an English actress. She is known for her roles in the Starz series The Spanish Princess (2019–2020), the Sky Atlantic series Domina (2021), and the Netflix series The Bastard Son & The Devil Himself (2022) as well as the lead role in Kidnapped: The Chloe Ayling Story (2024).

== Early life ==
Parkes grew up in Leamington Spa. She attended The King's High School for Girls. She went on to train at the London Academy of Music and Dramatic Art (LAMDA), graduating in 2018.

== Career ==
Parkes began her career when she was cast as Rosa, one of Catherine of Aragon’s trusted ladies-in-waiting, in the Starz limited series The Spanish Princess. In 2019, she was cast as young Livia in the Sky Atlantic limited series Domina.

Parkes portrayed the character Suzy in British Christmas comedy ensemble film This Is Christmas. She also had guest roles in the BBC television shows Doctor Who (episode The Haunting of Villa Diodati) and romantic comedy series Starstruck. Parkes had a lead role in The Bastard Son & The Devil Himself (2022) for Netflix. She portrayed the eponymous kidnapped model in BBC true-crime drama series Kidnapped: The Chloe Ayling Story (2024). On Stage the following year, she appeared at the Donmar Warehouse in Mike Bartlett play Juniper Blood. She portrayed a troubled archaeologist in the opening episode of rebooted detective series Lynley.

In 2026, she could be seen in crime drama series Hit Point, and portraying as a conniving university campus journalist in British romantic comedy Finding Emily. She portrayed Cara in HBO comedy drama series Youth (2026) alongside Sharon Horgan and Aran Murphy.

== Filmography ==
Film roles
Year	Title	Role	Notes
2022	This Is Christmas	Suzy	
2024	Salt	Georgie	Short film
2026	Finding Emily	Laura Lewis	

Television roles
Year	Title	Role	Notes
2019–2020	The Spanish Princess	Rosa de Vargas	Main role. Series 1 & 2; 9 episodes
2020	Doctor Who	Claire Clairmont	Series 12; Episode 8: "The Haunting of Villa Diodati"
2021	Starstruck	Sophie Diller	Series 1; Episodes 4 & 5: "Autumn" and "Winter"
2021	Domina	Young Livia	Series 1; Episodes 1 & 2: "Fall" and "Rise"
2022	The Bastard Son & The Devil Himself	Annalise	Main role. Episodes 1–8
2024	Tokyo Vice	Claudine	Series 2; Episode 2: "By My Number One"
2024	Kidnapped: The Chloe Ayling Story	Chloe Ayling	Lead role. Episodes 1–6
2025	Lynley	Sofia	Episode 1
2026	Hit Point	Sophia	
