= Three Sisters, Three Queens =

2016 historical novel by Philippa Gregory

- First edition
- Author: Philippa Gregory
- Language: English
- Series: Tudor Series
- Genre: Historical novel
- Publisher: Simon & Schuster
- Publication date: 9 August 2016
- Publication place: United Kingdom
- Pages: 560
- ISBN: 978-1-4767-5857-2
- Preceded by: The Taming of the Queen
- Followed by: The Last Tudor

Three Sisters, Three Queens is a historical novel by British author Philippa Gregory, published on 9 August 2016. It tells the stories of Margaret Tudor, Mary Tudor and Catherine of Aragon, three sisters (one of whom was an in-law), who became the queens of Scotland, France, and England, respectively.
