= The Constant Princess =

2005 historical novel by Philippa Gregory

- First UK edition
- Author: Philippa Gregory
- Language: English
- Series: Tudor Series
- Genre: Novel
- Publisher: HarperCollins UK; Touchstone Books (US)
- Publication date: 2005
- Publication place: United Kingdom
- Media type: Print (Hardback & Paperback)
- Pages: 400
- ISBN: 0-7432-7248-X (hardcover edition)
- Preceded by: -
- Followed by: The Other Boleyn Girl

The Constant Princess is a historical fiction novel by Philippa Gregory, published in 2005. The novel depicts a highly fictionalized version of the life of Catherine of Aragon and her rise to power in England.

The novel covers the period from Catherine's arranged marriage to Arthur, Prince of Wales to Catherine's rivalry with Anne Boleyn over the position of Queen consort of England. Other historical figures depicted in the novel include Henry VII of England, Henry VIII, Elizabeth of York, Lady Margaret Beaufort, Isabella I of Castille, Ferdinand II of Aragon, Joanna of Castile, Henry, Duke of Cornwall, and Mary I of England.

== Plot summary ==
Catherine of Aragon's arranged marriage to the English crown prince Arthur secretly develops into a loving relationship where they share plans to rule England side-by-side. However, Arthur succumbs to the sweating sickness three months into their marriage. In his deathbed, he convinces Catalina to deny consummating their marriage so she can still be considered a virgin and eligible to marry his younger brother Harry to carry out their plans. Arthur's father, King Henry VII, desires Catalina and refuses to betroth her to Harry. After the death of Queen Elizabeth, Henry offers his own hand in marriage. Catalina accepts, but later insists on marrying Harry as she realizes the duties of a queen will go to Henry's mother Lady Margaret Beaufort and her only role will be to bear Henry's children (who will be behind Harry in the line of succession). She pressures Henry to betroth her to Harry, which he eventually allows.

Years after her betrothal, Catalina and her retinue live in poverty as Henry refuses to sponsor her until her parents, Queen Isabella and King Ferdinand, pay the second half of her dowry while her parents believe the English crown should pay for Arthur's widow. After Isabella's death, Catalina hears rumors that Henry set aside her betrothal years ago and is arranging a marriage between his children and the children of Catalina's sister Joanna of Castile. Catalina's father commands the Spanish ambassador to return the dowry he had sent, but makes no mention of saving Catalina. Fortunately, Catalina's prospects improve when Henry dies of sickness and Harry marries her despite his father's warnings. Catalina is restored to a position of wealth and respect and manipulates Harry to remove Margaret's power in court so she can act as queen. They are crowned King Henry and Queen Katherine.

Catalina's first pregnancy isolates her for months until she comes to accept that the fetus was miscarried. Upon her return to court, she eventually realizes that the news of a scandal between two courtiers was actually a cover-up for Harry taking a new mistress during Catalina's lying-in. Harry's mistress, a verified virgin, leads Harry to question Catalina's virginity as she acted differently on their marriage bed, but Catalina lies and they reconcile. Their second child, Henry, is made Duke of Cornwall, but his death two months later strains their marriage. Catalina begins to see Harry as childish and demanding, and manipulates him to make her Spanish Ambassador and unites him with her father to invade France together. During his absence, the Scots declare war on England and Catalina successfully leads the English army to victory when the Scots attempt to invade England. She sends Harry a cryptic message hinting at another pregnancy.

Years pass, and Catalina admits to herself that her actions are for her own interests as much as Arthur's. Out of all of Catalina's children, only Princess Mary survived, leaving the fate of England unstable. Harry had more mistresses, all of whom she tolerated quietly as Harry eventually grew bored of them all and were never a threat to her. But his latest mistress, Anne Boleyn, is the most ambitious and is trying to take her spot as queen. Catalina vows to keep her promise to Arthur and proudly decides to fight for her right as queen. The novel ends, with Katherine entering a court hearing about her marriage to Harry.

== Reception ==
In reviewing the book, Publishers Weekly summarized the book as: "Gregory's skill for creating suspense pulls the reader along despite the historical novel's foregone conclusion." The Historical Novel Society review wrote: "The facts are well known, but the way that Gregory tells the story is a wonder."

In a 2005 book review in Kirkus Reviews noted the history and "how Gregory fills in the gaps is pure romantic fiction." The review summarized; "Gregory makes the broad sweep of history vibrant and intimate—and hinges it all on a bit of romance."

== Adaptations ==
- The Spanish Princess (2019-2020), series directed by Birgitte Stærmose, Daina Reid, Lisa Clarke, Stephen Woolfenden, Chanya Button and Rebecca Gatward, based on novels The Constant Princess and The King's Curse
