= This Is Christmas (film) =

2022 film by Chris Foggin

- Release poster
- Directed by: Chris Foggin
- Written by: Alastair Galbraith
- Produced by: Allan Niblo
- Starring: Alfred Enoch; Kaya Scodelario; Nadia Parkes; Timothy Spall; Ben Miller; Jeremy Irvine; Alexandra Roach; Joanna Scanlan; Sarah Niles
- Cinematography: Hannah Purdy Foggin
- Edited by: Martina Zamolo
- Music by: Christian Henson
- Production company: Vertigo Films
- Distributed by: Sky Cinema
- Release date: 9 December 2022
- Running time: 111 minutes
- Country: United Kingdom
- Language: English

This Is Christmas (also known as This Christmas) is a 2022 British Christmas romantic comedy film directed by Chris Foggin and written by Alastair Galbraith. The film stars an ensemble cast including Alfred Enoch, Kaya Scodelario, Nadia Parkes, Timothy Spall, Ben Miller, Sarah Niles, Jeremy Irvine, Alexandra Roach and Joanna Scanlan.

== Premise ==
Emma and Adam both commute in silence to London each day. One day, Adam invites the whole carriage of regular commuters to hold their own Christmas party.

== Cast ==
- Alfred Enoch as Adam
- Kaya Scodelario as Emma
- Nadia Parkes as Suzy
- Timothy Spall as Ray
- Ben Miller as Jonathan
- Jack Donoghue as Dean
- Jeremy Irvine as Simon
- Alexandra Roach as Amanda
- Joanna Scanlan as Linda
- Sarah Niles as Judith
- Clinton Liberty as Michael
- Robert Emms as Paul
- Steve Oram as conductor
- Laura Aikman as Polly
- Rebecca Root as Miranda
- Virginia Thompson as Fay

== Production ==
Filming took place in 2022 in London and Hertfordshire. Despite the Christmas theme and costumes the first week of filming took place in a heatwave with temperatures over 40 °C (104 °F).

== Release ==
This Is Christmas was released in the United Kingdom on Sky Cinema and Now on 9 December 2022. In the United States, the film was released on Epix.

== Reception ==
Gabriella Geisinger of Digital Spy described it as "2022's best festive film" with "just enough sugary sweetness, coupled with a hint of sombreness, and – of course – a happy ending to make it a perfect Christmas movie."

== See also ==
- List of Christmas films
