= Ossian Perret =

French-British actor

- Born: Chartres, France
- Education: Drama Centre London
- Years active: 2019–present

Ossian Perret is a French-British actor. He is known for his role in the fourth and fifth series of the Netflix medieval drama The Last Kingdom.

== Early life ==
Perret was born in Chartres, France to a British mother and a French father. He attended the International School of Berne, Switzerland. He completed a year-long foundation course at the Guildford School of Acting in 2015 before going on to graduate in 2018 from the Drama Centre London with a Bachelor of Arts in Acting.

== Career ==
Perret made his television debut in 2019 when he played Corin in the Swedish C More Entertainment and TV4 series Sanctuary and made guest appearances as Paul in the ITV detective drama Grantchester and Lord Tinglant in the Netflix fantasy series The Witcher.

In 2020, Perret joined the recurring cast of the medieval drama The Last Kingdom, also on Netflix, for its fourth series as antagonist Wihtgar. He was promoted to the main cast for the drama's fifth and final series. Perret also had a recurring role as Pascal in the BBC Two comedy The First Team.

On stage, Perret starred as Len in the 2022 revival of the stage adaptation of Harold Pinter's The Dwarfs at the White Bear Theatre in South London. He and his fellow cast members won the London Pub Theatre Award for Best Ensemble.

He has role in the U&Dave series Hit Point.

== Filmography ==
=== Film ===
Year	Title	Role	Notes
2020	Ernie	Jamie	Short film
2024	Arthur's Whisky	Young Arthur	
2025	Penicillin	Ayden	Short film
2026	Sister Anna	Matthaeus Cammerhoff	Short film
2026	Soulm8te		

=== Television ===
Year	Title	Role	Notes
2019	Grantchester	Paul	1 episode
2019	Sanctuary	Corin	6 episodes
2019	The Witcher	Lord Tinglant	Episode: "Of Banquets, Bastards and Burials"
2020	The First Team	Pascal	4 episodes
2020–2022	The Last Kingdom	Wihtgar	Recurring role, series 4; main role, series 5 (7 episodes)
2021	Trying	Mathieu	Episode: "Lift Me Up"
2023–2026	Mittens & Pants	Monsieur LaFleur	Voice role, UK version (25 episodes)
2024	D-Day: The Unheard Tapes	Herbert Meier	2 episodes
2026	We Might Regret This	Louis	1 episode
2026	Hit Point		

=== Video games ===
Year	Title	Role	Notes
2023	Amnesia: The Bunker	Augustin Lambert	
2024	Dragon Age: The Veilguard	Bastian / Additional voices	
2025	Delta Force	Nox	
2025	Dying Light: The Beast	Sven	
TBA	Star Citizen	Merchant	

=== Audio ===
Year	Title	Role	Notes
2022	The Little Prince	Narrator	2022 Puffin Classics audiobook edition

=== Stage ===
Year	Title	Role	Notes
2022	The Dwarfs	Len	White Bear Theatre, London
