= The Last Tudor =

2016 historical novel by Philippa Gregory

- UK first edition cover
- Author: Philippa Gregory
- Language: English
- Series: Tudor Series
- Genre: Historical novel
- Publisher: Simon & Schuster
- Publication date: 8 August 2017
- Publication place: United Kingdom
- Pages: 528
- ISBN: 9781471133053
- Preceded by: Three Sisters, Three Queens

The Last Tudor is a historical novel by British author Philippa Gregory, published on 9 August 2016. It recounts the story of Lady Mary Grey, the 'last Tudor' and sister to Lady Jane Grey who was Queen of England for nine days, and Lady Katherine Grey who sought to produce a royal heir before both met the executioner.
