= Wideacre =

Book by Philippa Gregory

- First edition cover
- Author: Philippa Gregory
- Language: English
- Series: Wideacre trilogy
- Genre: Historical fiction
- Publisher: Simon & Schuster (US); Viking Press (UK)
- Publication date: February 1987 (US); 9 April 1987 (UK)
- Publication place: United States; United Kingdom
- Media type: Print (Hardcover, Paperback)
- Pages: 556 (US); 544 (UK)
- ISBN: 9780671634629 (US); 978-0670815340 (UK)
- Followed by: The Favoured Child

Wideacre is a 1987 historical novel by Philippa Gregory. This novel is Gregory's debut, and the first in the Wideacre trilogy that includes The Favoured Child (1989) and Meridon (1990). Set in the second half of the 18th century, it follows Beatrice Lacey's destructive lifelong attempts to gain control of the Wideacre estate.

== Plot summary ==
Beatrice Lacey is the daughter of the Squire of Wideacre, an estate situated on the South Downs, centred around Wideacre Hall. Devoted to her father, at the age of five years she falls in love with the estate and decides to stay there forever. At 11, her dreams are shattered when she learns that her absent brother Harry will inherit the estate, and that she be married off and leave. Young Beatrice begins an affair with Ralph, the gamekeeper's son, who lives with his mother, Meg, a village witch, in a cottage on the estate. Harry returns and discovers them entwined, ending the relationship. Threatened by Harry's presence, Beatrice agrees without thinking to a plan Ralph reveals to take the estate for the two of them. She realises too late what it is Ralph has planned, but before she can stop him Ralph murders her father and makes it look like a riding accident. Enraged by the sight of her father's corpse whom she loved so much, she feels guilty, and is afraid that if Ralph were caught he would associate with her. Beatrice decides she cannot allow him to continue living on Wideacre. She lures him over a mantrap and leaves him for dead. To her dismay, she later discovers that he has escaped—maimed but alive—with his mother's help. Knowing he will someday seek revenge, Beatrice becomes more callous, manipulative and ruthless.

Beatrice teaches Harry how to run Wideacre, but soon her position is threatened by Harry's attraction to their neighbour's stepdaughter, Lady Celia Havering. Beatrice handily seduces Harry to gain control of him, and befriends the sweet and innocent Celia. Harry marries Celia with the blessing of Beatrice, who accompanies them on their honeymoon to France. Beatrice discovers she is pregnant with Harry's child, lying to Celia that the child is the product of a rape. Celia decides to pass the child off as her own, sending Harry back to England and later writing to him with the "good news". Beatrice gives birth to a girl, whom Celia names Julia. Beatrice is disgusted it is not a boy, for he would inherit Wideacre, and withdraws responsibility of the child. Despite a newly assertive Celia taking her place as Harry's wife and Lady of Wideacre, Beatrice secures her hold once again over her brother.

At the peak of her power, Beatrice is attracted to the intelligent and provocative young Dr John MacAndrew. Determined to stay on Wideacre, she refuses his marriage proposal; finding herself pregnant again by Harry, she agrees to marry John, who in turn agrees to live at Wideacre. Beatrice gives birth to a boy whom she names Richard, and intends to pass off as John's child. John is away, so Beatrice plans for him to be gone long enough for the baby to look the correct number of months. John comes home too early, and as a doctor he can see immediately that the baby is not premature. Disillusioned, John refuses to believe Beatrice when she says that she was raped but that her love for him is not a lie. He begins to drink to forget her betrayal. Harry seduces Beatrice in the parlor and their mother discovers them. She faints from the shock, and in a catatonic state she mutters over and over "I only came to get my book ... Harry, Beatrice, no!" Beatrice knows her mother will ultimately reveal her secret, so she manipulates Celia into inadvertently overdosing her mother on the laudanum John has prescribed. John is blamed as it is told he himself prescribed the wrong amount, and what was left of his reputation is destroyed. Beatrice and Harry's mother dies; John realises what Beatrice has done, and also now suspects her perverted relationship with Harry. Before John can come through on his threats to ruin her, Beatrice uses his drinking to have him dragged off to an insane asylum, his screams that she is an incestuous whore and a murderess fall on deaf ears.

With John out of the way and his £200,000 fortune under her control, Beatrice coerces Harry to go along with her scheme to marry "cousins" Julia and Richard to each other legally and make them joint heirs to the Wideacre estate. In need of more money to complete their plan, Beatrice and Harry mortgage the estate and begin to enclose the common land. As this strips the villagers of places to graze their animals and raise their own vegetables, it incites anger and resentment on the estate. Beatrice, intent on her plans, does not care. Realising what is happening, Celia frees John from the asylum, bringing him back to Wideacre and managing to restore his medical reputation. John and Celia do their best to help alleviate the villagers' poverty and deprivation, in contrast to the increasingly corrupt and ruthless Beatrice and Harry.

Word comes that "The Culler", a shadowy outlaw who is against enclosure and the aristocracy, is heading for Wideacre. Knowing that the Culler is her first love Ralph, Beatrice is both afraid and desirous of his vengeance. Harry discovers that Julia is Beatrice's daughter (though not that he is the father of Julia or Richard). Finally recognising the enormity of Beatrice's crimes and destructive nature, Celia calls her out and leaves, with Harry and Julia in tow. John takes Richard and leaves as well, his only remaining desire being to save Celia and the children from the corruptive influence of Beatrice's wickedness. Harry dies of a heart attack en route. Left alone, Beatrice knows that the arriving villagers have to come to burn down the Hall and kill her, but she does not care. She is overjoyed to see Ralph, though the last thing she sees is the knife in his hand. She welcomes her death, understanding that it is justice and her only hope of redemption.

== Characters ==
Beatrice Lacey: Daughter of the Squire of Wideacre and sister to Harry Lacey. She is considered by the villagers as the true master of Wideacre after her father's death. Unable to retain Wideacre, Beatrice stops at nothing to achieve her goal of staying on the land forever, even going as far as to committing incest and murder. As a teenager, she falls in love with Ralph and remains in love with him, despite her affair with Harry and her marriage to John. With Harry, she gives birth to a daughter, Julia, and a son, Richard. Her affair with Harry is purely out of greed and passion for the land, and her marriage with John deteriorates when he learns about her secrets. Her attempts to gain the land cause it to go bankrupt and ruined. At the end of the novel, she is remorseful of her actions and dies at Ralph's hands, knowing only he can end her sinful legacy.

Harry Lacey: Beatrice's older brother who is the new Squire of Wideacre. He is easily seduced by Beatrice, even though he knows what they're doing is wrong. Unlike the headstrong and stubborn Beatrice, Harry is timid and weak. He is also very dense, even though he was sent away to a private school for lessons. He is sexually attracted to Beatrice and has a sexual relationship with her throughout the novel, resulting in the birth of two children, Julia and Richard. He marries Celia, whom he grows to love and respect, and raises Julia without knowing she (and Richard) are his inbred offspring with Beatrice. He has a weak heart, which he dies from at the end.

Ralph Megson: The gamekeeper's son who falls in love with Beatrice. Together they plot to seize Wideacre for themselves. Their plan does not come into fruition, however, because Beatrice turns on Ralph and attempts to murder him. He later returns as 'The Culler' who revolts against the Quality. He kills Beatrice at the end of Wideacre, but stays by the land to help watch over Julia and Richard in The Favoured Child. He kills Richard at the end of The Favoured Child.

Dr. John MacAndrew: A bright and quick witted doctor from Edinburgh, Scotland who falls in love with and marries Beatrice. They become estranged after he discovers the truth about Beatrice and Harry's incestuous relationship, as well as Beatrice's murderous attempts to give the land to her children. To get revenge against her and save the children, he later starts plotting their downfall. He eventually falls in love with Celia, though they do not have an affair. At the end of the novel, they leave the house together. He travels to India to earn more money for the family and comes back to raise the children with Celia in The Favoured Child. He is murdered by Richard.

Celia Lacey: Harry's wife, who later becomes the moral force for good against Beatrice's manipulative schemes. Her marriage to Harry is arranged, but she grows to love him for his gentleness. She is thrilled to accept Julia as her own daughter, as it is later discovered that she is unable to have children. When she becomes estranged from Harry, she falls in love with John, with whom she leaves and raises the children until they are murdered by Richard in The Favoured Child.

Julia Lacey: Daughter of Beatrice and Harry. She is passed off as Celia's daughter and later raised by her and John. Although less timid and naïve as Harry, her sheltered upbringing causes her to have less confidence and accept Richard's abuse. While she describes Richard as her childhood friend, bully, and betrothed, she has no feelings for him and attempts to escape from him by marrying the first man she falls in love with. However, Richard rapes and impregnates her to stop the engagement, and then forces her to marry him. She gives birth to a girl, whom she names Sarah, before she dies from a fever during afterbirth complications.

Richard MacAndrew: Son of Beatrice and Harry. He is passed off as John's son by Beatrice and later raised by John and Celia. As deceptive and sociopathic as his mother, Richard is determined to fulfill Beatrice's wish of claiming Wideacre by marrying Julia. When his position is threatened by Julia and others, he murders those who stand in his way, and rapes Julia, resulting in a pregnancy and birth of a daughter, Sarah. The night of his child's birth, Richard is murdered by Ralph.

Sarah Lacey (AKA Meridon): Daughter of Julia and Richard, and granddaughter of Beatrice and Harry. After the deaths of her parents, she is given to and raised by gypsies and renamed Meridon to hide her true identity. However, as she enters womanhood, she discovers that she comes from the Lacey family and is offered to inherit Wideacre if she leaves her previous family and life behind. However, she cannot reconcile the two worlds and leaves her husband and Wideacre. She never learns that her parents and grandparents were brothers and sisters.

== Sequels ==
In The Favoured Child (1989), John and Celia reunite and raise young Richard and Julia, but Richard inherits his mother's destructive desire to claim Wideacre. Meridon (1990) follows young Sarah Lacey, renamed Meridon and raised by gypsies, as she discovers her past as the daughter of Richard and Julia.
