= Nightmare in Silver =

238 – "Nightmare in Silver"
- Doctor Who episode
- Promotional poster

Cast
- Doctor: Matt Smith – Eleventh Doctor
- Companion: Jenna-Louise Coleman – Clara Oswald
- Others: Eve de Leon Allen – Angie Maitland; Kassius Carey Johnson – Artie Maitland; Jason Watkins – Webley; Warwick Davis – Porridge; Tamzin Outhwaite – Captain; Eloise Joseph – Beauty; Will Merrick – Brains; Calvin Dean – Ha-Ha; Zahra Ahmadi – Missy; Aidan Cook – Cyberman; Nicholas Briggs – Voice of the Cybermen

Production
- Directed by: Stephen Woolfenden
- Written by: Neil Gaiman
- Produced by: Denise Paul; Marcus Wilson (series producer)
- Executive producers: Steven Moffat; Caroline Skinner
- Music by: Murray Gold
- Series: Series 7
- Running time: 45 minutes
- First broadcast: 11 May 2013

Chronology
← Preceded by "The Crimson Horror"	Followed by → "The Name of the Doctor"

"Nightmare in Silver" is the twelfth and penultimate episode of the seventh series of the British science fiction television series Doctor Who and was first broadcast on BBC One on 11 May 2013. It was written by Neil Gaiman and directed by Stephen Woolfenden.

In the episode, the alien time traveller the Doctor (Matt Smith) and his companion Clara Oswald (Jenna-Louise Coleman) bring two children, Angie (Eve de Leon Allen) and Artie (Kassius Carey Johnson), to an extraterrestrial theme park, where an army of cyborgs called Cybermen reawaken centuries after their defeat in a war. The Cybermen discover the Doctor, and attempt to transform him into a "Cyber-Planner", which creates a split personality fighting for control of the Doctor's body with a game of chess.

The episode, watched by 6.64 million viewers in the United Kingdom, was the first to feature the Cybermen since the episode "Closing Time" in the previous series. Gaiman later stated that he did not love the experience and that it inspired him to become the showrunner of his series Good Omens (2019–present).

== Plot ==
The Eleventh Doctor takes Clara, Angie and Artie to an extraterrestrial theme park. They find the park is closed down and occupied by a punishment platoon, Webley, the theme park's museum curator, and "Porridge", a person of short stature, who runs the museum's star attraction – a Mechanical Turk-type chess apparatus with a deactivated Cyberman in place of the Turk. There are a number of these deactivated Cybermen around the park, as they were defeated a thousand years ago. The Doctor convinces the platoon that he is an ambassador working for their missing Emperor, and is allowed to stay. An army of Cybermen that were hiding under the park and slowly upgrading their parts wake up and kidnap Angie and Artie. The Doctor puts Clara in charge of the troops, warning her not to let them destroy the planet while he rescues the children.

The Doctor finds the children, but he is partially upgraded into a Cyberman, sharing the Cyberman hive-mind. This gives him a split personality as both the Doctor and the "Cyber-Planner", who names himself Mr Clever, share the same body and each control almost half of the brain. The Doctor and Mr Clever agree to play chess for the complete control of the body. Mr Clever is temporarily stopped by the Doctor placing a golden ticket on his face, explaining that the Cybermen's weakness to gold is still present in their current code; Mr Clever soon installs a patch to overcome this weakness.

Clara relocates the platoon to elsewhere in the park and they take stock of minimal arms: one large anti-Cyberman gun with a limited charge, five hand pulsers, and a planet-imploding bomb. The Doctor returns with Angie and Artie, and demands that Clara tie him up to let him finish his chess game, while the platoon hold off poorly against the Cybermen, who can quickly adapt and upgrade to overcome any obstacle. Mr Clever destroys the bomb trigger, leaving the group defenceless. The Doctor uses a hand pulser to remove Mr Clever from his mind. Angie realises that Porridge is the Emperor after recognising him from an imperial penny and a waxwork model. Porridge then activates the bomb verbally and signals for an imperial spaceship to teleport them away. At the Doctor's request, Porridge retrieves the Doctor's ship the TARDIS just before the planet implodes, destroying the Cyberman army.

== Production ==
"Nightmare in Silver" was written by Neil Gaiman and directed by Stephen Woolfenden. The episode had the working title of "The Last Cyberman". Gaiman had previously written the series 6 episode "The Doctor's Wife", which was positively received. Lead writer and executive producer Steven Moffat contacted Gaiman about writing for the series and asked him to make the Cybermen "scary again". Gaiman announced his return to Doctor Who during his Hugo Award acceptance speech for "The Doctor's Wife", commenting that "only a fool or a madman would try again – so [he was] on his third draft now".

Some location filming took place at Castell Coch. The castle was previously in the series 4 episode "Journey's End" as a UNIT base and in series 5 episode "The Vampires of Venice" as the Calvierri Castle.

The episode stars Matt Smith and Jenna Coleman as the Eleventh Doctor and Clara Oswald respectively. Warwick Davis, who portrayed Poridge, stated that it was a "thrill" to be in Doctor Who, especially in an episode with the Cybermen written by Gaiman. Angie and Artie, the children Clara babysits, were portrayed by Eve de Leon Allen and Kassius Johnson respectively, who previously appeared in "The Crimson Horror".

=== Cyberman redesign ===
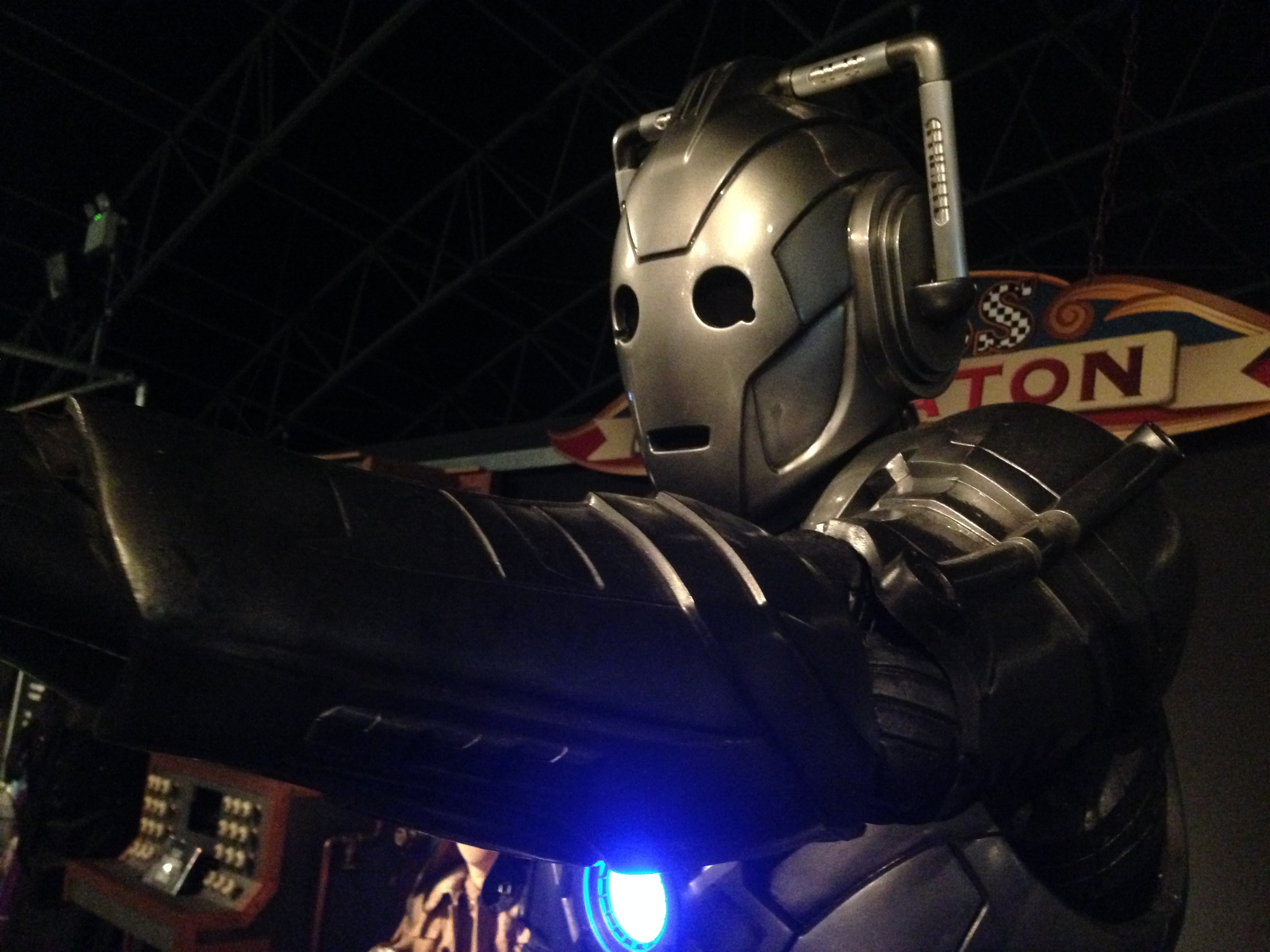
The redesigned Cybermen as they appear at the Doctor Who Experience

On redesigning the Cybermen, Gaiman thought back to classic series serials The Moonbase (1967) and The Tomb of the Cybermen (1967) and decided to "take the 1960s Cybermen and [incorporate] everything that's happened since". However, Gaiman said that he "got completely side-tracked by a mad, strange romp". Moffat stated that the Cybermen were redesigned because they did so often in the classic series, and yet had been consistent in the new series.

Gaiman was motivated to provide a "rationalisation" for the Cybermen in current Doctor Who continuity. The classic series had depicted the Cybermen as alien cyborgs, while the revived series initially depicted them as human cyborgs from a parallel Earth; (Note: The alternate universe origin was dropped following "Doomsday"; afterwards, Cybermen used their original origin.) Gaiman opined that his Cybermen stemmed from an encounter and amalgamation of these two types of Cybermen.

=== Lost script ===
During filming at Castell Coch, a copy of the readthrough script was found in a taxi in Cardiff. It was marked as being de Leon Allen's copy and had the working title of "The Last Cyberman", which was subsequently changed. The script was found by Hannah Durham, who posted a picture of the script to Facebook with the caption: "found Dr Who script in the back of a taxi. Cheeky spoilers anyone?" It was then posted to Reddit by Dan Rowling with the caption: "Look what a Facebook friend found in a taxi in Cardiff on Monday". Arrangements were then made by Hannah Durham and Dan Rowling to return the script to the BBC.

== Broadcast and reception ==
=== Broadcast ===
Professional ratings
Review scores
Source	Rating
Den of Geek	4.5/5 stars
IGN	7/10
New York Magazine	5/5 stars
Radio Times	1/5 stars
SFX	3.5/5 stars
The A.V. Club	B+

Overnight viewing figures estimate that the episode was watched by 4.7 million viewers, rising to 6.64 million after calculating the final ratings, making it the ninth most-watched programme of the week on BBC One.

=== Critical reception ===
The episode scored 84 on the Appreciation Index, indicating that the public enjoyed it. Collider's Aiden Green reported that the episode "was far worse received" than Gaiman's previous episode. Smith and Davis's performances were widely praised by critics. (Note: Attributed to multiple sources:)

Dan Martin from The Guardian stated that "The Cybermen are back – and scary for the first time since the 60s, thanks to a whimsical but effective script from Neil Gaiman." Ross Ruediger of New York Magazine wrote that Gaiman "created an amazing yet believable world here — one that felt otherworldly and yet close to home. The designs of the amusement park captivate", and praised the cast, especially Davis' performance. Sarah Crompton at The Daily Telegraph felt that Gaiman succeeded in making the Cybermen scary again, though the episode "could have done with more variation in pace and tone". IGN's Mark Snow gave the episode a positive review. However, he felt that the episode was somewhat underwhelming. He added that it worked as the return for the Cybermen. Simon Brew of Den of Geek praised the episode's nods to both previous Doctor Who episodes and to the Borg from Star Trek. Brew specifically noted the Borg-like adaptation to specific threats, he described it as something that is both "familiar" and which "works in making them feel less beatable".

Neela Debnath at The Independent called it "another episode which failed to live up to the hype". She felt that while Gaiman's writing for the Doctor and his internal battle was good, other characters were "superfluous and two-dimensional". Debnath opined that Smith's performance partially redeemed the episode. Patrick Mulkern of Radio Times was very critical of the episode, describing it as an "almighty Cyber flop". Mulkern thought the Cyber Planner-possessed Doctor scenes were "the principal failing of the drama [...] despite Matt Smith's gallant efforts", and compared it to the 1988 serial Silver Nemesis, which he labeled "execrable". Gaiman later admitted that the episode was not the best, adding that it "left him with 'a bad taste in [his] mouth'" and inspired him to take more creative control with Good Omens (2019–present) as its showrunner.
