= The Little House (novel) =

1996 novel by Philippa Gregory

- First UK edition cover
- Author: Philippa Gregory
- Language: English
- Genre: Psychological thriller
- Publisher: HarperCollins
- Publication date: October 1996
- Publication place: United Kingdom
- Media type: Print (Hardcover)
- Pages: 357
- ISBN: 978-0060176709

The Little House is a 1996 psychological thriller novel by British author Philippa Gregory.

== Synopsis ==
After four years of marriage, Ruth and Patrick Cleary, a young English couple, visit Patrick's parents in Bath. Having been orphaned as a child, Ruth feels isolated and alone in the oppressive, close-knit Cleary family, and her husband seems unaware of her discomfort. She has always longed for a family of her own, and in the early days of their marriage believed she had found it with Patrick, but now, caught up in his career as a journalist, Patrick seems distant and distracted from his wife's concerns. On an impulse, Patrick buys a cottage near his parents' isolated manor house and sells the apartment his wife has made her home. After the move, Ruth loses her job and, though she had not intended to become a mother, she falls pregnant. After the birth of her child, she suffers post-natal depression, and Patrick's mother Elizabeth, the domineering matriarch of the Cleary family, begins to take over Ruth's role as mother and homemaker. Having been manipulated by her mother-in-law into a stay at a "rest home", Ruth is so medicated she can barely function, but she rallies, and finally wrests control of her life in a final Gothic twist.

== Reception ==
The Little House, a contemporary psychological thriller, was a departure from Gregory's historical novels "of tightly laced corsets, the corrugated lace of magnificently decorative ruffs, cunning plots and manipulative manoeuvres in the dangerous arena of Tudor politics"

== Adaptation ==
The Little House was adapted for television in 2010 by Ed Whitmore as a two-part drama starring Francesca Annis and Lucy Griffiths. The series was produced by TXTV, directed by Jamie Payne and broadcast in the UK on ITV, receiving positive reviews. Brian Viner of The Independent praised it, saying "a top notch cast, a decent script and clever moody direction make The Little House highly watchable." Sam Wollaston of The Guardian wrote, “I knew pretty much exactly where [it] was heading…Yet it still managed to be creepy,” while Andrew Billen of The Times said, “It’s so silly it should have been shown on Hallowe’en.”
