= The Age of Innocence (TV series) =

American television series

- Genre: Period drama
- Created by: Emma Frost
- Based on: The Age of Innocence by Edith Wharton
- Showrunner: Emma Frost
- Written by: Emma Frost
- Directed by: Shannon Murphy; Lisa Brühlmann; Natalia Leite
- Starring: Camila Morrone; Kristine Froseth; Ben Radcliffe; Fiona Glascott; Belinda Bromilow; Emma Shipp; John Light; Margo Martindale
- Country of origin: United States
- Original language: English

Production
- Executive producers: Emma Frost; Shannon Murphy; Peter Chernin; Jenno Topping; Tracey Cook; Pavlina Hatoupis
- Production company: Chernin Entertainment

Original release
- Network: Netflix

The Age of Innocence is an upcoming American period drama miniseries for Netflix, adapted by Emma Frost from Edith Wharton's 1920 novel. The cast is led by Kristine Froseth, Ben Radcliffe, Camila Morrone, and Margo Martindale.

== Premise ==
A love triangle forms during the Gilded Age of nineteenth-century New York City.

== Cast ==
=== Main ===
- Camila Morrone as Ellen Olenska
- Kristine Froseth as May Welland
- Ben Radcliffe as Newland Archer
- Fiona Glascott as Augusta Weiland
- Belinda Bromilow as Adeline Archer
- Emma Shipp as Janey Archer
- John Light as Mr. Lovell Mingott
- Margo Martindale as Mrs. Manson-Mingott

=== Supporting ===
- Will Tudor as Mr. Lovell Mingott
- Hayley Mills as Louisa Van Der Luyden
- Ryan Morgan as Lawrence Lefferts
- Steven Pacey as Judge John Welland
- Kel Matsena as Ned Winsett
- Lucia Balordi as Nastasia
- Elly Roberts as Edith Mingott
- Jack Cutmore-Scott as Julius Beaufort
- Anna Madeley as Aunt Medora
- Michael Cochrane as Henry Van Der Luyden

== Episodes ==
No.	Title	Directed by	Written by	Original release date
1	TBA	Shannon Murphy	Emma Frost	February 18, 2027
2	TBA	Shannon Murphy	Emma Frost	February 18, 2027
3	TBA	Shannon Murphy	Emma Frost	February 18, 2027
4	TBA	Lisa Brühlmann	Emma Frost	February 18, 2027
5	TBA	Lisa Brühlmann	Emma Frost	February 18, 2027
6	TBA	Lisa Brühlmann	Emma Frost	February 18, 2027
7	TBA	Natalia Leite	Emma Frost	February 18, 2027
8	TBA	Natalia Leite	Emma Frost	February 18, 2027

== Production ==
=== Development ===
The series is adapted from Edith Wharton's 1920 novel of the same name. It is written by Emma Frost who is also showrunner and executive producer. Executive producers also include Peter Chernin, Jenno Topping and Tracey Cook for Chernin Entertainment, Shannon Murphy and Pavlina Hatoupis. Murphy is directing the first three episodes, with Lisa Bruhlmann and Natalia Leite also directing.

=== Casting ===
The cast is led by Kristine Froseth, Ben Radcliffe, Camila Morrone and Margo Martindale, and also includes Fiona Glascott, Belinda Bromilow, Hayley Mills, Will Tudor, and Emma Shipp.

=== Filming ===
Principal photography took place in Prague in October 2025.

== Release ==
The series is scheduled to premiere on February 18, 2027.
