= Hit Point (TV series) =

British television series

- Genre: Crime drama
- Screenplay by: Howard Overman
- Directed by: David Caffrey
- Starring: Nick Blood; Saffron Hocking; Nadia Parkes; William Abadie; Brendan Coyle; Peter Serafinowicz; Ossian Perret
- Country of origin: United Kingdom
- Original language: English
- No. of series: 1
- No. of episodes: 6

Production
- Executive producers: Howard Overman; Johnny Capps; Julian Murphy
- Running time: 47 minutes
- Production companies: Urban Myth Films; StudioCanal

Original release
- Network: U&Dave
- Release: 13 August 2026 – present

Hit Point is a crime drama television series written by Howard Overman and starring Nick Blood, Saffron Hocking, Nadia Parkes, William Abadie, Brendan Coyle, Peter Serafinowicz and Ossian Perret. It was the first original drama series commissioned by U&Dave. It premiered on 13 August 2026.

== Premise ==
Detectives investigate the London underworld.

== Cast ==
- Nick Blood as Leo
- Saffron Hocking as Bella
- Nadia Parkes as Sophia
- William Abadie as Pascal
- Brendan Coyle as Michael
- Peter Serafinowicz as Carter
- Moe Bar-El as Dylan
- Ossian Perret as Lucas
- Joshua Sher as Alfie

== Production ==
The series is written by Howard Overman and produced by Urban Myth Films, with Canal+ co-financing and Studio Canal handling sales. The series is directed by David Caffrey with the executive producers including Overman, Johnny Capps and Julian Murphy. It was commissioned by UKTV channel U&Dave in the United Kingdom, the first original drama commission by the channel.

The cast is led by Nick Blood and Saffron Hocking with Nadia Parkes, William Abadie, Brendan Coyle, Peter Serafinowicz, Moe Bar-El and Ossian Perret.

Filming took place in London in the autumn of 2025.

== Broadcast ==
The series premiered on U&Dave on 13 August 2026. The first episode was also simultaneously broadcast on U&Drama and U&W in a 'roadblock' stunt transmission.
