= Emma Frost (screenwriter) =

British screenwriter and showrunner

Emma Frost is a British screenwriter, playwright and showrunner, known in television for her work creating and show running The White Queen, The White Princess, The Spanish Princess and the upcoming Netflix limited series The Age Of Innocence, in addition to her writing on the television series Shameless.

== Career ==
Frost trained as a fine artist and started out in theatre, before she began working in television on series such as The Queen's Nose, as well as the BBC's popular continuing dramas, Doctors and Casualty. Frost wrote and consulted on multiple episodes of Shameless. She has written Jamaica Inn, the BBC adaptation of Daphne Du Maurier's novel of the same name, The Man in the High Castle and The Tunnel. She jointly showran and wrote The Spanish Princess with Matthew Graham.

Her debut play Airsick premiered at the Bush Theatre, London, in 2003.

Her film work includes the BBC Four drama Consuming Passion: 100 Years of Mills & Boon and the screenplay to Zelda, a film that was in development by Ron Howard.

Frost was the sole writer, showrunner and executive producer of the Netflix limited series The Age of Innocence, based on the novel of the same name by Edith Wharton.

== Personal life ==
Frost is married to writer and showrunner Matthew Graham. She is trustee of the children's arts charity Anno's Africa. She is based in between the Chew Valley and London. .
