= A Respectable Trade =

1995 historical novel

- First edition (publ. HarperCollins)
- Author: Philippa Gregory
- Publication date: 1 February 2007
- Pages: 512
- ISBN: 0-7432-7254-4

A Respectable Trade is a 1995 historical novel by Philippa Gregory set in the Bristol docks in 1787.

== Adaptation ==
Gregory adapted her work into a four-part TV serial which was broadcast by the BBC in 1998 and by the PBS in the United States in the fall of 1999. The series was partially filmed on site in Bristol, utilising the former house (and now museum) of plantation and slave owner John Pinney.

=== Reception ===
A Respectable Trade was nominated in several BAFTA categories, including best serial, winning one BAFTA for Frances Tempest's historical costumes.

=== Cast ===
- Warren Clarke, Josiah Cole a trader in sugar, rum and eventually slaves
- Emma Fielding, Frances Scott, his new aristocratic wife
- Ariyon Bakare, Mehuru, an educated African slave
- Grahame Fox, John Bates Slave driver
