= Ruairi O'Connor =

Irish actor (born 1991)

Ruairí O'Connor
- Born: 9 July 1991 (age 35); Howth, County Dublin, Ireland
- Education: The Lir Academy
- Occupation: Actor
- Years active: 2012–present
- Partner: Charlotte Hope (2018–present)
- Children: 1

Ruairí O'Connor (born 9 July 1991) is an Irish actor. On television, he is known for his role as Henry Tudor, the future Henry VIII, in the Starz series The Spanish Princess (2019–2020). His films include Handsome Devil (2016) and The Conjuring: The Devil Made Me Do It (2021).

== Early life and education ==
O'Connor grew up in Howth, County Dublin, Ireland, as the oldest of four siblings. His family moved to the countryside when he was 14 to live on a stud farm. He graduated with a bachelor's degree in acting from The Lir Academy at Trinity College Dublin in 2015.

== Career ==
O'Connor began his career in 2012 when he was cast as Niall in the Lenny Abrahamson film What Richard Did.

In 2016, he had a guest role in the RTÉ2 series Can't Cope, Won't Cope and a recurring role in the BBC Northern Ireland series My Mother and Other Strangers. He landed his first major television role as Michael Vincent in the Sky One series Delicious from 2016 to 2018. That same year, he starred as the school-bully and chief antagonist Weasel in the teen coming of age film Handsome Devil.

O'Connor starred alongside Elle Fanning in the 2018 film Teen Spirit. In May 2018, it was announced that O'Connor would play Prince Harry Tudor (later Henry VIII) in the 2019 STARZ mini-series The Spanish Princess. A second run of eight episodes was ordered by Starz and began filming in September 2019.

O'Connor played the role of Arne Cheyenne Johnson in the 2021 release of The Conjuring: The Devil Made Me Do It. The film depicts the real life case of Johnson; the first murder defendant in American legal history to plead not guilty by reason of demonic possession.

O'Connor played Orpheus in Season 2 of the 2025 Netflix series The Sandman.

== Personal life ==
O'Connor lives between London and Dublin.

After meeting on the set of The Spanish Princess in 2018, O'Connor has since been in a relationship with his co-star Charlotte Hope. In November 2025, she announced that the couple had recently had their first child.

== Filmography ==
=== Film ===
Year	Title	Role	Notes
2012	What Richard Did	Niall	
2016	Handsome Devil	Weasel	
2018	Teen Spirit	Keyan Spears	
2020	The Postcard Killings	Simon Haysmith / Mac Randolph	
2021	The Conjuring: The Devil Made Me Do It	Arne Cheyenne Johnson	
2022	Surprised by Oxford	Kent Weber	
2024	King Frankie	Fraser	
TBA	Hiker	Nick	

=== Television ===
Year	Title	Role	Notes
2015	Tinderface	Killian	TV series
2016	Can't Cope, Won't Cope	Simon	Episode: "I Wanna Be Like You"
2016	My Mother and Other Strangers	Andrew Black	3 episodes
2016–2018	Delicious	Michael Vincent	7 episodes
2019–2020	The Spanish Princess	Henry VIII/Prince Harry Tudor	Miniseries; 16 episodes
2021	The Morning Show	Ty Fitzgerald	Main role (season 2)
2023	Royal Rendezvous	James, Marquess of Cornworthy	Television film
2025	The Sandman	Orpheus	2 episodes
