= Kidnapped: The Chloe Ayling Story =

British Television series

- Screenplay by: Georgia Lester
- Directed by: Al Mackay
- Starring: Nadia Parkes
- Country of origin: United Kingdom
- Original language: English
- No. of series: 1
- No. of episodes: 6

Production
- Executive producers: Georgia Lester; Priscilla Parish; Michael Parke; Andrew Morrissey; Lucy Richer
- Producer: Claire Shepherd
- Production company: BBC Studios

Original release
- Network: BBC Three
- Release: 14 August – 28 August 2024

Kidnapped: The Chloe Ayling Story is a six-part British television series, based on the true-life kidnapping of British model Chloe Ayling. It premiered on 14 August 2024 on BBC Three with Nadia Parkes in the lead role. BBC Studios produced the series, which was written by Georgia Lester, directed by Al Mackay, and produced by Clare Shepherd.

== Premise ==
Model Chloe Ayling arrived in Milan, Italy for a modelling job in 2017 only to be abducted by brothers Łukasz and Michał Herba. She was held for six days for a ransom of £265,000. The brothers were sentenced to jail in 2018.

== Cast and characters ==
- Nadia Parkes as Chloe Ayling
- Adrian Edmondson as Phil Green
- Nigel Lindsay as Adrian Sington
- Emmanuele Aita as Gianluca
- Olive Gray as Amber
- Eleonora Romandini as Nicoletta
- Julian Świeżewski as MD/Łukasz Herba
- Jaroslaw Ciepichal as Michał Herba
- Christine Tremarco as Bea
- Lorenzo Richelmy as Francesco
- Robert Glenister as Piers Morgan
- Louise Delamere as Susanna Reid

== Production ==
The project was announced in April 2023 and is made with the full agreement of Chloe Ayling. The series is being written by Georgia Lester and Chloe Ayling was quoted as saying that Lester and the production team had been “incredibly supportive” and that she “couldn't be happier that they are making this series." The project is directed by Al Mackay and Clare Shepherd produces. The executive producers are Priscilla Parish, Michael Parke, and Andrew Morrissey for BBC Studios with Lucy Richer for the BBC, and Georgia Lester.

In July 2023, Nadia Parkes, Adrian Edmondson and Nigel Lindsay were announced to be in the cast, with Parkes playing Chloe Ayling.

Filming began in June 2023. Filming locations include the UK and Italy.

== Broadcast ==
The series was broadcast in the UK on BBC Three on 14 August 2024.

== Reception ==
The series received mixed reviews from critics. Writing in the i, Emily Baker called it a "gripping, propellant drama", awarding it four stars out of five. Vicky Jessop of the Evening Standard gave it the same rating, describing it as "a depressing indictment of how the tabloid press demonise young women" but one that "expertly toes the line between fascinating and depressing."

Hayley Campbell of BBC Radio 5 Live, however, acknowledged it was "fascinating" but "a little slow", while her colleague Scott Bryan said it was "a bit uneven" and "not a Must-Watch". In The Guardian, Jack Seale highlighted what he perceived as the lack of a "compelling narrative", observing that "there’s a lot of inert drama to plough through before later episodes focus more rewardingly on Ayling’s time in the public eye."
