= The Spanish Princess =

Historical drama television series

- Genre: Historical period drama; Historical fiction
- Based on: The King's Curse & The Constant Princess by Philippa Gregory
- Developed by: Emma Frost; Matthew Graham
- Starring: Sai Bennett; Alicia Borrachero; Andrew Buchan; Laura Carmichael; Daniel Cerqueira; Aaron Cobham; Elliot Cowan; Philip Cumbus; Antonio de la Torre; Peter Egan; Alba Galocha; Chloe Harris; Georgie Henley; Charlotte Hope; Angus Imrie; Stephanie Levi-John; Gordon Kennedy; Alan McKenna; Alexandra Moen; Ruairi O'Connor; Nadia Parkes; Richard Pepper; Jordan Renzo; Olly Rix; Ray Stevenson; Harriet Walter
- Composers: Samuel Sim; Chris Egan
- Countries of origin: United States; United Kingdom
- Original language: English
- No. of episodes: 16

Production
- Executive producers: Emma Frost; Matthew Graham; Colin Callender; Scott Huff; Charlie Hampton; Charlie Pattinson
- Producers: Andrea Dewsbery; Pat Tookey-Dickson
- Cinematography: Maja Zamojda; Stefan Ciupek; Ian Moss; Joel Devlin
- Editors: Jo Smyth; Caroline Bleakley; David Yardley; Nikki McChristie; Mark Trend; Gez Morris; Josh Cunliffe; Catherine Creed
- Running time: 54–60 minutes
- Production companies: New Pictures; Playground; Giddy Ink; Jumping Joseph

Original release
- Network: Starz
- Release: 5 May 2019 – 29 November 2020

Related
- The White Queen; The White Princess

The Spanish Princess is a historical drama television limited series developed by Emma Frost and Matthew Graham for Starz. Based on the novels The Constant Princess (2005) and The King's Curse (2014) by Philippa Gregory, it is a sequel to the miniseries The White Queen and The White Princess. It centres around Catherine of Aragon (Charlotte Hope), the eponymous Spanish princess who became Queen of England as the first wife of King Henry VIII (Ruairi O'Connor).

Designed as a 16-part limited series, the first eight episodes premiered on 5 May 2019. On 3 June 2019, Starz ordered the remaining eight episodes, which premiered on 11 October 2020. The series finale aired on 29 November 2020.

== Premise ==
Teenaged princess Catherine of Aragon, daughter of Spanish rulers Isabella and Ferdinand, finally travels to England, to meet her husband by proxy, Arthur, Prince of Wales, heir apparent of Henry VII of England, to whom she has been betrothed since she was a child. Unwelcomed by some, she and her diverse court, including her lady-in-waiting Lina, who is of Moorish ancestry, struggle to adapt to English customs. Catherine is horrified to learn that Arthur's younger brother, the arrogant Henry, Duke of York, later Henry VIII, who at this point, in reality, was just 10 years old, is the author of the romantic correspondence she has received. When Arthur dies suddenly, her destiny as the one who will bring peace between Spain and England seems in doubt, until she sets her sights on Prince Henry.

== Cast ==
=== Main ===
- Sai Bennett as Mary Tudor, Queen of France. Isla Merrick-Lawless portrays young Mary
- Alicia Borrachero as Isabella of Castille
- Andrew Buchan as Thomas More
- Laura Carmichael as Margaret "Maggie" Pole
- Daniel Cerqueira as De Fuensalida, the Spanish ambassador to England
- Aaron Cobham as Oviedo, a Spanish Muslim crossbow-maker and one of Princess Catherine of Aragon's guards
- Elliot Cowan as Henry VII of England
- Philip Cumbus as Thomas Wolsey
- Antonio de la Torre as King Ferdinand II of Aragon
- Peter Egan as General Thomas Howard
- Alba Galocha as Queen Joanna of Castile
- Chloe Harris as Lady Elizabeth "Bessie" Blount
- Georgie Henley as Margaret "Meg" Tudor, Queen of Scotland
- Charlotte Hope as Catherine of Aragon, later Queen of England
- Angus Imrie as Arthur, Prince of Wales
- Stephanie Levi-John as Catalina de Cardonnes, a Morisco lady-in-waiting to Catherine
- Gordon Kennedy as John Stewart, Duke of Albany
- Alan McKenna as Sir Richard Pole
- Alexandra Moen as Elizabeth of York, Queen of England
- Ruairi O'Connor as Harry, Duke of York, later King Henry VIII
- Nadia Parkes as Rosa de Vargas, a lady-in-waiting to Catherine of Aragon
- Richard Pepper as Thomas Boleyn, Earl of Wiltshire
- Jordan Renzo as Charles "Charlie" Brandon
- Olly Rix as Edward Stafford
- Ray Stevenson as King James IV of Scotland
- Harriet Walter as Lady Margaret Beaufort, King Henry VII's mother

=== Recurring ===
- Mamadou Doumbia as John Blanke
- Morgan Jones as Edmund Dudley
- Nick Barber as Edmund de la Pole
- Mimi De Winton (part 1) and Amelia Gething (part 2) as Ursula Pole
- Arthur Bateman (part 1) and Clark Butler (part 2) as Reggie Pole
- Matt Carr (part 1) and Theo Ancient (part 2) as Henry Pole
- Luke Mullins as William Compton
- Moe Idris as Negasi
- Mark Rowley as Alexander Stewart
- Andrew Rothney as Angus Douglas
- Brian Ferguson as Gavin Douglas
- Jamie Michie as Hume
- Alice Nokes as Anne Boleyn
- Bessie Coates as Mary Boleyn
- Christopher Craig as King Louis XII of France
- Milo Callaghan as Henry Stafford
- Thoren Ferguson as Hal Stewart
- Billie Gadsdon as Princess Mary
- Lewis Russell as Jamie

=== Guests ===
- Kenneth Cranham as Bishop John Morton
- Patrick Gibson as Richard of York
- Luka Peroš as Christopher Columbus
- Norman Bowman as William Dunbar
- Philip Andrew Truempi as Philip I of Castile
- Philip McGinley as George Neville
- Sam John as Charles of Burgundy, later King Charles of Spain and Holy Roman Empire
- Ian Pirie as George Douglas
- Tessa Bonham Jones as Anne Hastings
- Molly Vevers as Jane Stewart
- Paul Forman as King Francis of France
- Jimmy Walker as John Lincoln
- Nathanael Jones as Henry Fitzroy

== Episodes ==
No.	Title	Directed by	Written by	Original release date	U.S. viewers (millions)
Part 1 (Note: Some sources refer to the two parts of the limited series as seasons.)
1	"The New World"	Birgitte Stærmose	Emma Frost & Matthew Graham	5 May 2019	0.393
October – November 1501. Princess Catherine of Spain arrives in England. When she meets Arthur, Prince of Wales, Catherine is disappointed that he is not as romantic in person as he was in his letters. She later learns it was Arthur's younger brother, Harry, who exchanged letters with her. Elizabeth, the queen, tells Catherine that the brother of her cousin, Maggie Pole, was beheaded because Catherine's mother, Queen Isabella of Castile, would only pledge Catherine's hand in marriage if there were no other claimants to England's throne. As Harry walks Catherine to the altar on her wedding day, he admits that he initially exchanged letters with her to hurt Arthur, but later found that her letters excited him.
2	"Fever Dream"	Birgitte Stærmose	Matthew Graham	12 May 2019	0.398
November 1501 – April 1502. After the wedding, Arthur and Catherine stay in his father King Henry VII's household for a short time. Arthur and Harry's sister Meg learn that Henry has offered her hand in marriage to James IV of Scotland to form another alliance for England. Catherine begs Maggie Pole's forgiveness for being the reason Maggie's brother was murdered. Arthur and Catherine set off for Ludlow Castle, on the Welsh Marches, to set up their own household as Prince and Princess of Wales; they become closer as they learn more about each other. Maggie Pole and her family accompany them. Arthur becomes gravely ill. Henry and Elizabeth race to Ludlow, but arrive after Arthur dies. Henry informs Catherine she will return to London and stay in the royal household until they know if she is with child.
3	"An Audacious Plan"	Daina Reid	Helen Childress	19 May 2019	0.456
April 1502 – February 1503. Catherine learns that Isabella is arranging another marriage in Europe to cement an alliance. Catherine hides her true condition to bide her time in England, which would solve many problems for her, her maids Lina and Rosa, and her guard, Oviedo. Catherine tells Lina, and later Harry, that her marriage to Arthur was never consummated. Harry proposes and asks King Henry to request a papal dispensation so he and Catherine can marry. Meanwhile, Elizabeth goes into labor. After a difficult stillbirth, Elizabeth realizes that she is not going to survive. Before her death, she has a vision that the Tudor line will end if Harry and Catherine marry and begs Henry to prevent the marriage. As Catherine writes to Isabella for her blessing to marry Harry, mourning bells peal for Elizabeth.
4	"The Battle for Harry"	Daina Reid	Nicki Renna	26 May 2019	0.500
March 1503. Edmund de la Pole, the leading Yorkist claimant to the throne and a cousin of both the late queen and Maggie Pole, is plotting to overthrow King Henry. Henry tells his mother Margaret, who is now Regent while the king grieves for his dead queen, that Harry wants to marry Catherine. She confronts Catherine about her alleged virginity then orders her out of the palace. Margaret bans Maggie from court when Maggie states that Catherine may be telling the truth. Henry learns that the emperor Maximilian I is protecting Edmund de la Pole. Henry sets his grief aside to see Meg off as she departs for Scotland to marry. He hosts a feast to celebrate the future and invites Catherine. Henry makes an announcement that indirectly fulfills the late queen's dying wish: an intended marriage between himself and Catherine.
5	"Heart Versus Duty"	Lisa Clarke	Andrea Thornton Bolden	2 June 2019	0.546
August 1503 – December 1505. Catherine is torn between her duty to marry Henry and her desire to marry Harry. Meg arrives in Scotland and is pleasantly surprised by her betrothed. Harry tells Margaret, and later Catherine, that if Catherine wants to marry him instead of Henry, he will fight for her. Catherine fears her fate should she reject Henry and crush his pride, but decides to follow her heart. She convinces Henry that the alliance with Spain will be weakened when Harry becomes king if she is Henry's widow instead of Harry's wife. Henry withdraws his proposal, but reminds Catherine and Harry that they can only marry if the Pope grants a dispensation and if Spain pays the remainder of Catherine's dowry. Maggie's husband dies unexpectedly.
6	"A Polite Kidnapping"	Lisa Clarke	Emma Frost	9 June 2019	0.493
January – April 1506. Catherine learns that her mother has died, her elder sister Joanna is now queen of Castile, and her father will not pay her dowry. Joanna and her husband Philip are stranded in England. Henry, hoping Philip's father, Maximilian I, will hand over Edmund de la Pole, secretly delays repairs to their ship. Maggie is destitute. To extract a forced confession about Catherine's virginity, Lady Margaret offers assistance to Maggie, which she refuses. In exchange for a promise to pay her dowry, Catherine tells Joanna how she can escape England: Joanna will persuade Maximilian to turn de la Pole over to Henry or lose trade with Castile, if Henry takes an oath to spare de la Pole's life. Rather than pay Catherine's dowry, Joanna forms a new alliance with England at the suggestion of Margaret: betrothing Joanna's son Charles to Harry's younger sister Mary.
7	"All is Lost"	Stephen Woolfenden	Helen Childress	16 June 2019	0.509
September 1506 – 1508. Catherine learns there is to be a double wedding in Spain: Princess Mary to her nephew King Charles, and Harry to her niece Eleanor. Oviedo proposes to Lina and tells her he is working for Margaret. Harry is torn between his duty to marry Eleanor and his desire to marry Catherine. Maggie seeks shelter with Catherine and Lina. Catherine's father King Ferdinand writes that Joanna's husband has died and Joanna is not fit to rule Castile due to mental instability. Ferdinand is now guardian to Joanna's children and Castile's regent. He makes Catherine the Aragonese ambassador to England, and promises to pay her dowry. Catherine's new status allows her and Lina to regain access to the royal palace. Oviedo provides Margaret with the names of de la Pole's co-conspirators, which now include Maggie and her eldest son. He later protects Maggie's son during a raid.
8	"Destiny"	Stephen Woolfenden	Emma Frost & Matthew Graham	23 June 2019	0.528
April 1509 – June 1509. Henry VII dies. Now king, Harry reaffirms his desire to marry Catherine. Margaret accuses Edmund Dudley of treason for her own illegal activities and he is beheaded. Harry pardons Maggie, and she and her children return to court. Margaret extracts a forced confession from Lina about Catherine's virginity by accusing Oviedo of theft and demanding his hanging. Lina and Oviedo marry before his hanging. Harry and Catherine arrive in time to save Oviedo's life. When confronted, Margaret again tries to use the confession, but Harry refuses to believe it as it was obtained by threatening Lina with Oviedo's life. Harry learns the Pope granted a dispensation sometime before Henry's death but this was concealed by Lady Margaret. Margaret dies, haunted by her own history. On their wedding day, Catherine receives a letter from Ferdinand stating Harry had sex with Joanna. Harry denies it, and Catherine again denies that her marriage with Arthur was consummated.
Part 2
9	"Camelot"	Chanya Button	Emma Frost & Matthew Graham	11 October 2020	0.252
Spring and Summer 1511. Catherine's father Ferdinand and his grandson, the future Charles V, Holy Roman Emperor, come to England to make an alliance against France. Henry VIII's sister Mary Tudor speaks Spanish and expresses her desire to wed Charles I. Edward Stafford is injured in a joust, losing his right eye. Lina conceives Oviedo's child. Catherine and Henry VIII seeks to land in Aquitaine (Guyenne) to join Henry VIII's father-in-law to launch an attack against Louis XII. Oviedo, General Howard and Stafford take an army to a pre-arranged meeting point in Spain, only to be betrayed by Ferdinand, who uses the English as a distraction to take Navarre for himself. Prince Harry, six-week-old son of Catherine and Harry, dies, while Catherine beseeches God to forgive her vanity. Furious with Spain and heartbroken at the loss of her son, Catherine receives a gloating letter from her father and reaffirms to the English people that she is English first and she will give another son to England. She affirms to Harry that they will invade France without Spain's help. James IV of Scotland and his wife Margaret Tudor mourn the death of Henry VIII's first-born son with Catherine.
10	"Flodden"	Chanya Button	Simon Tyrrell & Matthew Graham	18 October 2020	0.173
Late 1511 – October 1513. King Harry invades France in the Battle of the Spurs (1513) without the aid of King Ferdinand, leaving a vulnerable England open to a Scottish invasion. Meg attempts to keep the peace in Scotland but an invasion is insisted upon by the warring clans and supported by her arrogant husband, King James IV. With inspiration from her mother, Queen Isabella of Castille, a pregnant Catherine rallies troops and defends England from the Scottish forces of King James IV at the Battle of Flodden (1513). Meg attempts to intervene after she suffers from a terrifying dream regarding her husband's fate, but James doesn't listen to her and dies at the battlefield. After the battle, Catherine miscarries her child.
11	"Grief"	Chanya Button	Rita Kalnejais	25 October 2020	0.180
Late 1513 – Late 1514. Catherine suffers from horrible depression after her and King Harry's tragic loss. Lina confides to Maggie that she struggles feeding her children. Thomas Wolsey proposes matching Henry VIII's sister Mary with Louis XII of the House of Valois. Catherine must regain herself enough to fight to restore her marriage with Harry, who blames her for his lack of male heir, though they reconcile at the end. Henry VIII's oldest sister Meg claims regency in Scotland after the Battle of Flodden while King James V is an infant. Scotland approves of Meg's regency; however, it is contingent upon her remaining a widow. Meg falls in love with Angus.
12	"The Other Woman"	Lisa Clarke	Kate Verghese & Emma Frost	1 November 2020	0.233
Early 1515 – February 1516. The lords of Scotland find out about Meg's second marriage with Angus and removes her from the regency. Meg unsuccessfully attempts to get Harry's help with the situation in Scotland, but he refuses out of anger over her second marriage and her loss of control within Scotland. Meanwhile, a very pregnant Catherine struggles with the nauseating possibility Harry is cheating on her with Anne Hastings. Catherine refuses to be like her sister Joanna and requests Harry tell her about his affairs, to which he coldly denies ever even having an affair. Catherine goes into labour and gives birth to Princess Mary. Maggie helps to dispel rumours of Harry's affairs, but Catherine later discovers Harry is indeed having an affair, and it's with her own maid, Elizabeth "Bessie" Blount.
13	"Plague"	Lisa Clarke	Kate O'Riordan & Emma Frost	8 November 2020	0.221
1517 – June 1519. A betrayed Catherine's grief increases as she takes out her anger on Bessie, King Harry's lover. Catherine continues to struggle caring for her newborn daughter, Mary, due to her not being the male heir she promised King Harry.Henry Stafford weds Ursula Pole. When the plague hits London, the court flees to Hampton Court, Wolsey's house. Maggie and Thomas More remain behind in an empty and surprisingly romantic palace. Bessie becomes pregnant, causing Catherine further anguish due to Harry's seeming acceptance of the unborn child. Meg returns to Scotland to reclaim her crown and children but has to make peace with the new regent, John Stewart, the Duke of Albany. She also confronts her traitorous second husband, the Earl of Angus, and starts to think of ways to divorce him. Wolsey reveals he's been made a Cardinal by the Pope. The King of France dies, leaving King Harry's sister Mary the Dowager Queen of France, who secretly marries Charlie Brandon, much to King Harry's wrath. Bessie gives birth to a healthy son Henry FitzRoy whom Catherine presents to Harry.
14	"Field of Cloth of Gold"	Lisa Clarke	Kelly Jones	15 November 2020	0.234
June 1520. Catherine is jealous of Harry's blossoming relationship with his son by Bessie Blount. To strengthen England's alliance with France after the death of King Louis, Cardinal Wolsey plots to marry Princess Mary to the Dauphin of France. Catherine attempts to instead betroth Princess Mary to the new King of Spain and her nephew, Charles. Meg faces off again with her estranged husband the Earl of Angus, leading her to seek an end to their marriage. A great gathering in France is the backdrop to a political stand-off between Catherine and Cardinal Wolsey, with Catherine championing Charles and Wolsey championing Francis. King Francis demands a high dowry, questioning Catherine's former marriage to Prince Arthur, believing pre-adolescent Princess Mary is not a "true Princess" as a result. After taking advice from her old lady Rosa, Catherine begins bonding more with her daughter and is determined to educate her for her role as future Queen of England. Meanwhile, in London, men who are unhappy with the King and the current state of things lead riots throughout the city. Oviedo vows to protect Lina and his family during the unrest while also blaming the King for the riots. King Harry decides who he will give Princess Mary to in marriage and Catherine convinces the King to show mercy to the rioters after revealing she's pregnant.
15	"Faith"	Rebecca Gatward	Simon Tyrrell & Matthew Graham	22 November 2020	0.290
Early 1521 – 17 May 1521. Catherine implores King Harry to allow Princess Mary to succeed Harry as Queen, but he prefers their potential unborn son as the heir. Meg continues seeking a way to end her marriage to Angus, who in turn, seeks help from King Harry. Harry opines that the Pope could legally end his sister's marriage and Catherine in turn lends support to Angus by implying that Meg and the Duke of Albany are lovers and thus immorally motivated to end her marriage. Meanwhile, a new religion is rising, as are tensions within London and the court. Being both Roman Catholics, Catherine suggests she and Cardinal Wolsey set aside their differences and join forces to stop the Protestant heretics. Fearing religious persecution of foreigners in England, Morisco Lina confronts Catherine over the future of England. Catherine angrily rejects Lina's opinion, claiming she's defending the true faith. Meg returns to London and is at odds with Catherine and Harry over her desire to end her marriage. Catherine miscarries her child, and is comforted by Lord Stafford. In a meeting of the court, Lord Stafford is the only holdout to persecution of the Protestants by requesting leniency. Cardinal Wolsey plots with Harry to "cleanse" the court, leading to Stafford's criminal trial; Wiltshire (Anne Boleyn's father) and Wolsey testify against Stafford. Maggie (Henry VIII's aunt) discovers Thomas More's torture chamber for Protestant heretics. Catherine attempts to influence an increasingly paranoid Harry to show mercy to Stafford, without success. Meanwhile, Oviedo and Lina contemplate leaving England.
16	"Peace"	Rebecca Gatward	Emma Frost & Matthew Graham	29 November 2020	0.315
1521 – 1525. Harry starts to lose himself to madness, accuses Catherine of killing their son and threatens to kill her while banishing Maggie from court. Catherine becomes increasingly desperate, leaning on her daughter and her faith. In Scotland, Meg continues to fight for her son's right to the throne of Scotland, reclaims custody of her sons from an exiled Albany and proclaims herself as Regent. Harry bestows honours upon his son by Bessie Blount. Catherine asks for her daughter Princess Mary to be honoured as the heir to which Harry says he's waiting to bestow that honour on his son. The King's sister Mary reveals to Catherine that the King now supports Meg's attempts to annul her marriage, leaving Catherine to wonder about her own fate as Anne Boleyn is introduced to Henry VIII. Maggie tells Harry the truth about Catherine and Arthur to regain her titles and an angry Harry questions Wolsey about divorce. Oviedo and Lina leave England for the Ottoman Empire. Meg starts getting closer to Henry Stewart and fires cannons at Angus when he tries to attack Scotland. Catherine finally confesses to a furious Harry about consummating her marriage with Arthur. At night, she follows Harry and sees him with Anne Boleyn. Catherine finally decides to take control of her future and tells Harry she and Princess Mary will live away from court, but she will always be his wife. As she leaves, she tells Anne Boleyn she will never be Queen. In a letter to Mary, Catherine voices her hope that one day Mary will be Queen of England.

== Production ==
=== Development ===
On 15 March 2018, it was announced that Starz had greenlit the production. Emma Frost and Matthew Graham were set to serve as showrunners in addition to executive producing alongside Colin Callender, Scott Huff, Charlie Pattinson, and Charlie Hampton. Production companies All3 Media's New Pictures and Playground were expected to be involved.

On 17 May 2018, it was reported that the first two episodes would be directed by Birgitte Stærmose and that most episodes in the series would be directed by women.

On 3 June 2019, Starz announced that the series would return for another eight episodes and that Graham and Frost "always intended for The Spanish Princess to span 16 episodes, but they wrote a natural stopping place after the first eight just in case." Part two would be broadcast in 2020, with stars Charlotte Hope and Ruairi O'Connor returning to the show as Catherine and Henry, "along with other key cast." It was confirmed on 9 June 2019, by showrunner Emma Frost, that both Georgie Henley and Olly Rix, who portray Meg Tudor and Edward Stafford, would return for the next eight episodes and that Meg's role would be "huge in the back eight" and that "we are totally with her story, we're up in Scotland, we're sort of Spanish Princess meets Outlander" and that Stafford would get some "redemption." Richard Pepper's agent confirmed, on 8 May 2020, that he would return as Thomas Boleyn, Earl of Wiltshire. Jordan Renzo's return as Charles Brandon was confirmed by the part two teaser trailer on 7 May 2020 and Laura Carmichael's return was confirmed in an interview done by Emma Frost and Matthew Graham; the same interview confirmed that part two would "move around from France to England to Scotland a lot more and tell three interconnected stories."

=== Casting ===
Alongside the directing announcement, it was confirmed that Charlotte Hope, Stephanie Levi-John, Angus Imrie, Harriet Walter, Laura Carmichael, Ruairi O'Connor, Georgie Henley, Elliot Cowan, Alexandra Moen, Philip Cumbus, Nadia Parkes, Aaron Cobham, Alan McKenna, Richard Pepper, Olly Rix, Jordan Renzo, Daniel Cerqueira, and Alicia Borrachero had been cast in the series.

=== Filming ===
Principal photography for the series commenced on 15 May 2018, at Wells Cathedral in Wells, Somerset. Filming concluded in October 2018.

Principal photography for part two commenced on 26 September 2019 and finished on 11 March 2020, one day before lockdown due to COVID-19. Some filming took place at Mendip Hills, which doubled for Flodden Field.

== Release ==
On 20 December 2018, a "first look" still image from the series was released. On 25 January 2019, a teaser trailer for the series was released.

On 7 March 2019, the series was given a 5 May 2019, premiere date. On 10 September 2020, the trailer for part two was released; the eight-episode installment premiered on 11 October 2020.

== Reception ==
=== Critical response ===
The series received mixed to positive reviews in the United States. On the review aggregator website Rotten Tomatoes, part one of the series has an approval rating of 75% based on 12 reviews, with an average rating of 7.13/10. The website's critical consensus reads, "The Spanish Princess blends soapy melodrama with beautifully rendered historical set-pieces to paint a rounder — if still not fully realized — portrait of an often overlooked queen." Metacritic, which uses a weighted average, assigned a score of 73 out of 100 based on six critics, indicating "generally favorable reviews".

In Spain, the series caused curiosity upon release, but later received a combination of hard criticisms and tired indifference. It was accused of "wild historical inaccuracy", and has been described by various media as "insulting", "offensive", and "as full of stereotyping as sadly expected". The newspaper ABC wrote that it "invents and humiliates [Catherine's] history." The newspaper 20minutos and the TV guide by eldiario.es both call it "one of the worst shows about Spanish history."

=== Ratings ===
Viewership and ratings per episode of The Spanish Princess
No.	Title	Air date	Rating (18–49)	Viewers (millions)	DVR viewers (millions)	Total viewers (millions)
1	"The New World"	5 May 2019	0.05	0.393	—N/a	—N/a
2	"Fever Dream"	12 May 2019	0.05	0.398	0.464	0.862
3	"An Audacious Plan"	19 May 2019	0.07	0.456	0.503	0.959
4	"The Battle for Harry"	26 May 2019	0.07	0.500	0.556	1.056
5	"Heart Versus Duty"	2 June 2019	0.06	0.546	0.512	1.058
6	"A Polite Kidnapping"	9 June 2019	0.06	0.493	—N/a	—N/a
7	"All is Lost"	16 June 2019	0.06	0.509	0.560	1.069
8	"Destiny"	23 June 2019	0.05	0.528	0.481	1.010
9	"Camelot"	11 October 2020	0.04	0.252	—N/a	—N/a
10	"Flodden"	18 October 2020	0.02	0.173	—N/a	—N/a
11	"Grief"	25 October 2020	0.03	0.180	—N/a	—N/a
12	"The Other Woman"	1 November 2020	0.02	0.233	—N/a	—N/a
13	"Plague"	8 November 2020	0.03	0.221	—N/a	—N/a
14	"Field of Cloth of Gold"	15 November 2020	0.03	0.234	—N/a	—N/a
15	"Faith"	22 November 2020	0.04	0.290	—N/a	—N/a
16	"Peace"	29 November 2020	0.02	0.315	—N/a	—N/a

== Home media release ==
Volume(s)	DVD release date			Blu-ray release date	
Volume(s)	Region 1	Region 2	Region 4	Region A	Region B
Part 1	13 August 2019	12 August 2019	—N/a	13 August 2019	—N/a
Part 2	20 July 2021	19 July 2021	—N/a	—N/a	—N/a
