= Abduction of Chloe Ayling =

2017 crime in Italy

The abduction of Chloe Ayling occurred in July 2017 while Ayling, a British page 3 model, had travelled to Milan, Italy, for a fake photo-shoot. There, she was abducted by two people claiming to be members of a criminal organisation called The Black Death Group. In June 2018, Łukasz Herba, a Polish national from the United Kingdom, was convicted in a Milan court of the kidnapping and sentenced to 16 years and 9 months in prison.

== Abduction ==
Ayling, aged 20 at the time of the incident, was working in London for Phil Green's Supermodel Agency. In March 2017, Green, a lawyer and part-time DJ, brokered a photoshoot for Ayling, which was due to take place in Paris but was called off. Łukasz Herba, a 30-year-old Polish computer programmer from Oldbury, West Midlands, operating under the alias "Andre Lazio", developed a plan to organise a new photoshoot. In July 2017, Lazio contacted Green, requesting another attempt at the photoshoot, this time in Milan, on 12 July.

When Ayling did not return to the UK via Gatwick that night, her mother contacted Green. The next morning, Green received a ransom email, ostensibly from The Black Death Group and written by "MD" (another Herba alias) demanding €300,000 or else Ayling would be auctioned off as a sex slave on the dark web on 16 July. Green then contacted the UK consulate in Milan for support. Italian police then visited the address, which turned out not to be a photo studio at all. Inside, they found some of Ayling's clothes, and, in the absence of other evidence or emails, the investigation stalled. After six days, on Monday 17 July, Ayling and Herba turned up together at the Milan consulate, and suspicion quickly fell on the two after CCTV footage of them together in public emerged.

== Convictions ==
At his trial, the Italian court heard that Herba had injected Ayling with ketamine (as evidenced by an injection mark and traces of the drug in her hair), handcuffed her, put her in a holdall bag, and driven her in the boot of a car to a house in Viù near Turin. Throughout the kidnapping, Herba had used his MD alias to try to befriend Ayling by manipulating the events of the kidnapping and the fictional auction. Herba claimed in his defence that he had fallen in love with Ayling and was trying to promote her career by creating a scandal. On 11 June 2018, Herba was convicted of kidnapping and sentenced to 16 years and nine months in prison; Herba said in the closing statement of his trial that he was inspired after watching the movie By Any Means.

During the investigation, Herba's brother, Michał Konrad Herba was also arrested. Michał, who denied any involvement, allegedly participated in the kidnapping. Based on email and forensic evidence (his hair was found in the car's boot), he was extradited from the UK to Italy in October 2018. Michał was convicted in 2019 and sentenced to 16 years and 8 months in prison.

The sentence given to Łukasz Herba was reduced, in 2020, to 12 years and 1 month. In 2021, the sentence given to Michał Herba was reduced on appeal to 5 years and 8 months.

== Aftermath ==
The case brought attention to "The Black Death Group", an organisation alleged to exist in Eastern Europe and operating on the dark web over frequently-changing URLs. The group was investigated by Interpol in 2015. The group is known to have posted images of captives for sale; however, those postings are largely considered to be fake, since further investigation determined that they were taken from a pornographic film.

Ayling and Green both wrote memoirs of the events. The British media, in particular, were quick to suspect the kidnapping was a publicity stunt. Ayling has also been criticised in the media for leveraging the event for financial gain, and the benefit of her career.

In April 2023, BBC Three announced a new six-part drama based on the abduction, titled Kidnapped, written by Georgia Lester and made with Ayling's blessing. The series was broadcast on British television on 14 August 2024.

In August 2025, BBC Three screened a three-part documentary, titled "Chloe Ayling: My Unbelievable Kidnapping." In episode 3, Ayling is shown receiving a formal diagnosis of autism spectrum disorder, which she claimed added to speculation about her involvement.

== See also ==
- Amanda Knox
- John Paul Getty III
