= The Taming of the Queen =

2015 novel by Philippa Gregory

- UK first edition cover
- Author: Philippa Gregory
- Language: English
- Series: Tudor Series
- Genre: Historical novel
- Publisher: Simon & Schuster
- Publication date: 13 August 2015
- Publication place: United Kingdom
- Media type: Print (Hardcover); E-book
- Pages: 400
- ISBN: 978-1-4711-3297-1
- Preceded by: The Other Queen

The Taming of the Queen is a historical novel by British author Philippa Gregory, published on 13 August 2015. It tells the story of Kateryn Parr, the last wife of Henry VIII of England.

== Plot ==
Henry VIII of England chooses Kateryn Parr, a 31-year-old widow, as his new wife. Aware of the ends that Henry's other wives met, Kateryn is a studious woman who promotes projects, including advocating for Scriptures in English and supporting the Protestant Reformation. Henry has gout and a leg wound that will not heal throughout the novel. Parr ensures Princess Mary and Princess Elizabeth are re-legitimized by the crown.
