= Birgitte Stærmose =

Danish film director

Birgitte Stærmose Mortensen
- Born: 1963 (age 62–63); Odense, Denmark
- Occupations: Film director, screenwriter

Birgitte Stærmose Mortensen is a Danish film director and screenwriter.

== Career ==
She studied film at the University of Copenhagen and got a MFA in Film and Media Arts from Temple University, Philadelphia, in 1997. Her debut short Now, look at me, released in 2001, won the Audience award at Hamptons International Film Festival.

Her next work Small avalanches, a short film based on a story by Joyce Carol Oates, won the Stærmose UIP Prize for Best European Short at Edinburgh IFF 2003 and was nominated for Best European Short at the European Film Awards. Another short movie by Stærmose, Sophie, premiered at Sundance in 2007, was selected for New Directors / New Films at MOMA in NYC and was awarded the ARTE prize at Dresden International FF.

Her 2009 Out of love (2009 film) short movie won at Berlinale in the Generation section 14plus Kurzfilm. The picture is based on monologues of street children in the aftermath of the Kosovo war. Stærmose first recorded her protagonists, and then switched the lines, filming the kids “performing” lines originally spoken by someone else. She also ensured the children were paid directly for their work. Out of love won awards including Prix EFA at Rotterdam International Film Festival.

Her feature debut, Room 304 drama, premiered internationally in the main competition at Karlovy Vary IFF 2011. It won Special Mention of the Jury for Best Music. The movie brought Stærmose Best Director award at the Aubagne Film Festival in 2013.

Stærmose presented Afterwar, a feature-length sequel to Out of Love, in the Panorama section of the 2024 Berlin Film Festival. Combining documentary and fiction, the movie followed individuals who survived the postwar years and the Covid-19 pandemic. The film brought her Best Director award at Artdocfest Riga 2025 and the Best Film award at the 8th Euro-Balkan Film Festival.

== Selected filmography ==
=== Documentaries ===
- Barnepigerne (2020)

=== Shorts ===
- Out of love (2009 film)
- Principles of Attraction
- Small Avalanches (2003)
- Now, look at me (2001)

=== Feature films ===
- Afterwar (2024)
- Camino (2023)
- Room 304 (2011)

=== TV Series ===
- Industry (2022, HBO)
- The English Game (2020, Netflix)
- The Spanish Princess (2019)
- Darling (2017)
- Norskov (2015)
