= Stephen Woolfenden =

British television director

- Born: Stephen Mark Woolfenden; 25 April 1966 (age 60); Stratford-upon-Avon, Warwickshire, England, UK
- Occupations: Director; Second Unit Director
- Years active: 1986–present
- Spouse: Chyna Thomson (m. 1999)
- Children: 2

Stephen Woolfenden is a British television director. He previously worked as a second unit director for the Harry Potter films. He has directed other TV shows and recently the Doctor Who episode "Nightmare in Silver". He has more recently worked as the second unit director on The Legend of Tarzan film.

== Background ==
Woolfenden is the son of English composer and conductor Guy Woolfenden.

== Filmography ==
=== Television ===
Year	Title	Notes
2004–2005	The Mysti Show	8 episodes
2005	Dream Team	1 episode
2008	Echo Beach	3 episodes
2009	Trinity	3 episodes
2013	Doctor Who	2 episodes Clarence and the Whispermen; Nightmare in Silver
2013	Strike Back	2 episodes
2014	DCI Banks	2 episodes
2014	Crossing Lines	1 episode
2016	Beowulf: Return to the Shieldlands	2 episodes
2017	The Halcyon	2 episodes
2017	Poldark	3 episodes
2019	The Spanish Princess	2 episodes
2019–2020	Outlander	5 episodes
2021	Fate: The Winx Saga	2 episodes
2022	Willow	2 episodes (also producer)
2023	Joe Pickett	2 episodes
2025	SAS: Rogue Heroes	Series 2
