= Pole (surname) =

The surname Pole usually derives from "Pool", a person associated with a body of water.

The Welsh de la Poles descended from Gruffydd ap Gwenwynwyn take their name from the previous association with the place Welshpool. The link between the knightly de la Poles of Wales (pre-1300), and William de la Pole (Chief Baron of the Exchequer), of Hull and his descendants, is uncertain and unproven. It is presented as fact in some genealogies (See Parentage of William de la Pole (d.1366)). Additionally some medieval contemporaries may have been unrelated to either family.

This surname is popular in India as well.

== Pole ==
- Sir Charles Pole, 1st Baronet (1757–1830), English naval officer and colonial governor
- Dick Pole (born 1950), former Major League Baseball player and current coach
- Edward Tudor-Pole (born 1955), a British singer and actor
- Esa Pole (born 2001), American football player
- Sir Felix Pole (1877–1956), British railway manager and industrialist
- George Pole, Conservative Party (UK) member and activist, Chairman of the Conservative Monday Club 1970-1972
- Sir Geoffrey Pole (1502–1558), Knight
- Henry Pole, 1st Baron Montagu (c. 1492-1539)
- Hilary Pole (1938-1975), writer and POSSUM user
- Leon Pole (1871–1951), Australian artist
- Margaret Pole, Countess of Salisbury, née of Clarence (1473–1541), daughter of George Plantagenet (brother of Edward IV and Richard III of England)
- Reginald Pole (1500–1558), Cardinal, Archbishop of Canterbury
- Richard Pole (disambiguation), the name of some prominent English noblemen
- Ursula Pole, Baroness Stafford (c. 1504-1570), wife of Henry Stafford, 1st Baron Stafford
- Wellesley Tudor Pole (1884–1964), English author
- William Wellesley-Pole, 3rd Earl of Mornington, GCH, PC (1763–1845), British politician and elder brother of the Duke of Wellington
- William Pole (1814–1900), English engineer
- Prashant Pole - From India. Engineer and Writer, Author of various books, including 'Treasure Trove of Indian Knowledge', 'Those Fifteen Days' etc.

== de la Pole ==
- Alice de la Pole, née Chaucer (1404–1475), wife of William de la Pole, 1st Duke of Suffolk
- Edmund de la Pole (disambiguation), the name of some prominent English noblemen
- Griffith de la Pole (d. c. 1286), the English name of Welsh Gruffydd ap Gwenwynwyn
- Joan Oldcastle, 4th Baroness Cobham, née de la Pole (d. 1433/1434)
- John de la Pole (disambiguation), the name of some prominent English noblemen
- Michael de la Pole (disambiguation), the name of some prominent English noblemen
- Owen de la Pole (c. 1257 - c. 1293), 1st Lord of Powys, son of Griffith de la Pole
- William de la Pole (disambiguation), the name of some prominent English noblemen

== See also ==
- Pole Baronets
