= Richard Pole (courtier) =

English courtier (1462–1504)

Sir Richard Pole KG
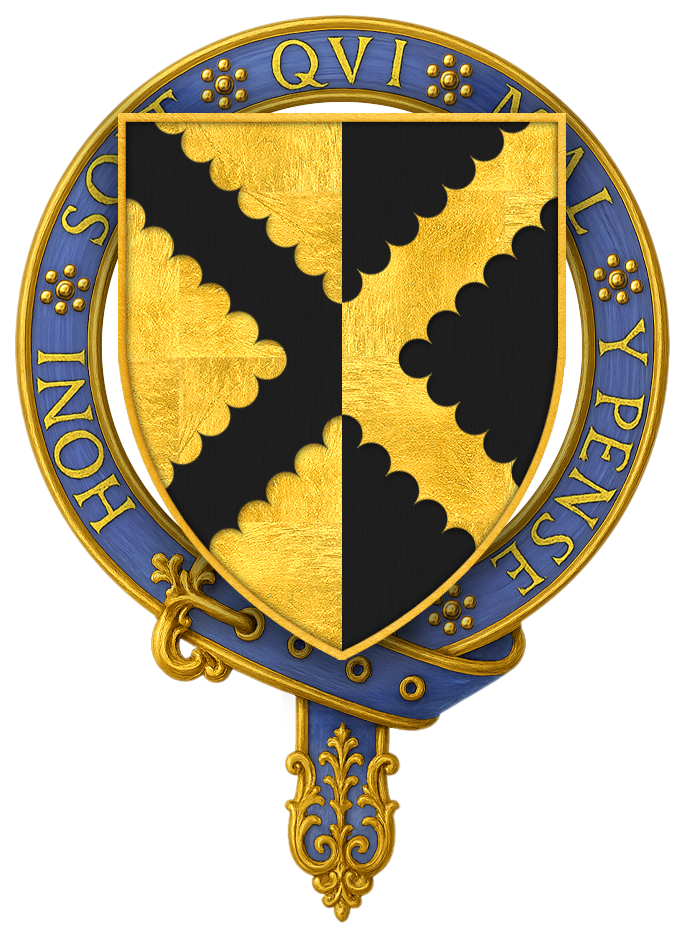
- Arms of Sir Richard Pole, KG: Per pale or and sable, a saltire engrailed counterchanged
- Born: 1462
- Died: October 1504 (aged 41–42)
- Spouse: Margaret Plantagenet (m. 1487)
- Children: Henry Pole, 1st Baron Montagu; Arthur Pole; Reginald Pole, Archbishop of Canterbury; Geoffrey Pole; Ursula Pole, Baroness Stafford
- Parent(s): Sir Geoffrey Pole; Edith St John

Sir Richard Pole, KG (1462 – October 1504) was a supporter and first cousin of King Henry VII of England. He was created a Knight of the Garter and was married to Margaret Plantagenet, a member of the House of York. The marriage reinforced the Tudor alliance between the houses of York and Lancaster.

== Family ==
A descendant of an ancient Welsh family, Sir Richard was a landed gentleman of Buckinghamshire, the son of Geoffrey Pole, Esquire of Worrell, Cheshire, and of Wythurn in Medmenham, Buckinghamshire (1431 – 1474 / 4 January 1479, interred in Bisham Abbey). His mother was Edith St John, daughter of Sir Oliver St John of Bletso, Bedfordshire (d. 1437) and the half-sister of Lady Margaret Beaufort, mother of Henry VII. They shared the same mother, Margaret Beauchamp of Bletso, who had married three times; this made Richard a first cousin of the half blood to Henry VII. Sir Richard was thus first cousin of Alice St John, wife of Henry Parker, 10th Baron Morley and mother of Jane Parker, wife of George Boleyn, Viscount Rochford.

His sister Eleanor married Ralph Verney and was a lady in waiting to Elizabeth of York and Margaret Tudor.

== Tudor rule ==
Henry VII gave him various offices in Wales: he was Constable of Harlech and Montgomery Castles and the High Sheriff of Merionethshire. In 1495 Pole raised men against the rebellion of Perkin Warbeck.

Sir Richard Pole was "a valiant and expert commander" first retained to serve Henry VII in the wars of Scotland in 1497 with five demi-lancers and 200 archers, and shortly afterwards with 600 men-at-arms, 60 demi-lancers, and 540 bows and bills.

King Henry later made him Chief Gentleman of the Privy Chamber to Arthur, Prince of Wales. Pole was invested as a Knight of the Garter on April 1499. After Prince Arthur married Catherine of Aragon in 1501 Pole accompanied them to Ludlow Castle where Arthur took his role as President of the Council of Wales and the Marches. Pole was later given responsibility for the Welsh Marches. He also had the daunting task of meeting with the Council of Wales and the Marches on how best to inform the king of his much-loved eldest son's death on 2 April 1502.

== Marriage ==
He married Margaret Plantagenet, daughter of George Plantagenet, 1st Duke of Clarence and Isabel Neville, Duchess of Clarence, between 1491 and 1494, perhaps on 22 September 1494. However, their eldest son Henry was born in 1492, making 1491 the likely date of marriage. On the topic of the marriage, William Shakespeare wrote "His [The Duke of Clarence's] daughter meanly have I match'd in marriage." and Horace Walpole wrote in his correspondence, "Henry had married her to the insignificant Sir Richard Pole who is called a Welsh Knight". Sir Richard Pole may have been chosen by King Henry VII as husband for his wife's cousin Margaret on the basis that he was "safe" because his mother was a half-sister of Henry's own mother, Margaret Beaufort, Countess of Richmond—that is, one of the St Johns—and her mother in turn was a Beauchamp.

He died in October 1504.

== Issue ==
He and his wife had five children:

- Henry Pole, 1st Baron Montagu (c. 1492 – 9 January 1539), most famous as one of the peers in the trial of Anne Boleyn; married Jane Neville, daughter of George Neville, 5th Baron Bergavenny and Lady Joan Arundel. Henry Pole, his wife and his mother were beheaded by Henry VIII. A great-grandson of Henry Pole was Sir John Bourchier, a regicide of beheaded King Charles I of England – a great-great-grandnephew of Henry VIII.
- Reginald Pole (c. 1500 – 17 November 1558), cardinal, papal legate in various regions, including England, and the Roman Catholic Archbishop of Canterbury.
- Sir Geoffrey Pole (c. 1501 or 1502 – 1558), Lord of the manor of Lordington in Sussex, suspected of treason by King Henry VIII and accused of conspiring with Charles V, Holy Roman Emperor; lived in exile in Europe; married Constance Pakenham, daughter and heiress of Sir John Pakenham. John Pakenham was an ancestor of Sir Edward Pakenham, brother-in-law of Arthur Wellesley, 1st Duke of Wellington.
- Sir Arthur Pole (c. 1502 – 1535), Lord of the manor of Broadhurst in Sussex; married Jane Lewkenor, daughter of Sir Roger Lewknor and the former Eleanor Tuchet, herself daughter of the 6th Baron Audley and the former Anne Echingham.
- Lady Ursula Pole, Baroness Stafford (c. 1504 – 12 August 1570), married the 1st Baron Stafford.
