= Arthur Pole =

Arthur Pole is the name of:

- Arthur Pole (courtier) (1499–1532), English knight
- Arthur Pole (conspirator) (1531–1570), nephew of the above

== See also ==
- Arthur Pohl (1900–1970) was a German screenwriter and film director
- Arthur Poole (disambiguation)
