= Arthur Pole (courtier) =

English knight and courtier

Sir Arthur Pole of Broadhurst, near Horsted Keynes in Sussex (1494–August 1528) was an English knight.

== Life ==
Arthur was the second son of Margaret Pole, 8th Countess of Salisbury (godmother to Queen Mary I) and Sir Richard Pole. His younger brother, Cardinal Reginald Pole, became the last Catholic Archbishop of Canterbury under Mary. His eldest brother was Henry Pole, 1st Baron Montagu.

Arthur started his career in at court in 1514, travelling to France with King Henry VIII's sister Mary when she was wed to Louis XII. Distinguishing himself on the jousting field in 1516, he soon became a squire of the king's body. He was then elevated to Gentleman of the Bedchamber to King Henry in 1518. Arthur was among the courtiers who traveled to France for the Field of the Cloth of Gold in May 1520 where he earned prizes as a member of Henry Courtney, Earl of Devon's team.

Arthur was knighted by Charles Brandon, 1st Duke of Suffolk at Roye in November 1523 while both he and Lord Montagu were on campaign against the French. He was also the Lord of the manor of Broadhurst, Sussex.

== Marriage and family ==
Arthur married before 24 October 1522 Jane Lewkenor (b. 1492), widow of Sir Christopher Pickering of Ellerton (b. 1490 in Sedbergh, Yorkshire and d. 7 September 1516 in Woodbridge, Suffolk), whom she married before 1516. Jane was the daughter of Sir Roger Lewkenor (b. 1469 and d. 15 January 1543 in Trotton, Sussex) of Trotton, Sussex—a paternal grandson of Sir Roger Lewknor and Alianora de Camoys—and wife Eleanor Tuchet, daughter of John Tuchet, 6th Baron Audley and 3rd Baron Tuchet and Anne Echingham.

The couple had at least four children: Henry, Mary b. (1529) who married Sir John Stanley, Jane, and Margaret (b. 1527) who married Sir John Fitz-Herbert.

Historian Hazel Pierce has suggested that Arthur may have died of the sweating sickness in 1528. He died at some point before his widow entered into a marriage contract with her next husband in August 1532. Arthur was buried at Bisham Abbey.

When Arthur died, his mother and brother, Lady Salisbury and her son, Lord Montagu, did not wish Jane to remarry, which would deprive the Pole family, and Arthur's heirs, of her fortune. They coerced Jane to become a novice. Jane was eventually released from her vows by William Barlow, the new Bishop of St. Asaph, who was residing in his priory of Bisham. She said to Bishop Barlow, 'Can I leave the veil at pleasure?'; 'Yes, for all religious persons have a time of probation. You are only a novice and could leave your nun's weeds at your pleasure. I bind you no further...', he said. Jane then married Sir William Barentyne (b. 31 December 1481–d. 17 November 1549). The Barentynes sought an Act of Parliament to declare their children legitimate in 1543 after the passage of the Act of the Six Articles. She died before 12 March 1562/63.
