= Cardinal Pole (novel) =

1863 novel

- Author: William Harrison Ainsworth
- Language: English
- Genre: Historical
- Publisher: Chapman and Hall
- Publication date: 1863
- Publication place: United Kingdom
- Media type: Print
- Preceded by: The Tower of London

Cardinal Pole is an 1863 historical novel by the British author William Harrison Ainsworth. After being serialised in Bentley's Miscellany it was published in three volumes by Chapman and Hall. It set during the mid-sixteenth century and revolves around cardinal Reginald Pole during the reign of Mary I of England. It functions as an effective sequel to the author's 1840 novel The Tower of London.

== Bibliography ==
- Carver, Stephen James. The Life and Works of the Lancashire Novelist William Harrison Ainsworth, 1850-1882. Edwin Mellen Press, 2003.
- Mitchell, Rosemary. Picturing the Past: English History in Text and Image, 1830-1870. OUP Oxford, 2000.
- Schutte, Valerie & Hower, Jessica S. (ed.) Mid-Tudor Queenship and Memory: The Making and Re-making of Lady Jane Grey and Mary I. Springer Nature, 2023.
