= Thomas Starkey =

Thomas Starkey (c. 1498–1538) was an English political theorist, humanist, and royal servant.

== Life ==
Starkey was born in Cheshire, probably at Wrenbury, to Thomas Starkey and Maud Mainwaring. His father likely held office in Wales and was wealthy enough to pay for his son's education. His mother, Maud, was a daughter of Sir John Mainwaring, one of the wealthiest men in the palatinate.

He attended the University of Oxford and gained an MA at Magdalen College in 1521. He went to Padua with Thomas Lupset in 1523. Here he studied the works of Aristotle and admired the government of Venice. By 1529 he had entered the service of Reginald Pole as secretary. Together with Pole, Starkey went to Avignon in 1532 where he studied civil law, before returning to Padua.

Starkey returned to England in late 1534 and caught the eye of Thomas Cromwell, chief minister to Henry VIII, in early 1535. Cromwell used Starkey to handle intelligence from Italy and as a royal propagandist.

His deep ties to Reginald Pole proved somewhat detrimental to his career, especially after a manuscript of Pole's De unitate, a savage attack on Henry VIII, arrived in England in 1536. These same ties to Pole and his family made him a subject of investigation in the 1538 Exeter Conspiracy. He died on 25 August 1538, perhaps of plague.

== Works ==
Between 1529 and 1532 Starkey wrote his A Dialogue between Pole and Lupset, later known as Starkey's England. Cast as a dialogue between Reginald Pole and Thomas Lupset, the Dialogue is one of the most significant works of political thought written in English in the first half of the sixteenth century. In 1536 he published An Exhortation to the People instructing them to Unity and Obedience, a defence of Royal Supremacy and commissioned by Thomas Cromwell.
