= Robert Brancetour =

16th-century English merchant

Robert Brancetour was a 16th-century English merchant who was a member of the court of Charles V, Holy Roman Emperor. He was attainted by Henry VIII who repeatedly tried to have Brancetour arrested, but was thwarted by Charles V's protection. Brancetour was an associate of Cardinal Pole.

He is said to have been the first Englishman to travel to Safavid Persia.
