= Margaret Pole, Countess of Salisbury =

English noblewoman and peeress (1473–1541)

Margaret Plantagenet
- Countess of Salisbury
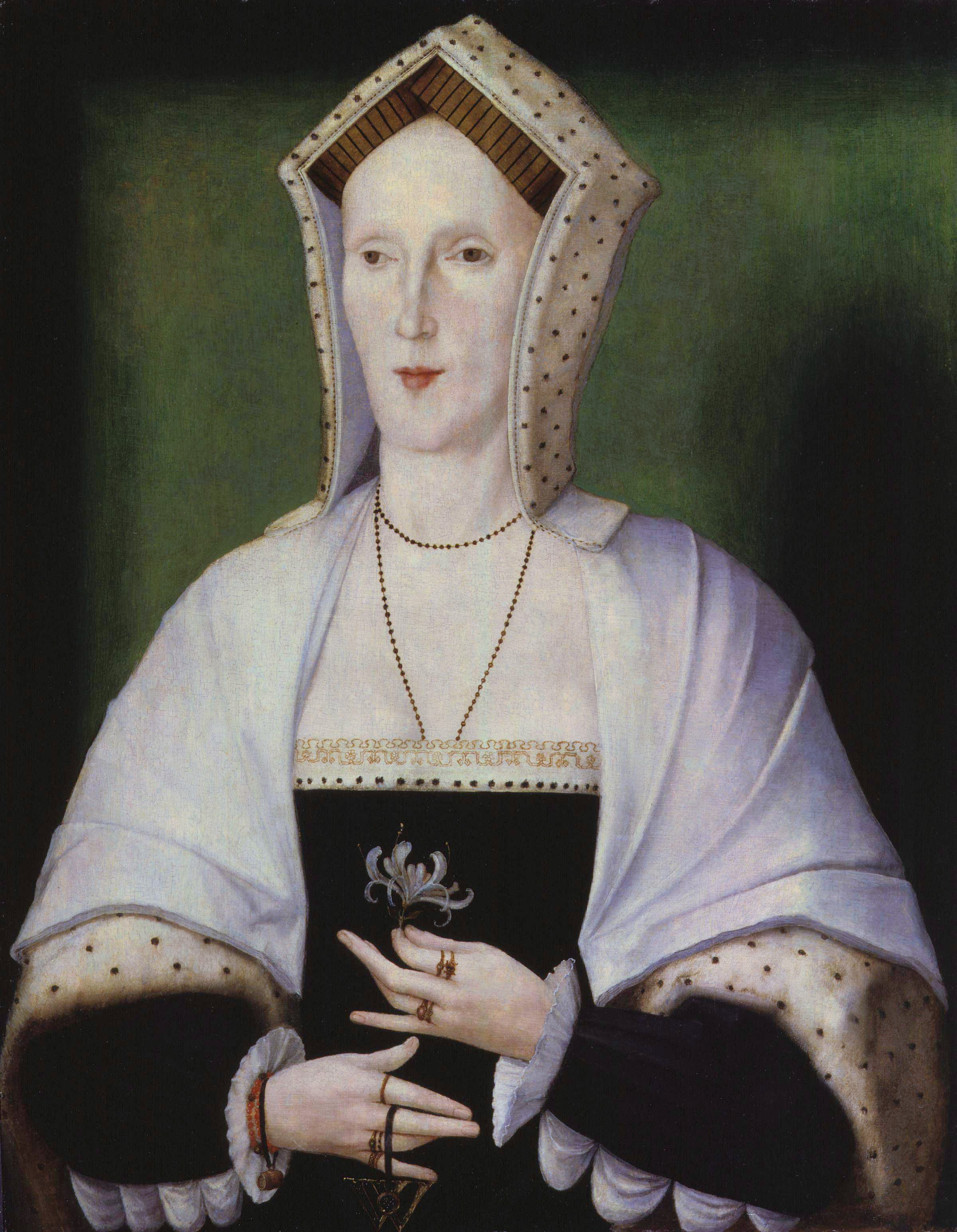
- Portrait of an unknown woman, often identified as the Countess of Salisbury
- Born: 14 August 1473; Farleigh Hungerford Castle, Somerset, England
- Died: 27 May 1541 (aged 67); Tower of London, London, England
- Burial: Church of St Peter ad Vincula, Tower of London, England
- Spouse: Sir Richard Pole (m. 1487; died 1504)
- Issue: Henry Pole, 1st Baron Montagu; Arthur Pole; Ursula Pole, Baroness Stafford; Reginald Pole, Archbishop of Canterbury; Geoffrey Pole
- House: York
- Father: George Plantagenet, Duke of Clarence
- Mother: Isabel Neville

Blessed Margaret Plantagenet

Martyr
- Cause of death: Beheading
- Venerated in: Catholic Church (England)
- Beatified: 29 December 1886, St. Peter's Basilica, Rome, Kingdom of Italy, by Pope Leo XIII

Margaret Plantagenet, Countess of Salisbury (14 August 1473 – 27 May 1541), was the only surviving daughter of George Plantagenet, Duke of Clarence (a brother of Kings Edward IV and Richard III), and his wife Isabel Neville. As a result of Margaret's marriage to Richard Pole, she was also known as Margaret Pole. She was one of just two women in 16th-century England to be a peeress in her own right (suo jure) without a husband in the House of Lords.

One of the few members of the House of Plantagenet to have survived the Wars of the Roses, Margaret was executed in 1541 at the command of King Henry VIII, the second monarch of the House of Tudor, who was the son of her first cousin, Elizabeth of York. Pope Leo XIII beatified her as a martyr for the Catholic Church on 29 December 1886. One of her sons, Reginald Pole, was the last Catholic Archbishop of Canterbury.

== Early life ==
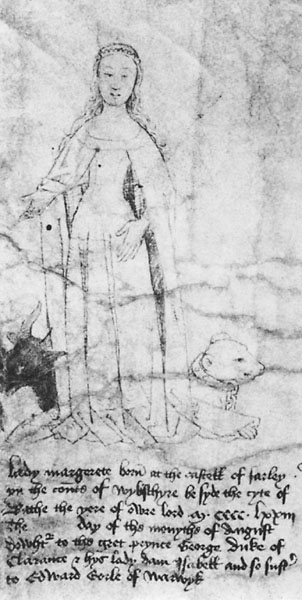
Margaret in her youth

Margaret was born at Farleigh Castle in Somerset. She was the only surviving daughter of George Plantagenet, Duke of Clarence, and his wife Isabel Neville. George was a son of Richard of York, 3rd Duke of York, and a brother of both Edward IV and Richard III. Isabel was the elder daughter and coheiress of Richard Neville, 16th Earl of Warwick ("Warwick the Kingmaker"), and his wife Anne Beauchamp, 16th Countess of Warwick.

Warwick was killed fighting against Margaret's uncles at the Battle of Barnet. Her father, already Duke of Clarence, was then created Earl of Salisbury and of Warwick. Edward IV declared that Margaret's younger brother, Edward, should be known as Earl of Warwick, but only as a courtesy title, and no peerage was ever created for him. Margaret would have had a claim to the Earldom of Warwick, but the earldom was forfeited on the attainder of her brother Edward. She was most likely named after her paternal aunt Margaret of York, Duchess of Burgundy.

Isabel died suddenly on 22 December 1476, when Margaret was only three years old. Two months earlier she had given birth to a son, Richard (who would only outlive her by a year). The death of his wife led Clarence to believe that her lady-in-waiting and midwife, Ankarette Twynho, and a servant, had poisoned her and his son with a "venomous drink of ale". He had them brought to trial, found guilty and executed on very slim evidence by a rigged court in April 1477. His grief over his wife's death, and the midwife having been a distant cousin of the Woodvilles, suggested by his sister-in-law Elizabeth Woodville, made him distance himself from his brother, Edward IV.

The Duke of Clarence plotted against Edward IV, and in February 1478 was attainted and executed for treason. His lands and titles were thereby forfeited. Edward IV died in 1483 when Margaret was ten. The following year, the late King's marriage was declared invalid by the statute Titulus Regius, making his children illegitimate. As Margaret and her brother, Edward, were debarred from the throne by their father's attainder, their uncle, Richard, Duke of Gloucester, became King Richard III in 1483. He reinforced young Margaret and Edward's exclusion from the line of succession, and married Anne Neville, Margaret's maternal aunt. In 1484, Margaret and her brother were residing in the King's Northern estates in the care of their aunt. Pole learned how to play the virginals as a child.

In 1485, Richard III was defeated and killed at the Battle of Bosworth by Henry Tudor, who succeeded him as Henry VII. The new King married Margaret's cousin, Elizabeth of York, Edward IV's eldest daughter. Margaret and her brother were taken into their care as wards of the crown. They lived with the King's mother, Margaret Beaufort, Countess of Richmond, and Margaret is recorded as attending the christening of the King's and Queen's first child, Arthur Tudor, Prince of Wales, in Winchester during September 1486.

The new Tudor King suspected anyone with blood ties to the Plantagenets as coveting the throne, and as young Edward was the last male Plantagenet and a potential House of York claimant, he was moved to the Tower of London in 1485. Edward was briefly displayed in public at St Paul's Cathedral in 1487 in response to the presentation of the impostor Lambert Simnel as the "Earl of Warwick" to the Irish lords. When Perkin Warbeck impersonated Edward IV's presumed-dead son, Richard of Shrewsbury, 1st Duke of York, in 1499, Margaret's brother Edward was attainted and executed. His lands and titles were confiscated.

== Marriage ==
Margaret remained important to the new Tudor dynasty due to her Yorkist lineage and unquestionably royal blood. When she was 14 years old, Henry VII arranged her marriage to his favoured cousin and loyal servant, Richard Pole, who was 11 years her senior and from a gentry family. Whilst Richard's mother Edith St. John was an older half-sister of the King's mother, Margaret Beaufort, making him from a Lancastrian supporting family, he was of a lower status compared to his new wife. It has been argued by historians such as Tracy Borman that this was intended to undermine her status, weaken her claim to the English throne and ensure that she was married to a loyal supporter. Horace Walpole later reflected in his correspondence that "Henry had married her to the insignificant Sir Richard Pole who is called a Welsh Knight". Nevertheless, the King and Queen attended the marriage ceremony. Historians debate the date of the marriage; it may have taken place in 1487 or 1491.

After the marriage, Margaret lived at her husband's manor of Bockmer, Buckinghamshire and gave birth to five children. She was in attendance at court for important events such as at the Feast of St George in April 1488.

Margaret's husband Richard prospered under the Tudor regime and held various offices in Henry VII's government. He was appointed as a Knight of the Garter in 1499, and he was entrusted with the prestigious role of Chamberlain for Arthur, Prince of Wales, the heir apparent to the throne. Around the time when Richard was appointed Arthur's Chamberlain, Margaret received a generous gift of £20 from Henry VII.

When the Prince of Wales married the Spanish Infanta Catherine of Aragon in 1501, they established an independent household at Ludlow Castle. Margaret was appointed as one of Catherine's ladies-in-waiting. Despite a ten-year difference in age, she and the Princess became loyal friends. The friendship lasted throughout their whole lives and they exchanged frequent correspondence. Margaret held her position until Catherine's entourage was dissolved, after Arthur died on 2 April 1502.

== Widowhood ==
Richard Pole died of an illness in 1505, leaving Margaret a widow with five young children. She borrowed £40 from Henry VII to pay for Pole's funeral, with Charles Somerset, 1st Earl of Worcester, standing in surety for the loan. She had a small estate of land inherited from her husband but her jointure provided little income or means of supporting herself and her children.

She took lodgings at Syon Abbey, on the banks of the River Thames, along with her daughter Ursula and youngest son Geoffrey, as guests of the Bridgettine nuns. To ease the difficult financial situation, her eldest sons were likely sent to other noble households. She devoted her third son, Reginald Pole, to the Church, relinquishing all financial responsibility for him and sending him to the Carthusian Monastery at Sheen to be educated with the monks of the Charterhouse. Margaret was also supported by monthly payments from the King's Mother from May 1505 until May 1509. She remained at Syon Abbey until Henry VIII came to the throne in 1509, and her fortunes improved.

== Countess of Salisbury ==
Henry VIII married Catherine of Aragon in 1509, and Margaret was once again appointed as one of Catherine's ladies-in-waiting. She attended to the new Queen during the coronation. Her son Henry was also immediately given a place in the King's household.

In July 1509, the King granted Margaret an annuity of £100 a year. Then on 4 February 1512, after Margaret's petition to the King, her brother's attainder was reversed and an Act of Parliament restored the Earldom of Salisbury to her. It included some of her brother's former land. Henry VII had controlled these lands while Margaret's brother was a minor and then during his imprisonment; he confiscated them after Edward's trial. She paid 5,000 marks (the mark had a value of 2/3 of a pound, thus £2,667) for the restoration of her lands, equivalent to £2,550,000 in 2025. These terms were generous when compared to the amounts other peers were made to pay for restoration of land.

Edward's Warwick and Spencer [Despencer] estates remained in the hands of the Crown, but Margaret now owned property in Calais, estates in Wales and 17 English counties, and the London palace Le Herber. In 1517, Margaret commissioned the building of Warblington Castle, Hampshire, which would become her principal seat. It was built in brick, was sumptuously furnished and had a moat. The King and Queen are known to have visited for extended periods and Henry VIII reportedly enjoyed the hunting there. She had many church livings under her control. She also commissioned a chantry at Christchurch Priory.

As Countess of Salisbury, she played an active role in administering her estates. By 1538 she was the fifth-richest peer in England and ranked among the most powerful tenants in-chief during Henry VIII's reign. She was a patron of the New Learning, like many Renaissance noblewomen. Gentian Hervet translated Erasmus' de immensa misericordia Dei (The Great Mercy of God) into English for her.

Margaret's lineage was continued through her five children, Henry, Ursula, Arthur, Reginald, and Geoffrey, who all rose to prominence. Her first son, Henry Pole, was created Baron Montagu in 1514, another of the Neville titles in its first creation, speaking for the family on Margaret's behalf in the House of Lords. His mother negotiated his marriage to the coheiress Jane Neville, daughter of Lord Bergavenny.

Her second son, Arthur Pole, had a successful career as a courtier, becoming one of the six Gentlemen of the Privy Chamber and one of the noblemen who accompanied the king's sister Mary Tudor to France for her marriage to King Louis XII in 1514. Arthur suffered a setback when his patron Edward Stafford, 3rd Duke of Buckingham, was convicted of treason in 1521 but was soon restored to favour. He died young (about 1526), having married Jane Pickering, the heiress of Roger Lewknor. Margaret and her son Henry pressed Arthur's widow to take a vow of perpetual chastity to preserve her inheritance for the Pole children.

Margaret's daughter Ursula married Henry Stafford, the only son of Edward Stafford, 3rd Duke of Buckingham and Lady Alianore Percy, in 1519. She was about 15 years old, and he was not yet 18 at the time of the marriage. After the Duke of Buckingham was beheaded for treason and posthumously attainted by an Act of Parliament in 1521, the couple were given only fragments of his estates. Ursula's husband was created 1st Baron Stafford by King Henry's son and successor, Edward VI in 1547. They had a total of seven sons and seven daughters.

Margaret's third son, Reginald Pole, was educated at Magdalen College, Oxford, and studied abroad at the University of Padua in Italy, with a £100 stipend from the king. He was Dean of Exeter and Wimborne Minster, Dorset, and a canon of York. He had several other livings, although he had not been ordained a priest. In 1529, he represented Henry VIII in Paris, persuading the theologians of the Sorbonne to support Henry's divorce from Catherine of Aragon. He was the last Roman Catholic Archbishop of Canterbury and Primate of All England.

Margaret's youngest son, Geoffrey Pole, married Constance, daughter of Edmund Pakenham, and inherited the estate of Lordington in Sussex.

Margaret's own favour at Court in these years varied. She received a New Year's gift from the King valued at forty shillings, which was equal to the value of gifts given to the Dukes of Buckingham and Norfolk. She also had a dispute over land with Henry VIII in 1518 when he awarded contested lands to the Dukedom of Somerset, which had been held by his Beaufort great-grandfather, and was then in the possession of the Crown.

== Governess to Mary Tudor ==
In 1516, Margaret became godmother of the King's and Queen's daughter Mary and stood sponsor for her confirmation. In 1520 she was also appointed as Lady governess to Mary, after Margaret Bryan, a position of great honour and prestige that solidified her as a powerful force for patronage. In July 1521, when her sons were caught up in the Duke of Buckingham's treason conviction, she was dismissed from her appointment and replaced by Amy Boleyn. It had been restored to her by 1525, when Margaret was reappointed governess to the Princess at Ludlow Castle in Shropshire. Margaret and the Princess spent the Christmases of 1529 and 1530 at court. During her time as governess, Margaret became like "a second mother" to Mary.

Margaret was initially amongst a group of high ranking noblewomen who openly opposed the King's divorce from Catherine of Aragon. Others were Mary Tudor, Duchess of Suffolk, the King's sister; Elizabeth Howard, Duchess of Norfolk; Gertrude Courtenay, Marchioness of Exeter; and Anne Grey, Baroness Hussey. This soured Margaret's relationship with Henry.

When Mary was declared illegitimate in 1533, Margaret refused to give Mary's gold plate and jewels back to the King. Mary's Chamberlain John Hussey, 1st Baron Hussey of Sleaford, wrote to Thomas Cromwell that “in no wyse she wyll as yete deliyver to Mistress Frances the jewells for anything that I can say or doo onlesse that yt may please you to obteyne the kings letters unto hyr in that behalf.”

Mary's household was broken up at the end of 1533 and Margaret asked if she could serve Mary at her own cost, but this was not permitted. When the Imperial Ambassador, Eustace Chapuys, suggested two years later that Mary be handed over to Margaret, Henry refused, calling Margaret "a fool, of no experience". She was also unwell for several months during this time, in her sickbed at Bisham. She eventually capitulated and accepted the King's annulment, the Act of Supremacy, and the Act of Succession, and her household were instructed to comply.

== Fall ==
In 1531, Margaret's son Reginald had warned of the risks if Henry should divorce Queen Catherine and marry Anne Boleyn. Chapuys suggested to Emperor Charles V that Reginald should marry Henry VIII's daughter Mary and combine their dynastic claims. Chapuys also communicated with Reginald through his brother, Geoffrey, who urged that, should the wedding take place, a popular uprising against Henry would follow.

In June 1536, Reginald definitively broke with the King. He replied to a letter that he had received from Henry VIII with a copy of his own pamphlet, pro ecclesiasticae unitatis defensione, commonly known as De unitate. The pamphlet denied both royal supremacy and Henry's position on marriage to a brother's wife, and referred to him as "a robber, murderer and greater enemy to Christianity than the Turk". This was a great offence to the King. Reginald also urged the princes of Europe to invade England and depose Henry immediately.

Margaret was summoned to the King's presence where he personally informed her of Reginald's treasonable actions. She consulted with her son Henry then wrote directly to Reginald, saying that she could not bear the King's wrath, strongly reproving him for his "folly", and advising him to "take another way and serve our master as thy bounden duty is to do unless thou wilt be the confusion of thy mother". She sent a copy of the letter to the King's council and retired from court. After Anne Boleyn was arrested and executed, Margaret was permitted to return to court, albeit briefly, to serve the new Queen Jane Seymour.

In 1537, Reginald was made a Cardinal, despite not being ordained a priest. Pope Paul III put him in charge of organising assistance for the Pilgrimage of Grace. The English government tried to assassinate him.

Margaret's son Geoffrey was arrested in August 1538. He had been corresponding with his brother Reginald and the investigation of Henry Courtenay, 1st Marquess of Exeter, and the so-called Exeter Conspiracy implicated him. Under interrogation, Geoffrey's nerve broke. He said that Exeter had been party to his correspondence with Reginald and he shared details about Henry, Lord Montagu's dislike of the King and his policies. Montagu, Exeter, and Margaret were all arrested in November 1538 as the entire Pole family became implicated in the treason. Margaret wrote of Geoffrey that, "I trow he is not so unhappy that he will hurt his mother, and yet I care neither for him, nor for any other, for I am true to my Prince."

Margaret was nevertheless accused of abetting her sons and of having “comytted and p[er]petrated div[er]se and sundry other detestable and abominable treasons.” She was interrogated for three days by William FitzWilliam, Earl of Southampton, and Thomas Thirlby, Bishop of Ely, while imprisoned at Cowdray House, Midhurst, West Sussex, which was Fitzwilliam's home. She defended herself against their accusations, and her interrogators reported to Cromwell that "We assure your lordship we have dealed with such a one as men have not dealed withal tofore [i.e. before] us; we may call her rather a strong and constant man, than a woman. For in all behaviour, howsoever we have used her, she hath showed herself so earnest, vehement, and precise that more could not be." She also denied receiving any treasonous letters from her sons, with the reports to Cromwell also stating that "..[either] her sons have not made her privy ne participant of the bottom and pit [of] their stomachs, or else is she the [most] arrant traitoress that ever [lived]." Lady Fitzwilliam refused to be in the home while Margaret was there, and Fitzwilliam himself pleaded with Cromwell to remove her from his custody. He wrote to him: "I beg you to rid me of her company, for she is both chargeable and troubles my mind."

In January 1539, Geoffrey was pardoned, but Montagu and Exeter were executed for treason after trial. The King convinced himself that he had escaped death by a narrow margin and informed Emperor Charles V that for ten years Exeter and Montagu had planned to murder him.

In May 1539, Margaret was attainted, as her father had been. The attainder meant that her titles and lands were forfeit, her Earldom was confiscated and she was demoted to the title of Lady Margaret Pole. Her estate, including Warblington Castle, was temporarily awarded to Sir Thomas Wriothesley, 1st Earl of Southampton and the king's personal secretary.

As part of the evidence for the bill of attainder, Cromwell produced an embroidered tunic bearing the Five Wounds of Christ, and heraldic symbols supposedly symbolising Margaret's support for the Church of Rome and the rule of her son Reginald with the King's Catholic daughter Mary. This had allegedly been found in her coffers at Warblington Castle.

Margaret was sentenced to death but was held in the Tower of London for two and a half years with her grandson Henry and Exeter's son. The King paid adequate sums for her maintenance including wages for a waiting woman. In March 1541, the King ordered warm gowns and footwear for her to wear. In 1540, Cromwell had also fallen from favour and was himself attainted and executed.

== Execution ==
On the morning of 27 May 1541, Margaret was told she would die within the hour. She answered that no crime had been attributed to her. Nevertheless, she was taken from her cell to the precincts of the Tower where a low wooden block had been prepared instead of the customary scaffold.

Two written eyewitness reports survived her execution: one by Charles de Marillac, the French ambassador, and the other by Chapuys, ambassador of the Holy Roman Emperor. The accounts differ somewhat. Marillac's report, dispatched two days afterwards, recorded that the execution took place with so few people present that, in the evening, news of her execution was doubted. Chapuys wrote two weeks after the execution that one hundred and fifty witnesses were present for the execution, including the Lord Mayor of London.

Chapuys wrote: "At first, when the sentence of death was made known to her, she found the thing very strange, not knowing of what crime she was accused, nor how she had been sentenced". Because the chief executioner had been sent north to deal with rebels, the execution was performed by "a wretched and blundering youth who hacked her head and shoulders to pieces in the most pitiful manner". It took eleven strokes of an axe for the executioner to remove her head. The first blow missed its mark, gashing her shoulder.

A third account in Burke's Peerage described the appalling circumstances of the execution. It states that Margaret refused to lay her head on the block, declaiming: "So should traitors do, and I am none". According to the account, she turned her head "every which way", instructing the executioner that, if he wanted her head, he should take it as he could.

Margaret was buried in the Chapel Royale of St Peter ad Vincula within the Tower of London. Her remains were rediscovered when the chapel was renovated in 1876.

The following poem was found carved on the wall of Margaret's cell:

"For traitors on the block should die;
I am no traitor, no, not I!
My faithfulness stands fast and so,
Towards the block I shall not go!
Nor make one step, as you shall see;
Christ in Thy Mercy, save Thou me!"

== Descendants ==
When not at Court, Margaret lived chiefly at Warblington Castle in Hampshire and Bisham Manor in Berkshire.

She and her husband were parents to five children:

- Henry Pole, 1st Baron Montagu (c. 1492 – 9 January 1539), notable as one of the peers in the trial of Anne Boleyn. He married Jane Neville, daughter and coheiress of George Nevill, 5th Baron Bergavenny, and Joan Fitzalan, and they had four children. He was beheaded by order of Henry VIII. A great-grandson of Henry Pole was Sir John Bourchier, one of the regicides of Charles I of England, who was a great-great-grandnephew of Henry VIII.
- Arthur Pole (before 1499 – before 1532), Lord of the manor of Broadhurst in Sussex. He married Jane Lewkenor, daughter of Sir Roger Lewkenor and Eleanor Tuchet, daughter of the John Tuchet, 6th Baron Audley and Anne Echingham. They had four children.
- Ursula Pole (c. 1502 – 12 August 1570), married Henry Stafford, 1st Baron Stafford, and had thirteen children. Her daughter Dorothy Stafford served Queen Elizabeth as Mistress of the Robes, and her son Thomas Stafford was executed for treason against Queen Mary.
- Reginald Pole (March 1500-17 November 1558), cardinal, papal legate in various regions, including England, and the last Catholic Archbishop of Canterbury.
- Geoffrey Pole (c. 1504–1558), Lord of the manor of Lordington in Sussex, suspected of treason by King Henry VIII and accused of conspiring with Charles V, Holy Roman Emperor. He lived in exile in Europe and married Constance Pakenham, granddaughter and heiress of Sir John Pakenham. John Pakenham was an ancestor to Sir Edward Pakenham, the brother-in-law to the Duke of Wellington. They had 11 children and Geoffrey's eldest son and heir, Arthur Pole, was a conspirator and aspirant to the crown, supported by two of his brothers. He attempted to persuade France and Spain to support his claim, as he was a Catholic and could claim a line of descent from King Edward III free from the "illegitimacy" of Elizabeth I. He was found guilty of treason and was imprisoned in the Beauchamp Tower where he died on 12 August 1570.

== Legacy ==
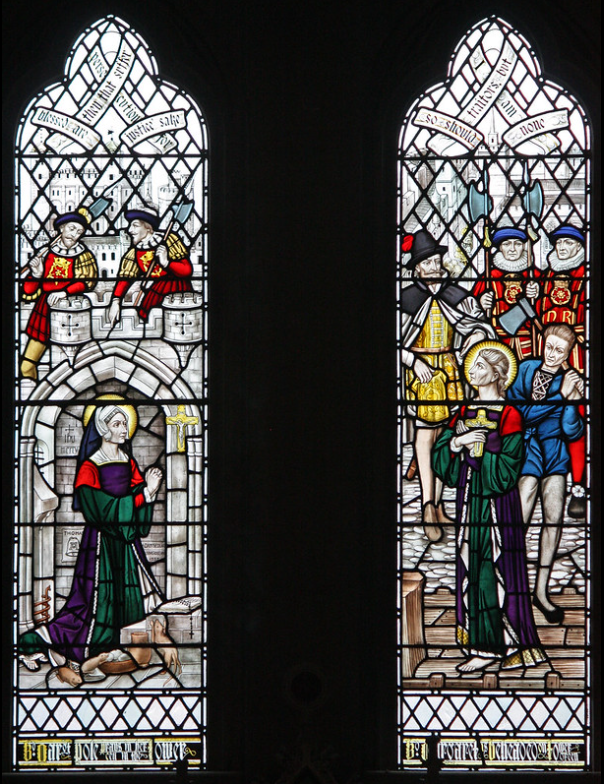
Stained glass windows of Gothic Revival Our Lady and the English Martyrs Church, Cambridge depicting Blessed Margaret Pole at prayer in her cell at the Tower of London and her beheading at Tower Green

Margaret's son Reginald Pole said, "I am now the son of a martyr whom the King of England has brought to the scaffold although she was seventy years old and his own near relation, for her perseverance in the Catholic faith." Margaret was later regarded by the Catholic Church as a martyr. She was beatified on 29 December 1886 by Pope Leo XIII, and is known in the General Roman Calendar as the Blessed Margaret Pole.

Panel paintings of Margaret are in a number of English churches, including:

- English Martyrs Church, Preston (she is on the right.)
- St Joseph's Church in Sale, Cheshire
- St. Marie's Church in New Bilton, Rugby, Warwickshire

There are stained glass windows of her in several English churches as well:

- Our Lady of Lourdes in Harpenden, Hertfordshire.
- St. Osmund's Church in Salisbury, Wiltshire
- St. Mary's Catholic Church in Bridge Gate, Derby, Derbyshire
- Our Lady and the English Martyrs' church in Cambridge, Cambridgeshire (and another one from the right)
- Shrewsbury Cathedral, Shrewsbury, Shropshire, she is in the fourth window in front of John Fisher.

She is commemorated in the dedication of the Church of Our Lady Queen of Peace & Blessed Margaret Pole in Southbourne, Bournemouth.

== Cultural depictions ==
- Margaret is depicted in William Shakespeare's 16th-century play Richard III as the young daughter of the murdered Duke of Clarence.
- The character of Lady Salisbury in the Showtime series The Tudors, played by Kate O'Toole in 2007 and 2009, is loosely based on Margaret Pole.
- Janet Henfrey portrays Margaret in Episode 4 ("The Devil's Spit") of Wolf Hall, the 2015 BBC adaptation of Hilary Mantel's novels Wolf Hall (2009) and Bring Up the Bodies (2012).
- Margaret is the main character of Samantha Wilcoxson's 2016 novel, Faithful Traitor.
- Margaret is the main character of Philippa Gregory's 2014 novel The King's Curse. She also appears in Gregory's novels The Kingmaker's Daughter (2012) and The White Princess (2013).
- Margaret was portrayed by Rebecca Benson in the television adaptation of The White Princess (2017) and by Laura Carmichael in the miniseries The Spanish Princess (2019), a sequel to The White Princess.
- Harriet Walter portrays Margaret in the Wolf Hall: The Mirror and the Light, the BBC's 2024 television adaptation of Hilary Mantel's novel, The Mirror and the Light (2020).

== Genealogical table ==
(selective chart)

Edward III	Philippa of Hainault
Edward of Woodstock	Edmund, Duke of York	John, Duke of Lancaster	Blanche of Lancaster
Richard II	Henry IV
Joan Beaufort	Ralph Neville
Henry V
Richard, Earl of Cambridge	Richard Neville of Salisbury
Richard, Duke of York	Cecily Neville	Richard Neville of Warwick	Henry VI
Edward IV	Richard III	George Plantagenet	Isabel Neville
Richard Pole	Margaret Pole	Edward Plantagenet
Henry Pole	Arthur Pole	Ursula Pole	Reginald Pole	Geoffrey Pole

== Sources ==
- Bernard, G. W. (2007). The king's reformation: Henry VIII and the remaking of the English church. New Haven, Conn.: Yale University Press. ISBN 9780300122718.
- Dwyer, J. G. "Pole, Margaret Plantagenet, Bl." at New Catholic Encyclopedia. 2nd ed. Vol. 11. Detroit: Gale, 2003. pp. 455–456. Cited as New Catholic Encyclopedia.
- Harrison, Helene (2024). Tudor Executions From Nobility to the Block. Barnsley, England: Pen and Sword. ISBN 9781399043366.
- Mayer, T. F. Pole, Reginald (1500–1558), Oxford Dictionary of National Biography, Oxford University Press, 2004; online edn., January 2008.
- Pierce, Hazel (1996), The Life, Career and Political Significance of Margaret Pole, Countess of Salisbury 1473–1541, Bangor University, archived from the original on 28 March 2020
- ——. "Pole, Margaret, suo jure Countess of Salisbury (1473–1541)". Oxford Dictionary of National Biography (online ed.). Oxford University Press. doi:10.1093/ref:odnb/22451. (Subscription, Wikipedia Library access or UK public library membership required.)
- —— (2003). Margaret Pole, Countess of Salisbury, 1473-1541: loyalty, lineage and leadership. Cardiff: University of Wales Press. ISBN 0-7083-1783-9.

Peerage of England
Vacant Title last held by Edward Plantagenet	Countess of Salisbury; 1513–1539	Forfeit
