= Arthur Pole (conspirator) =

English conspirator

Sir Arthur Pole of Lordington, Sussex (1531 – between January 1570 and 12 August 1570) was an English conspirator.

== Life ==
He was the eldest son and heir of Sir Geoffrey Pole and Constance Packenham who had some claim to the English throne as a Plantagenet descendant of George, Duke of Clarence. He was raised at Lordington, and Gentian Hervet of Orléans served as his tutor. After the fall of his uncle, Henry Pole, Baron Montagu and his grandmother, Margaret, Countess of Salisbury, Arthur was imprisoned for a time. Upon release (before 1552), he served John Dudley, Duke of Northumberland.

The Pole family was in favour during Mary's reign, and although Arthur requested to serve at the court of Elizabeth I, his request was denied in 1561. He was imprisoned that same year for celebrating the mass. In 1562, he was named a potential heir to the throne. Pole attempted to persuade France and Spain to back the family's claims. Advised that the Guise faction would not support his claim, Arthur sought the dukedom of Clarence in exchange for his support of Mary, Queen of Scots claim to the English throne. He was imprisoned with his brothers, Edmund and Geoffrey, in the Tower of London from October 1562 or 1563 for conspiring to advance his own or Mary, Queen of Scots' claims to the throne of England. On 26 February 1563 at the Tower of London, he was found guilty of treason, and imprisoned; he died in 1570. Arthur was imprisoned in the Beauchamp Tower, where an inscription can be found that reads: ‘Deo Servire / Penitentiam Inire / Fato Obedire / Regnare Est / A Poole / 1564 / IHS’ (‘To be subject to God, to enter upon penance, to be obedient to fate, is to reign, A Poole, 1564, Jesus’).

== Marriage ==
Between 15 September 1562 and 27 January 1563, he married Mary Holland, who died before 16 November 1570, daughter of Sir Richard Holland of Denton, Lancashire, and wife Eleanor Harbottle, who was the widow of Sir Thomas Percy (attainted and executed in 1537), son of Henry Algernon Percy, 5th Earl of Northumberland and Catherine Spencer. The couple had no children.
