= Arthur Poole =

Arthur Poole may refer to:

- Arthur Poole (footballer), footballer for Port Vale
- Arthur Poole (cricketer, born 1907) (1907–1979), English cricketer
- Arthur Poole (cricketer, born 1878) (1878–1955), New Zealand cricketer

== See also ==
- Arthur Pole (disambiguation)
