= William Pole (disambiguation) =

William Pole (1814–1900) was an English engineer, astronomer, musician and authority on whist.

William Pole may also refer to:

- Sir William Pole (antiquary) (1561–1635), historian of Devon
- William Pole (died 1587) (1515–1587), MP for Lyme Regis, father of William Pole (antiquary)
- Sir William Pole, 4th Baronet (1678–1741), English landowner and politician

== See also ==
- William de la Pole (disambiguation)
- William Pole-Carew, Cornish politician
- William Pole-Tylney-Long-Wellesley (disambiguation)
- William Pool, English inventor and whitesmith
