= Richard Pole =

Richard Pole may refer to:

- Sir Richard Pole (courtier) (1462–1505), Welsh supporter of King Henry VII and husband of Margaret Pole, Countess of Salisbury
- Richard de la Pole (died 1525), pretender to the English crown
- Sir Richard Carew Pole, 13th Baronet (1938−2024), holder of the baronetcy granted to his ancestor by King Charles I in 1628
- Dick Pole (born 1950), former Major League Baseball pitcher
