= Exeter Conspiracy =

Supposed plot against Henry VIII of England

The Exeter Conspiracy in 1538 was an attempt to overthrow Henry VIII, who had taken control of the Church of England away from the Pope, and replace him with Henry Courtenay, 1st Marquess of Exeter, who was a first cousin of the King.

== Conspiracy ==
An Act of Attainder was brought against the Marquess of Exeter and he was found guilty of treason by his peers in Westminster Hall, along with other supposed conspirators. Some sources suggest the conspiracy was largely exaggerated by Thomas Cromwell, at this point Vicegerent, Lord Privy Seal, Principal Secretary and Chancellor of the Exchequer, and Richard Rich, 1st Baron Rich, the protege of Thomas Audley. Victorian historian J. A. Froude, however, writes that the Courtenays were 'petty sovereigns in Devonshire and Cornwall', which may go some way to explaining the true nature of the conspiracy. Yet there is evidence to suggest that Courtenay had the means and intended to muster a rebellion against the King. The charges brought against him were based on the illegal correspondence he had with Reginald Pole, who was both a Catholic cardinal and a possible Yorkist claimant to the English throne, and the confession and testimony of Geoffrey Pole, Reginald's brother.

== Aftermath ==
The king, with Reginald Pole himself out of his reach, took revenge on Pole's family for engaging in treason by word against the king. The leading family members and even Pole's mother, Margaret Pole, Countess of Salisbury, were executed, and all their properties seized. The action destroyed the Pole family. Sir Geoffrey Pole was arrested in August 1538; he had been corresponding with Reginald, and the investigation of Henry Courtenay, Marquess of Exeter (Henry VIII's first cousin and Reginald Pole's second cousin) had turned up his name; he had appealed to Thomas Cromwell, who had him arrested and interrogated. Under interrogation, Sir Geoffrey said that Henry Pole, 1st Baron Montagu (his eldest brother), and Exeter had been parties to his correspondence with Reginald. Montagu, Exeter, Sir Edward Neville and Lady Salisbury were arrested in November 1538, together with Henry Pole and other family members, on charges of treason, although Cromwell had previously written that they had "little offended save that he Reginald Pole is of their kin". They were committed to the Tower of London.

=== Convictions ===
In November 1538, Sir Edward Neville was executed for treason. In January 1539, Sir Geoffrey was pardoned, and Montagu and Exeter were tried and executed for treason, while Reginald Pole was attainted in absentia. In May 1539, Montagu, Exeter, Lady Salisbury, and others were also attainted, as her father had been; this meant that they lost their lands – mostly in the South of England, conveniently located to assist any invasion – and titles, and those still alive in the Tower were also sentenced to death, so could be executed at the King's will. As part of the evidence given in support of the Bill of Attainder, Cromwell produced a tunic bearing the Five Wounds of Christ, symbolising Lady Salisbury's support of Roman Catholicism and the rule of Reginald and Mary; the supposed discovery, six months after her house and effects had been searched when she was arrested, is likely to be a fabrication.

In 1539, Sir Nicholas Carew, formerly something of a favourite of the king, fell out with him and was arrested and executed. At his trial it was alleged he had conspired for Exeter.

Margaret Pole, as the Countess of Salisbury was now called, was held in the Tower of London for two and a half years under severe conditions; she, her grandson (Montagu's son), and Exeter's son were held together and supported by the King. In 1540, Cromwell himself fell from favour and was himself executed and attainted for his support of Anne of Cleves. Margaret Pole was finally executed in 1541 (her execution was dreadfully botched and horrifying even for those brutal times), protesting her innocence until the last – a highly publicised case which was considered a grave miscarriage of justice both at the time and later. Reginald Pole is known to have said that he would "...never fear to call himself the son of a martyr". Some 350 years later, in 1886, Margaret was beatified by Pope Leo XIII.

== Theatrical depictions ==
- The events of the 'Exeter Conspiracy' were dramatised for the stage in a play called Our Father/Pater Noster (2009). It took place in May 2009 at St Nicholas' Priory in Exeter.
- The arrest and execution of the Pole family members were depicted in Season 3 of the television miniseries The Tudors.
- The events of the Exeter Conspiracy have been depicted in Series 2 of Wolf Hall.
