= Jane Lewkenor =

English noblewoman

Jane Lewkenor, Lady Pole of Trotton, Sussex (c. 1492–1562) was a member of the English nobility.

== Family ==
Jane Lewkenor was the daughter and co-heiress of Roger Lewkenor (b. 1469 and died January 15, 1543, in Trotton, Sussex) of Trotton, Sussex.

== Marriages ==
Lewkenor's first husband was Christopher Pickering of Ellerton (c. 1490 in Yorkshire and died September 7, 1516, in Woodbridge, Suffolk), whom she married before 1516.

Lewkenor's second husband was Arthur Pole, son of Margaret Pole, Countess of Salisbury, whom she married before 24 October 1522, most likely around 1526. The couple had at least four children: Henry (c.1525), Jane, Margaret (b. 1527 in Racton, England) who married Thomas Fitzherbert, and Mary (b. 1528 in Racton, England) who married John Stanley.

When Arthur died, his mother and brother, Lady Salisbury and her son, Lord Montague, did not wish Lewkenor to remarry, which would deprive the Pole family, and Arthur's heirs, of her fortune. They coerced Lewkenor to become a novice at Syon Abbey. Lewkenor was eventually released from her vows by William Barlow, the new Bishop of St. Asaph, who was residing in his priory of Bisham. She said to Barlow, "Can I leave the veil at pleasure?"; "Yes, for all religious persons have a time of probation. You are only a novice and could leave your nun's weeds at your pleasure. I bind you no further...", he said.

In 1539, Lewkenor married William Barentyne (b. 31 Dec. 1481 - d. 17 Nov. 1549), Sheriff of Oxfordshire and Berkshire. Their marriage was declared void by the consistory court of London on 15 December 1540 because of Lewkenor's vow of chastity. The Barentynes' sought and received an act of Parliament to declare their marriage valid and their children legitimate in 1544 after the passage of the Act of the Six Articles. Despite the passage of this act (34 & 35 Hen. 8. c. 46; 1543), the Barentyne's sons were still trying to secure their inheritance in 1563. With Barentyne, she had two sons: Drew and Charles Barentyne.

Lewkenor died on 12 March 1562/63.
