= William Pole-Tylney-Long-Wellesley =

William Pole-Tylney-Long-Wellesley may refer to:

- William Pole-Tylney-Long-Wellesley, 4th Earl of Mornington
- William Pole-Tylney-Long-Wellesley, 5th Earl of Mornington

== See also ==
- William Pole (disambiguation)
