= Thomas Lupset =

English priest and humanist scholar (d. 1530)

Thomas Lupset (c. 1495–1530) was an English churchman and humanist scholar.

== Life ==
He studied in London's St Paul's Cathedral School, and at a young age entered the household of John Colet. He learned classics from William Lilye, and then went to Pembroke Hall, Cambridge.

In Cambridge Lupset worked closely with Desiderius Erasmus, on New Testament and patristic texts. He may then have travelled to Italy with Richard Pace. From 1519 he was supported by Cardinal Wolsey at Corpus Christi College, Cambridge, as a reader in humanities, as successor to John Clement. He then was given church livings and lectured in Greek. He was tutor to Thomas Wynter, Wolsey's son.

== Works ==
A friend of Thomas More, Erasmus, Thomas Linacre, Budaeus, Reginald Pole, and John Leland, he did editorial work and saw books through the press for them. He was the supervisor of Linacre's editions of Galen's treatises, and of the second edition of More's Utopia. His own works, mainly letters, translation and moral treatises, were collected for publication in 1545.

A dialogue between Reginald Pole and Thomas Lupset is an imagined work of political theory by Thomas Starkey. It is set at Bisham Abbey, and may be based on an actual visit of Lupset to Pole there in 1529. It is in the tradition of Utopia, and of Thomas Elyot's almost contemporary The Boke named the Governour.
