= William de la Pole =

William de la Pole may refer to:

- Sir William de la Pole (of Mawddwy) (died bef. 1319)
- Sir William de la Pole of Hull (died 1366)
- William de la Pole, 1st Duke of Suffolk (died 1450)
- Sir William de la Pole (1478–1539), son of John de la Pole, 2nd Duke of Suffolk, incarcerated in the Tower of London for 37 years

== See also ==
- William Pole (disambiguation)
