= Edmund de la Pole =

Edmund de la Pole may refer to:

- Edmund de la Pole (Captain of Calais) (c. 1337–1419)
- Edmund de la Pole, 3rd Duke of Suffolk (1471/1472–1513)
