= Geoffrey Pole =

English knight

Sir Geoffrey Pole
- Born: c. 1501 or 1502
- Died: 1558
- Spouse: Constance Pakenham
- Children: Sir Arthur Pole of Lordington; Thomas Pole of Lordington and of West Stoke; Edmund Pole of Lordington and of West Stoke (?); Geoffrey Pole of Lordington and of West Stoke; Henry Pole; Catherine Pole; Catherine Pole; Elizabeth Pole; Mary Pole; Margaret Pole; Ann Pole
- Parent(s): Sir Richard Pole; Margaret Pole, 8th Countess of Salisbury

Sir Geoffrey Pole of Lordington, Sussex (c. 1501 or 1502 – November 1558) was an English knight who supported the Catholic Church in England and Wales when Henry VIII of England was establishing the alternative Church of England with himself as leader.

== Early life ==
He was fourth son of Sir Richard Pole (d. 1505), by his wife Margaret Pole, 8th Countess of Salisbury, and the younger brother of Henry Pole, 1st Baron Montagu and of Cardinal Reginald Pole. He was one of the knights made by Henry VIII at York Place in 1529. Soon afterwards, or before 9 July 1528, he married Constance Pakenham, the elder of the two daughters and co-heirs of Sir Edmund Pakenham, Gentleman Usher to Catherine of Aragon. Sir Edmund Pakenham died in 1528 and Geoffrey became possessed of the Manors of Eastcourt and Lordington at Racton in West Sussex, Sussex. From 1531, his name is met with in commissions of various kinds, including Justice of the Peace for both for Hampshire and for Sussex, and member of Parliament for Wilton beginning in 1529.

Like the rest of his family, he greatly disliked Henry VIII's proceedings for a divorce from Catherine of Aragon. In 1532, when the king went over to Calais with Anne Boleyn to meet Francis I of France, he crossed the sea in disguise, and keeping himself unseen in the apartments of his brother, Henry Pole, 1st Baron Montagu, who had gone over with the king, stole out at night to collect news. Montagu sent him back to England to inform Queen Catherine that Henry had not succeeded in persuading Francis to countenance his proposed marriage with Anne Boleyn.

Next year, however, his name appears set down, not with his own good will, among the knights appointed 'to be servitors' at Anne Boleyn's coronation on 1 June 1533. He was paid £40 for that service. A week after, on Thursday 5 June, he dined with Henry's daughter Mary. When Anne Boleyn was queen, he frequently visited the Spanish imperial ambassador, Eustace Chapuys, to assure him that the emperor would find the hearts of the English people with him if he invaded England to redress the wrong done to the former queen, Catherine of Aragon. He added that he himself wished to go to the emperor in Spain, which Chapuys wisely dissuaded him from doing. Geoffrey was also in the confidence of French ambassador and the bishop of London, John Stokesley. As T.F. Mayer puts it "In short, Geoffrey had a much higher profile in the opposition to Henry VIII's policies than his mother or his brother, Henry Pole, Lord Montagu."

== Pilgrimage of Grace and imprisonment ==
In 1536, on the suppression of the smaller monasteries, he purchased from the commissioners such goods as then remained of Dureford Abbey in Sussex, near Lordington. In the end of that year, he is said to have commanded a company, under the Duke of Norfolk, against the northern rebels at Doncaster; but his sympathies were really with the rebels, and he was determined beforehand not to act against them. Norfolk, however, was aware that the insurgents were too strong to be attacked, and Sir Geoffrey had no occasion to desert the royal standard. A letter of Lord De la Warr, perhaps misplaced in the 'Calendar' in October 1536, speaks of his causing a riot by a forcible entry into Slindon Park, which he was afterwards ordered in the king's name immediately to quit. In October 1537 he came to court, but the king refused to see him. A letter of his to the lord chancellor, dated at Lordington, 5 April, in which he hopes for a return of the king's favour, was probably written in 1538, though placed among the state papers of 1537. On 29 August 1538, he was arrested and sent to the Tower of London.

This was a blow aimed at his whole family, whom the king had long meant to crush on account of the opposition to his policies by his brother, Reginald, the cardinal. For nearly two months, Geoffrey lay in prison; on 26 October a set of interrogations was administered to him, first about words dropped by himself in private conversation, when he had discussed an English religious policy with his brother, Henry, and next about letters and messages he, his mother, or others of his family had received. Much of the evidence he gave was instrumental in condemning both his brother and mother to the scaffold, primarily because of their loyalty to Princess Mary and the Catholic church. On 4 December 1538, he pleaded guilty at his trial for treason and then attempted twice to commit suicide. He was pardoned on 4 January 1539, but the experience seems to have led to a mental breakdown.

== Exile ==
After his mother's execution, many of the Pole family lands were seized by the crown, but some were returned to Geoffrey in 1544. In 1548, he fled England and found his way to Rome, and threw himself at the feet of his brother, Cardinal Reginald Pole, saying he was unworthy to be called his brother for having caused another brother's death. Cardinal Pole brought him to the pope for absolution and afterwards sent him into Flanders to the bishop of Liege, allowing him an allowance of forty crowns a month. There he chiefly lived until the close of Edward VI's reign. His wife and family, however, were still at Lordington, and he had a strong desire to return to England. In 1550, he visited Sir John Mason at Poissy, while on a journey to Rouen. He explained that he was riding up and down that summer to see countries and begged Mason to procure leave for him to return to England. He continued to campaign to return home. In 1552, his son Arthur was released from prison and went to serve the Duke of Northumberland. Geoffrey wrote to the duke, asking for a safe conduct home. Despite these efforts, he was excepted from the general pardon granted at the end of the parliament in 1552. After Queen Mary's accession in 1553, he returned to England.

== Death and issue ==
He died in 1558, a few days before Reginald, and was buried at Stoughton Church. He was attended in his last illness by Father Peter de Soto. His widow Constance, who made her will on 1 or 2 August 1570 and died after 12 August 1570, desired to be buried beside him. He had five sons (the eldest son Arthur) and six daughters, two of whom were married, and one a nun of Syon Abbey. One of the married daughters was the mother of John Fortescue, whose daughter Elizabeth Fortescue (died aft. 16 April 1652) married Sir John Beaumont, 1st Baronet:

- Arthur Pole of Lordington, Sussex (1531 – bet. January 1570 and 12 August 1570).
- Thomas Pole of Lordington, Sussex, and of West Stoke, Sussex (between 1532 and 1540 – between 12 August 1570 and 2 November 1570), married to Mary, who died around March 1576, widow of John Lewes, who then married thirdly to Francis Cotton, without issue.
- Edmund Pole of Lordington, Sussex, and of West Stoke, Sussex (?) (1541 – after 12 August 1570), who was imprisoned with his brother Arthur before 12 August 1570 in the Tower of London, after conspiring with him to advance his own or Mary, Queen of Scots' claims to the throne of England, in the Tower of London from October 1562 or 1563; on 26 February 1563 at the Tower of London, his brother was found guilty of treason, and imprisoned there, where he died.
- Geoffrey Pole of Lordington, Sussex, and of West Stoke, Sussex (1546 – before 9 March 1590/1591), was educated at Winchester College, Winchester, Hampshire, imprisoned with his brothers in the Tower of London in 1570 but released, married before 1573 Catherine Dutton, and died after 1608, and had nine children, including the following:
  - Henry Pole (bef. 1570 – aft. 1570)
  - Arthur Pole of Lordington, Sussex, and of West Stoke, Sussex (c. 1575 – murdered, Rome, 23 June 1605), who was educated at the Palazzo Farnese, in Rome, Italy, along with the son of Alexander Farnese, Duke of Parma, and became Lord of the manor of Walderton, Sussex, and a Member of the Household of Cardinal Odoardo Farnese, unmarried and without issue; died in Rome.
  - Geoffrey Pole of Lordington, Sussex, and of West Stoke, Sussex (c. 1577 – assassinated, Rome, bef. 7 January 1619), who was educated at the seminaries, in Douai, France, and at the English College, in Rome, Italy, unmarried and without issue. Owned Wirehall in Cheshire, which was forfeited to the crown by his relative, James Pole, son of Richard Pole.
  - Jane
  - Catherine
  - Constance
  - Martha
  - Mary
- Henry Pole
- Catherine Pole, died young.
- Catherine Pole, who married Sir Anthony Fortescue.
- Elizabeth Pole, who married William Neville.
- Mary Pole, who married William Cowfeld.
- Margaret Pole, who married Walter Windsor.
- Ann Pole, who married Thomas Hildersham and had at least one son, Arthur, born 6 October 1553 at Stetchworth. After Hildersham's death, Anne remarried a man named Ward.

== Ancestors ==
Ancestors of Geoffrey Pole

16.
8.
17.
4. Sir Geoffrey Pole of Worrell and Wythurn
18.
9.
19.
2. Sir Richard Pole
20. John St John
10. Sir Oliver St John of Bletso
21. Elizabeth Paullet
5. Edith St John
22. John Beauchamp of Bletso
11. Margaret Beauchamp of Bletso
23. Edith Stourton
1. Sir Geoffrey Pole
24. Richard of Conisburgh, 3rd Earl of Cambridge
12. Richard Plantagenet, 3rd Duke of York
25. Anne de Mortimer
6. George Plantagenet, 1st Duke of Clarence
26. Ralph de Neville, 1st Earl of Westmorland
13. Cecily Neville
27. Joan Beaufort, Countess of Westmorland
3. Margaret Pole, 8th Countess of Salisbury
28. Richard Neville, 5th Earl of Salisbury
14. Richard Neville, 16th Earl of Warwick
29. Alice Neville, 5th Countess of Salisbury
7. Isabella Neville
30. Richard de Beauchamp, 13th Earl of Warwick
15. Anne Neville, 16th Countess of Warwick
31. Isabel le Despenser, Countess of Worcester and Warwick
