= Arthur Poole (cricketer, born 1907) =

English cricketer

Personal information
- Full name: Arthur Bertram Poole
- Born: 30 June 1907; Bedford, Bedfordshire, England
- Died: 22 November 1979 (aged 72); Hammersmith, London, England
- Batting: Right-handed

Domestic team information
- Years: Team
- 1936: Minor Counties
- 1925–1951: Bedfordshire

Career statistics
Competition	First-class
Matches	1
Runs scored	92
Batting average	92.00
100s/50s	–/1
Top score	91*
Balls bowled	–
Wickets	–
Bowling average	–
5 wickets in innings	–
10 wickets in match	–
Best bowling	–
Catches/stumpings	–/–
- Source: Cricinfo, 5 May 2012

Arthur Bertram Poole (30 June 1907 – 22 November 1979) was an English cricketer. Poole was a right-handed batsman. He was born at Bedford, Bedfordshire, and was educated at Bedford Modern School.

Poole made his debut in county cricket for Bedfordshire in the 1925 Minor Counties Championship against Oxfordshire. Prior to the start of World War II in 1939, Poole had appeared for Bedfordshire in 79 Minor Counties Championship matches. In 1936, Poole was selected to play for a combined Minor Counties team in a first-class match against Oxford University at the University Parks. Batting first, the Minor Counties made 251 all out, with Poole being dismissed for a single run by Bill Murray-Wood. In response, Oxford University made 288 all out in their first-innings. In their second-innings, the Minor Counties made 294 all out, with Poole top-scoring with 91 not out. Oxford University reached 23 without loss in their second-innings, with the match declared a draw. Following World War II, he resumed his Minor counties career with Bedfordshire, making a further 37 appearances from 1946 to 1951, the last of which came against Buckinghamshire. He was the county captain during this period.

He later became the president of Bedfordshire County Cricket Club, a position he held until his death on 22 November 1979, at Hammersmith, London.
