= Michael de la Pole =

Michael de la Pole may refer to:

- Michael de la Pole, 1st Earl of Suffolk (1330–1389)
- Michael de la Pole, 2nd Earl of Suffolk (1367–1415)
- Michael de la Pole, 3rd Earl of Suffolk (1394–1415)
