= John de la Pole =

John de la Pole may refer to:

- John de la Pole (died c.1397), MP for Derbyshire (UK Parliament constituency) in 1377 and 1394
- John de la Pole (born c.1385), MP for Derbyshire (UK Parliament constituency) in 1416, 1417 and 1426
- John de la Pole, 2nd Duke of Suffolk, 2nd Marquess of Suffolk, 5th Earl of Suffolk, (1442–1491/1492)
- John de la Pole, 1st Earl of Lincoln (1462/1464–1487), son of the above
- Sir John de la Pole, 6th Baronet (1757–1799), Member of Parliament
