= The Tower of London (novel) =

Book by William Harrison Ainsworth

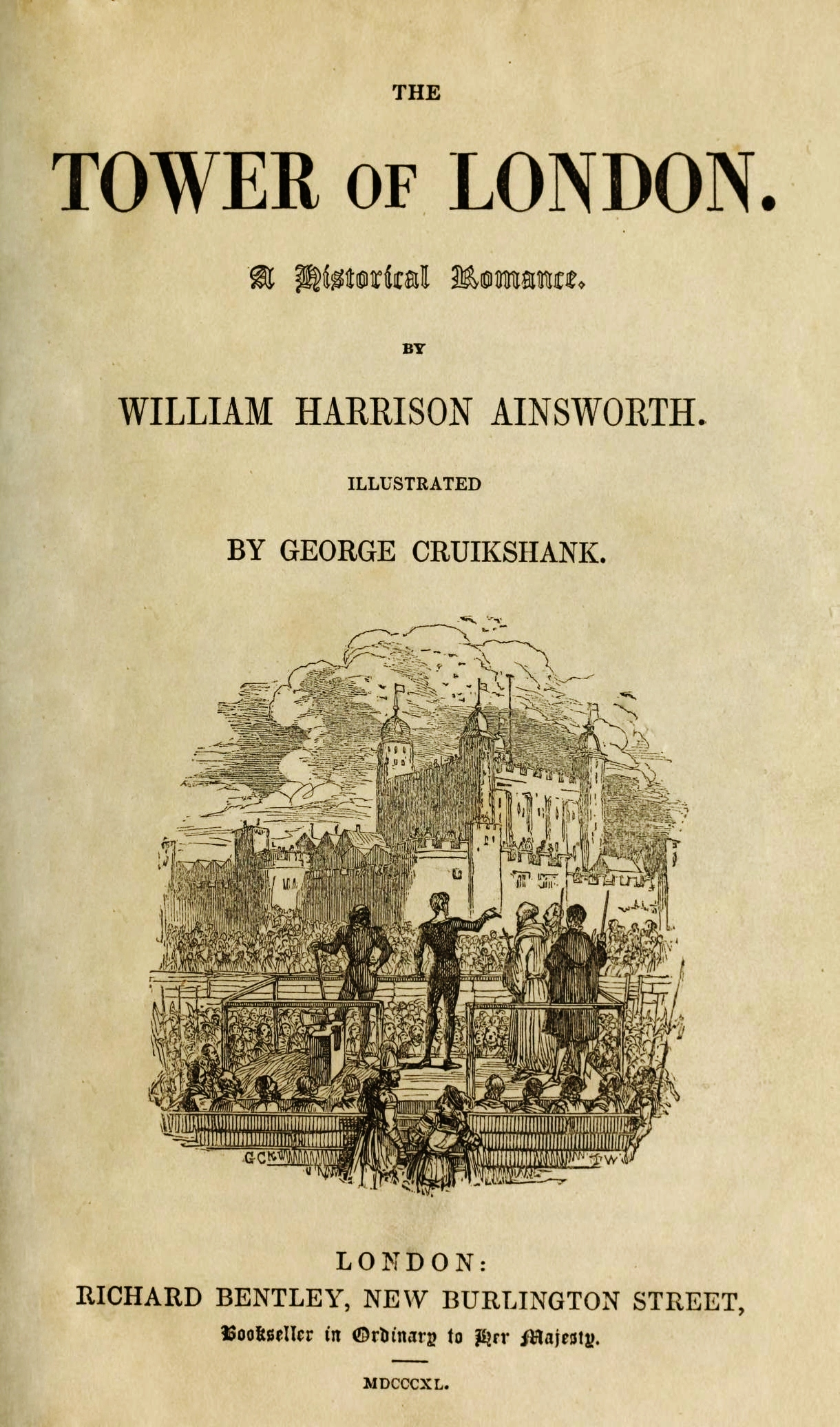
- First edition title page
- Author: W. H. Ainsworth
- Illustrator: George Cruikshank
- Publication date: 1840

The Tower of London is a novel by William Harrison Ainsworth serially published in 1840. It is a historical romance that describes the history of Lady Jane Grey from her short-lived time as Queen of England to her execution.

== Background ==
During 1840, Ainsworth was busy writing the serial The Tower of London while writing a serial for Guy Fawkes and while planning to start his own magazine. Both novels began their publication in January 1840, with The Tower of London being published on its own until December 1840. Ainsworth celebrated the conclusions of The Tower of London with a large dinner party near the printers of his works, Bradbury and Evans, at the Sussex Hotel. The work was illustrated by George Cruikshank.

== Story ==
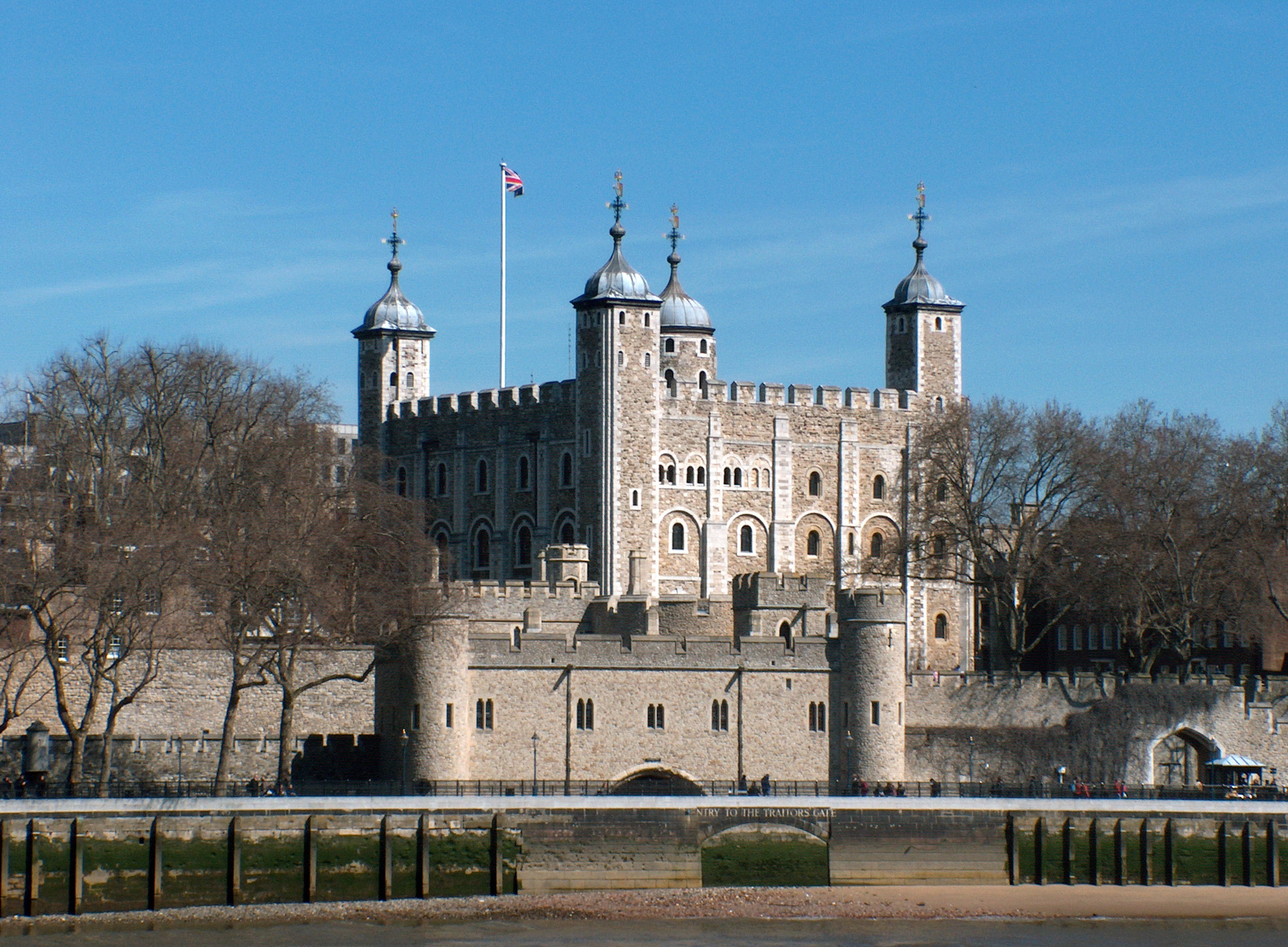
The Tower of London seen from the River Thames

The plot begins with Lady Jane Grey, wife of Lord Guilford Dudley and daughter-in-law to John Dudley, 1st Duke of Northumberland , as she enters the Tower of London on 10 July 1553. Prior to her entrance into the Tower, she ruled as Queen of England for nine days after she and her husband were put on the throne by the Duke of Northumberland. Soon after, Mary I of England took control of England and sent the Duke to be executed. Dudley, to gain back the kingdom, formed a rebellion, which resulted in failure and the imprisonment of both himself and his wife. After the imprisonment, Simon Renard, the Spanish Ambassador to England, arranges a marriage between Mary and Philip II of Spain to bring a Catholic take over of England.

The events of the book alternate between the historical background and the plot of Lady Jane. In Book II, incidents throughout the history of England from William the Conqueror to the 1820 Cato Street Conspiracy are mentioned. The novel returns to Lady Jane busying herself with prayer as she awaits her execution. Her only hope for freedom is to become a Catholic. There are conspiracies over Mary's rule of England, which come from those who supported the imprisoned Lady Jane and also those who wish to put Elizabeth I, the Protestant daughter of Henry VIII, on the throne. However, neither of these two sides succeeds before the novel ends, and Lady Jane is executed.

=== Characters ===
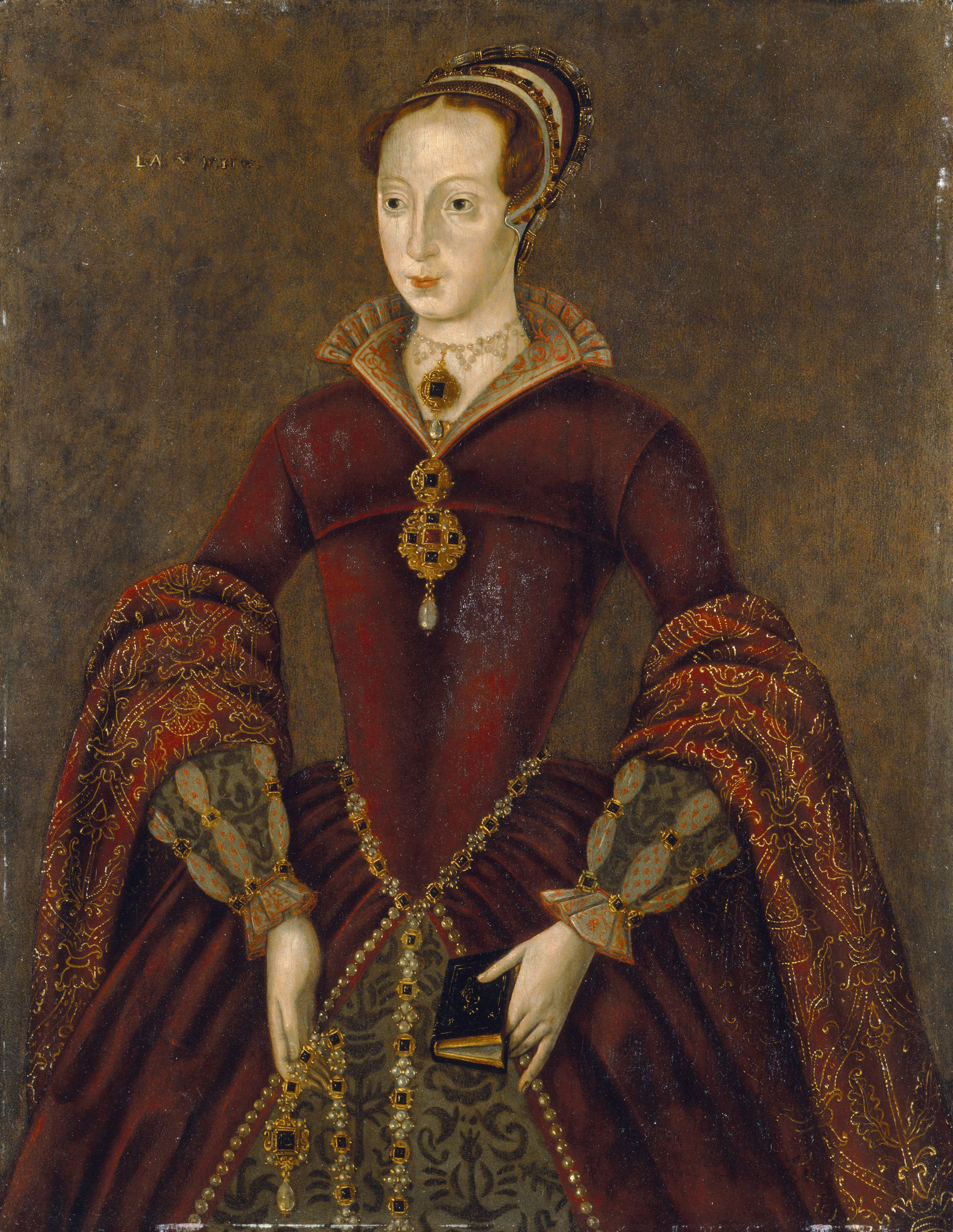
A painting of Lady Jane Grey, possibly from the late 16th century and based on an earlier portrait

- Lady Jane Grey
- Lord Guildford Dudley
- John Dudley, 1st Duke of Northumberland
- Mary I of England
- Philip II of Spain
- Xit (Sir Narcissus Le Grand)
- Og, Gog and Magog
- Winwike
- Cuthbert Cholmondeley
- Mistress Cicely
- Lawrence Nightgall
- Elizabeth
- Gunnora Boase
- Gilbert Pot
- Simon Renard
- Mauger, the headsman
- Mistress Placida Paston
- The Duke of Suffolk
- Master Hairun
- Peter Trusbut
- Dame Poentia Trusbut

=== Illustrations ===
The novel is illustrated with 40 engravings and 58 woodcuts by Cruikshank. The illustrations depict moments from the story while the woodcuts show off architectural features related to the Tower. Ainsworth was grateful for the illustrations to the novel, and he wrote in the preface that "it was no slight satisfaction to him, that circumstances at length enabled him to carry into effect his favourite project, in conjunction with the inimitable artist whose designs accompany the work."

== Themes ==
The novel begins with a preface which explains: "It has been, for years, the cherished wish of the writer of the following pages, to make the Tower of London – the proudest monument of antiquity, considered with reference to its historical associates, which this country, or any other possess – the groundwork of a romance". He continues by describing his idea for the Tower itself, "Desirous of exhibiting the Tower in its triple light of a palace, a prison, and a fortress, the Author has shaped his story with reference to that end; and he has also endeavoured to contrive such a series of incidents as should naturally introduce every reflect of the old pile – its towers, chapels, halls, chambers, gateways, arches, and draw-bridges – so that no part of it should remain unillustrated."

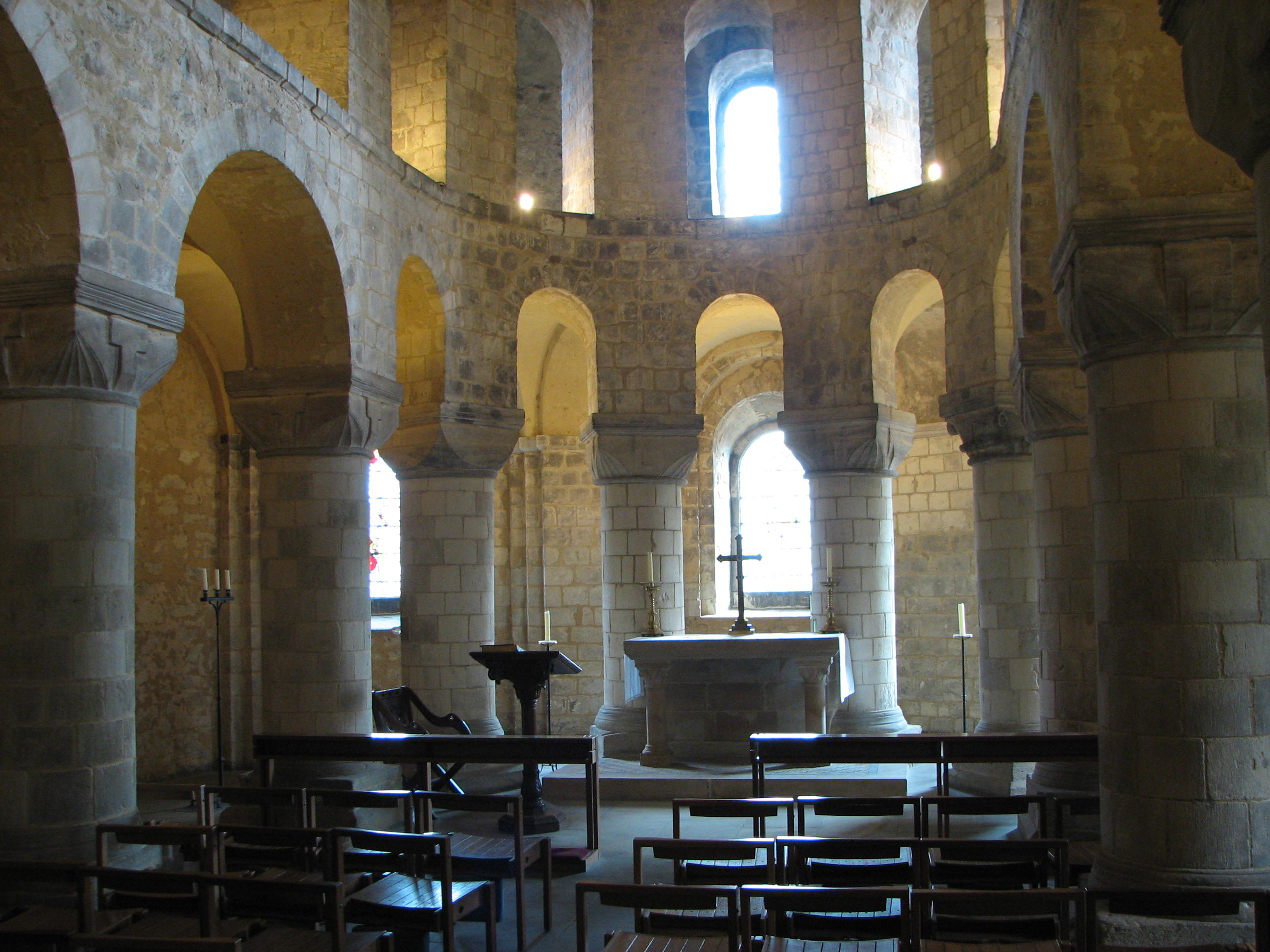
St John's Chapel in the Tower, which Lady Jane visited on her first night in the castle

The focus in the novel is the three aspects of the Tower of London. To further this focus, Ainsworth depicts two crownings, a wedding, executions, and even a siege of the Tower. Lady Jane has her first night at the Tower as the Queen of England, and she visits St John's Chapel, located in the White Tower. Later, she is kept as the Tower's prisoner. Overall, the Tower has gothic elements along with having a connection to the Catholic Church in its architecture. The Tower, in its style, also represented the sublime and the connection with the divine. With these various dimensions to the Tower, there is a connection between The Tower of London and Victor Hugo's Notre Dame de Paris, in their emphasis on architecture and with history.

The architectural descriptions within the novel tend to break up some of the aspects of the plot, but they serve to show how the Tower has changed over time. This transcends the temporal bounds of the plot to connect the origins of the Tower to the 19th century when Ainsworth published the novel. According to literary critic George Worth, "Ainsworth seems constantly to be trying to remind his readers, living in an age of urbanization and industrialization in which historic old landmarks were being swept away or defaced or 'restored' beyond recognition, that they had a heritage, one very large vested in physical structures of one kind or another, and that the heritage [...] might soon be gone beyond recall."

Catholics, in general, were viewed negatively by Ainsworth's contemporary English audience. In particular, Mary had the reputation for seeking the death of people and was dubbed "Bloody Mary". Although Ainsworth disagreed with the Catholic religion, he felt that they were part of an idealised English past, and he sought to describe them neutrally. Of Mary herself, Ainsworth emphasised aspects that made her a decent queen. Although many Catholics in the novel tried to use Mary to push Catholicism in a fanatical manner, Ainsworth introduces Cardinal Pole as a moderating figure who tries to sway Mary away from such views.

== Sources ==
The Tower of London is based on the events following the death of Edward VI. Various groups tried to seize the throne, and Mary I was crowned. This brought about a restoration of Catholicism and the rebellion of Thomas Wyatt. In depicting Mary, Ainsworth tried to overcome the view of her as "Bloody Mary" and any anti-Catholic bigotry. He felt that he could depict her without any bias as he focused on what was known about her knowledge and religious aspects. Ainsworth was accused of sensationalising violence in his novels; for instance critic Richard Church remarked that Ainsworth "brought sensationalism and an atmosphere of the Chamber of Horrors into the historical novel". Despite these assertions, Ainsworth was faithful to the sources he worked from. Most of his information was derived from David Jardine's A Reading on the Use of Torture in the Criminal Law of England (1837), and details such as the use of the Scavenger's Daughter are based on Jardine's description of torture in the Tudor period. By recounting suffering and torture in The Tower of London, Ainsworth made plain the consequences of failed political intrigue in the Tudor period. Jardine notes that members of the nobility were not tortured; Ainsworth overlooks this with the intention of showing that failure in political machinations came at a high price. In this, Ligocki feels that Ainsworth was true to the nature of the Tudor period, reflecting the "cruelty and ruthlessness of the politically ambitious of the age".

== Critical response ==
Edgar Allan Poe believes that "The authorship of this work does a little, and but a little, more credit to Mr. Ainsworth than that of 'Jack Sheppard'. It is in no spirit cavilling that we say it is rarely our lot to review a work more utterly destitute of every ingredient requisite to a good romance".

In 1934, Malcolm Elwin argues, "several of his novels – particularly Tower of London and Old St. Paul's, in spite of the absurd antics of the hero of the latter – have undoubtedly the quality of durability. No writer could hope to surpass either as romantic histories of their particular subject." Leo Mason, in a 1939 article, says that "History through the eyes of romance is the essence of Ainsworth at his best – The Lancashire Witches, Tower of London, Old St. Paul's, are romantic histories and will no doubt endure." Worth, in 1972, explains that Ainsworth "spaces his [architectural] descriptions judiciously throughout the novel in such a way as to heighten the effect of the novel rather than detract from it." In 1975, Nicholas Rance claims that The Tower of London is an "incongruous merging of historical romance and guide book".

The enduring image of the Tower of London as a grim place of torture and imprisonment was largely shaped by the works of 19th-century authors, particularly Ainsworth's novel. Such was its influence in emphasising the Tudor epoch of the Tower's history, in the late 20th century historians R Allen Brown and P Curnow felt it still dominated the public perception of the castle. In their official handbook to the Tower, published in 1986, they noted that "Still an innocent visitor to the place today might be led to suppose by guides and guidebooks, that it was built almost entirely for the Tudor monarchs".

== References in popular culture ==
The book is mentioned in the Victorian children's novel Little Lord Fauntleroy.
