= Lordington House =

Manor house in West Sussex, England

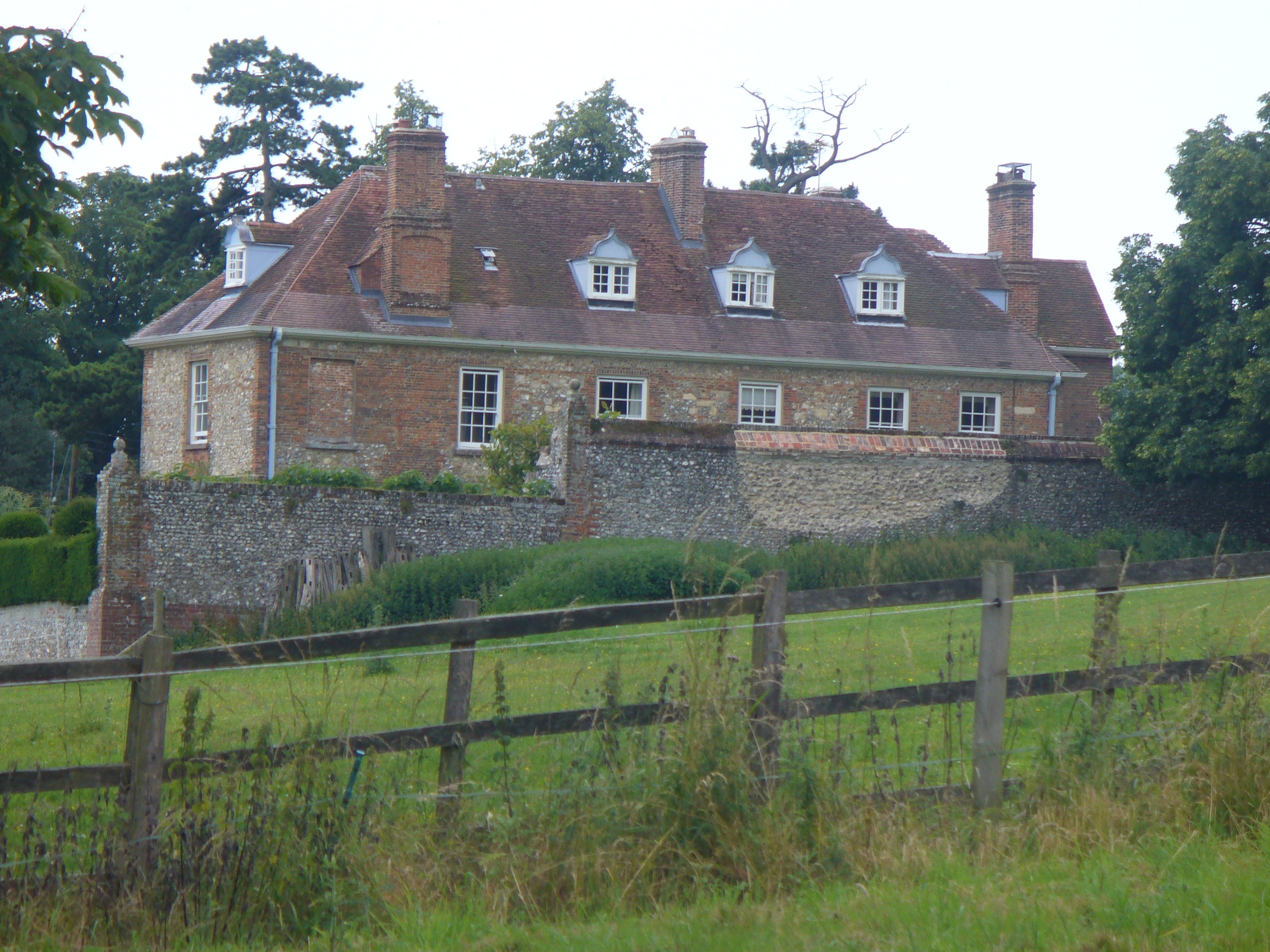
- Lordington House in 2011

- Location within West Sussex

General information
- Location: Near Walderton, West Sussex, England
- Coordinates: 50.88274°N 0.89020°W
- Years built: c. 1500 (foundations); 1623 (house)
- Renovated: 18th century (reroofed and window openings); 1845 (kitchen wing); 1895 (remodelled)

Listed Building – Grade II*
- Official name: Lordington House
- Designated: 5 June 1958
- Reference no.: 1034423

Lordington House is a manor house near Walderton in West Sussex, England. It is a Grade II* listed building.

== History ==
Lordington House was built around 1500. (Note: Historic England states: "The remaining part of a house of 1623, possibly built on the foundations of an earlier house of c1500 which belonged to the De La Pole family and in which Cardinal De La Pole was born".) It was acquired by Sir Geoffrey Pole in the 16th century, by Hugh Speke in 1609 and then by Sir John Fenner in 1623. It was then bought by Phillip Jermyn in 1630, by Richard Peckham in around 1689 and by Richard Peckham (Peckham's great nephew) in 1718. After Peckham's death in 1734 it passed to his sister, Sarah, who married Thomas Phipps in 1742. It passed to her son Thomas Peckham Phipps, who died unmarried, and then to the Phipps Hornby family. The house was modified and extended by Admiral of the Fleet Sir Geoffrey Hornby who died there in March 1895. It was sold to Sir Michael Hamilton in 1960.

== See also ==
- Grade II* listed buildings in West Sussex
