= Walderton =

Village in West Sussex, England

Coordinates: 50.89031°N 0.87714°W

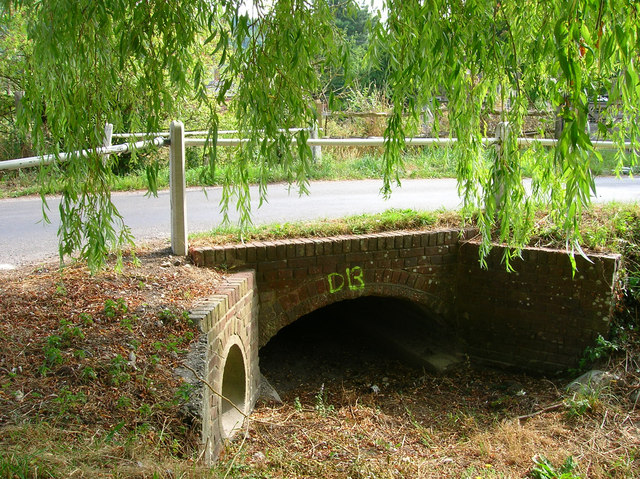
- River Ems, Walderton

- Location within West Sussex
- OS grid reference: SU790106
- Civil parish: Stoughton
- District: Chichester
- Shire county: West Sussex
- Region: South East
- Country: England
- Sovereign state: United Kingdom
- Post town: Chichester
- Postcode district: PO18
- Police: Sussex
- Fire: West Sussex
- Ambulance: South East Coast
- UK Parliament: Chichester

Walderton is a hamlet in the Chichester district of West Sussex, England. It lies on the B2146 road 4 miles (6.4 km) northeast of Emsworth. It is in the civil parish of Stoughton. The name Walderton derives from the town of Wealdhere's people.

The village lies just below the source of the River Ems. It is crossed by the Monarch's Way long-distance footpath, and has a pub named the Barley Mow.
