= Henry Pole, 1st Baron Montagu =

English nobleman

- Born: c. 1492
- Died: 9 January 1539
- Spouse: Jane Neville
- Children: Catherine Pole; Lucy Pole; Thomas Pole; Henry Pole; Winifred Pole
- Parent(s): Sir Richard Pole; Margaret Pole, 8th Countess of Salisbury

Henry Pole, 1st Baron Montagu (also written Montague or Montacute; circa 1492 – January 1539), was an English nobleman, the only holder of the title Baron Montagu under its 1514 creation, and one of the relatives whom King Henry VIII of England had executed for treason.

== Family ==
Henry Pole was the eldest son of Sir Richard Pole and Lady Margaret Plantagenet, daughter of George Plantagenet, 1st Duke of Clarence and his wife Isabel Neville. As his maternal grandfather, the 1st Duke of Clarence was a brother of the York kings Edward IV and Richard III. Henry's maternal grandmother, Isabel, was daughter to one of the most powerful men of his time, Richard Neville, 16th Earl of Warwick ("the Kingmaker"). Warwick was cousin to the York brothers by his paternal aunt, Cecily Neville, Duchess of York. The 16th Earl and Countess of Warwick were both descendants of King Edward III.

== Life ==
He was invested as a knight by King Henry VIII in 1513 and summoned to Parliament as Baron Montagu in the Peerage of England on 12 October 1514. He was appointed steward of manors belonging to the Tewkesbury Abbey in 1526. From 1530 on he became justice of the peace for Somerset, Dorset, Hampshire and Sussex. In May 1536, Henry was one of the peers in the trial of Anne Boleyn.

== Imprisonment and execution ==
On 4 November 1538, Montagu along with his wife's uncle, Edward Neville, and other relatives, were arrested on a charge of treason by Henry VIII as part of the Exeter Conspiracy, although Thomas Cromwell had previously written that they had "little offended save that he is of their kin". Montagu's brother Reginald was in exile at the time due to his opposition of Henry's divorce from Catherine of Aragon. They were committed to the Tower of London and Lord Montagu was attainted and his honours forfeited on 2 December 1538. Neville was beheaded on 8 December 1538, and another cousin, Henry Courtenay, 1st Marquess of Exeter, was executed on 9 December 1538. On 9 January 1539, all of the remaining arrestees were beheaded, with the exception of Henry's brother Geoffrey Pole.

Ten days after Montagu's arrest, his mother was arrested and questioned by William Fitzwilliam, and Thomas Goodrich, Bishop of Ely. They reported to Thomas Cromwell that although they had "travailed with her" for many hours she would "nothing utter," and they were forced to conclude that either her sons had not included her in their plans for "treason" or she was "the most arrant traitress that ever lived". On 27 May 1541, the 67-year-old Lady Salisbury was beheaded in the Tower of London. Lord Montagu's son Henry was committed to the Tower at the same time as his father. It was expected that he would follow his grandmother to the block, but the king did not want to risk unfavourable public opinion and so he was deprived of a tutor and imprisoned in the Tower until his death, possibly from starvation, in 1542 or later.

== Marriage and issue ==
In May 1510 or before May 1520, Pole married Jane Neville, daughter of George Nevill, 5th Baron Bergavenny, and Joan FitzAlan. They had the following children:

- Catherine Pole (b. aft. 1511 or in 1519 - 23 September 1576) married Francis Hastings, 2nd Earl of Huntingdon. They had eleven children.
- Thomas Pole (b. aft. 1519 or in 1520), married Elizabeth Wingfield. Without issue.
- Henry Pole (b. aft. 1520 or in 1521 – aft. September 1542), married Margaret Neville. According to Alison Weir he was born in 1527. He was imprisoned from an early age at the Tower of London until his death.
- Winifred Pole (b. aft. 1521 or in 1525), married
  firstly Sir Thomas Hastings (1515–1558), son of George Hastings, 1st Earl of Huntingdon and brother of her sister Catherine's husband. The marriage was without issue; he is buried at Stoke Poges, Buckinghamshire,
  secondly Sir Thomas Barrington of Barrington Hall, Hatfield Broadoak, Essex (died 1586). By the second Sir Thomas, Winifred had the following children: Sir Francis Barrington, 1st Baronet, John Barrington, and Catherine Barrington. Catherine married William Bourchier in 1584. He was a great-grandson of John Bourchier, 2nd Baron Berners. A son of Catherine and William was Sir John Bourchier, a regicide of King Charles I of England, who was the Great-great-nephew of King Henry VIII.
