= Reginald Pole =

Archbishop of Canterbury from 1556 to 1558

His Eminence Reginald Pole
- Cardinal Archbishop of Canterbury and Primate of All England
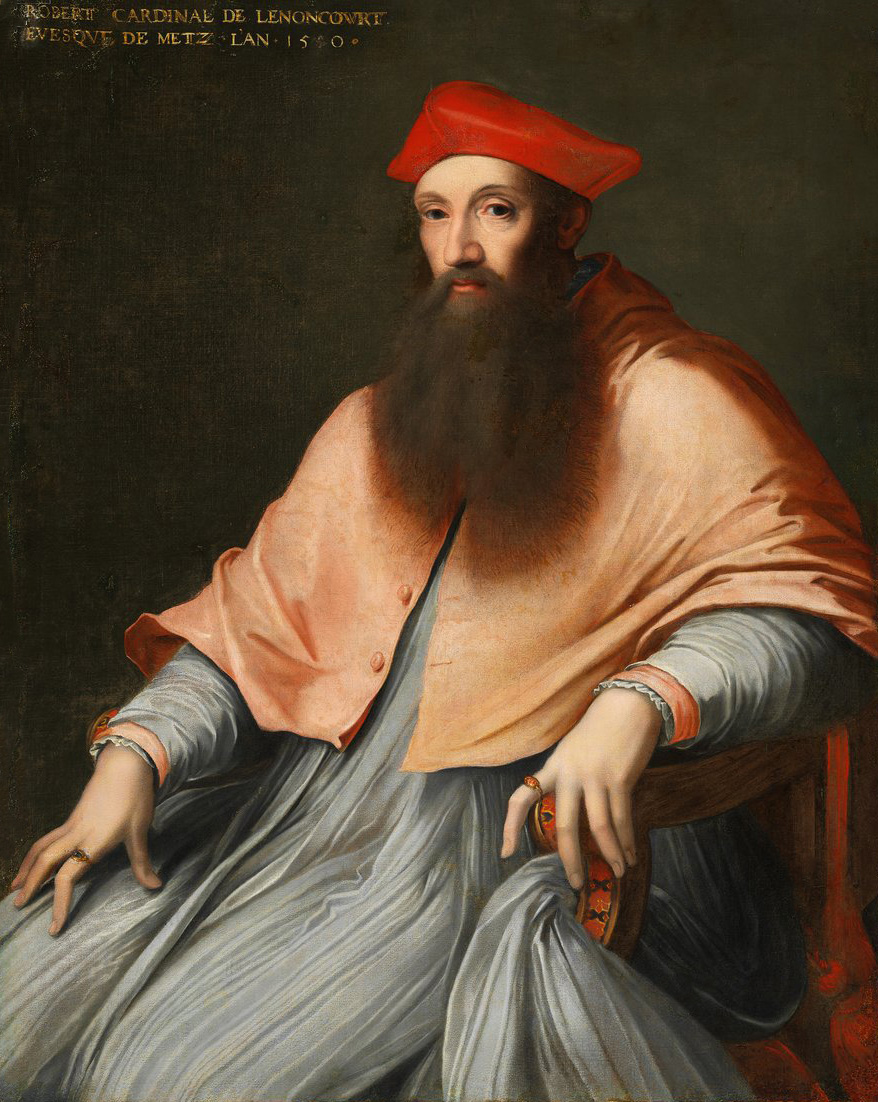
- Portrait by the school of Sebastiano del Piombo, c. 1549
- Church: Catholic Church
- Installed: 22 March 1556
- Term ended: 17 November 1558
- Predecessor: Thomas Cranmer
- Successor: Matthew Parker

Orders
- Ordination: 20 March 1556
- Consecration: 22 March 1556 by Nicholas Heath
- Created cardinal: 22 December 1536 by Paul III

Personal details
- Born: 12 March 1500 Stourton Castle, Staffordshire, England
- Died: 17 November 1558 (aged 58) London, England
- Buried: The Corona, Canterbury Cathedral, Kent; 51.27995°N 1.08248°E
- Parents: Sir Richard Pole; Margaret Pole, Countess of Salisbury
- Education: Magdalen College, Oxford; University of Padua
- Signature: Reginald Pole's signature

- Coat of arms: Reginald Pole's coat of arms

Reginald Pole (12 March 1500 – 17 November 1558) was an English cardinal and the last Catholic Archbishop of Canterbury, holding the office from 1556 to 1558 during the Marian Restoration of Catholicism.

== Early life ==
Pole was born at Stourton Castle, Staffordshire, on 12 March 1500, the third son of Sir Richard Pole and Margaret Pole, 8th Countess of Salisbury. He was named after the now beatified Reginald of Orleans, O.P. His maternal grandparents were George Plantagenet, 1st Duke of Clarence, and Isabel Neville, Duchess of Clarence; thus he was a great-nephew of kings Edward IV and Richard III and a great-grandson of Richard Neville, 16th Earl of Warwick.

Accounts vary as to where Pole received his early education: either Sheen Priory, Christchurch or Canterbury. Shortly thereafter, he matriculated at Magdalen College, Oxford, in 1512. At Oxford he was taught by William Latimer, his principal tutor, and Thomas Linacre, who taught him at some point between 1518 and 1520. In 1512, Henry VIII, who was his second cousin, had paid him a pension of £12, renewed the following year; intended to go towards his education. Pole graduated with a BA degree on 27 June 1515. In February 1518, King Henry granted him the deanery of Wimborne Minster, Dorset. He went on to be Prebendary of Salisbury, and Dean of Exeter in 1527. On 19 March 1518 he was appointed prebend of Ruscombe Southbury, Salisbury, only to exchange that on 10 April 1519 for "Yetminster secunda". He was also a canon in York, and had several other livings, albeit not yet ordained a priest. Assisted by Bishop Edward Foxe, he represented Henry VIII in Paris in 1529, probing general opinion among theologians of the Sorbonne on the annulment of Henry's marriage with Catherine of Aragon.

In 1521, with a £100 stipend from King Henry VIII, Pole went to the University of Padua. It was here that he met leading Renaissance figures, including Pietro Bembo, Gianmatteo Giberti (formerly Pope Leo X's datary and chief minister), Jacopo Sadoleto, Gianpietro Carafa (the future Pope Paul IV), Rodolfo Pio, Otto Truchsess, Stanislaus Hosius, Cristoforo Madruzzo, Giovanni Morone, Pier Paolo Vergerio the younger, Peter Martyr Vermigli and Vettor Soranzo. The last three were eventually to be condemned as heretics by the Catholic Church. As a widely known Protestant theologian, Vermigli contributed significantly to the Reformation in Pole's native England.

Pole's studies in Padua were partly financed by his election as a fellow of Corpus Christi College, Oxford. More than half of the cost was met by Henry VIII himself, on 14 February 1523. This allowed him to study abroad for three years.

While in Padua, Reginald's brother, Henry Pole, 1st Baron Montagu, presented to him the living of South Harting, Sussex on 10 April 1526. Three months later, Pole returned home, arriving from France escorted by Thomas Lupset. He was appointed prebend of Knaresborough in York Minster on 22 April 1527. On 25 July 1527, Pole was presented a canonry in Exeter Cathedral, to be declared Dean just four days later. Pole was sent to Paris in October 1529, but returned home in the summer of 1530. For some of his time in England he lived in John Colet's former house at Sheen.

== Pole and Henry VIII ==
Pole had most probably arrived back in England in 1527, but whatever political influence he had acquired was not documented until November 1528. The following October, he was sent to Paris with the purpose of getting an agreeable opinion on the annulment of Henry VIII's marriage from the university doctors. It is possible that Pole started learning Hebrew from Robert Wakefield after he returned home from France, which would suggest that Henry might have wanted to deploy Pole in the annulment project. Henry offered him the Archbishopric of York or the Diocese of Winchester if he would support the annulment of his marriage to Catherine of Aragon. It is likely that in May or June 1531 Pole furnished Henry with an analysis of the political difficulties with regard to a divorce, particularly the dangers this would bring to the succession. Pole withheld his support and went into self-imposed exile in France and Italy in 1532, where he continued his studies in Padua and Paris. After his return, he held the benefice of vicar of Piddletown, Dorset, between 20 December 1532 and sometime around January 1536.

In May 1536, Reginald Pole finally and decisively broke with the King. Five years earlier, he had warned of the dangers of the Boleyn marriage; he had returned to Padua in 1532 and received a last English benefice that December. Eustace Chapuys, the imperial ambassador to England, had suggested to Emperor Charles V that Pole marry Henry's daughter Mary and combine their dynastic claims; Chapuys also communicated with Reginald through his brother Geoffrey. At this time Pole was not definitively in Holy Orders.

The final break between Pole and Henry followed upon Thomas Cromwell, Cuthbert Tunstall, Thomas Starkey and others addressing questions to Pole on behalf of Henry. He answered by sending the King a copy of his published treatise Pro ecclesiasticae unitatis defensione, which, besides being a theological reply to the questions, was a strong denunciation of the King's policies, refuting Henry's position on marrying his brother Arthur's widow and denying the royal supremacy. Pole also urged the princes of Europe to depose Henry immediately. Henry wrote to Pole's mother, the Countess of Salisbury, who in turn sent her son a letter reproving him for his "folly".

== Cardinal Pole ==
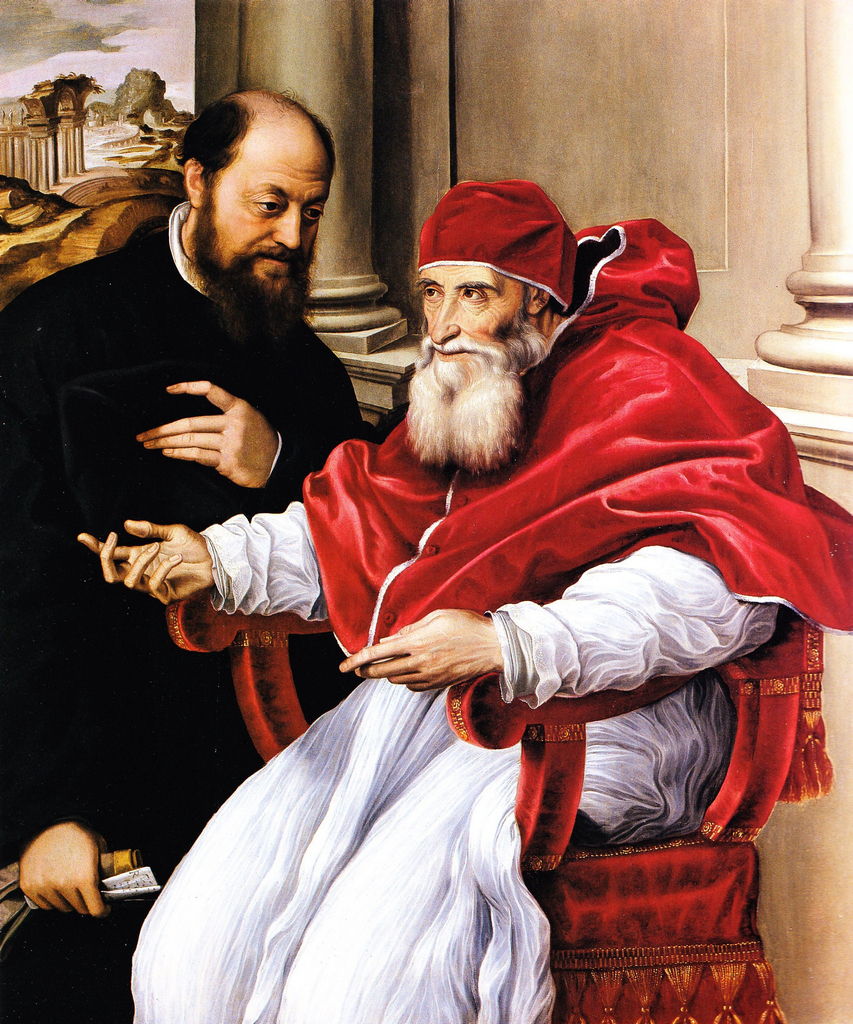
Pole with Paul III in a 1539 portrait by Perino del Vaga

On 22 December 1536, Pole, already a deacon, was created a cardinal over Pole's own objections. He was the fourth of the five English cardinals of the first half of the sixteenth century. (Note: The other four Cardinals were Christopher Bainbridge, Thomas Wolsey, John Fisher, and William Petow.) He also became papal legate to England in February 1536/1537. Pope Paul III put him in charge of organising assistance for the Pilgrimage of Grace (and related movements), an effort to organise a march on London to demand Henry replace his ‘reformist’ advisers with more traditional, Catholic minds; neither Francis I of France nor the Emperor supported this effort, and the English government tried to have Pole assassinated. In 1539, Pole was sent to the Emperor to organise an embargo against England – the sort of countermeasure he had himself warned Henry was possible.

The King, with Pole himself out of his reach, took revenge on Pole's family for engaging in treason by word against the King. This later became known as the Exeter Conspiracy. The leading members were arrested, and all their properties seized. This destroyed the Pole family. Sir Geoffrey Pole was arrested in August 1538; he had been corresponding with Reginald. The investigation of Henry Courtenay, 1st Marquess of Exeter (Henry VIII's first cousin and the Countess of Salisbury's first cousin once removed) had turned up his name. Sir Geoffrey appealed to Thomas Cromwell, who had him arrested and interrogated. Under interrogation, Sir Geoffrey admitted that Henry Pole, 1st Baron Montagu, and Exeter had both been parties to his correspondence with Reginald. Montagu, Exeter, and Lady Salisbury were arrested in November 1538, together with Henry Pole and other family members, on charges of treason. This was despite Cromwell having previously written that they had "little offended save that he [Reginald Pole] is of their kin". They were committed to the Tower of London and, apart from Geoffrey Pole, they were all eventually executed.

In January 1539, Sir Geoffrey was pardoned. Montagu and Exeter were tried and executed for treason. Reginald Pole was attainted in absentia. In May 1539, Montagu, Exeter, Lady Salisbury, and others were also attainted, as her father had been; this meant that they lost their lands – mostly in the South of England, conveniently located (alleged the crown) to assist any invasion – and titles. Those still alive in the Tower were also sentenced to death, and so could be executed at the King's will. As part of the evidence given in support of the Bill of Attainder, Cromwell produced a tunic bearing the Five Wounds of Christ, purported to show Lady Salisbury's support of traditional Catholicism. This, supposedly, came to light six months after her house and effects had already been searched when she was arrested. It is likely to have been planted there.

Margaret Pole was held in the Tower of London for two and a half years under severe conditions; she, her grandson (Montagu's son), and Exeter's son were held together on orders of the King. In 1540, Cromwell himself fell from favour and was himself attainted and executed. Margaret was finally executed in 1541, protesting her innocence until the last – a highly publicised case considered a grave miscarriage of justice both at the time and later. Her execution was gruesome, botched by an inexperienced executioner, who delivered nearly a dozen blows before she was finally killed. Pole is known to have said that he would "never fear to call himself the son of a martyr". Some 350 years later, in 1886, Margaret was beatified by Pope Leo XIII. Aside from the hostile treatise Pro ecclesiasticae unitatis defensione, another contribution fuelling King Henry's brutality towards the Pole family might have been that Pole's mother, Margaret, was one of the last surviving members of the House of Plantagenet. Under some circumstances, that line of descent could have made Reginald – until he definitely entered the clergy – a possible contender for the throne itself.

In 1542 Reginald Pole was appointed as one of the three papal legates to preside over the Council of Trent. In the 1549–1550 papal conclave which followed the death of Pope Paul III in 1549, Pole, at one point, had 26 out of the 28 votes he needed to become pope himself. His personal belief in justification by faith alone over works had caused him problems at Trent and accusations of heretical crypto-Lutheranism at the conclave. Thomas Hoby, visiting Rome so as to be present in the city during the conclave, recorded that Pole failed to be elected "by the Cardinall of Ferrara his meanes the voice of manie cardinalls of the French partie, persuading them that Cardinall Pole was both Imperiall and also a verie Lutheran".

== Later years ==
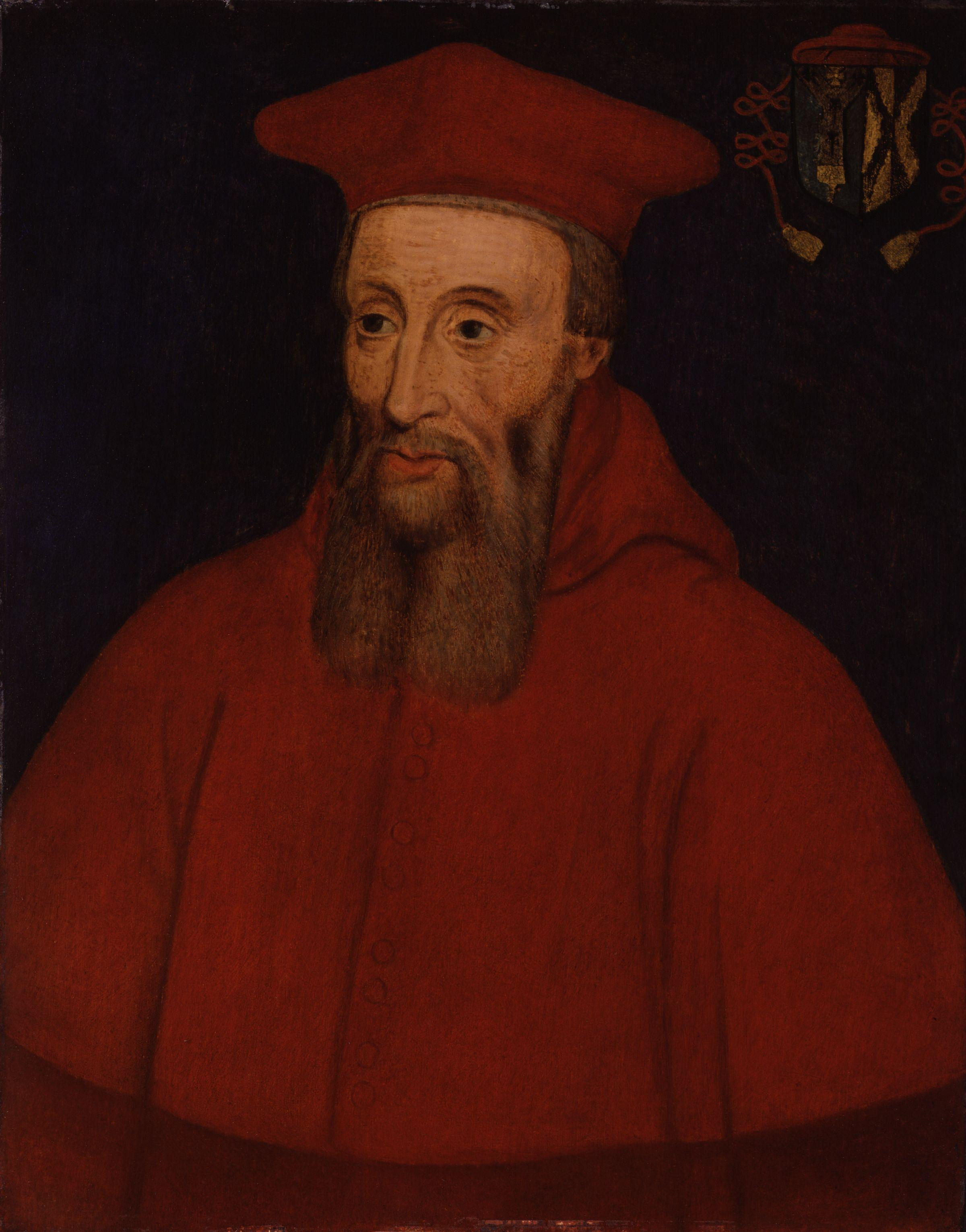
Pole as a cardinal

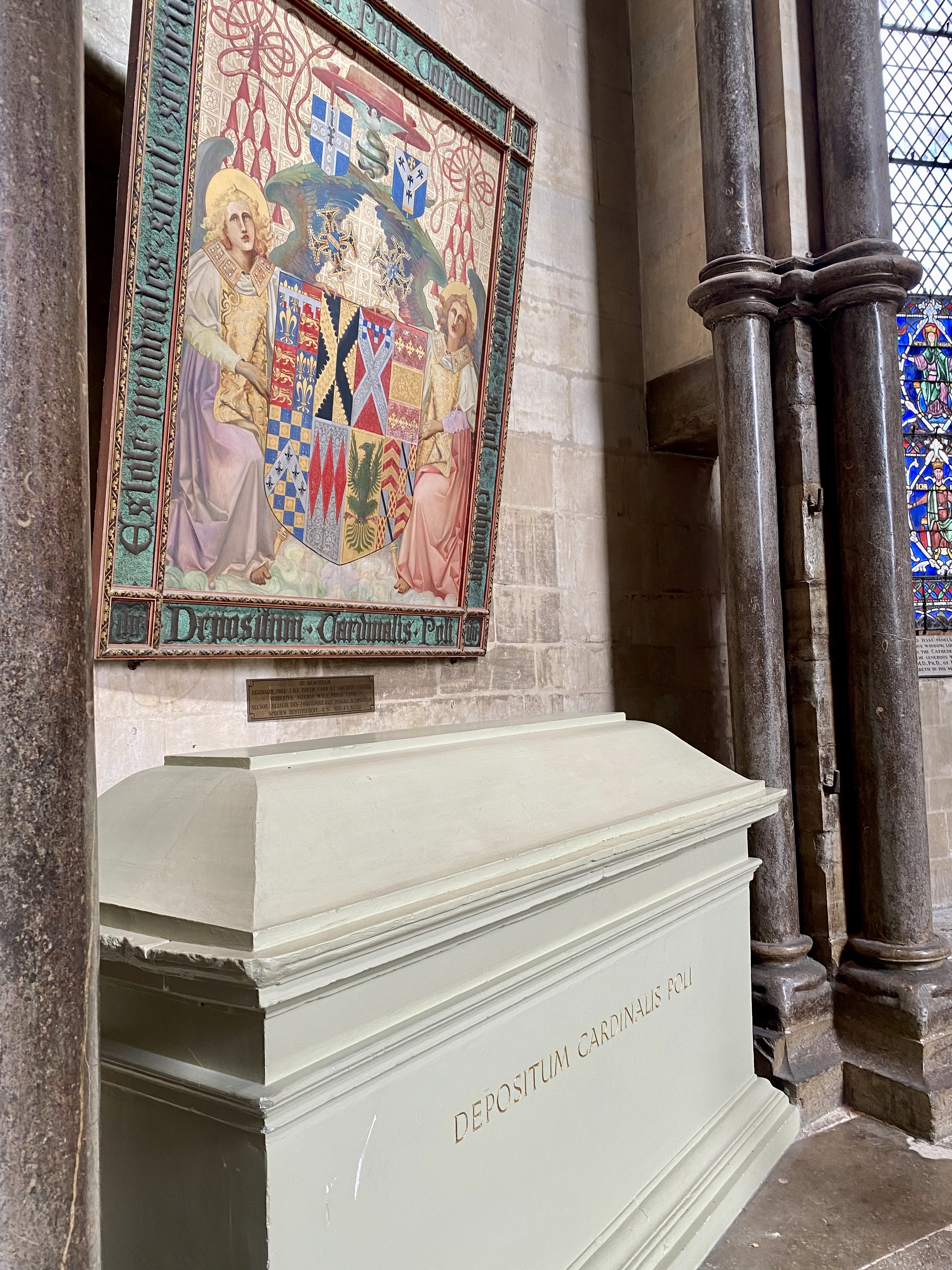
Pole's tomb at Canterbury Cathedral

The death of Edward VI on 6 July 1553 and the accession of Mary I to the throne of England hastened Pole's return from exile, as a papal legate to England (which he remained until 1557) with a view to receiving the kingdom back into the Catholic fold. However, Queen Mary I and Emperor Charles V delayed his arrival in the country until 20 November 1554, due to concerns that Pole might oppose Mary's forthcoming marriage to Charles's son, Philip of Spain. It was only after the marriage was safely out of the way, that the English parliament finally set about repealing his attainder on 22 November 1554.

Pole opened his papal commission and presented his legatine credentials before Philip & Mary and the assembled members of Parliament at the Palace of Whitehall on 27 November 1554, delivering a notable oration before them. Among the dignitaries in attendance was Stephen Gardiner, Bishop of Winchester and Lord Chancellor of England, the most prominent Catholic minister in England, who would steer the restoration of Catholicism through parliament in January 1555.

As papal legate, Pole negotiated a papal dispensation allowing the new owners of confiscated former monastic lands to retain these. In return for this concession, Parliament then enabled the Revival of the Heresy Acts in January 1555. This revived former measures against heresy: the letters patent of 1382 of Richard II, the Suppression of Heresy Act 1400 (2 Hen. 4. c. 15) of Henry IV, and the Suppression of Heresy Act 1414 (2 Hen. 5. Stat. 1. c. 7) of Henry V. All of these had been repealed under Henry VIII and Edward VI. On 13 November 1555, Thomas Cranmer was officially deprived of the See of Canterbury. The Pope promoted Pole to the rank of cardinal-priest and made him administrator of the See of Canterbury on 11 December 1555.

Pole was finally ordained a priest on 20 March 1556 and consecrated a bishop two days later, becoming archbishop of Canterbury. an office he would hold until his death. In 1555 and 1555/1556 respectively he also became chancellor of both Oxford and Cambridge universities. As well as his religious duties, he was in effect the Queen's chief minister and adviser. Many former enemies, including Cranmer, signed recantations affirming their religious belief in transubstantiation and papal supremacy. Despite this, which should have absolved them under Mary's own Revival of the Heresy Acts, the Queen could not forget their responsibility for the annulment of her mother's marriage.

In 1555, Queen Mary began permitting the burning of Protestants for heresy, and some 220 men and 60 women were executed before her death in 1558. In the view of some historians, these Marian persecutions contributed to the ultimate victory of the English Reformation, though Pole's involvement in these heresy trials is disputed. Pole was in failing health during the worst period of persecution, and there is some evidence that he favoured a more lenient approach: "Three condemned heretics from Bonner's diocese were pardoned on an appeal to him; he merely enjoined a penance and gave them absolution."

Despite being a lifelong devout Catholic, Pole had a long-running dispute with Pope Paul IV, dating from before the latter's election as Pope. Elected in 1555, Paul IV had a distaste for Catholic humanism and men like Pole who pushed a softer version of Catholicism to win over Protestants. He was also fiercely anti-Spanish, opposing Queen Mary's marriage to Philip II of Spain and rejecting Pole's support for it. Because of this disagreement, Paul first cancelled Pole's legatine authority, and then sought to recall Pole to Rome to face investigation for heresy in his early writings. Mary refused to send Pole to Rome, yet accepted his suspension from office.

In the will of Sir Robert Acton dated 24 September 1558, Pole is named as one of the Executors, despite the fact that Acton expressed himself in terms consistent with his dying in the Protestant faith. Pole died in London, during an influenza epidemic, on 17 November 1558, at about 7:00 pm, nearly 12 hours after Queen Mary's death. He was buried on the north side of the Corona at Canterbury Cathedral.

== Author ==
Pole was the author of De Concilio, of a treatise on the authority of the pope and of a set of measures introduced by him to restore Catholic practice in England. He was also the author of many important letters, full of interest for the history of the time, edited by Angelo Maria Quirini.

Pole is known for his strong condemnation of Machiavelli's book The Prince, which he read in Italy, and on which he commented: "I found this type of book to be written by an enemy of the human race. It explains every means whereby religion, justice and any inclination toward virtue could be destroyed".

== In popular culture ==
Cardinal Pole is an 1863 novel by William Harrison Ainsworth. Cardinal Pole is a major character in the historical novels The Time Before You Die by Lucy Beckett, The Courier's Tale by Peter Walker and The Trusted Servant by Alison Macleod, and features in Hilary Mantel's novel The Mirror & the Light, the third and last of her novels on the life of Thomas Cromwell.

Reginald Pole is a major character in Queen of Martyrs: The Story of Mary I by Samantha Wilcoxson.

Reginald Pole, along with his brothers, sister, and mother, are the central family in Philippa Gregory's historical novel The King's Curse.

Cardinal Reginald Pole is a major supporting character in Rosamund Gravelle's play Three Queens, with the role first played by Les Kenny-Green.

== See also ==
- Nicodemite

== Sources ==
- Edwards, John (2014). Archbishop Pole. (American edition: New York 2016). Ashgate Pub. Co. ISBN 978-1-317-17971-9.
- Edwards, John (2011). Mary I: England's Catholic Queen. New Haven CT USA: Yale University Press. ISBN 978-0-300-17743-5.
- Fenlon, Dermot (1972). Heresy and Obedience in Tridentine Italy: Cardinal Pole and the Counter Reformation. Cambridge University Press. ISBN 978-0-521-20005-9.
- Gairdner, James (1903). The English Church in the Sixteenth Century (London, 1903)
- Haile, Martin (1910). Life of Reginald Pole. New York: Longmans, Green, and Company. [pseudonym of Marie Hallé]
- Mayer, Thomas F. (2000). Reginald Pole: Prince and Prophet. Cambridge University Press. ISBN 978-0-521-37188-9.
- Lee, F. G. (1888). Reginald Pole, Cardinal Archbishop of Canterbury: An Historical Sketch (London, 1888)
- Phillips, T. (1764). History of the Life of Reginald Pole (two volumes, Oxford, 1764), the earliest English.
- Stewart, A. M. (1882). Life of Cardinal Pole (London, 1882)
- Tellechea Idigoras, Jose Ignacio (1977). Fray Bartolome Carranza Y El Cardenal Pole: Un Navarro En La Restauracion Catolica De Inglaterra (1554–1558) Diputacion Foral de Navarra, Institucion Principe de Viana, Consejo Superior de Investigaciones Cientificas. 1977. ISBN 84-235-0066-7.
- Zimmermann, Athanasius (1893). Kardinal Pole: sein Leben und seine Schriften (Regensberg, 1893)

=== Attribution ===
Catholic Church titles
Preceded by Thomas Cranmer	Archbishop of Canterbury; 1556–1558	Succeeded by Matthew Parker
Academic offices
Preceded by John Mason	Chancellor of the University of Oxford; 1556–1558	Succeeded by The Earl of Arundel
Preceded by Stephen Gardiner	Chancellor of the University of Cambridge; 1556–1558	Succeeded by Lord Burghley
