= John Bourchier (regicide) =

English politician (1595–1660)

Sir John Bourchier JP
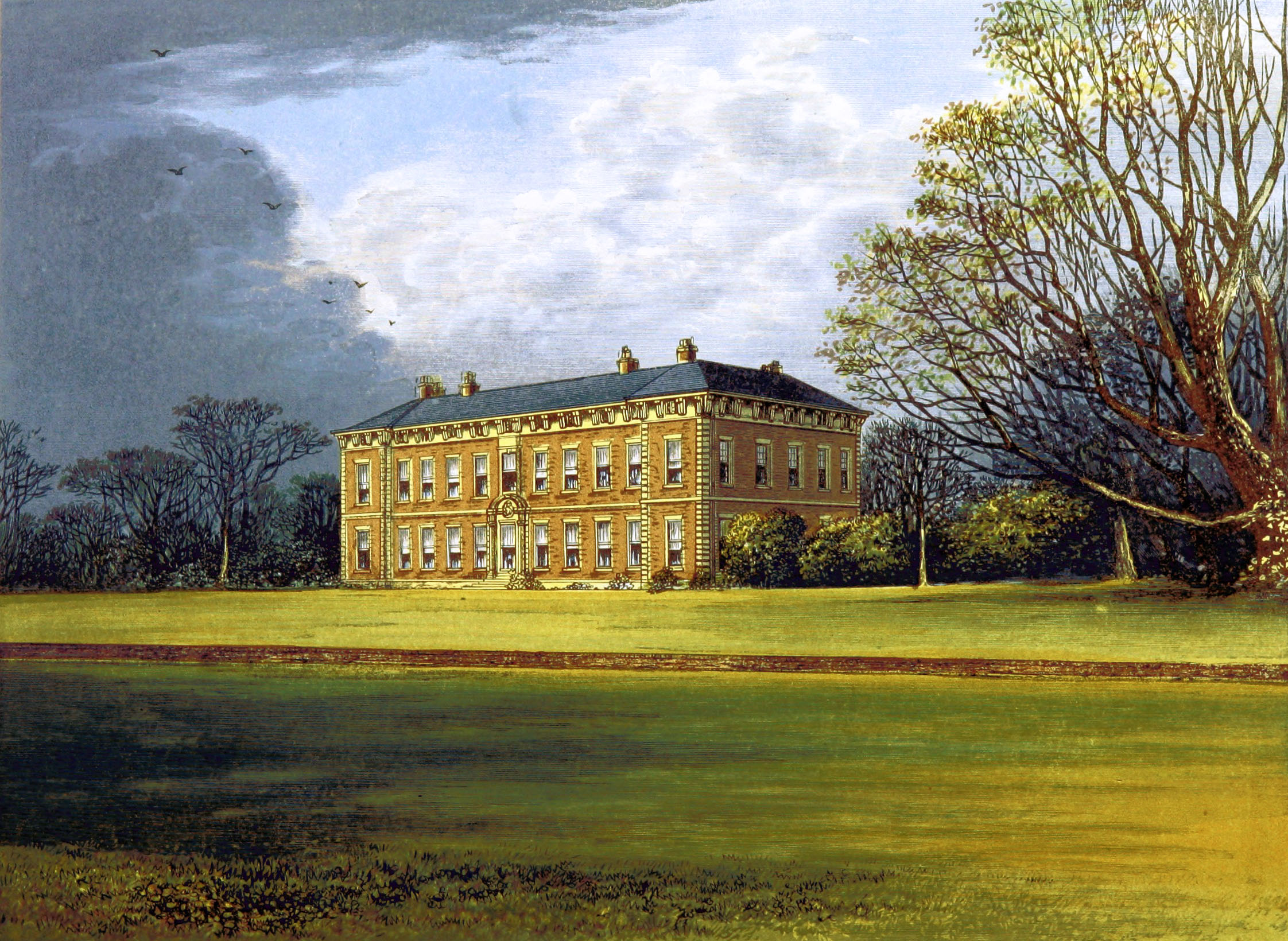
- Beningbrough Hall, rebuilt in 1716, owned by the Bourchier family until 1827

Council of State
- In office March 1652 – July 1652

Member of Parliament for Ripon
- In office March 1647 – April 1653

Personal details
- Born: 1 January 1595 Beningbrough Hall
- Died: 9 August 1660 (aged 65) London
- Resting place: St Mary Magdalen, Milk Street
- Party: Parliamentarian
- Spouse: Anne Rolfe (1619-1649)
- Children: Bridget (1620-1662), Barrington (1627-1695), Elizabeth
- Education: Christ's College, Cambridge
- Occupation: Landowner and Puritan activist

Sir John Bourchier or Bourcher (c. 1595 – August 1660) was an English landowner and Puritan radical, who supported the Parliamentarian cause during the Wars of the Three Kingdoms. A regicide who voted for the Execution of Charles I in January 1649, he died in August 1660 awaiting trial following the Stuart Restoration.

== Personal details ==
John Bourchier was born in 1595, eldest surviving son of William Bourchier (1559-c.1631) and Katherine Barrington (c.1565–1623). His father was declared legally incompetent in 1598, the same year as his grandfather Sir Ralph Bourchier died. He was brought up by his mother and maternal uncle Sir Francis Barrington, a devout Puritan jailed by Charles I for opposing the Forced Loan in 1627. This relationship deeply influenced his nephew's political and religious beliefs.

== Career ==
He was probably educated at Christ's College, Cambridge, and was admitted to Gray's Inn in 1609/10. He was knighted in 1619.

In 1625, Bourchier was appointed as a Justice of the Peace for the three Yorkshire Ridings. When Charles dissolved Parliament and sought to raise money through the forced loans in 1627, Sir John was one of those who refused. At the outbreak of the English Civil War, he was arrested and imprisoned in York until 1643. He was elected Member of Parliament for Ripon in 1647; at Pride's Purge, he was one of the MPs permitted to keep his seat in Commons.

As a judge at the trial of King Charles, he was one of the signatories of the King's death warrant. After the Restoration, May 1660, Bourchier was too ill to be tried as a regicide, and died, unrepentant, a few months later.

"During these contests between the two Houses, touching the exceptions to be made, Sir John Bourchier, who had been one of the King's judges, and had rendered himself within the time limit by the proclamation, being of a great age and very infirm, was permitted to lodge at a private house belonging to one of his daughters. In this place he was seized with so dangerous a fit of illness, that those about him who were his nearest relations, despairing of his recovery, and presuming that an acknowledgment from him of his sorrow, for the part he had in the condemnation of the King, might tend to procure some favour to them from those in power, they earnestly pressed him to give them that satisfaction. But he being highly displeased with their request, rose suddenly from his chair, which for some days he had not been able to do without assistance; and receiving fresh vigour from the memory of that action, said, 'I tell you, it was a just act; God and all good men will own it.' And having thus expressed himself, he sat down again, and soon after quietly ended his life."

== Sources ==
- Scott, David (2004). "Bourchier, Sir John (1595-1660". Oxford Dictionary of National Biography (online ed.). Oxford University Press. doi:10.1093/ref:odnb/2991. (Subscription, Wikipedia Library access or UK public library membership required.)
- Thrush, Andrew (2004). "Barrington, Sir Francis, first baronet (c. 1560–1628)". Oxford Dictionary of National Biography (online ed.). Oxford University Press. doi:10.1093/ref:odnb/70267. (Subscription, Wikipedia Library access or UK public library membership required.)
