= Warbeck =

Warbeck is a surname. Notable people with the surname include:

- David Warbeck (1941–1997), New Zealand actor
- Perkin Warbeck (c. 1474–1499), pretender to the English throne during the reign of King Henry VII
  - Perkin Warbeck (play), 17th-century history play by John Ford
  - The Fortunes of Perkin Warbeck, 1830 historical novel by Mary Shelley
- Stephen Warbeck (born 1953), English composer
