= Perkin Warbeck (play) =

17th century historical play

Perkin Warbeck is a Caroline era history play by John Ford regarding pretender to the throne Perkin Warbeck. It is generally ranked as one of Ford's three masterpieces, along with 'Tis Pity She's a Whore and The Broken Heart. T. S. Eliot went so far as to call Perkin Warbeck "unquestionably Ford's highest achievement...one of the very best historical plays outside of the works of Shakespeare in the whole of Elizabethan and Jacobean drama."

== Date, performance, publication ==
The play's date of authorship is uncertain, though it is widely thought to have been written in the 1629–34 period. It was first published in 1634, as The Chronicle History of Perkin Warbeck. A Strange Truth. The quarto was issued by the bookseller Hugh Beeston, with a dedication by Ford to William Cavendish, 1st Duke of Newcastle. The title page bears Ford's anagrammatic motto, "Fide Honor," and states that the play was performed "(some-times)" by Queen Henrietta's Men at the Phoenix or Cockpit Theatre.

A second edition appeared in 1714 in duodecimo format. Ford's play was reportedly revived at Goodman's Fields in 1745, during Bonnie Prince Charlie's invasion of England; two other contemporary plays about Warbeck were also acted at that time. After 1745, the next production occurred in 1975 at Stratford-upon-Avon.

An abridged version of the play was included in Episodes 23, "Ghosts", and 24, "The Pretender", of the 1977 BBC Radio 4 drama series Vivat Rex.

== Authorship, sources ==
The play is credited to Ford in contemporaneous sources, though some critics have argued that is it sufficiently atypical of his work to raise the possibility of a second hand in the play— possibly Ford's repeated collaborator Thomas Dekker. Other scholars disagree, and assign the play to Ford alone.

Ford's primary historical sources for the play were The History of the Reign of King Henry VII by Francis Bacon (1622) and The True and Wonderful History of Perkin Warbeck by Thomas Gainsford (1618). A manuscript of the play exists, though it is a late product, dating to around 1745, and offers little additional insight into the play.

== Characters ==
Britons

- Henry VII
- Lord Dawbney
- Sir William Stanley
- Earl of Oxford
- Earl of Surrey
- Fox
- Urswick
- Sir Robert Clifford
- Lambert Simnel

Scots

- James IV
- Earl of Huntley
- Lady Katherine Gordon
- Jane Douglas
- Earl of Crawford
- Countess of Crawford
- Lord Dalyell
- Marchmont

Rebels

- Perkin Warbeck
- Stephen Frion
- John A-Water
- Heron
- Sketon
- Astley

Spaniards

- Hialas

== Genre and plot ==
The history play was rather outmoded in the Caroline era—a fact that Ford himself mentions in the Prologue to his play: "Studies have of this nature been of late / So out of fashion, so unfollowed..." (lines 1–2). Ford sticks close to his historical sources, more so than most playwrights of the English Renaissance era who ventured into the history-play genre. Ford's Warbeck, like his historical model, claims to be "Richard IV," one of the princes supposedly murdered in the Tower of London during the reign of Richard III, but who allegedly escaped to champion the cause of the House of York. The Scottish invasion and two Cornish uprisings are shown; but Warbeck's efforts to win the crown are not successful, the Spanish peacemaker Pedro de Ayala appears as 'Hialas.' Ford departs from his sources in one notable instance: he depicts the captured Warbeck in an encounter with Lambert Simnel, another defeated pretender to the throne who has renounced his claim and been pardoned. Simnel offers Warbeck the same chance, but Warbeck refuses to yield. In the play's climactic final scene, Warbeck is placed in the stocks, a public humiliation preceding his execution; Warbeck's followers are shown with halters around their necks as they too are led to death.

Overall, Ford treats Warbeck with sympathy and compassion; without actively taking Warbeck's part, he strives for a neutral treatment, in contrast with the overwhelmingly negative tone of official Tudor historiography.

== Critical responses ==
This "fascinating, troubling play" has provoked a large and growing body of critical commentary. "Criticism of the play...has centered upon the psychological, the political, and the paradoxical." Critics have disagreed about the sanity of Ford's Warbeck, the political message of the play, and even whether it is history or "Anti-History."
