= John Deydras =

C14 pretender to the English throne

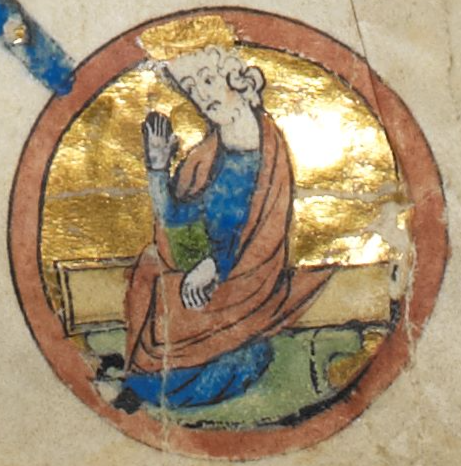
- Deydras was said to uncannily resemble Edward II, shown here in a contemporary picture.
- Died: 1318; Oxford, England.
- Other names: John of Powderham
- Occupation: Clerk
- Known for: A royal pretender

John Deydras (died 1318), also known as John of Powderham, was a pretender to the English throne during the reign of Edward II. He was executed by hanging and his body was burnt.

== Background ==
By 1318, Edward II of England was increasingly unpopular in England as a result of his style of government and his defeats while fighting Robert the Bruce of Scotland. Opposition was growing to his rule, when a young clerk in Oxford, John Deydras, also known as John of Powderham, issued claims that he was in fact the rightful heir to the throne.

== Deydras' claims and execution ==
Deydras arrived at Beaumont Palace in Oxford in early 1318, and claimed it for his own. He was, he said, really the King of England, and observers noted that he closely resembled Edward, being tall and good-looking. Unlike the king, Deydras, however, was missing an ear. Deydras explained that as a baby, the royal servant charged to look after him had allowed him to be attacked by a sow while he was playing in the castle courtyard, which had bitten off his ear. Knowing that she would have been severely punished by the King, she had replaced him with a carter's baby, who had then grown up to become Edward II, while Deydras had been given to the carter to be brought up in poverty. This explained, said Deydras, Edward's style of government and his strange dislike of martial activities – notoriously, Edward enjoyed many rustic, lower class pursuits such as ditch digging and farming. Deydras offered to fight Edward in single combat for the throne. Rumours began to spread across England.

Deydras was finally arrested and brought to Edward at Northampton. Deydras insulted the king, again offered to fight him in single combat and repeated his claims about Edward's parentage, resulting in a trial for sedition. Deydras confessed during the trial to having made up his story, blaming his pet cat which he said was the devil in disguise, who had led him astray one day while he was walking across Christ Church Meadows. Found guilty, both he and his cat were hanged and Deydras' body burnt.

== Legacy ==
Today, Deydras is believed to have been mentally ill; his story is not believed to have been true. Modern historians cite the case of Deydras as an example of the growing unhappiness with Edward II's rule during the period, and the protracted case appears to have deeply affected Isabella of France, Edward's wife, who felt humiliated by the event.

== See also ==
- Lambert Simnel – passed off as Edward Plantagenet, 17th Earl of Warwick, in a Yorkist insurgency arranged by John de la Pole, 1st Earl of Lincoln, to capture the throne from King Henry VII
- Perkin Warbeck – pretender to the throne by claiming to be Richard of Shrewsbury, Duke of York, the younger of the Princes in the Tower
- Mary Baynton – claimed to be (the future) Queen Mary I, eldest child of King Henry VIII
- The Prince and the Pauper – a humorous children's novel by Mark Twain in which King Edward VI trades places with a double

== Bibliography ==
- Doherty, Paul. (2003) Isabella and the Strange Death of Edward II. London: Robinson.
- Weir, Alison. (2006) Isabella: She-Wolf of France, Queen of England. London: Pimlico.
