= Mary Baynton =

Mary Baynton (born approximately 1515) was a woman from England, who claimed to be the Princess Mary, daughter of King Henry VIII and his first wife, Catherine of Aragon. She made the claim in Boston, Lincolnshire, and it appears that the claims were taken seriously in the turbulent times. However, after investigation, she was dismissed as a lunatic and subsequently ignored.

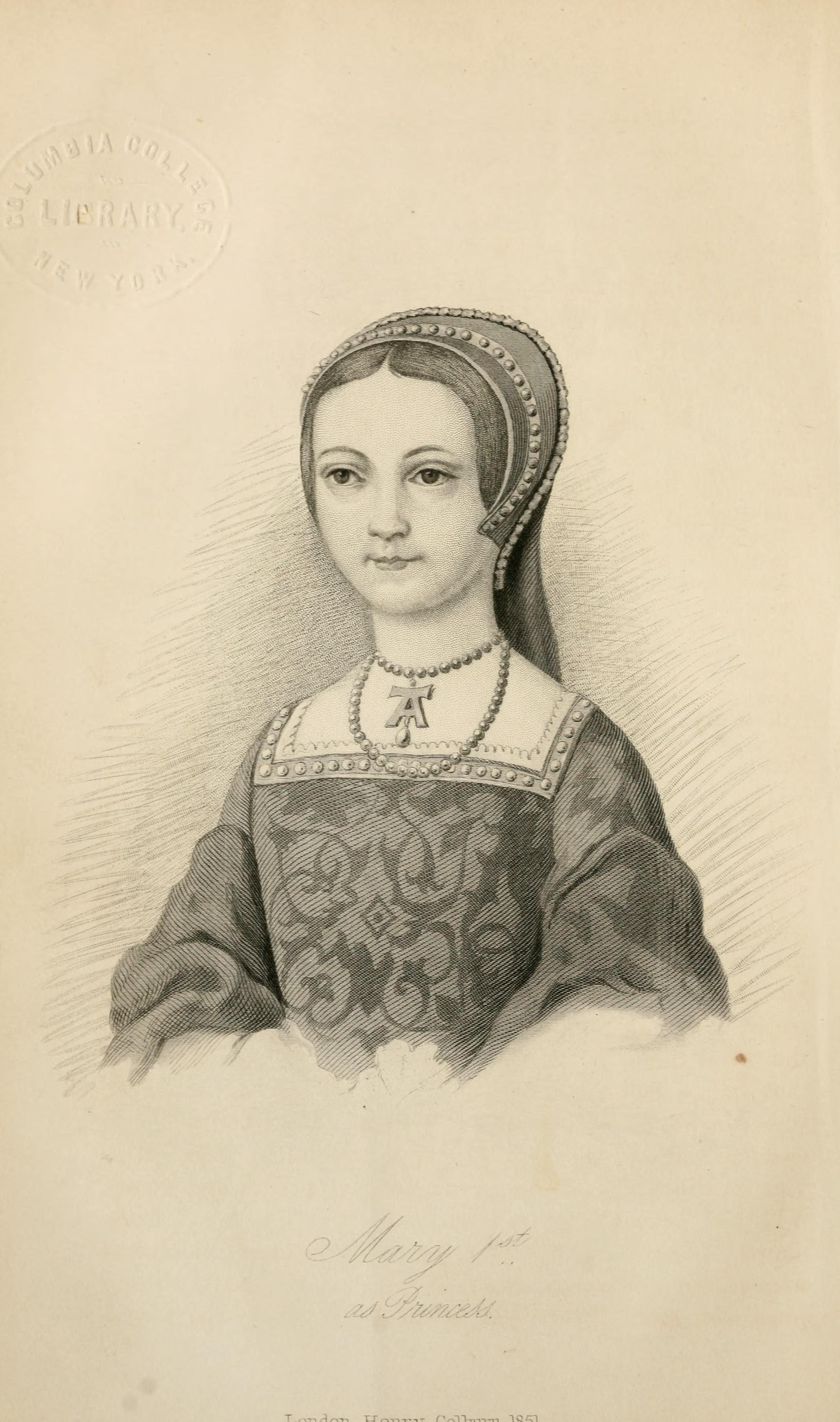
Princess Mary, whom Mary Baynton impersonated.

== Biography ==
Mary Baynton was born in approximately 1515, daughter of Thomas Baynton who lived in Bridlington, East Riding of Yorkshire. In September 1533, when Mary was 18, she publicly announced to the town of Boston, Lincolnshire, that she was Princess Mary, eldest daughter of Henry VIII. Princess Mary had been declared illegitimate and removed from the line of succession a few months earlier when Henry had repudiated the authority of the Pope. Amongst the confusion caused by these political events, Baynton's claims were considered seriously, with some individual even offering to fund her travel to Spain to win support to be recognised as heir to the throne.

Baynton was arrested and investigated by officials, who dismissed her as a 'self-deluded lunatic'. She has been investigated by several historians, however it is uncertain what happened to her. It appears she was left alone, and settled down to a quiet life.

== See also ==
- Lambert Simnel – who was passed off as Edward Plantagenet, 17th Earl of Warwick
- Perkin Warbeck – who claimed to be Richard of Shrewsbury, Duke of York
- John Deydras – who claimed to be the true Edward II
- William Featherstone – who claimed to be Edward VI
