= Edward Brampton =

Sir Edward Brampton, (Portuguese: Duarte Brandão) KG (c.1440–1508) was the Governor of Guernsey, a knight, adventurer, ship commander and the godson and protégé of King Edward IV of England.

== Origins ==
Duarte Brandão came from the Jewish community of Portugal. He was brought up in the Jewish faith, but his parentage is uncertain. It has been suggested that his mother was Christian and his father, Rui Barba, was Jewish. Another version is that “Rui Barba was a Christian who begat Edward Brampton out of wedlock with the wife of a Jew.” Later Portuguese genealogy records indicate that his father could have been Fernão Rodrigues Alardo, the main alcaide of Leiria and Óbidos.

== Life in England ==
Born in about 1440 in the Jewish community in Lisbon, Portugal, his mother's name was Mariana and his father was a blacksmith, Duarte emigrated to England during the late 1450s. In order to be accepted at court, he converted to Catholic Christianity, with King Edward IV standing as his sponsor. Upon his conversion, he adopted the English name of Edward Brampton in honour of his Sponsors. Brampton was an adventurer, soldier, and ship's commander, who fought in several engagements during the War of the Roses, including the Battle of Tewkesbury, and was eventually awarded the position of Governor of Guernsey. With the help of his wife Lady Margaret Brampton, he won favours in both the Portuguese and English royal courts and was knighted in August 1484 by Richard III.

Following the defeat of Richard III, Brampton left England for the court of Margaret of Burgundy, where it is presumed he met Perkin Warbeck, a pretender to the throne of England, who he later employed.

From his marriage to Lady Margaret Brampton, he had six children: João, Jorge, Henrique, Isabel, Maria and Joana.

== Popular culture ==
In the novel The Family, by Mario Puzo, Duarte Brandão is depicted as an escapee from England who becomes the personal advisor of Pope Alexander VI (Borgia), a mortal opponent of Savonarola.

In the novel A Song of Sixpence, by Judith Arnopp, Brampton features as the rescuer of Richard of Shrewsbury from the Tower of London.
