= Battle of Deal =

The Battle of Deal took place on 3 July 1495 in the port town of Deal in Kent when forces of the pretender Perkin Warbeck attempted a landing and were driven off by supporters of the Tudor monarch Henry VII. Warbeck's 1,500 men included many Continental mercenaries hired on his behalf by Margaret of York, while the Tudor fighters were mainly Kentish locals. Fierce fighting took place on the steeply sloping beach. After withdrawing by sea, Warbeck then went to Ireland where he launched an equally unsuccessful Siege of Waterford where two of his ship were sunk and the nine other ships were repelled.

== Bibliography ==
- Thomas Penn. Winter King: Henry VII and the Dawn of Tudor England. Simon and Schuster, 2013.
- Linda Porter. Crown of Thistles: The Fatal Inheritance of Mary Queen of Scots. Macmillan, 2013.
