= Lady Catherine Gordon =

Scottish noblewoman (1474-1537)

Catherine Gordon
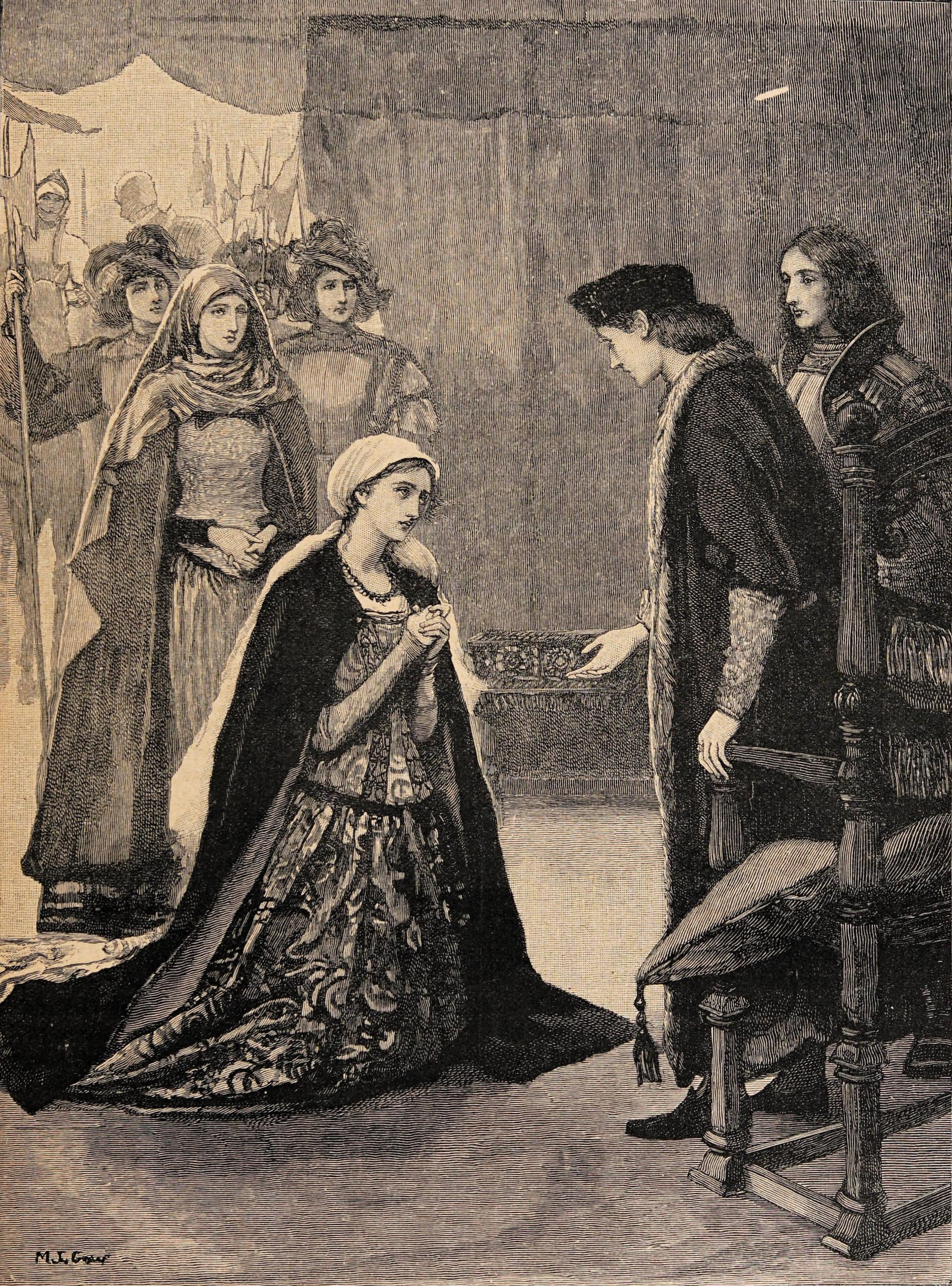
- Lady Catherine Gordon before Henry VII (Mary L. Gow, c. 1900)
- Born: c. 1474
- Died: October 1537 (aged 62–63)
- Buried: Church of St. Nicholas, Fyfield
- Noble family: Clan Gordon
- Spouse: Perkin Warbeck (m. 1496; died 1499) James Strangeways (m. 1512; died 1515) Matthew Craddock (m. 1517; died 1533) Christopher Ashton (m. 1533)
- Father: George Gordon, 2nd Earl of Huntly
- Mother: Elizabeth Hay

Lady Catherine Gordon (c. 1474–October 1537) was a Scottish noblewoman and the wife of Yorkist pretender Perkin Warbeck, who claimed he was Richard of Shrewsbury, Duke of York. After her imprisonment by King Henry VII of England, she became a lady-in-waiting of his wife, Elizabeth of York. She had a total of four husbands, but there are no records of any surviving children.

== Family ==
Lady Catherine was born in Scotland, the daughter of George Gordon, 2nd Earl of Huntly, by his third wife, Lady Elizabeth Hay. Some 19th-century writers had assumed she was a daughter of King James I's daughter Annabella, who had been the Earl of Huntly's first wife. (Note: Her mother was apparently not Annabella as some accounts have stated, as the Earl of Huntly divorced Annabella in 1471. Catherine's effigy in Swansea church has the Gordon and Hay (not Stewart) arms impaled with those of Craddock indicating she was a daughter of Elizabeth Hay, probably her eldest. Catherine was given in marriage by King James IV as his cousin, which she would be either as a daughter of Annabella Stewart by consanguinity or as a daughter of Elizabeth Hay through affinity. So being called a cousin of the Scottish king did not require she necessarily be Annabella's daughter. J. E. Cussans, 'Notes on the Perkin Warbeck Insurrection', in, Transactions of the Royal Historical Society, vol. 1 (1872), p. 63: The Scots Peerage, Founded on Wood's Edition of Sir Robert Douglas's Peerage of Scotland, ed. James Balfour Paul, Vol. IV Edinburgh: David Douglas, (1907), pp. 530-1: Records of Aboyne (1894), 411)

=== Perkin Warbeck ===
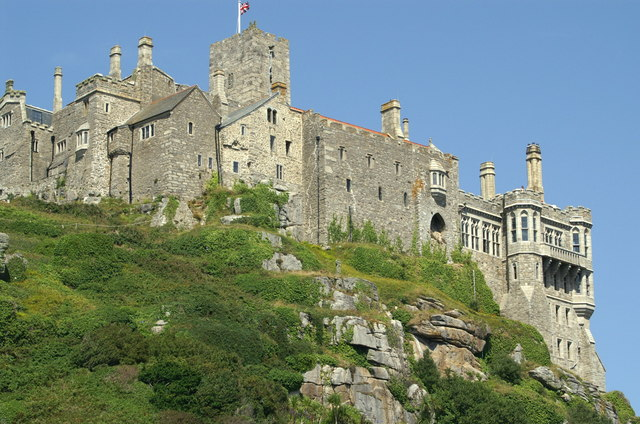
Lady Catherine "Duchess of York" was captured at St. Michael's Mount on the Cornish coast in 1497

Before 4 March 1497, Lady Catherine was given in marriage to the pretender Perkin Warbeck, who was favoured by King James IV of Scotland for political reasons, and who had apparently been courting her since 1495. A copy of a love letter from Warbeck to Lady Catherine Gordon survives:

Most noble lady, it is not without reason that all turn their eyes to you; that all admire love and obey you. For they see your two-fold virtues by which you are so much distinguished above all other mortals. Whilst on the one hand, they admire your riches and immutable prosperity, which secure to you the nobility of your lineage and the loftiness of your rank, they are, on the other hand, struck by your rather divine than human beauty, and believe that you are not born in our days but descended from Heaven.
All look at your face so bright and serene that it gives splendour to the cloudy sky; all look at your eyes so brilliant as stars which make all pain to be forgotten, and turn despair into delight; all look at your neck which outshines pearls; all look at your fine forehead. Your purple light of youth, your fair hair; in one word at the splendid perfection of your person:—and looking at they cannot choose but admire you; admiring they cannot choose but to love you; loving they cannot choose but to obey you.
I shall, perhaps, be the happiest of all your admirers, and the happiest man on earth, since I have reason to hope you will think me worthy of your love. If I represent to my mind all your perfections, I am not only compelled to love, to adore, and to worship you, but love makes me your slave. Whether I was waking or sleeping I cannot find rest or happiness except in your affection. All my hopes rest in you, and in you alone.
Most noble lady, my soul, look mercifully down upon me, your slave; who has ever been devoted to you from the first hour he saw you. Love is not an earthly thing, it is heaven born. Do not think it below yourself to obey love's dictates. Not only kings, but also gods and goddesses have bent their necks beneath its yoke.
I beseech you most noble lady to accept for ever one who in all things will cheerfully do your will as long as his days shall last. Farewell, my soul and consolation. You, the brightest ornament in Scotland, farewell, farewell.

James IV gave Perkin Warbeck a 'spousing goune' of white damask for the wedding at Edinburgh, and the celebrations probably on 13 January 1496, Saint Mungo's day, included a tournament. Warbeck wore armour covered with purple brocade.

Lady Catherine, now called the Duchess of York, sailed from Ayr with Perkin with Guy Foulcart in the Cuckoo dressed in a new tanny coloured "sea gown" and a black cloak. The fabrics for her clothes had been delivered to the wardrobe of James IV by the owners of the merchant ships the Douglas and Christopher.

She was taken prisoner at St. Michael's Mount after King Henry's forces captured Warbeck's Cornish army at Exeter in October 1497. Henry VII allowed £20 for her expenses, and on 15 October 1497 Robert Southwell was paid £7 13s. 4d. for horses, saddles and other necessities for the transportation of "my Lady Kateryn Huntleye" to London. Her husband was hanged at Tyburn on 23 November 1499. Lady Catherine was kept a virtual prisoner by Henry VII but accorded high status as a Scottish aristocrat, perhaps to embarrass James IV. She was placed in the household of his wife Elizabeth of York, at Sheen, where she became a lady-in-waiting.

=== Life as Warbeck's Widow ===
Henry VII paid some of her expenses from his privy purse and gave her clothing. The privy purse accounts record her name as "Lady Kateryn Huntleye". The gifts of clothing included, in October 1498, a black velvet gown trimmed with mink and Calabrian squirrel, and a black cloth gown trimmed with lettice and miniver; in March 1499 a tawny gown edged with black velvet, frontlets, and tippets; in April 1502, black and crimson velvet for gown and black kersey for stockings; and in November 1502, black satin, and other black cloth, to be trimmed with mink (from her own stock) and miniver, with a crimson bonnet.

On 25 January 1502, Catherine attended the ceremony of marriage between James IV and Margaret Tudor at Richmond Palace. James IV was represented by the Earl of Bothwell as his proxy. In February 1503, Lady Catherine was a mourner at the funeral of Elizabeth of York, arriving in a "chair", a carriage, with Lady Fitzwalter and Lady Mountjoy. Lady Catherine made the offerings at the masses and with 37 other ladies placed a pall, an embroidered cloth, on the coffin at Westminster Abbey.

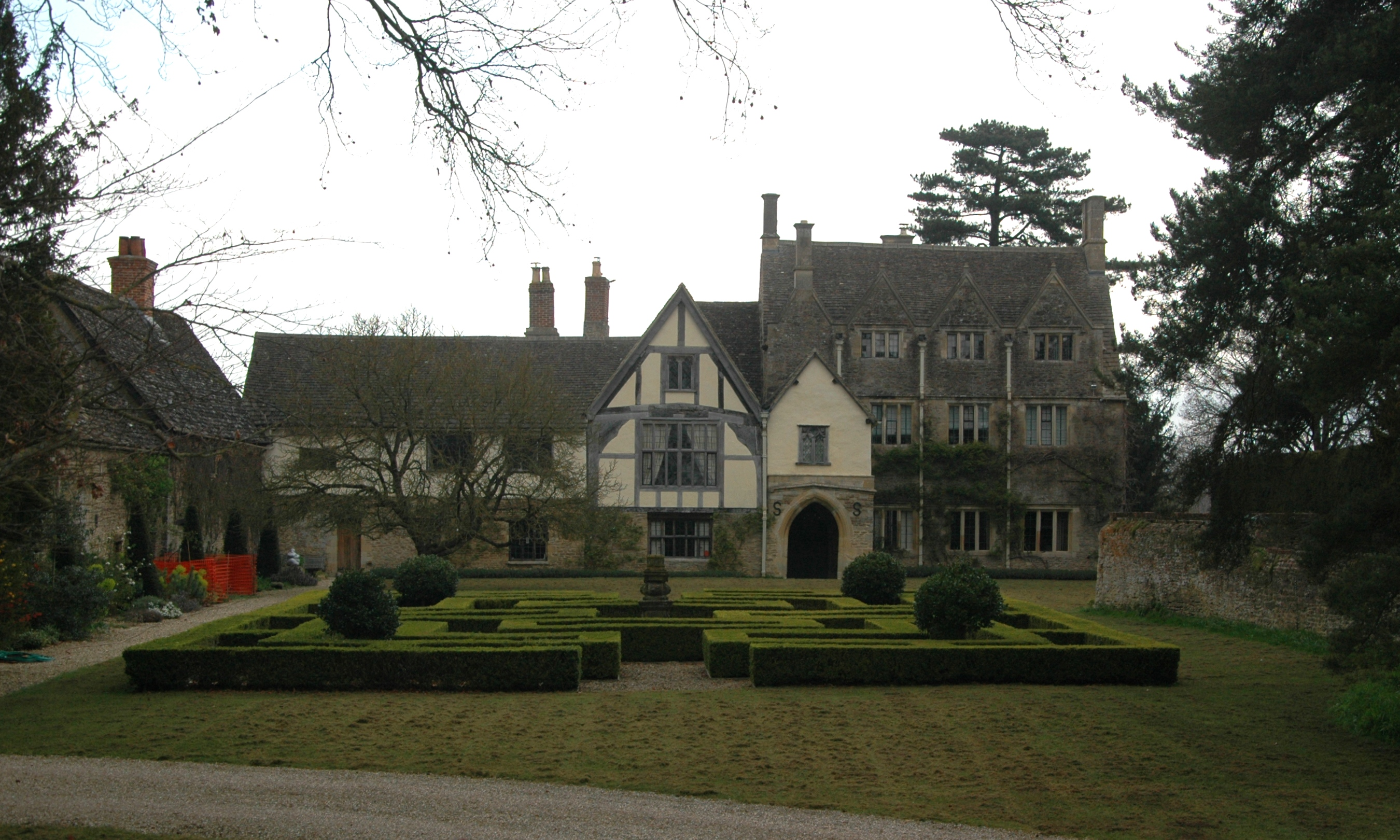
After 1512, Lady Catherine lived at Fyfield Manor, Oxfordshire

In 1510, Lady Catherine obtained letters of denization and that same year, on 8 August, was given the manors of Philberts at Bray, and Eaton at Appleton, both then in Berkshire. In 1512, Catherine acquired along with her second husband the manor of 'Fiffhede', Fyfield, and upon surrender of patent of 8 August the three manors were all re-granted to Lady Catherine Gordon with the proviso she could not leave England, for Scotland or other foreign lands, without licence.

== Scottish chronicles ==
A chronicle written by a Scottish monk Adam Abell briefly mentions Lady Catherine Gordon, calling her "Margaret". Abell records an unlikely rumour that when she remained at the English court it was thought she married Henry VII. According to John Lesley, in 1510 an imposter of the "White Rose" visited the Gordon family and James IV in Scotland.

== Subsequent marriages and death ==
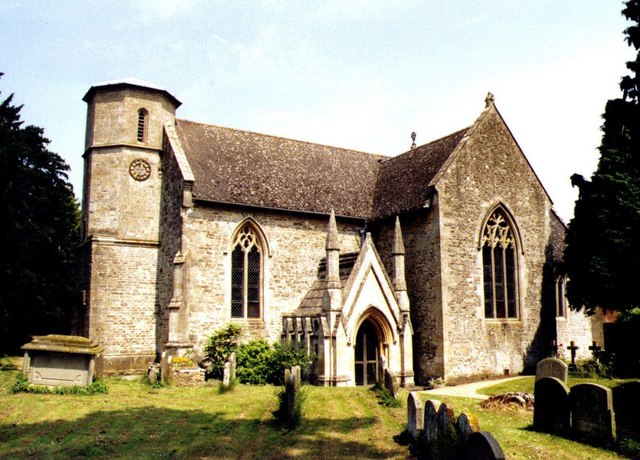
St Nicholas, Fyfield, is believed to be the resting place of Lady Catherine and her 4th husband, Christopher Ashton

Before 13 February 1512, she married James Strangeways of Fyfield, a gentleman usher of the King's Chamber. The couple endowed a chantry priest to sing for the souls of their parents at St Mary Overie at Southwark in London, where James Strangeways, James's father, was buried.

In 1517, she married her third husband, Matthew Craddock or Cradock of Swansea, Steward of Gower and Seneschal of Kenfig. Craddock worked as a lieutenant of Charles, Earl of Worcester, and was knighted in 1517, possibly in connection with his marriage. He owned a ship called the Mathue Cradok, which served in Henry VIII's wars against France. According to David Loades, Lady Catherine was head of Mary Tudor's Privy Chamber in 1525.

Matthew Craddock died in 1531. His will notes the jewels and silver which Lady Catherine owned before they were married. These included a pair of beads (a rosary) which had been converted from a girdle with a gold pomander, a heart of gold, another heart of gold with a fleur-de-lis of diamonds, and a gold cross with nine diamonds, and a great pomander of gold. There was a "flat chain for a paste", probably for wearing on a gable hood or French hood, a "paste" was worn at the front edge of a hood. A jewel with "Armgill" may have been a depiction of the Welsh Saint Armel who was revered by the Tudors. Craddock bequeathed his widow an income from the lands of Dinas Powys and Llanedeyrn near Cardiff.

Her fourth and last husband was Christopher Ashton of Fyfield. She is not recorded as having any surviving children; however, she acquired two stepchildren by Ashton's previous marriage. When not at court, Catherine resided at Fyfield Manor. During her marriage to Craddock she had obtained permission to live in Wales.

Catherine made her will on 12 October 1537, and died soon after. She was buried in the church of St Nicholas at Fyfield, with a monument including brass figures (now lost). Matthew Craddock had previously erected a chest monument for himself and "Mi Ladi Katerin" with their effigies in St Mary's Church, Swansea. The carved heraldry included emblems of the Gordon and Hay family. Both Catherine's mother and paternal grandmother were members of the Hay family.

== In Literature ==
Lady Catherine Gordon features prominently in Mary Shelley's historical romance, The Fortunes of Perkin Warbeck (1830). Her captivity is the subject of James Hogg's historical ballad, The White Rose o' Scotland, published in the Monthly Magazine in February 1834.

== On screen ==
She was played by Elizabeth MacLennan in The Shadow of the Tower and by Amy Manson on the Starz series The White Princess.
