= Perkin Warbeck =

15th-century pretender to the English throne

- Pretender
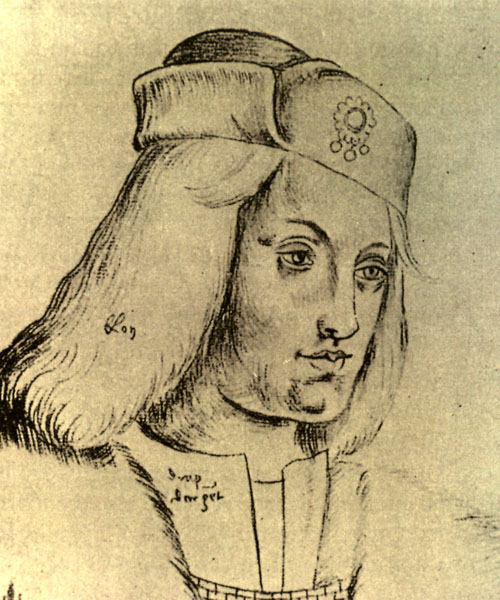
- 16th-century copy by Jacques Le Boucq of the only known contemporary portrait of Warbeck, Library of Arras
- Born: Pierrechon de Werbecque c. 1474; Tournai, Tournaisis
- Died: 23 November 1499 (aged 24–25); Tyburn, Middlesex, England
- Title(s): Pretended Duke of York
- Throne(s) claimed: England
- Pretend from: 1490
- Connection with: Claimed to be Richard of Shrewsbury, Duke of York, son of King Edward IV
- Royal House: In the name of the House of York
- Father: Jehan de Werbecque; claimed to be Edward IV of England
- Mother: Katherine de Faro; claimed to be Elizabeth Woodville
- Spouse: Lady Catherine Gordon

Perkin Warbeck (c. 1474 – 23 November 1499) was a pretender to the English throne claiming to be Richard of Shrewsbury, Duke of York, who was the second son of Edward IV and one of the so-called "Princes in the Tower". Richard, were he alive, would have been the rightful claimant to the throne, assuming that his elder brother Edward V was dead and that he was legitimate—a point that had been previously contested by his uncle, King Richard III.

Due to the uncertainty as to whether Richard had died (either of some natural cause or having been murdered in the Tower of London) or whether he had somehow survived, Warbeck's claim gained some support. Followers may have truly believed Warbeck was Richard or may have supported him simply because of their desire to overthrow the reigning king, Henry VII, and reclaim the throne. Given the lack of knowledge regarding Richard's fate, and having received support outside England, Warbeck emerged as a significant threat to the newly established Tudor dynasty; Henry declared Warbeck an impostor.

Warbeck made several landings in England backed by small armies but met strong resistance from the King's men and surrendered in Hampshire in 1497. After his capture, he retracted his claim, writing a confession in which he said he was actually Flemish and born in Tournai around 1474. He was executed on 23 November 1499. Dealing with Warbeck cost Henry VII over £13,000 (equivalent to £13,000,000 in 2025), putting a strain on Henry's weak state finances.

== Early life ==
Perkin Warbeck's personal history is fraught with many unreliable and varying statements. Warbeck said that he was Richard of Shrewsbury, Duke of York, the younger son of King Edward IV, who had disappeared mysteriously along with his brother Edward V after Richard, Duke of Gloucester, succeeded to the throne as King Richard III following the death of King Edward IV, his eldest brother, in 1483. After Warbeck was captured and interrogated in 1497 under the eye of King Henry VII, another version of his life was published, based on his confession. This confession is considered by many historians to be only partially true as it was procured under duress.

According to the confession, Warbeck was born to a woman called Katherine de Faro, wife of John Osbeck (also known as Jehan de Werbecque). Osbeck was Flemish and held the occupation of comptroller to the city of Tournai, in present-day Belgium. These family ties are backed up by several municipal archives of Tournai which mention most of the people whom Warbeck declared he was related to. Around the age of ten, he was taken to Antwerp by his mother to learn Dutch. From there, he was undertaken by several masters around Antwerp and Middelburg before being employed by a local English merchant named John Strewe for a few months, where he traded cloth.

After his time in the Netherlands, Warbeck yearned to visit other countries and was hired by a Breton merchant. This merchant eventually brought Warbeck to Cork, Ireland, in 1491 when he was about 17, and there he learned to speak English. Warbeck then claims that upon seeing him dressed in silk clothes, some of the citizens of Cork who were Yorkists demanded to do "him the honour as a member of the Royal House of York." He said they did this because they were resolved on gaining revenge on the King of England; they decided that he would claim to be the younger son of the late King Edward IV.

== Claim to the English throne ==
Warbeck first claimed the English throne at the court of Burgundy in 1490, where jeton coins were minted for him. Warbeck explained his (i.e. Richard of Shrewsbury's) mysterious disappearance by claiming that his brother Edward V had been murdered, but he had been spared by his brother's (unidentified) murderers because of his age and "innocence". However, he had been made to swear an oath not to reveal his true identity for "a certain number of years". He claimed that from 1483 to 1490, he had lived on the continent of Europe under the protection of Yorkist loyalists, but when his main guardian, Sir Edward Brampton, returned to England, he was left free. He then declared his true identity.

In 1491, Warbeck landed in Ireland in the hope of gaining support for his claim as Lambert Simnel had four years previously. His cause was promoted by John Atwater, a former Mayor of Cork and ardent Yorkist, who may have been instrumental in helping him assume the identity of Richard. However, little support materialised for an active rebellion, and Warbeck was forced to return to mainland Europe. There his fortunes improved. He was first received by Charles VIII of France, but in 1492 he was expelled under the terms of the Treaty of Étaples, by which Charles had agreed not to shelter rebels against Henry VII. After an English expedition laid siege to Boulogne, Charles VIII agreed to withdraw all backing from Warbeck. In the Duchy of Burgundy, however, Warbeck was publicly recognised as Richard of Shrewsbury by Margaret of York, widow of Charles the Bold, sister of Edward IV, and thus the aunt of the Princes in the Tower. Whether Margaret—who left England to marry before either of her nephews were born—truly believed that the pretender was her nephew Richard, or whether she considered him a fraud but supported him anyway, is unknown, but she tutored him in the ways of the Yorkist court.

Henry complained to Philip of Austria, Duke of Burgundy, about the harbouring of the pretender. When Henry was ignored, he imposed a trade embargo on Burgundy, cutting off important Burgundian trade connections with England. The pretender was also welcomed by various other monarchs and was known in international diplomacy as the Duke of York. At the invitation of Duke Philip's father, Emperor Maximilian I, in 1493, Perkin attended the funeral of Maximilian's father Frederick III and was recognised as King Richard IV of England.

== Support in England (Perkin Warbeck conspiracy) ==
Pro-Yorkist sympathy in England involved important figures making it known that they were prepared to back Warbeck's claims. These included Lord Fitzwater, Sir Simon Montfort, Sir Thomas Thwaites (ex-Chancellor of the Exchequer), Sir William Stanley (the Lord Chamberlain) and Sir Robert Clifford. Clifford went over to mainland Europe and wrote back to his friends to confirm Warbeck's real identity as Prince Richard.

King Henry ordered the group of supporters to be rounded up and put on trial. All were duly arrested, together with William D'Aubeney, Thomas Cressener, Thomas Astwode, Robert Ratcliff and others. Lord Fitzwater was sent as a prisoner to Calais and later beheaded for trying to bribe his gaolers.

In show trials in January 1495, all the conspirators were initially condemned to death, although six, including Thwaites, were then pardoned and their sentences commuted to imprisonment and fines. Within days Sir Simon Montfort, Robert Ratcliff and William D'Aubeney were beheaded at Tower Hill and Cressener and Astwode pardoned at the block. Later the same month Sir William Stanley was also beheaded. Other members of the group were imprisoned and fined. Sir Robert Clifford was pardoned and rewarded for revealing the names of the conspirators.

== First landing in England ==
On 3 July 1495, funded by Margaret of Burgundy, Warbeck landed at Deal, Kent, hoping for a show of popular support. They were confronted by locals loyal to Henry VII in the ensuing Battle of Deal. Warbeck's small army was routed and 150 of the pretender's troops were killed without Warbeck even disembarking. He was forced to retreat almost immediately, this time to Ireland. There he found support from Maurice FitzGerald, 9th Earl of Desmond, and laid siege to Waterford, but, meeting resistance, he fled to Scotland.

== Support in Scotland (1495–1496) ==
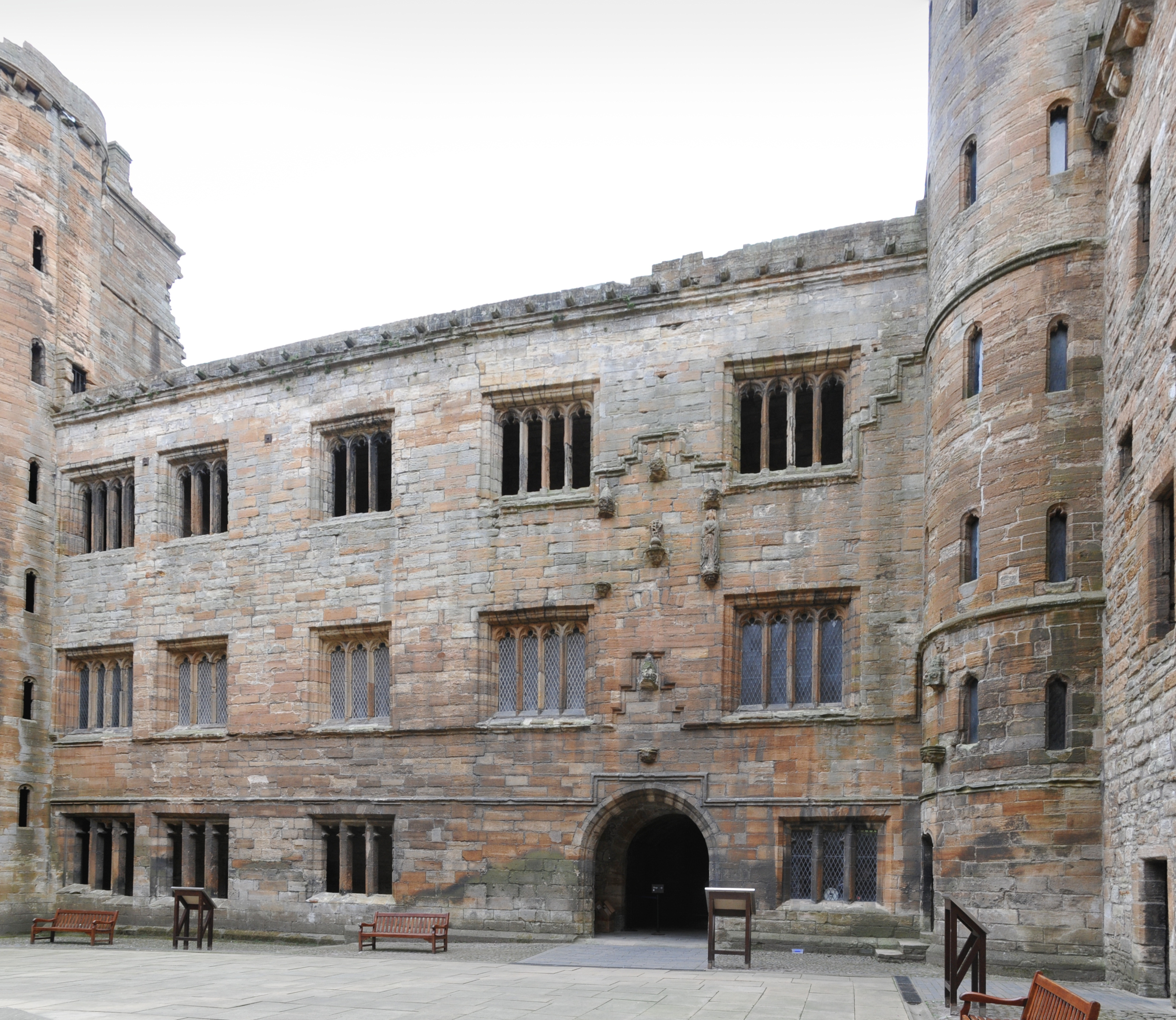
Perkin Warbeck spent Christmas 1495 at Linlithgow Palace in Scotland.

Warbeck was well received by King James IV. Warbeck followed the court. He came to Stirling Castle on 20 or 27 November 1495, was a Christmas guest at Linlithgow Palace, and spent time at Falkland Palace. James realised that Warbeck's presence gave him international leverage. As Ferdinand and Isabella of Spain were negotiating an alliance with Henry VII, James IV knew that Spain would help him in his struggles with England in order to prevent the situation escalating into war with France.

Spanish ambassadors arrived in Edinburgh, and later Pedro de Ayala was established as a resident ambassador during the crisis. Warbeck married Lady Catherine Gordon, a daughter of George Gordon, 2nd Earl of Huntly. The marriage was celebrated in Edinburgh with a tournament, possibly on 13 January, Saint Mungo's day. James and William Sinclair were competitors. James gave Warbeck clothes for the wedding and armour covered with purple silk.

Historian Katie Stevenson suggests the clothing bought for the tournament shows Warbeck fought in a team with the king and four knights. A copy of a love letter in Latin obtained by Pedro de Ayala is thought to be Warbeck's proposal to Lady Catherine. However, James's biographer Norman Macdougall comments that it is clear that nobody, with the possible exception of Margaret of Burgundy, took seriously his claim to be the prince; his marriage to a junior Scots noblewoman was scarcely what might be expected for a potential king of England.

In September 1496, James IV prepared to invade England with Warbeck. A red, gold and silver banner was made for Warbeck as the Duke of York; James's armour was gilded and painted, and the royal artillery was prepared. John Ramsay of Balmain (also called Lord Bothwell) described the events for Henry VII. He saw Roderic de Lalaing, a Flemish knight, arrive with two little ships and 60 German soldiers and meet James IV and talk to Warbeck. Guns provided for the raid from Edinburgh Castle included two great French "curtalds", 10 falconets or little serpentines, and 30 iron breech-loading "cart guns" with 16 close-carts or wagons for the munitions. Bothwell estimated the invasion force would last only four to five days in England before it ran out of provisions. He suggested, from the safety of Berwick-upon-Tweed, that the Scots could be vanquished by a modest English force attacking from north and south in a pincer movement.

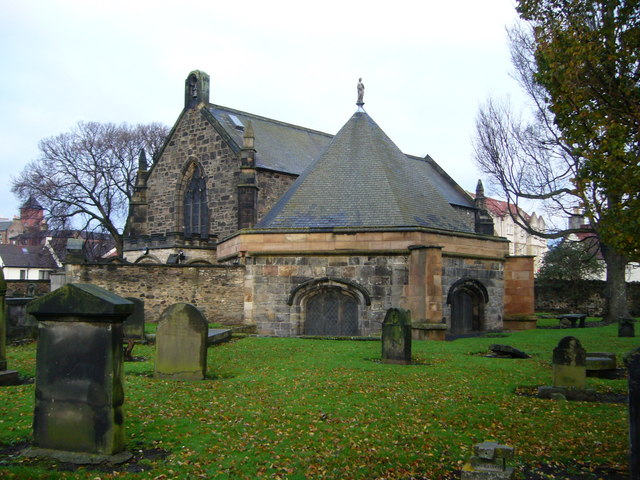
Perkin Warbeck and James IV prayed for victory at Restalrig

The Scottish host assembled near Edinburgh; James IV and Warbeck offered prayers at Holyrood Abbey on 14 September and on the next day at St Triduana's Chapel and Our Lady Kirk of Restalrig. On 19 September 1496 the Scottish army was at Ellem and on 21 September they crossed the Tweed at Coldstream. Miners set to work to demolish Heaton Castle on 24 September, but the army quickly retreated when resources were expended and hoped-for support for Perkin Warbeck in Northumberland failed to materialise. According to an English record, the Scots penetrated four miles into England with a royal banner displayed and destroyed three or four little towers (or Bastle houses). They left on 25 September 1496 when an English army commanded by Lord Neville approached from Newcastle. When news of this invasion reached Ludovico Sforza, Duke of Milan, on 21 October 1496, he wrote to his ambassador in Spain to request the Spanish monarchs make peace between England and Scotland. The peace mission was entrusted to the Spanish ambassador in Scotland, Pedro de Ayala, who had been Perkin's companion in Northumberland.

Later, wishing to be rid of Warbeck, James IV provided a ship called the Cuckoo and a hired crew under a Breton captain, Guy Foulcart. Horses were hired for 30 of Warbeck's companions to ride to the ship at Ayr on 5 July 1497. Pedro de Ayala accompanied Perkin to Ayr. Perkin pawned a horse for cash in Ayr and sailed to Waterford in shame. James IV made peace with England by signing the Treaty of Ayton at St Dionysius's Church in Ayton in Berwickshire. Once again Perkin attempted to lay siege to Waterford, but this time his effort lasted only eleven days before he was forced to flee Ireland, chased by four English ships. According to some sources, by this time he was left with only 120 men on two ships. Bacon's History of the Reign of King Henry VII said he had "in his company four small barks, with some sixscore or sevenscore fighting men".

== Landing in Cornwall ==
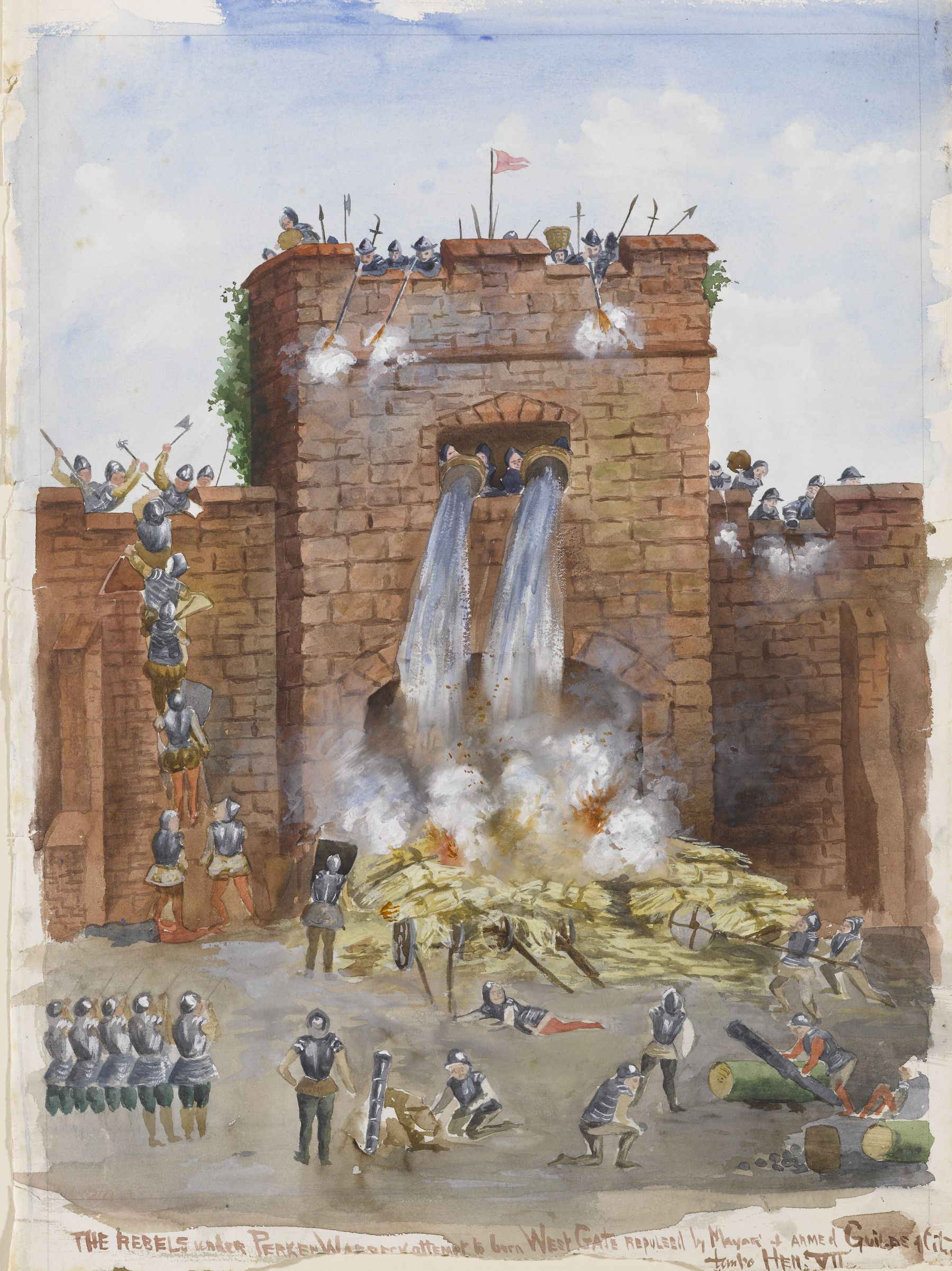
Painting of rebels under Perkin Warbeck as they attempt to burn Exeter's West gate by Mary Drew c1900 and 1920 in the Royal Albert Memorial Museum's fine art collection

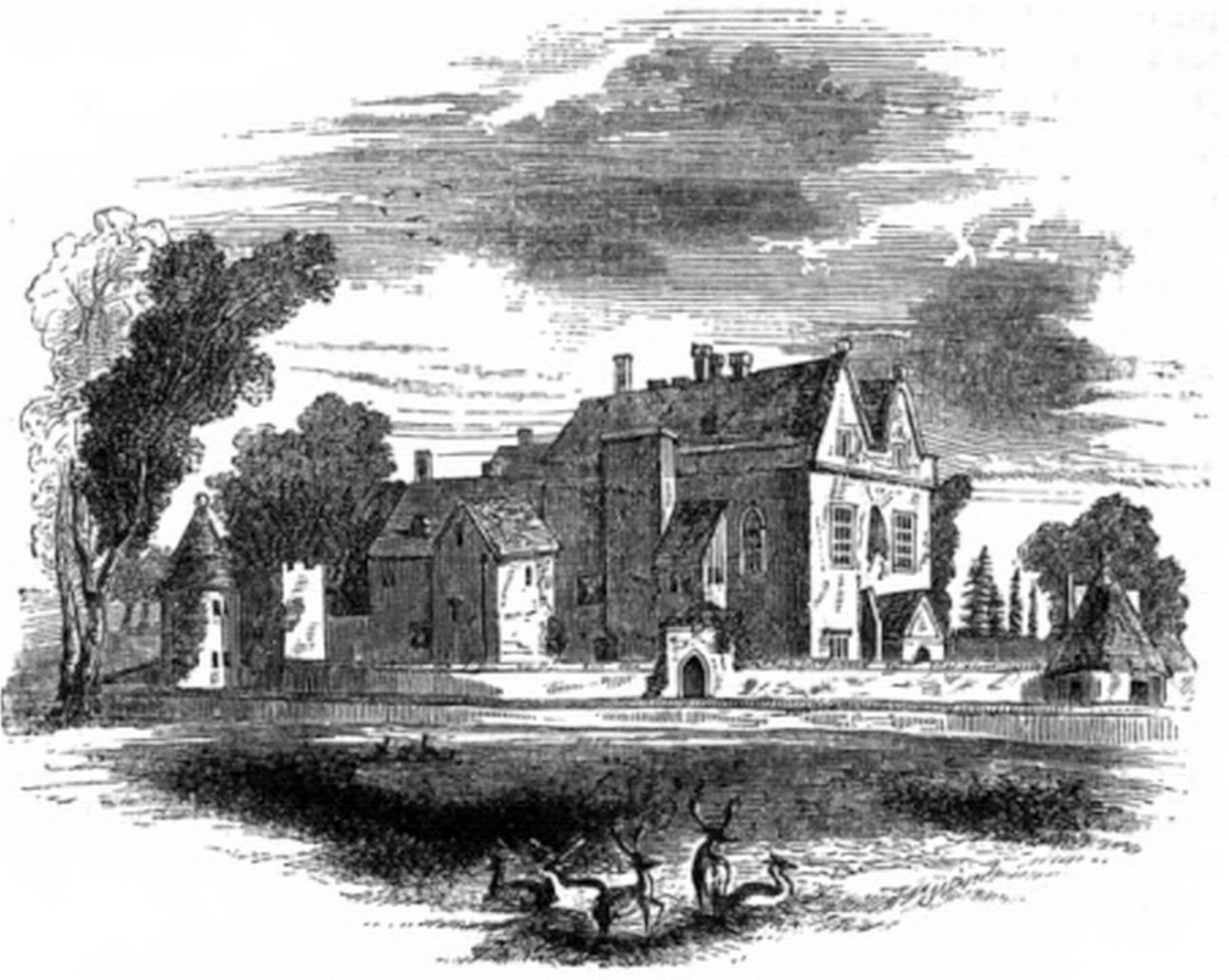
Beaulieu Abbey in Hampshire, where Warbeck took sanctuary

On 7 September 1497, Warbeck landed at Whitesand Bay, two miles north of Land's End, in Cornwall, hoping to capitalise on the Cornish people's resentment in the aftermath of their uprising only three months earlier. Warbeck proclaimed that he could put a stop to extortionate taxes levied to help fight a war against Scotland and was warmly welcomed. He was declared "Richard IV" on Bodmin Moor and his Cornish army some 6,000 strong entered Exeter before advancing on Taunton. Henry VII sent his chief general, Giles Daubeney, 1st Baron Daubeney, to attack the Cornish and when Warbeck heard that the King's scouts were at Glastonbury he panicked and deserted his army.

Warbeck was captured at Beaulieu Abbey in Hampshire where he surrendered. Henry VII reached Taunton on 4 October 1497, where he received the surrender of the remaining Cornish army. The ringleaders were executed and others fined. Warbeck was imprisoned, first at Taunton, then at the Tower of London, where he was "paraded through the streets on horseback amid much hooting and derision of the citizens".

== Imprisonment and death ==
Warbeck was initially treated well by Henry. As soon as he confessed to being an impostor, he was released from the Tower of London and was given accommodation at Henry's court. He was even allowed to be present at royal banquets. He was, however, kept under guard and was not allowed to sleep with his wife, who was living under the protection of the queen.

After eight months at court, Warbeck tried to escape; he was quickly recaptured. He was then held in the Tower, initially in solitary confinement, and later alongside the 17th Earl of Warwick; the two tried to escape in 1499. Captured once again, Warbeck was led from the Tower to Tyburn on 23 November 1499, where he read out a confession and was hanged. Warbeck had signed a paper confessing that his name was Piers Osbeck, a boatman's son from Tournai in France. It is unclear from where Henry VII got the name "Perkin Warbeck" or why it was maintained by Henry. Warbeck's Irish ally John Atwater was also executed at Tyburn on the same day. The Earl of Warwick was beheaded on Tower Hill on 28 November 1499.

Warbeck was buried in Austin Friars, London. The presumed site of his unmarked grave is at the Dutch Church, Austin Friars.

His story was featured in Francis Bacon's 1622 work History of the Reign of King Henry VII.

== Appearance ==
Perkin reportedly resembled Edward IV in appearance, which has led to speculation that he was Edward's illegitimate son or at least had some genuine connection with the York family. Francis Bacon believed he was one of Edward's many illegitimate children. It has also been suggested that he was a son of one of Edward's siblings, either Richard III or Margaret of York, Warbeck's first major sponsor.

Some authors, for example Horace Walpole, have even gone as far as to claim that Warbeck actually was Richard, Duke of York.

=== Portrait ===
It is often claimed that Perkin's only surviving likeness is a drawing in the Recueil d'Arras by Jacques le Boucq dating from c. 1570. The text labelling the drawing as Perkin Warbeck is in a different hand to inscriptions on other drawings in the collection. It might have been added later. It is then questionable if it indeed depicts Warbeck. Since le Boucq didn't know who the man was, by his time the identity of the man was likely forgotten. However, Le Boucq's original handwriting describes the materials of the man's outfit as "drap dor" (drap d'or=cloth of gold) and "drap darger" (probably drap d'argent=cloth of silver). An outfit fit for royalty, but not pointing to Warbeck specifically.

Within the Recueil d'Arras, the "Perkin Warbeck" drawing is placed among portraits of the Scottish and English royal family (James IV, Margaret Tudor, Henry VII and Elizabeth of York).

This group of drawings in the Recueil d'Arras may be based on the work of Meynnart Wewyck, an artist at the Tudor court who travelled to Scotland in the years after Perkin Warbeck had left. There he was known as "Mynours the English painter".

Importantly, Wewyck is said to have delivered 4 portraits of English royals to Scotland in 1502 but in Receuil only 3 are labelled as them. (Henry VII, Elizabeth of York and Margaret Tudor). The remaining painting depicted a young prince, the future Henry VIII. He might be the male mistakenly labelled as Warbeck.

Another painter, Piers, from Antwerp, was his successor at the Scottish court, and he has also been suggested as the source of the Scottish portraits in the Recueil.

== Warbeck in popular culture ==
Warbeck's story subsequently attracted writers, most notably the dramatist John Ford, who dramatised the story in his play Perkin Warbeck, first performed in the 1630s.

- Charles Macklin wrote a play featuring Warbeck, King Henry the VII, or The Popish Impostor, which was published in 1746.
- Friedrich Schiller wrote a plan and a few scenes for a play about Warbeck; he never finished the play because he gave priority to other works, such as Maria Stuart and Wilhelm Tell.
- Mary Shelley, best known as the author of Frankenstein, wrote a romance on the subject of Warbeck, The Fortunes of Perkin Warbeck, published in London in 1830.
- Lord Alfred Douglas wrote a poem about Perkin Warbeck in 1893 or 1894. It is included in the Collected Poems of Lord Alfred Douglas, published in 1928.
- In Dorothy L. Sayers's mystery novel Have His Carcase (1932), Lord Peter Wimsey discovers that the murderers lured the victim to his death by playing on his secret belief that he was the hereditary Tsar of Russia, based on his great-great-grandmother's purported morganatic marriage to Nicholas I. When Harriet Vane points out that even if this were true, the man would not be the next in line to the throne, Peter remarks that genealogy has a way of making people believe what they want to believe, saying he knows a "draper's assistant" in Leeds who earnestly believes he will be crowned King of England as soon as he can find the record of his ancestor's marriage to Perkin Warbeck; the fact that Warbeck's claim to the throne was ultimately invalidated, and that the Tudor dynasty he laid claim to has since been replaced by others, doesn't faze him in the least.
- The American comic book Archie #221 (1972) contains a 5-page skit entitled "Five Page Fooler" by author Frank Doyle and artist Harry Lucey, wherein iconic everyteen Archie Andrews encounters a rude, unpleasant boy who looks just like himself. The boy is referred to by other inhabitants of Riverdale as "Clarence," but calls himself Perkin Warbeck. No explanation for the mystery is given in the story, which instead focuses on slapstick comedy and metaphysical humour. The most recent reprint is in Archie Jumbo Comics Digest #350 (2024).
- The novel Crown of Roses (1989) by Valerie Anand suggests that Warbeck was the son of an illegitimate son of Richard Duke of York who had been sent to Burgundy as a boy to imply to interested parties that Richard of Shrewsbury had left the Tower alive.
- The historical novel The Tudor Rose (1953) by Margaret Campbell Barnes deals at length with the Warbeck plot and implies that Warbeck actually was Richard of Shrewsbury, Duke of York.
- Warbeck is the central character in Philip Lindsay's historical novel They Have Their Dreams.
- In 2005 Channel 4 and RDF Media produced a drama entitled Princes in the Tower about the interrogation of Warbeck, starring Mark Umbers. Warbeck almost convinces Henry VII that he really is Richard, Duke of York. Warbeck "remembers" that Henry's mother Margaret Beaufort poisoned his brother Edward V, after which Richard III spirited him away to safety. Warbeck succeeds in alienating King Henry from both his mother and his wife, Elizabeth of York, who now believe Warbeck to be her lost brother. Margaret then shows Warbeck two young men in chains, who she presents as the real princes, locked up for years in isolation and now completely insane. She says Henry knows nothing about them. She forces Warbeck to confess he is an imposter to save the life of his son by Lady Catherine Gordon. Warbeck confesses and is hanged. In the final scene, Margaret is seen overseeing the burial of a piece of regal clothing with two skeletons, while, in voice-over, Thomas More, whose secret account of the events is supposed to be the drama's source, describes how lucky he has been under Henry VIII.
- In the 1969 BBC TV movie Tower of London: The Innocent, Warbeck was portrayed by British actor Corin Redgrave.
- In the 1972 BBC television series The Shadow of the Tower, Warbeck was portrayed by British actor Richard Warwick.
- The American Shakespeare Center (ASC) in Staunton, Virginia, produced a comedy entitled The Brats of Clarence, written specifically for the ASC 'Blackfriars' stage by Paul Menzer. The play tracks the progress of Perkin Warbeck from the Scottish court to London to claim his birthright as heir to the throne.
- Warbeck and his wife are characters in the novel The Crimson Crown by Edith Layton (1990). The main character is Lucas Lovat, a spy in the Court of Henry VII, and a subplot of the novel is his indecision as to whether Warbeck is, or is not, Prince Richard.
- English comedians Stewart Lee and Richard Herring both make references to Warbeck and fellow pretender Lambert Simnel in much of their work, both as Lee and Herring and individually. Simnel and Warbeck's names have appeared sporadically throughout their material over the years.
- Warbeck's story is retold through the eyes of Grace Plantagenet in The King's Grace by Anne Easter Smith (2009). Grace, an illegitimate daughter of Edward IV, attempts to unravel the mystery surrounding the man who claims to be her half-brother Richard. Rosemary Hawley Jarman, in her novel "We Speak No Treason", also fictionalised unconfirmed speculation that Warbeck could have been another of Edward's illegitimate sons.
- In Philippa Gregory's 2009 novel The White Queen, the young Duke of York is sent into hiding by his mother, Elizabeth Woodville, while a changeling is sent to the Tower in his place. In the fifth novel of Gregory's The Cousins' War series, The White Princess, a mysterious pretender appears, claiming to be Richard. King Henry Tudor invents an elaborate false history to justify denial of the pretender's claims, giving him the name Perkin Warbeck (among others). Although the novel never answers the question, Gregory states in the epilogue that she believes Warbeck's claim was genuine.
- A miniseries The White Princess, adapted from Gregory's novel, was first aired on Starz in 2017 where Perkin Warbeck was played by Irish actor Patrick Gibson. Unlike Gregory's original work, the series portrays Warbeck as the genuine Duke of York, who has escaped England and been raised by a Flemish boatmaker.
- A latter section of Terence Morgan's novel The Master of Bruges expands on the theory that Prince Richard escaped to Flanders, grew up in Tournai and returned to England as Perkin Warbeck.
- Four-part audio drama "The Pretender" on History Hit
- The Wetherspoons pub on East Street in Taunton is called The Perkin Warbeck.

== See also ==
- John Deydras – who claimed to be the true Edward II
- Mary Baynton – who claimed to be Princess Mary Tudor

Titles in pretence
Preceded by Lambert Simnel	— TITULAR — King of England; Lord of Ireland; Yorkist claimant 1490–1499	Succeeded by Edmund de la Pole
