= Guy Foulcart =

Guy Foulcart, was a sea captain from Brittany employed by James IV of Scotland.

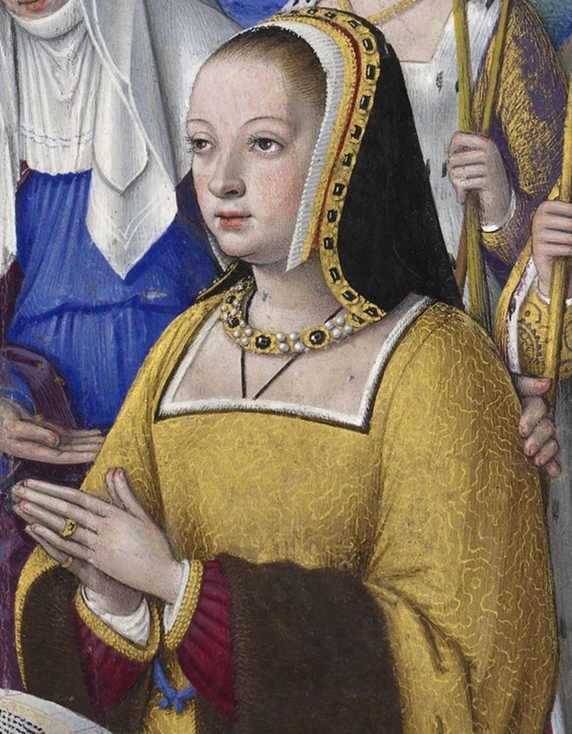
Anne of Brittany helped Foulcart with his compensation claim

In July 1497 James IV hired Foulcart to transport Perkin Warbeck, known as the "Duke of York", and his wife Catherine Gordon from Scotland. Their ship was the Cuckoo, which James IV had acquired from Foulcart in October 1496 on his return from the Raid of Ellem. The Spanish ambassador Pedro de Ayala rode with Perkin to Ayr and his 30 men on hired horses. Lady Catherine Gordon was dressed in a "sea gown" of tanny Rouen cloth and a black cloak.

James IV gave money to Perkin's servant Rowland Robinson for provisions for the Cuckoo. A Brittany merchant John Peidzoun helped equip the ship and supplied wine. He was rewarded with an exemption from customs.

This did not have a good outcome for Foulcart, and some years later Anne of Brittany wrote from Blois to James IV on his behalf. Foulcart had complained about his imprisonment and the loss of his goods after transporting Perkin Warbeck. He had to pay a ransom and legal fees, which he owed to his business partner, Guillaume Pomptome.

James IV replied to this letter, saying that Foulcart had freely accepted the commission, but had obtained letters to state he was acting under the king's instructions. This was according to the usual mutual customs of hiring sailors and ships. He suggested that Foulcart had not pursued compensation in Scotland because his case was weak. It was recorded in June 1503 that the Breton captain had refused justice.
