= The Woeful Lamentation of Jane Shore =

Song

The Woeful Lamentation of Jane Shore is an English broadside ballad from the 17th century. It tells the story of Jane Shore, a mistress of King Edward IV, and her downfall after the death of Edward. Copies of the broadside can be found at the British Library, the University of Glasgow Library, and Magdalene College, Cambridge.

== Synopsis ==
The ballad is broken up into two parts. In the first part, Jane Shore laments her downfall after the death of King Edward IV. Jane tells us that her parents forced her to marry young against her will to a man named Matthew Shore. She had a "wanton mind" and spend her life "lewdly," living on Lombard Street, where she showed off her beauty. Eventually, her name made it to the royal court and she caught the eye of King Edward IV, who fell in love with her. Through lust and pride, and in part because of the encouragement of her friend and neighbor, Mrs. Blague, she "defiled her bed" with the King and became his concubine. She reaps the rewards of the courtly life, including a good living and the ability to command Edward at will, while her husband grieves and eventually leaves England to spend the rest of his life as a sailor.

When Edward dies, and after a very brief succession by his 12-year-old son, Edward V, his brother, Richard III, becomes king and turns against the friends of Edward, including Jane Shore. He forces her to do public penance in Lombard Street, where thousands of people see her dressed in a sheet. He takes all of her clothes and money and vows that nobody will be able to help her. She turns to Mrs. Blague for help, but Mrs. Blague refuses to give her back her diamonds, and throws her out. When a man she had helped out once offers her food, Richard sentences him to death. She becomes a beggar and dies naked in a ditch by the side of the road. She warns other maidens not to become like her.

The second part of the ballad is told from the standpoint of Matthew Shore, who tells Jane that she has brought him to disgrace. He cries every day for being cuckolded, and finally leaves for Flanders, France, Spain, and Turkey. He goes to a fortune teller and looks in a crystal ball, where he sees Jane embracing Edward, and then sees her dead, naked in the street. He finally goes back to England, where he is sentenced to death for "clipping gold."

== Cultural and Historical Significance ==
Francis James Child says that this ballad "adheres to matter of fact with a fidelity very uncommon," citing the description of Jane Shore from Michael Drayton's notes following a letter from Shore to King Edward included in his England's Historical Epistles (1597). In these notes, Drayton describes Shore as follows: "Her stature was meane, her haire of a dark yellow, her face round and full, her eye gray, delicate harmony being betwixt each part's proportion, and each proportion's colour, her body fat, white, and smooth, her countenance cheerfull and like to her condition."

Richard Helgerson argues that the ballad drew on the version of the story as told by Thomas Heywood, where Jane's "tears have become nourishment for London audiences." According to Helgerson, Jane's story is popular with audiences because the everyday domestic world that they belong to is elevated to the status of tragedy.

=== Other Versions of the Jane Shore Story ===
- Sir Thomas More's The History of King Richard III (c. 1513), is often cited as an important character study of Jane Shore.
- Thomas Churchyard published a poem in The Mirour For Magistrates (1563) called "How Shore's Wife, King Edward the Fourth's Concubine, was by King Richard Despoiled of all her Goods and Forced to do Open Penance."
- Anthony Chute's 1593 poem, "Beauty Dishonored, Written Under the Title of Shore's Wife," tells the story from the perspective of Jane's ghost.
- Mowbray Velte cites the anonymous play, The True Tragedie of Richard III (c. 1595) as a possible influence on both the Heywood play and Shakespeare's Richard III
- Jane Shore is a main character in Thomas Heywood's play, Edward IV (c. 1600).
- In 1603, Philip Henslowe paid Henry Chettle and John Day to produce another play on Jane Shore. This play no longer exists.
- Nicholas Rowe wrote a biography of Jane Shore, The Life and Character of Jane Shore, which he drew primarily from the works of Sir Thomas More, who personally knew her.
- The story of Jane Shore was later re-written by S. King, as The Unfortunate Concubine
- A British silent film called Jane Shore was directed by Bert Haldane and Floyd Martin Thornton (1915). Blanche Forsythe played Jane Shore. The film was based on Rowe's play.
- Florence Barker played Jane in Frank Powell's Jane Shore (1911).
- A short film by Edwin J. Collins called Jane Shore starred Sybil Thorndike as Jane (1922).
- Jean Plaidy's romantic novel, The Goldsmith's Wife (1950), is about Jane Shore.
- She is played by Anne Carroll in Jane Howell's 1983 TV movie version of Richard III.
- Figures in Silk by Vanora Bennett (2008) is about Jane Shore and features her sister as well.
- She is a character in Philippa Gregory's The White Queen (2009), under her real name, Elizabeth.
- She is the main character in Mistress to the Crown by Isolde Martin (2013).
- She is the main character in Royal Mistress by Anne Easter Smith (2013).
