= Siege of Waterford (1495) =

Siege of Waterford 1495

Date	23 July – 3 August 1495 (1 week and 4 days)
Location	Waterford
Result	City defended

Belligerents
Perkin Warbeck; Maurice FitzGerald	City of Waterford
- First recorded use of cannons at in Reginald's Tower

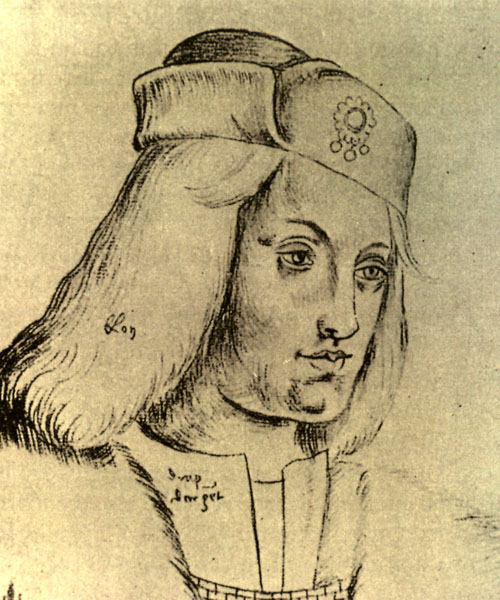
16th-century copy by Jacques Le Boucq portrait of Perkin Warbeck

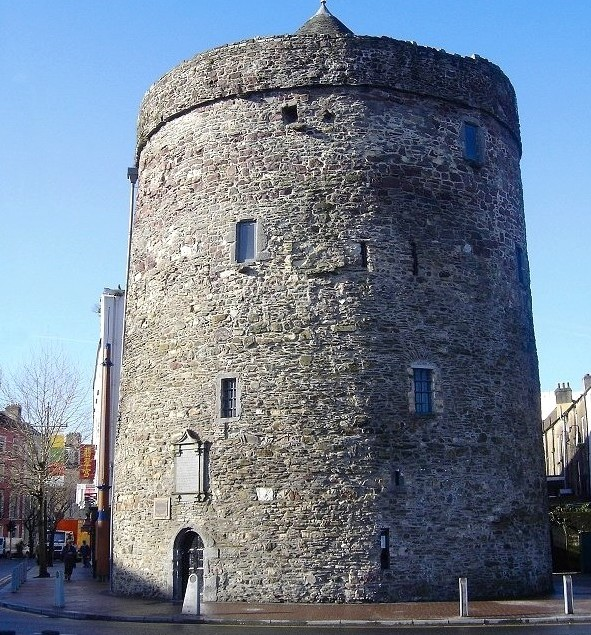
Guns, placed at Reginald's Tower, were used by the city's defenders.

An eleven-day siege of Waterford took place, in Waterford in 1495, after the pretender to the throne of Henry VII, Perkin Warbeck's failed attack on Deal, Kent. Warbeck was joined by Cork's Maurice FitzGerald, 9th Earl of Desmond when they went to Ireland and launched an invasion of Waterford on 23 July 1495.

Supported by "foreign mercenaries", Warbeck's force besieged the city; however, its walls were well-defended and the marshes to the east of the city were flooded by the damming of St. John's River. Attacks towards the city were repulsed and were followed by counterattacks into the besiegers' camp. These counterattacks resulted in the capture of several prisoners who were dragged into the city and beheaded. The defenders also had cannons on the walls of the city in Reginald's Tower that were used to fire on the attacking ships. These cannons succeed in sinking two of the eleven ships they faced. The battle ended on the eleventh day of the siege and was a loss for Warbeck's force. Warbeck himself escaped following the failed siege, while his supporter, Maurice FitzGerald, was "forgiven" by the crown for his role in the attack.

In the years following victory, the town's motto was granted by Henry VII as Urbs Intaca Manet Waterfordia ('the city of Waterford remains untaken'). This battle contains the earliest recorded use of cannons in Irish history.

== See also ==
- History of Waterford
