= John Atwater =

15th-century Irish politician

John Atwater (died 23 November 1499) was an Irish merchant and Mayor of Cork known for his support of Perkin Warbeck, a pretender to the English Crown following the Wars of the Roses. Atwater was a prominent Yorkist supporter opposed to the rule of the Tudor Dynasty led by Henry VII.

After Warbeck's arrival in Cork in 1491, Atwater was instrumental in persuading him to impersonate Richard, Duke of York. Richard probably died in the Tower of London several years earlier, but there remained widespread support for his family in Ireland. His impersonator enjoyed great success for several years and travelled across Europe securing recognition from various monarchs. Atwater may have participated in Warbeck's unsuccessful Siege of Waterford in 1495.

In 1496, Atwater was excluded from a general pardon of Warbeck's supporters issued by the new Lord Deputy of Ireland, the Earl of Kildare. He accompanied Warbeck on his invasion of England in 1497, which ended in defeat. Captured by Tudor forces, he was held in the Tower of London. In 1499, he was tried for treason at Whitehall and sentenced to be hanged, drawn and quartered. On 23 November, he was taken along with Warbeck to Tyburn and executed.

== Bibliography ==
- John Duncan Mackie. The Earlier Tudors, 1485–1558. Clarendon Press, 1952.
