= History of the Reign of King Henry VII =

1622 book

- Cambridge University Press republished edition (1994)
- Editor: Brian Vickers
- Author: Francis Bacon
- Language: English
- Genre: History; Biography
- Publisher: Cambridge University Press (UK)
- Publication date: 1622 (original publication by Bacon); 1994 (Vickers' Cambridge 1st edition)
- Publication place: England
- Media type: Print (hardback & paperback)
- Pages: 336 (Cambridge University Press 1st edition)
- ISBN: 978-0521586634

History of the Reign of King Henry VII is a 1622 work by the English writer Francis Bacon. It charts the reign of the first Tudor monarch Henry VII who took the throne from his rival Richard III in 1485. At the time of writing Bacon had recently fallen from political power. He completed the work in late 1621 and sent a copy to James I. It was published the following year.

The book remains his only completed work of history. At the request of Charles, Prince of Wales he began work on a follow-up account of the reign of Henry VIII, but only completed a brief introduction.

Bacon's portrayal of Henry was extremely influential for the following three centuries. Modern historians, however, take a more skeptical approach of the biography due to perceived methodological flaws and biased characterizations of the figures of Henry’s day.

== Background ==
Francis Bacon's History of the Reign of King Henry VII was published in November 1621 during the reign of James I. Francis Bacon was an English historian and philosopher who was enjoyed a rich political career as Lord Chancellor. In 1621, Bacon suffered a public and political fall from grace resulting in political exile during the reign of King James I and was confined within the Tower of London for a few days. Much of Bacon's work focused on British empiricism, scientific enquiry, philosophy, and history. History was written during Bacon's exile from James I's royal court and is a well-known example of the type of historical writing commonly employed in the Tudor-Stuart period of history.

English Professor David M. Bergeron of the University of Kansas states Bacon's History has been understood as his "desire to flatter King James and […] regain some favour that he had lost" while also demonstrating that like Henry VII's accomplishment of uniting "warring houses", James I had united "the kingdoms of England and Scotland". This conclusive and widely agreed upon assessment of History's purpose is derived from Bacon’s foreword for the book:

"It may please your Highness,

In part of my acknowledgment to your Highness, I have endeavoured to do honour to the memory of the last King of England that was ancestor to the King your father and yourself; and was that King to whom both Unions may in a sort refer: that of the Roses being in him consummate, and that of the Kingdoms by him begun. Besides, his times deserve it. For he [Henry VII] was a wise man, and an excellent King; and yet times were rough, and full of mutations and rare accidents. And it is with times as it is with ways. Some are more up-hill and down-hill, some are more flat and plain; and the one is better for the liver, and the other for writer. I have not flattered him, but took him to life as well as I could, sitting so far off, and having no better light. It is true, your Highness hath a living pattern, incomparable, of the King your father. But it is not amiss for you also to see one of these ancient pieces. God preserve your Highness.

Your Highness’s most humble and devoted servant,

Francis St. Alban."

Bacon's aim was to deconstruct and explore the policies and reign of Henry VII, establish a powerful and monarchical ancestral lineage between Henry VII and James I and have History used as an instructive manual for the royal court "which would contribute to the happiness and well-being of mankind". This was significant at the time for two reasons:

1. Bacon was suffering political exile so writing this ensured he was able to maintain a positive relationship with James I.

2. This book reflects the tradition of the Jacobean era writing that used history to legitimise the Tudor claim to the throne of England.

== Summary/content ==
History was written by Bacon to account for Henry VII's personal, political, and social life. The book is chronologically ordered, beginning with the death of Richard III against Henry's army in 1485 at the Battle of Bosworth. Bacon recounts Henry's marriage, his coronation and the coronation of his wife, Elizabeth of York, and unpacks scenes of war, treaties and political relationships between Henry and other monarchs within Europe in the fifteenth century. History also explores the foreign and domestic policies of Henry and at regular intervals, Bacon dedicates a section to deconstruct the laws passed by Henry's parliament. The book ends with Bacon's analysis of Henry VII's character, something historians argue was explicitly done to salvage Bacon's relationship with James I after his political scandal. Bacon divided History into forty sections, with each section title following the chronology of Henry's time as monarch and briefly providing the reader with either the place, purpose and/or event that the section will explore. The sections are as follows:

1. The Defeat of Richard III: Bosworth, 22 August 1485
2. The Coronation and First Parliament
3. The King’s Marriage to Elizabeth of York, 18 January 1486
4. Lambert Simnel’s Imposture
5. Coronation of the Queen, 25 November 1487
6. Foreign Affairs: Brittany and France 1489-90
7. Parliament and Lawgiving, 1488-9
8. Rebellion in Flanders, 1488-9
9. War with France, 1491
10. Spanish Conquest of Granada, 1492
11. Peace of Etaples, November 1492
12. Perkin Warbeck’s Imposture as Richard Duke of York, 1491-1499
13. Attempts at a Settlement of Ireland, 1494
14. Perkin Warbeck in Kent, 1495
15. Henry’s League with Italian States against France, 1495
16. Parliament and Lawgiving, 1495
17. Perkin Warbeck in Scotland, 1495
18. Perkin’s Proclamation, November 1495
19. The Anglo-Flemish Treaty, February 1496
20. The Cornish Rebellion, 1497
21. An Embassy from Spain; Peace-moves with Scotland
22. Perkin Warbeck’s Cornish Invasion
23. Sebastian Cabot Discovers Newfoundland, 1497
24. Disputes on the Scottish Border
25. Perkin Warbeck: The Last Act
26. King Henry in France, 1499
27. Death of Cardinal Morton, 1500
28. Jubilee at Rome, 1500; Pope Alexander’s Promised Crusade, 1501
29. Marriage between Catherine of Aragon and Prince Arthur, 14 November 1501
30. Marriage between James IV of Scotland and Margaret Tudor
31. King Henry’s Fiscal Policies; Empson and Dudley
32. Treachery of Edmund, Earl of Suffolk
33. Parliament and Lawgiving, 1504
34. The Death of Queen Isabella, 1504
35. King Henry’s Marital Plans
36. Meeting of Henry and Philip of Castile at Windsor, 1506
37. Anglo-Burgundian Treaty, 1506
38. King Henry’s Marital Plans, and Final Illness
39. Marriage Treaty between Mary Tudor and Charles Castile, 1508
40. King Henry’s Character

== Style/methodology ==
The History of the Reign of King Henry VII is the only completed book of Bacon and is classified as a historical biography. The methodology employed by Bacon in his research and writing of History was new for the historical period of the Renaissance that he was writing in as Bacon was the first to bring together "history and scientific philosophy", thereby making him an “important figure in the development of British empiricism” and “the earliest prominent methodologist of scientific enquiry". Bacon's role as a historian during the Renaissance meant that he encountered the birth of modern historiography, leading to his own theoretical deconstructions of historical writing and analysis. Bacon differentiated between civil history and natural history, with the first type being identified as “a form of knowledge, capable of instructing the mind” and second type being useful for "'informing the intellect' by drawing in part upon the liberal sciences". History is identified as a work of civil history in accordance with Bacon's definitions.

== Reception ==
Following the publication of History, Bacon’s biographical recount of the reign of Henry VII remained popular until the twentieth century. Initially, Bacon’s work was viewed as an exemplary case of historical writing as History is the only completed work of Bacon’s that showcases his scientific approach to the study of British history. Historians attribute the success and popularity of History for three centuries to Bacon’s context which saw the emergence of Renaissance historiography. Up until the seventeenth century, history was simply recounted and often existed as a form of entertainment and general discussion. With the birth of Renaissance historiography, historians’ methodology and aim when researching and writing about Britain’s history shifted from “the medieval chronicling mentality” to “relating cause and effect, on showing the interplay between personal disposition and public policy". The significant ideological and literary shift during the time that History was written in combination with Bacon’s personal belief “that the utility of history consisted in providing the material means to extend this empire”, are believed to be the reasons as to why History of the Reign of King Henry VII remained one of the most popular portrayals of Henry VII for three centuries. However, the twentieth century saw modern historians deconstruct Bacon’s methods, sources and objectivity when writing History, which began the long-standing debate as to whether Bacon’s historical recount of Henry VII holds any historiographical value for modern society’s study of Henry’s reign.

Fussner writes “Bacon contributed to the advancement of history by telling historians what and how they ought to write, not by writing a scientific history", which encapsulates modern historians’ approach to History of the Reign of King Henry VII. One of the first issues raised is the authenticity of History due to Bacon’s limited access to legal, historical, and personal documents from the reign of King Henry VII. Given that Bacon wrote History over a five-month period during his exile, questions have been raised regarding how, where and when Bacon would have been able to access authentic historical records, legal documents, and personal correspondence of Henry VII. This is supported by Woolf’s research which explains that when writing History, “he [Bacon] was exiled from London and its record repositories, particularly those in the Tower of London and in the huge library of the great manuscript collector, Sir Robert Cotton”. Issues have also been raised regarding the proper use and citation of sources, which when examined by Wilhelm Busch in the nineteenth century, revealed that while “Bacon made use of the Rolls of Parliament and a few other records, [he]…did not always reproduce their contents accurately". Historical records show Bacon getting help acquiring sources for History from two individuals: Sir John Borough and John Selden, and this presents a problem for historians as there is evidence of Bacon relying on passed-on information about sources from Borough and Selden to construct his version of Henry VII. This primarily led to Bacon using “original sources to illustrate or enrich his narrative, but he would not take the trouble to use them systematically to verify the accuracy of statements of fact”. Therefore, due to issues regarding access to authentic sources of evidence and Bacon’s inability to personally view documents that were not at the risk of being tampered with – due to being passed on via letters – the current reception of History is one that questions the validity of the book’s sources.

Furthermore, the short amount of time in which Bacon researched, wrote, and published History has raised significant concerns amongst modern historians. While Bacon’s aim for writing a recount of Henry VII was to have History used as a source of guidance for future monarchs, the invitation and acceptance of James I’s edits of History and Bacon’s foreword for History indicates the ulterior motive of maintaining a positive relationship with James I. Although maintaining a positive relationship with James I is not regarded by historians to be incriminating evidence against the authenticity of History, Bacon does consistently insist on similarities between James I and King Henry VII, particularly about their respective marriages. Current deconstruction of History's portrayal of Henry VII illustrates "that Bacon's assessment of Henry’s relationship to Elizabeth derives not from any sixteenth-century source but from Bacon’s observation of James’s treatment of Queen Anne". This presents a problem for modern historiography as it detracts from Bacon’s claim of scientific approach to history and the writing of history. As a result, the validity and reliability of History as a historical source on the rule, policies and character of King Henry VII is questioned.

== Bibliography ==
- Bergeron, D. M. (1992). Francis Bacon's Henry VII: Commentary on King James I. Albion: A Quarterly Journal Concerned with British Studies, 24(1), 17–26. https://doi.org/10.2307/4051240
- Cajori, F. (1925). The Baconian Method of Scientific Research. The Scientific Monthly, 20(1), 85–91.
- Chrimes, S.B. (1972). Henry VII. University of California Press.
- Fussner, F. S. (1962). 10. Sir Francis Bacon and the Idea of History. In The Historical Revolution (pp. 253–274). Columbia University Press.
- Fussner, F. S. (1962). The Historical Revolution: English Historical Writing and Thought 1580–1640. Columbia University Press. https://doi.org/doi:10.7312/fuss93578
- Introduction. (1998). In B. Vickers & F. Bacon (Eds.), Bacon: The History of the Reign of King Henry VII and Selected Works (pp. xi-xxxv). Cambridge University Press. https://doi.org/DOI: 10.1017/CBO9781139171212.002
- Peltonen, M. (Ed.). (1996). The Cambridge Companion to Bacon. Cambridge University Press.
- Principal events in Bacon's life. (1998). In B. Vickers & F. Bacon (Eds.), Bacon: The History of the Reign of King Henry VII and Selected Works (pp. xxxvi-xxxviii). Cambridge University Press. https://doi.org/DOI: 10.1017/CBO9781139171212.003
- Seldon, J., Bacon, F., & Woolf, D. R. (1984). John Seldon, John Borough and Francis Bacon's "History of Henry VII", 1621. Huntington Library Quarterly, 47(1), 47–53. https://doi.org/10.2307/3817533
- The History of the Reign of King Henry VII. (1998). In B. Vickers & F. Bacon (Eds.), Bacon: The History of the Reign of King Henry VII and Selected Works (pp. 1–206). Cambridge University Press. https://doi.org/DOI: 10.1017/CBO9781139171212.005
- Urbach, P. M. (2022, April 5, 2022). Francis Bacon: British Author, Philosopher, and Statesman Britannica Retrieved 19 April from https://www.britannica.com/science/Baconian-method
