= John Ramsay, 1st Lord Bothwell =

Scottish peer and courtier

John Ramsay, 1st Lord Bothwell (c. 1464 – 9 September 1513), also known as Sir John Ramsay of Trarinzeane, was a Scottish peer and courtier.

== Career ==
He was the son of John Ramsay of Corstoun in Fife (kin to the Ramsays of Carnock otherwise Pitcruvie) and Janet Napier presumed to be of the Merchiston Napiers. Janet Napier later married John Wilson a Burgess of Edinburgh (Parliamentary records of 1484).

John Ramsay was married to Isabel Cant in 1484. He then married Janet Kennedy, daughter of John Kennedy, 2nd Lord Kennedy, and Lady Elizabeth Seton, c. 6 November 1505. Janet Kennedy was a favourite mistress of King James IV of Scotland and this may have been a marriage of political convenience. He and Janet Kennedy were divorced. He then married Isobel Livingston, before February 1507/8.

He was attached to the court of King James III of Scotland and was resented by the traditional aristocrats. The principal charge against the King was his reliance on "low-born favourites", and Ramsay was clearly regarded as one of these. In parliament on 24 February 1484, the king bestowed the barony of Bothwell on him. In July 1482 he escaped execution by the King's opponents at Lauder Bridge by leaping on the King's horse, the only one of the King's favourites to survive. According to another version, he clung to the King and pleaded for his life: the King persuaded the lords to spare him on account of his extreme youth (he may still have been only 18). He sat in Parliament in 1485 and 1487 as Lord Bothwell. He upset the aristocrats by obtaining a royal mandate that he alone could carry arms within the precincts of the royal residence, probably acting as a royal bodyguard in his role as Master of the Household. He was an Esquire of the King's Chamber, an auditor of the Exchequer in 1484, and a Commissioner for letting the Crown lands. He was Ambassador to England in 1485 and 1486. His reputation declined further after the death of Queen Margaret, whom he was accused of poisoning, although there is no evidence at all to support the charge.

On 8 October 1488, after the death of James III at the battle of Sauchieburn, John Ramsay lost his title. He remained in England, acting as a spy for Henry VII of England, and took payment to deliver the Scottish King James IV to Henry.

Under James IV he was allowed to return to Scotland in 1496, and in September wrote letters from Berwick upon Tweed advising Henry VII how he might defeat the planned invasion of Northumbria by James IV and Perkin Warbeck. His first letter describes a visit to St Andrews where he presented Henry VII's gift of a crossbow to the king's brother James Stewart, Duke of Ross. People from Carlisle and Northumbria were visiting Perkin Warbeck. Another letter describes plans for a Scottish army to come to Ellem Kirk, on behalf of the "feigned boy" Perkin. James IV was willing to put himself in jeopardy for the pretender. Bothwell also describes the arrival of the Flemish knight Roderick de lalaing, and the artillery in Edinburgh castle.

He was rehabilitated on 8 April 1497 under the Great Seal, although not restored to his peerage or all of his former titles. He had liferent grants of the lands of Tealing and Polgavie in Fife, Trarinzeane near Cumnock in Ayrshire and half the lands of Kirkandrews in Wigtownshire. He took the title of Sir John Ramsay of Trarinzeane. On 13 May 1498 he had a charter of a tenement in the Cowgate, Edinburgh and another of lands in Forrester's Wynd on 6 November 1500.

In 1503 he was Captain of Linlithgow Palace. He negotiated the marriage of James IV to the daughter of Henry VII, thereby laying the cornerstone of the United Kingdom.

On 13 May 1510, he had a grant from the King pro bono servitio et ex special favore of the lands and barony of Balmain in Kincardineshire, erected into a free barony for him and his successors.

He died on 9 September 1513 at Flodden Field, killed in action.

His son William born around 1510 was entrusted to the Bishop of Dunblane, James Chisholm, uterine brother of Sir John Ramsay. William was the ancestor of the Ramsays of Balmain.

Peerage of Scotland
| New creation | Lord Bothwell; 1485–1488 | Forfeit |
