= Maurice FitzGerald, 9th Earl of Desmond =

Irish noble

Maurice FitzGerald
- Earl of Desmond
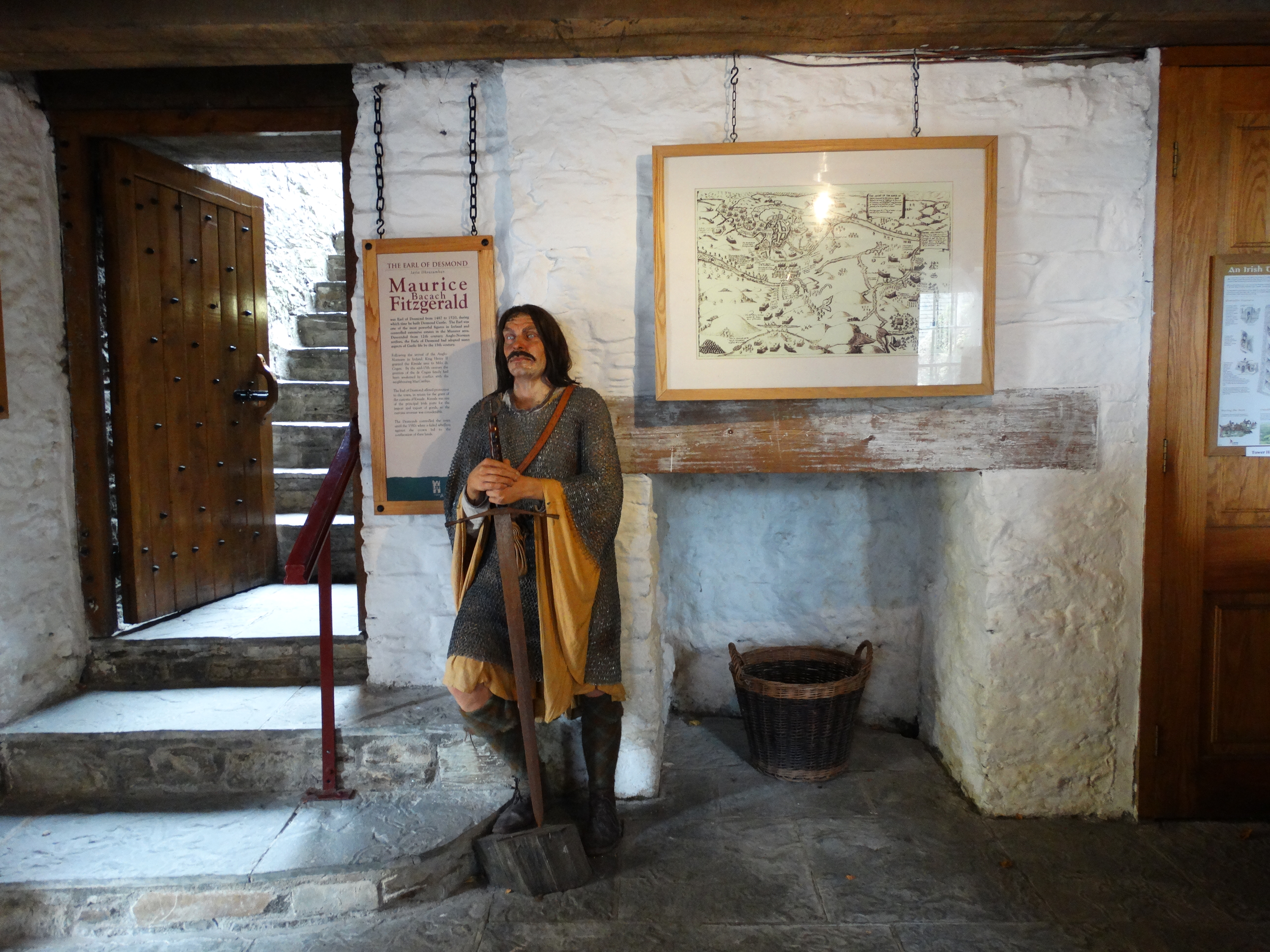
- Statue of Maurice Fitzgerald inside Desmond Castle, Kinsale
- Tenure: 1487–1520
- Predecessor: Thomas FitzJames FitzGerald
- Successor: James FitzMaurice FitzGerald
- Other names: Vehiculus, Bellicosus
- Died: 1520
- Buried: Tralee
- Spouses: Ellen Roche; Honora Fitzgibbon
- Issue: Thomas FitzMaurice FitzGerald; James FitzMaurice FitzGerald; Joan FitzGerald; Ellis FitzGerald
- Parents: Thomas FitzJames FitzGerald; Ellice de Barry

Maurice FitzGerald, 9th Earl of Desmond (died 1520) was the brother of James FitzGerald, 8th Earl of Desmond.

== Life ==
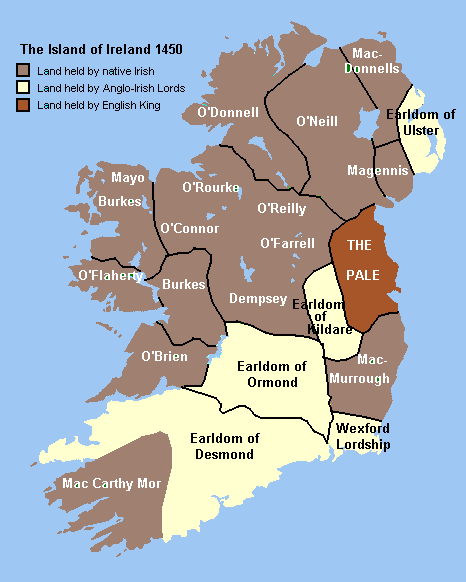
Ireland in 1450, showing the Earldom of Desmond, the Pale, and the territories of MacCarthy Mor

Upon the murder of James FitzThomas FitzGerald, the 8th Earl of Desmond, in 1487, his brother Maurice, called Baccagh, or The Lame, became the 9th Earl of Desmond. The murderer, John Murtagh was apprehended and put to death. In 1489 a plague ravaged the country, followed by a famine in 1497, and many died.

According to Alfred Webb: "Being lame, and usually carried in a horse-litter, he was styled 'Vehiculus,' and by some, on account of his bravery, 'Bellicosus.'"

In 1495, Maurice FitzThomas FitzGerald supported the pretender, Perkin Warbeck, in the Siege of Waterford and other expeditions. Nevertheless, making a humble submission, King Henry VII not only forgave, but took him into favour, 26 August 1497, and granted him all the 'customs, pockets, poundage, and prize-wines of Limerick, Cork, Kingsale, Baltimore, and Youghall, with other privileges and advantages.'

About the year 1500, Maurice FitzGerald rebuilt Desmond Castle, a three-story tower house in the town of Kinsale, to serve as a Customs House for wine and gunpowder.

"The condition of the inhabitants within the Pale at this period is thus described by a contemporary writer: 'What with the extortion of coyne and lyverye dayly, and wyth the wrongful exaction of osteing money, and of carryage and cartage dayly, and what with the Kinge's great subsydye yerely, and with the said trybute, and blak-rent to the Kinge's Iryshe enymyes, and other infynyt extortions, and dayly exactions, all the Englyshe folke of the countys of Dublyn, Kyldare, Meathe, and Uryell ben more oppressyd with than any other folke of this land, Englyshe or Iryshe, and of worsse condition be they athysside than in the marcheis.' O'Daly thus writes of Earl Maurice: 'This man was subsequently far famed for his martial exploits. He augmented his power and possessions — for all his sympathies were English — and a furious scourge was he to the Irish, who never ceased to rebel against the crown of England. The bitterest enemy of the Geraldines he made his prisoner, to wit, MacCarthy Mor, Lord of Muskerry; and now having passed thirty years opulent, powerful, and dreaded, he died [1520] to the sorrow of his friends and the exultation of his enemies.' He was buried at Tralee. His first wife was daughter of Lord Fermoy; his second, daughter of the White Knight."

== Marriage and issue ==
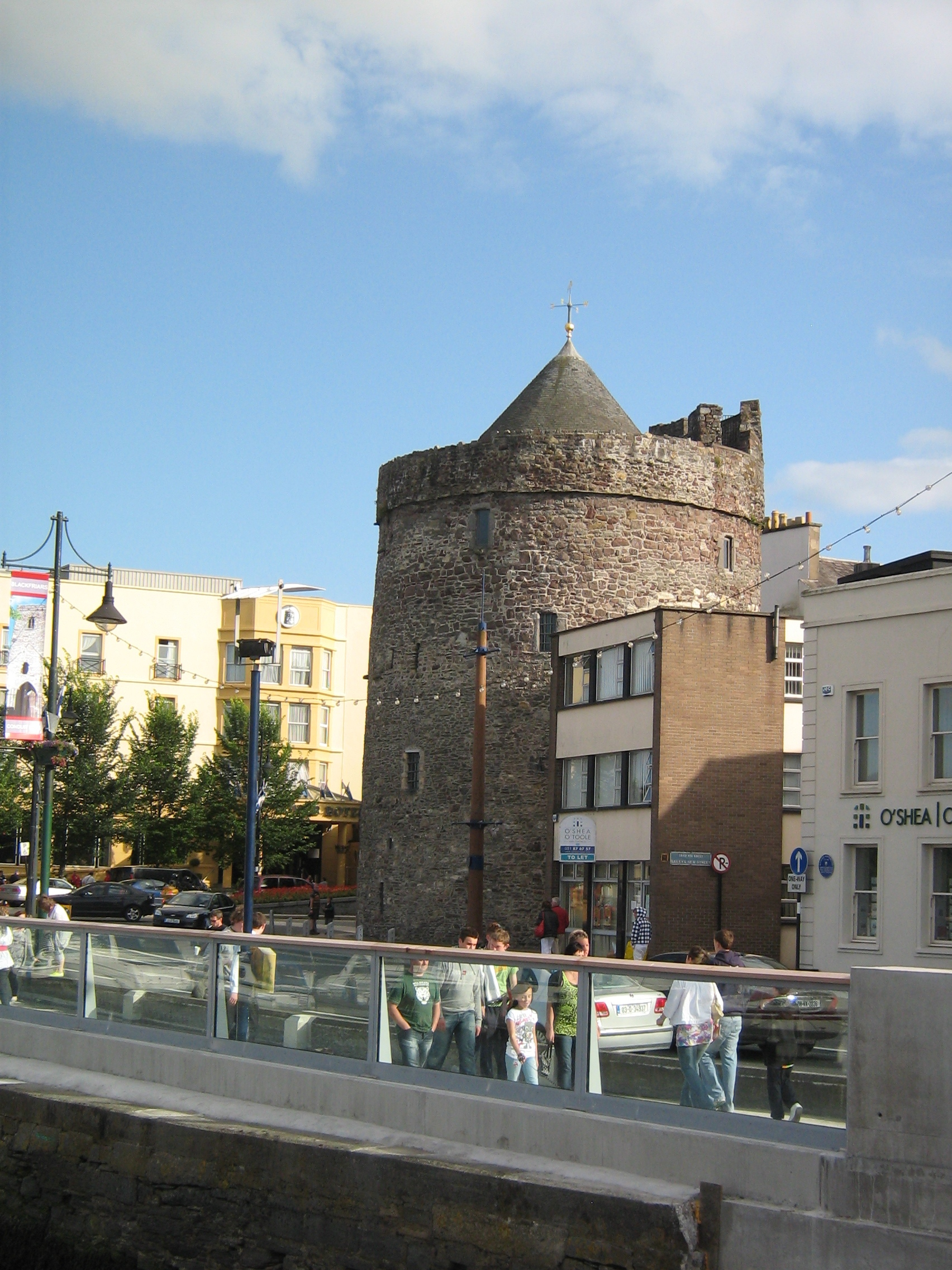
The cannons of Reginald's Tower helped repel the forces of Perkin Warbeck and Maurice FitzGerald from Waterford in 1495.

Maurice first married Ellen, daughter of Maurice Roche, 2nd Lord of Fermoy (distantly related to the Barons Fermoy), and his wife Lady Joan FitzGerald, daughter of James FitzGerald, 8th Earl of Desmond, and had issue:

1. Thomas FitzMaurice, who predeceased his father, leaving behind one daughter
2. James FitzGerald, 10th Earl of Desmond
3. Joan, who married Cormac Óg MacCarthy
4. Ellis, who married Connor O'Brien, King of Thomond

Maurice's second wife was Honora, daughter of the White Knight.

Ancestors of Maurice FitzGerald, 9th Earl of Desmond

Maurice FitzGerald, 1st Earl of Desmond
Gerald FitzGerald, 3rd Earl of Desmond
Aveline fitz Nicholas
James FitzGerald, 6th Earl of Desmond
James Butler, 2nd Earl of Ormond
Eleanor Butler
Elizabeth Darcy
Thomas FitzGerald, 7th Earl of Desmond
Mary de Burgh
Maurice FitzGerald, 9th Earl of Desmond
William Barry, 8th Baron Barry
Ellice de Barry
Ellen de la Roche

Peerage of Ireland
Preceded by James FitzThomas FitzGerald	Earl of Desmond; 1487–1520	Succeeded by James FitzMaurice FitzGerald
