= Richard of Shrewsbury, Duke of York =

English prince (born 1473)

Richard of Shrewsbury
- Duke of York; Duke of Norfolk; Earl of Nottingham
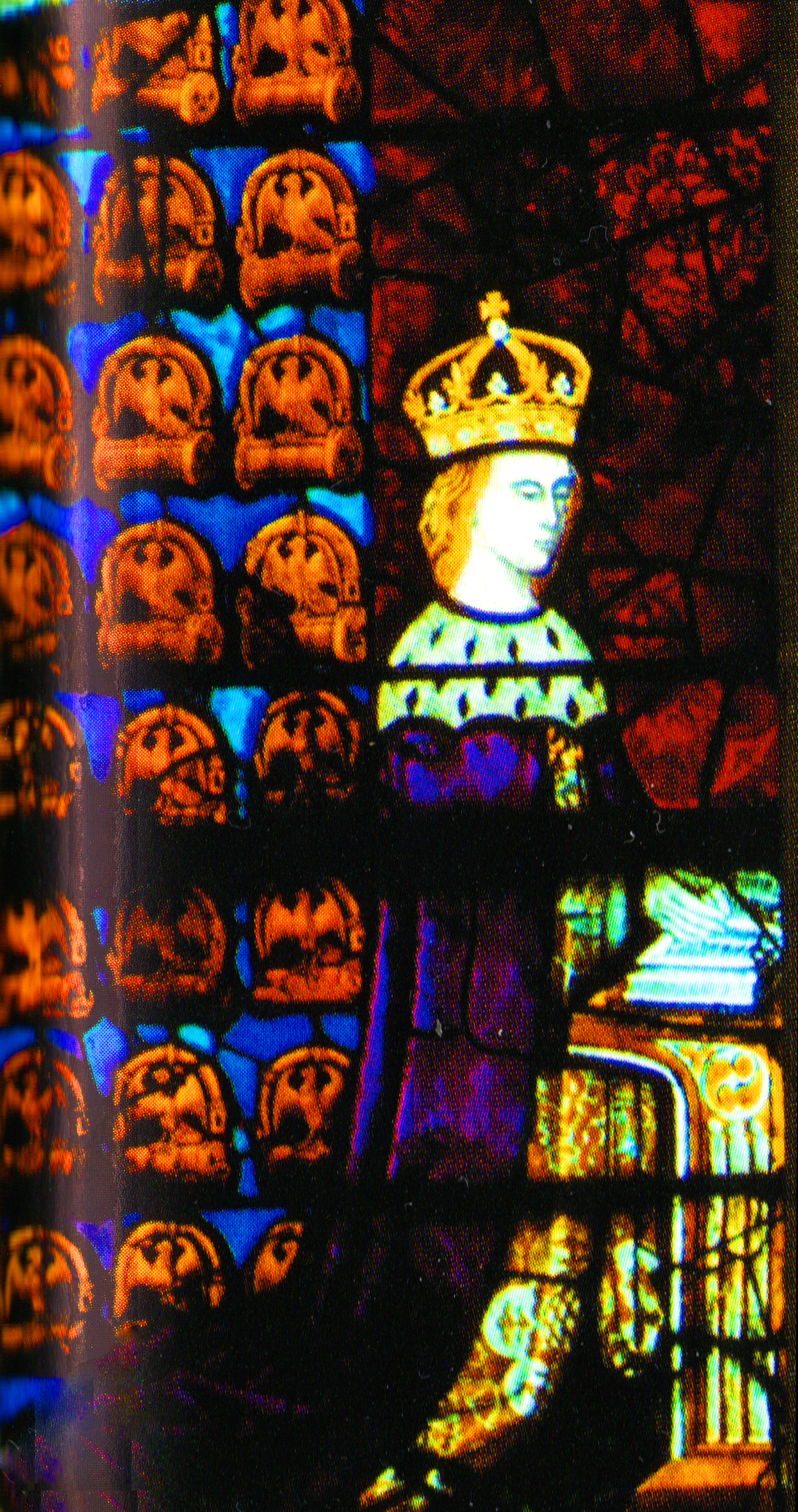
- Richard in stained glass, 1482–83, Burrell Collection
- Born: 17 August 1473; Shrewsbury, Shropshire, England
- Disappeared: July 1483 (aged 9); Tower of London, England
- Spouse: Anne de Mowbray, 8th Countess of Norfolk (m. 1478; died 1481)
- House: York
- Father: Edward IV of England
- Mother: Elizabeth Woodville

Richard of Shrewsbury, Duke of York (17 August 1473 – disappeared July 1483) was the second son of King Edward IV of England and Elizabeth Woodville. Richard and his older brother, King Edward V, mysteriously disappeared shortly after their uncle Richard III became king in 1483.

== Early life ==
Richard was born at the Dominican Friary in Shrewsbury on 17 August 1473, the sixth child and second son of reigning King of England Edward IV and his wife Elizabeth Woodville.

Prince Richard was created Duke of York on 28 May 1474 and was knighted on 18 April 1475. From this time on, it became a tradition for the second son of the English sovereign to be Duke of York. He was made a Knight of the Garter in May 1475.

=== Marriage to Anne de Mowbray ===
In January 1476, John de Mowbray, 4th Duke of Norfolk, Earl of Nottingham and Warenne, died leaving his infant daughter Anne as his sole heiress. Anne was quickly marked out as a bride for Richard. In anticipation of the marriage, Richard was created Earl of Nottingham on 12 June 1476, and was also given the titles of Duke of Norfolk and earl Warenne on 7 February 1477.

A papal dispensation for the marriage was obtained on 12 May 1477 because the children were too young to contract a valid marriage. Additionally they were "related in the third and fourth degrees of kindred". According to Medieval canon law, the minimum age for marriage was 14 for boys and 12 for girls, but it was not unknown for aristocratic children to be married much younger for political reasons. On 15 January 1478, in St Stephen's Chapel, Westminster, 4-year-old Richard married the 5-year-old (Note: Anne de Mowbray was born on 10 December 1472.) Anne.

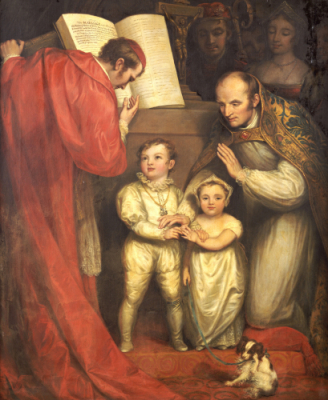
Depiction of Richard and Anne's marriage, by James Northcote

Anne de Mowbray died in Greenwich on 19 November 1481. Her estates should have passed to William, Viscount Berkeley and to John, Lord Howard, the co-heirs of the last duke's great-aunts. However Edward IV was not willing to relinquish the wealthy Mowbray estates, and so in January 1483, Parliament passed an act that gave the Mowbray estates to Richard for his lifetime (and at his death to his heirs if he had any). The rights of the two co-heirs at law were extinguished; Viscount Berkeley had financial difficulties and King Edward IV paid off and forgave those debts. Berkeley then renounced his claims to the Mowbray estate before parliament in 1483. Nothing was done for Lord Howard.

== Heir presumptive ==
Richard's father, King Edward IV, died on 9 April 1483. Thus Richard's elder brother Edward, Prince of Wales, became King of England and was acclaimed as such, and Richard his heir presumptive. Fearing for her family's safety, the Queen Dowager arrived with her family to Westminster Abbey seeking sanctuary in April 1483. Her eldest son was taken by his regent, Richard, Duke of Gloucester, to the Tower of London, allegedly to prepare for his coronation.

On 19 May 1483, Edward V was lodged in the Tower. In June 1483, the Duke of Gloucester requested that Richard join his brother in the Tower and Queen Elizabeth was forced to hand over the young boy. Richard entered the Tower on 16 June.

A priest, now generally believed to have been Robert Stillington, the Bishop of Bath and Wells, testified that Edward IV had agreed to marry Lady Eleanor Talbot in 1461. Lady Eleanor was still alive when Edward married Elizabeth Woodville in 1464 and the Regency Council under the late King's brother Richard, Duke of Gloucester, concluded that this was a case of bigamy. This invalidated the second marriage to Elizabeth Woodville and the legitimacy of all children of their union. Titulus Regius declared both Edward and Richard as illegitimate and removed from the line of succession on 25 June 1483. The Duke of Gloucester, as the only surviving brother of Edward IV, became King Richard III.

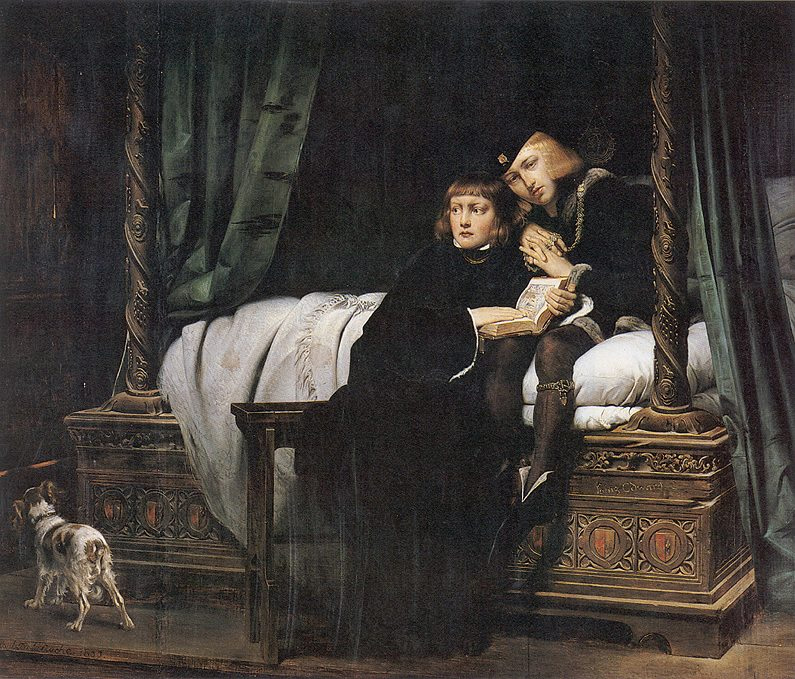
The Children of Edward (1830) by Paul Delaroche

== Possible fate ==
The Duke of York was sent to the Tower of London, then a royal residence, by King Richard III in mid-1483, where he was held with his brother. They were sometimes seen in the garden of the Tower, but the princes disappeared from sight after the summer of 1483, and their ultimate fates remain unknown. In 1486, Richard's eldest sister Elizabeth married Henry VII, thereby uniting the Houses of York and Lancaster.

=== Murder ===
By autumn 1483 it was widely-believed that the princes had been murdered. Tudor History was quick to blame their uncle Richard. Richard III has remained a key suspect, though other culprits including Henry Stafford, 2nd Duke of Buckingham, and Henry VII have been suggested. Thomas More wrote that the princes were smothered to death with their pillows, and his account forms the basis of William Shakespeare's play Richard III, in which Tyrrell suborns Forrest and Dighton to murder the princes on Richard's orders. Historian D. E. Rhodes stated that the boys were both murdered, probably in August. Alison Weir states that archaeological evidence indicates that the boys died in September. Subsequent re-evaluations of Richard III have questioned his guilt, beginning with William Cornwallis early in the 17th century.

=== Illness ===
In the period before the boys' disappearance, Edward was regularly being visited by a doctor; historian David Baldwin extrapolates that contemporaries may have believed Edward had died either of an illness or as the result of attempts to cure him. He notes however that there is no indication Richard was also receiving medical treatment.

=== Discovery of remains ===
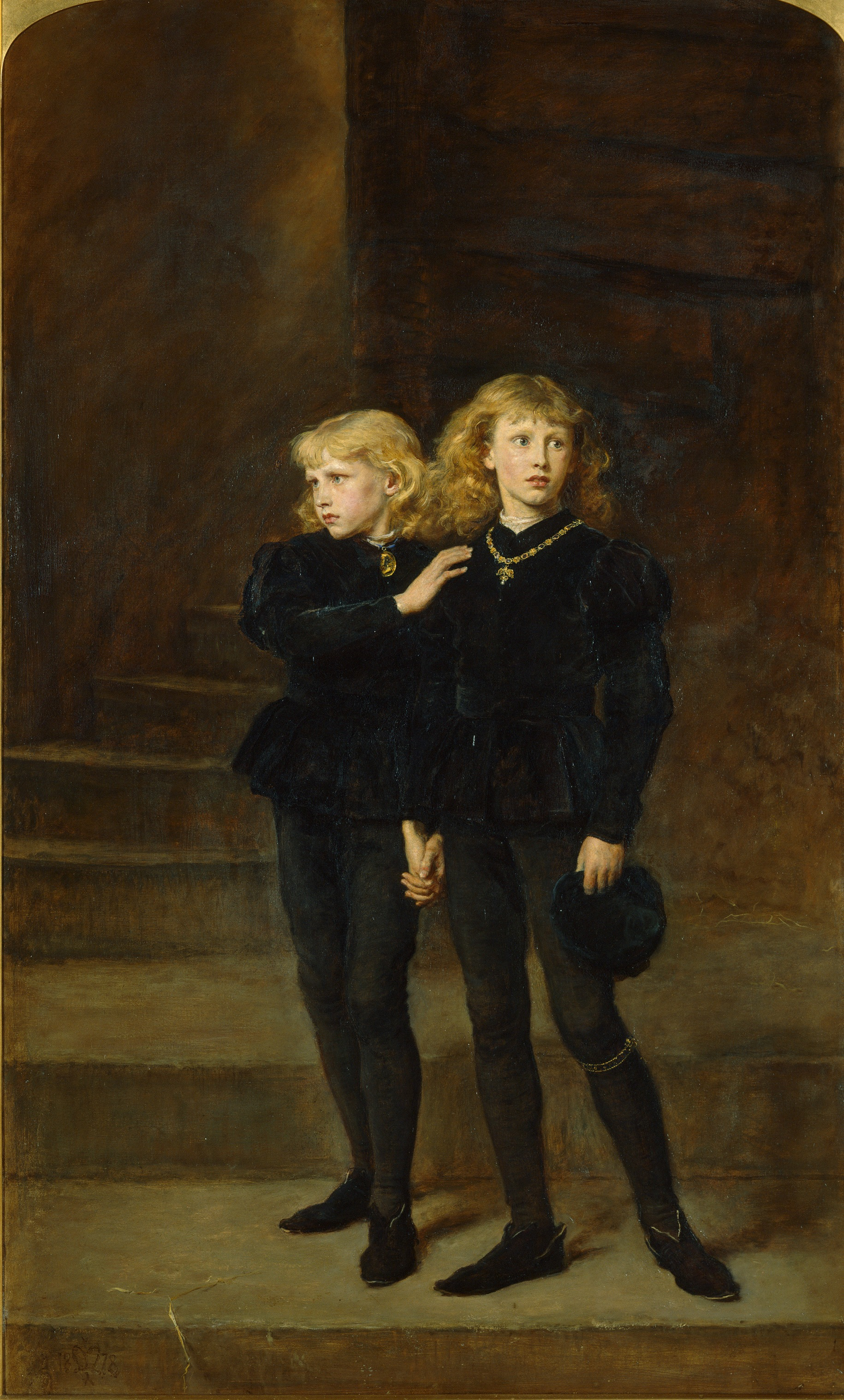
The Two Princes Edward and Richard in the Tower, 1483 (1878) by John Everett Millais

In 1674, bones reportedly belonging to two children were discovered by workmen rebuilding a stairway in the Tower. Four years later, on the orders of the reigning king Charles II, these were subsequently placed in Westminster Abbey, in an urn bearing the names of Edward and Richard. The bones were re-examined in 1933 in light of medical advances. It was discovered the skeletons were incomplete and had been interred with animal bones. It was determined that the incomplete skeletons were of two slender children: the first aged 12 to 13, and the second aged 9 to 11. According to Lawrence E. Tanner and W. Wright (the physicians who carried out the examination), "the evidence that the bones in the urn are those of the Princes is as conclusive as could be desired". Further examinations from 1955 to 1987 have mostly substantiated Tanner and Wright's claims, though the age of the bones has remained impossible to determine. Paul Murray Kendall, author of the revisionist biography Richard III, notes that historian Wilton M. Krogman of the University of Pennsylvania stated that "the skeletons inurned in Westminster Abbey cannot be flatly and incontrovertibly identified as those of the sons of Edward IV".

In 1789, workmen carrying out repairs in St George's Chapel, Windsor, rediscovered and accidentally broke into the vault of Edward IV and Elizabeth Woodville. Adjoining this was another vault, which was found to contain the coffins of two children. This tomb was inscribed with the names of two of Edward IV's children: George, Duke of Bedford, who had died at the age of two; and Mary of York who had died at the age of 14. Both had predeceased the King. However, the remains of these two children were later found elsewhere in the chapel, leaving the occupants of the children's coffins within the tomb unknown.

=== Perkin Warbeck ===
In 1491, in Cork, Perkin Warbeck, a young man of Flemish origin was proclaimed by a variety of Yorkist supporters led by the Irish city's former Mayor John Atwater to be Richard. He claimed to have escaped from the Tower and spent the intervening years on the run. Over the next six years, Warbeck travelled across Europe, receiving recognition from a number of monarchs including Maximilian I, Holy Roman Emperor and James IV of Scotland as "Richard IV" of England. This support included Margaret of York, the aunt of the real Richard. Following his capture after a failed invasion of England in 1497, Warbeck was held in the Tower of London. He confessed to being an impostor, and was later executed following an attempt to escape.

== Arms ==
Coat of arms of Richard, Duke of York

As son of the king, Richard was granted use of the arms of the kingdom, differentiated by a label argent, on the first point a canton gules.

== See also ==
- List of people who disappeared

Richard of Shrewsbury, Duke of York and Norfolk House of York Cadet branch of the House of Plantagenet Born: 17 August 1473 Died: 1483?
Political offices
Preceded by The Countess of Norfolk	Earl Marshal with Anne until 1481; Sir Thomas Grey acting as deputy 1478–1483	Succeeded by The Duke of Norfolk
